= List of Twelve Step alternate wordings =

This is a list of Twelve Steps alternate wordings of the Twelve Steps set of guiding principles for recovery from addictive, compulsive, or other behavioral problems that was originally developed by Alcoholics Anonymous. The twelve-step method has been adapted widely by fellowships of people recovering from various addictions, compulsive behaviors, and mental health problems.

In some cases, where other twelve-step groups have adapted the AA steps as guiding principles, they have been altered to emphasize principles important to those particular fellowships or to remove gender-biased or specifically religious language.

Gamblers Anonymous has made significant changes to Steps 2, 3, 4, 5, 6, 7 and 12 by reducing references to God, including a financial inventory, and eliminating "Spiritual Awakening".

Most of the alternate wordings are in Step 1 and Step 12:

Program	Step 1	Step 12	Reference
Alcoholics Anonymous	We admitted we were powerless over alcohol—that our lives had become unmanageable.	Having had a spiritual awakening as the result of these steps, we tried to carry this message to alcoholics, and to practice these principles in all our affairs.	
Al-Anon/Alateen	alcohol	others	
Adult Children of Alcoholics	the effects of alcoholism or other family dysfunction	others who still suffer	
Narcotics Anonymous	our addiction	addicts	
Nar-Anon	the addict	others	
Cocaine Anonymous	cocaine and all other mind-altering substances	addicts	
Co-Dependents Anonymous	others	other codependents	
Co-Dependents Anonymous	Steps 3, 7, 11 - replace Him/His with God for gender neutrality		
Dual Recovery Anonymous	our dual illness of chemical dependency and emotional or psychiatric illness	others who experience dual disorders	
Overeaters Anonymous	food	compulsive overeaters	
Food Addicts in Recovery Anonymous	food	others	
Debtors Anonymous	debt	compulsive debtors	
Crystal Meth Anonymous	crystal meth	crystal meth addicts	
Marijuana Anonymous	marijuana	marijuana addicts	
Pills Anonymous	pills and all other mind-altering substances	addicts	
Sexaholics Anonymous	Lust	Sexaholics	
Sex Addicts Anonymous	addictive sexual behavior	other sex addicts	
Sex Addicts Anonymous	Steps 3, 7, and 11 replace "Him" with "God" and "His" with "God's" for gender neutrality Step 12 replaces "in all our affairs" with "in our lives" due to multiple meanings of "affairs"		
Sex and Love Addicts Anonymous	sex and love addiction	sex and love addicts	
Sex and Love Addicts Anonymous	Steps 3, 7, 11 - replace Him/His with God for gender neutrality Step 12 replaces "in all our affairs" with "in all areas of our lives" due to one meaning of "affairs", i.e., adultery		
Sexual Compulsives Anonymous	sexual compulsion	sexually compulsive people	
Gamblers Anonymous	gambling	Having made an effort to practice these principles in all our affairs, we tried to carry this message to other compulsive gamblers.	
Celebrate Recovery	to control my tendency to do the wrong thing	others	

== See also ==
- Twelve-step program
- List of twelve-step groups
