= Drug addiction recovery groups =

Peer support groups

Drug addiction recovery groups are voluntary associations of people who share a common desire to overcome their drug addiction. Different groups use different methods, ranging from completely secular to explicitly spiritual. Some programs may advocate a reduction in the use of drugs rather than outright abstention. One survey of members found active involvement in any addiction recovery group correlates with higher chances of maintaining sobriety.

Although there is not a difference in whether group or individual therapy is better for the patient, studies show that any therapy increases positive outcomes for patients with substance use disorders. The survey found group participation increased when the individual members' beliefs matched those of their primary support group (many addicts are members of multiple addiction recovery groups). Analysis of the survey results found a significant positive correlation between the religiosity of members and their participation in twelve-step programs (these programs describe themselves as spiritual rather than religious) and to a lesser level in non-religious SMART Recovery groups, the correlation factor being three times smaller for SMART Recovery than for twelve-step addiction recovery groups. Religiosity was inversely related to participation in Secular Organizations for Sobriety.

A survey of a cross-sectional sample of clinicians working in outpatient facilities (selected from the SAMHSA On-line Treatment Facility Locator) found that clinicians referring clients to only twelve-step groups were more likely than those referring their clients to twelve-step groups and "twelve-step alternatives" to believe less strongly in the effectiveness of cognitive behavioral and psychodynamic-oriented therapy, and were likely to be unfamiliar with twelve-step alternatives. A logistic regression of clinicians' knowledge and awareness of cognitive behavioral therapy effectiveness and preference for the twelve-step model was correlated with referring exclusively to twelve-step groups.

== Twelve-step recovery groups ==
Twelve-step programs are mutual aid organizations for the purpose of recovery from substance addictions, behavioral addictions, and compulsions. Developed in the 1930s by alcoholics, the first twelve-step program, Alcoholics Anonymous (AA), aided its membership to overcome alcoholism. Since that time, dozens of other organizations have been derived from AA's approach to address problems as varied as drug addiction, compulsive gambling, sex and overeating. All twelve-step programs utilize a version of AA's suggested twelve steps first published in the 1939 book Alcoholics Anonymous: The Story of How More Than One Hundred Men Have Recovered from Alcoholism.

As summarized by the American Psychological Association (APA), the process involves the following:

- admitting that one cannot control one's alcoholism, addiction, or compulsion;
- coming to believe in a Higher Power that can give strength;
- examining past errors with the help of a sponsor (experienced member);
- making amends for these errors;
- learning to live a new life with a new code of behavior;
- helping others who suffer from the same alcoholism, addictions, or compulsions.

Participants attend meetings and are able to make new connections with other members who are striving towards a similar goal. If a person is unable to attend a meeting face-to-face, many of the groups have meetings by phone or online as another option. Each group has its own textbook, workbooks or both, which provide information about their program of recovery and suggestions on how to "work the steps". Often, free literature is available for anyone who asks for it at a meeting. This provides potential new members or family members with relevant information about both the addiction and that specific group's version of the twelve-step process of recovery. New members are invited to work with another member who has already been through the twelve-steps at least once. That person serves as a guide to the new member, answers questions and provides feedback as the new member goes through the steps. These groups are spiritually based and encourage a belief in a power greater than the members. Most do not have one specific conception of what that means and allow the member to decide what spirituality means to them as it applies to their recovery. The groups emphasize living on a spiritual yet not necessarily religious basis. Groups typically advocate for complete abstinence, usually from all drugs including alcohol. This is because of the perceived potential for cross-addiction, the idea that there is a tendency to trade one addiction for another. Despite the idea of cross-addiction being accepted as real in many addiction recovery groups, there is said to be little empirical evidence to support the idea and recent research suggests that the opposite is more likely to be true. The following is a list of twelve-step drug addiction recovery groups. Twelve-step programs for problems other than drug addiction also exist.

- Alcoholics Anonymous (AA) – This group gave birth to the twelve-step program of recovery. Meetings are focused on alcoholism only and advocate complete abstinence. Meetings are held all over the world.
- Cocaine Anonymous (CA) – This group is focused on cessation of cocaine and all other mind-altering substances. The program advocates complete abstinence from all mind-altering substances in order to recover from the disease of addiction. Meetings are held all over the world.
- Crystal Meth Anonymous (CMA) – This group focuses on abstinence from crystal meth although it does recognize the potential for cross-addiction, the tendency for an addict to substitute one addiction for another. Meetings are currently available in eight countries.
- Heroin Anonymous (HA) – This group is focused on abstinence from heroin along with all other drugs including alcohol. Meetings are held in England and the United States.
- Marijuana Anonymous (MA) – This group focuses of recovery from marijuana addiction. Groups meet in eleven countries.
- Narcotics Anonymous (NA) – This group has meetings in 143 countries and focuses on recovery from the use of all drugs and alcohol. The group makes no distinction between any mood or mind-altering substance and encourages members to look for similarities the common problem they all share, rather than focusing on the differences.
- Nicotine Anonymous (NicA) – This group is for those desiring to stop the use of nicotine in all forms. Groups are available in many countries.
- Pills Anonymous (PA) – This group is focused on addiction to pills and all other mind-altering substances. Groups are available in seven countries.

== Non-twelve-step recovery groups ==
These groups do not follow the twelve-step recovery method, although their members may also attend twelve-step meetings. It is common for individuals to try many different meetings and groups while in recovery. What works for one may not work for another, so trying different types of meetings can be helpful to someone seeking recovery from drugs and alcohol.

- Association of Recovering Motorcyclists (ARM) – This association of recovering motorcyclists is a brotherhood of men recovering from alcohol and/or drug addiction. They support one another in remaining abstinent from drugs and alcohol while continuing to ride motorcycles together regularly.
- Celebrate Recovery (CR) – Celebrate recovery is a recovery program for any life problem, including addiction to alcohol and other drugs. In contrast to most twelve-step programs, the group recognizes Jesus Christ as their higher power. Their groups are located in the United States.
- LifeRing Secular Recovery (LSR)
- Moderation Management (MM)
- Pagans in Recovery (PIR) – Pagans in recovery have adapted the twelve-step program of recovery into language that is not overtly Christian as it was originally written so that those with other belief systems can more comfortably work the program. They have their own literature.
- Rational Recovery (RR)
- Recovery Dharma (RD)
- Refuge Recovery (RR)
- Secular Organizations for Sobriety (SOS)
- SMART Recovery
- Women for Sobriety (WFS)

== See also ==
- List of twelve-step groups
- Self-help groups for mental health
- Sober living houses
