= Women for Sobriety =

Women's addiction recovery group

Women for Sobriety (WFS) is a non-profit secular addiction recovery group for women with addiction problems. WFS was created by sociologist Jean Kirkpatrick in 1976 as an alternative to twelve-step addiction recovery groups like Alcoholics Anonymous (AA). As of 1998, there were more than 200 WFS groups worldwide. Only women are allowed to attend the organization's meetings as the groups focus specifically on women's issues. WFS is not a radical feminist, anti-male, or anti-AA organization.

== History ==
Jean Kirkpatrick attended AA meetings for three years and was unable to maintain sobriety. The methods of what is now the "New Life" program of Women for Sobriety empowered Kirkpatrick to quit drinking. Discovered through trial and error, the New Life methods are based largely on the writings of Ralph Waldo Emerson (particularly his essay, "Self-Reliance") and the Unity Movement of New Thought in addition to Kirkpatrick's personal experience, knowledge of sociology, and experience in AA. In her design, as in AA, WFS encourages the open and hosting sharing but focuses on improving self-esteem and reducing guilt rather than admitting powerlessness. While Kirkpatrick's program stresses spirituality as the "fundamental object of life" the solution to alcoholism is described as being within the mind of the female alcoholic, not requiring a Higher Power. Also like AA, Kirkpatrick's program encourages complete abstinence from alcohol, rather than harm reduction.

== Program ==
The program is built on 13 Acceptance Statements encouraging members to change their self-image and world view. As is practiced in SMART Recovery, WFS members avoid labeling themselves as alcoholics and addicts and instead refer to themselves as competent women during meeting introductions. Philosophically, these ideas are close to modernity, emphasizing self-control and rationality. As described in WFS literature, the fundamental problem of females with alcohol dependence is low self-esteem, a condition that is culturally reinforced in women more than in men, necessitating a qualitatively different treatment for women. In WFS members focus on responsibility rather than powerlessness, on self-esteem rather than humility and on thinking rather than surrender. Like AA, WFS encourages meditation and spirituality, although sobriety is not viewed as dependent on a Higher Power. To increase self-esteem, WFS encourages positive thinking and discourages negative thinking (a cause of low self-esteem).

In WFS language, "faulty thinking" causes destructive behavior, consequently WFS teaches its members that they have the power to change their thinking to change their actions. The WFS approach, in this sense, is similar to cognitive behavioral therapy. Newcomers are encouraged to take pride in their accomplishments, no matter how small—even in an hour of sobriety. Similarly, members learn to beware of negative thoughts as they arise. There are also elements of applied self-in-relation theory (the theory that a woman's sense of definition and value is strongly tied to their relationships with others); women are encouraged to build new, healthy relationships inside and outside of meetings.

=== The Acceptance Statements ===
The 13 Acceptance Statements represent six levels of growth in which members accept the physical nature of alcoholism (Statement 1), remove negativity (Statements 2, 4 and 9), learn to think better of themselves (Statements 5 and 12), change their attitudes (Statements 3, 6, and 11), improve their relationships (Statements 7 and 10), and change their life's priorities (Statements 8 and 13).

1. I have a life-threatening problem that once had me.
2. Negative thoughts destroy only myself.
3. Happiness is a habit I am developing.
4. Problems bother me only to the degree I permit.
5. I am what I think.
6. Life can be ordinary or it can be great.
7. Love can change the course of my world.
8. The fundamental object of life is emotional and spiritual growth.
9. The past is gone forever.
10. All love given returns.
11. Enthusiasm is my daily exercise.
12. I am a competent woman, and I have much to give life.
13. I am responsible for myself and for my actions.

The First, Second, Tenth, Twelfth, and Thirteenth Statements were changed at some point in the 1990s these originally appeared, respectively, as "I have a drinking problem that once had me, Negative emotions destroy only myself, All love given returns twofold, I am a competent woman and have much to give to others, I am responsible for myself and my sisters." The Third, Fourth and Twelfth Statements were revised in 2017 per the WFS Board of Directors. They originally appeared (after the 1990s edit), respectively, as "Happiness is a habit I will develop, Problems bother me only to the degree I permit them to, I am a competent woman and have much to give life."

=== Meetings ===
Meetings range in size from two to twenty members, the ideal group size is between six and ten women. The room is arranged so that all the women are sitting in a circle. The meeting opens with a reading of the thirteen statements and the WFS purpose. The opening is followed by discussion among members based on a topic from WFS literature (e.g. acceptance, stress, compulsions, procrastination or one of the thirteen statements). Following a five- to ten-minute break, members begin the second part of the meeting. During the second part, members discuss what happened the previous week, each member is given a chance to speak and is encouraged to include at least one positive behavior or event. Discussing previous drinking experiences, "drunkalogs", is discouraged as members are asked to keep their sharing positive. Cross-talk, responding directly to the speaker, is allowed. At the meeting closing members hold hands and recite the WFS motto, "We are capable and competent, caring and compassionate, always willing to help another, bonded together in overcoming our addictions."

A telephone list is distributed and members are allowed to call each other throughout the week. If someone has been hospitalized or has returned to drinking, other members will call her to offer their support.

=== Certified Facilitators ===
Meetings are run by Certified Facilitators with at least one year of continuous sobriety who are familiar with the WFS program. Facilitators must be certified by WFS headquarters in Quakertown, Pennsylvania.

== Demographics ==
During the winter of 1991, Lee Ann Kaskutas conducted a survey of all WFS members, she sent surveys to each active WFS group at the time and achieved 73% response rate. The information in this section is based on her analysis of the survey results.

The average WFS member is 46 years old, white, has been sober for 4.5 years, and is married with 1.8 children. About one-third of WFS members are Protestant, another third are Catholic, and about one-fifth do not have a religious affiliation. Two-thirds have attended college and more than half are employed with an average individual income of $23,700 per year (an average household income of $51,800 per year). Half of WFS members have been sober for less than two years and in WFS for a year or less. Women who took disulfiram were more likely to relapse than those who did not. Most members (40%) were self-referred, others were referred to WFS by a counselor or treatment program. The vast majority of WFS members had received professional help at some point (89%), most frequently this was individual therapy and least frequently group therapy.

=== Correlates of self-esteem ===
Length of sobriety was correlated positively with membership in WFS. Half, however, of WFS members had been sober before joining WFS. Controlling for the length of sobriety, the length of time in WFS was positively correlated with self-esteem, as measured by the Rosenberg self-esteem scale. Three other independent variables were correlated with self-esteem: belief in the First Statement, frequent use of the statements, and disbelief in AA's First Step.

=== Turning points ===
A turning point represents an event or state that made WFS members realize they needed to do something about their drinking. The survey of WFS members found there were eight general categories of turning points: physical signs of alcoholism, emotional problems, general life problems, loss of control over drinking, being confronted about their drinking, problems related to driving, exposure to others' drinking problems and problems related to work. On average, the turning point occurred for WFS members at age 39, it took WFS members four years to achieve sobriety after their turning point and five years to become a member in WFS. Women who had a turning point entailing a realization that their life was out of control achieved sobriety in less than average time (two years). Similarly, women who had felt suicidal or attempted suicide achieved sobriety in one year. The five factors most frequently cited for attending WFS were: self-motivation, seeing information about WFS in a newspaper, WFS literature, hearing information from friends, and getting information from a counseling agency.

=== Dual membership ===
Nearly all, ninety percent, of WFS members have experience with AA and about one-third also regularly attend AA meetings (and have for an average of five years). Non-AA attending WFS members are more likely to believe that maintaining sobriety is a matter of hard work having little to do with God's intervention, while those attending AA attribute their sobriety to their spiritual program. Ninety-two percent of WFS members, however, believe their state of mind is the most important factor in maintaining sobriety.

Although length of time in WFS correlated positively with self-esteem, length of time in AA did not emerge as a significant predictor of self-esteem. Relapse was less common among women who attended both AA and WFS. The largest proportion of WFS members to achieve sobriety in a year following their turning point were those who attended AA in addition to seeking professional help compared to those who just attended AA or sought professional help. WFS members who attended AA reported they did so primarily as insurance against relapse (28%), its availability (25%), for sharing (31%), and support (27%). WFS members who did not attend AA mentioned feeling as though they never fit in at AA (20%), found AA too negative (18%), disliked drunkalogs (14%) disliked AA's focus on the past (14%) and felt that AA was geared more to men's needs (15%).

=== Attrition and prevalence ===
WFS and AA have similar drop-out rates of new members; in about four months about half of new WFS members drop out. WFS discourages lifetime membership and reliance on meetings to maintain sobriety. In this way, the size and number of WFS meetings remain static but does not necessarily reflect a decline in the group's popularity. Forming a WFS meeting for some may be prohibitively difficult, in addition to obtaining certification and a year of sobriety, the leader has ongoing responsibility for the meeting.

== Effectiveness ==
A 2018 longitudinal study compared the self-reported success of Women for Sobriety, LifeRing Secular Recovery, SMART Recovery, and Alcoholics Anonymous. After normalizing for income and other demographic factors, the study saw that Women for Sobriety was about as effective as Alcoholics Anonymous.

== Criticism ==
The thirteen statements may be difficult for women to implement in day-to-day living, depending on their situations. For instance, women with limited financial resources may find it difficult to accept that "problems bother her only to the extent she allows them." Depressed women may find it difficult to make enthusiasm a daily exercise, or accept happiness as a habit to develop. Similarly, positive thinking statements have been interpreted as asking women to deny their real feelings and inhibiting recovery. The applicability of the statements to female alcoholic's lives may limit the appeal of the WFS program.

Kirkpatrick has stated the statements were derived from observing her thoughts as she felt good enough to stop drinking. The intention of the statements is behavior modification, asking WFS members not to dwell on past problems is intended to prevent them from drinking. The purpose is not to deny the past, but not to indulge it as this is likely to cause negative thinking. By practicing statements and positive thinking, it is believed WFS members slowly change their habits and their thoughts become reality.

== Literature ==
WFS sells several dozen books on their website, and several dozen more booklets, CDs, and related materials and regularly publish a journal Sobering Thoughts. Four books by Kirkpatrick, however, are used principally in the WFS program, the most important of which is Turnabout.

- Kirkpatrick, Jean (1999). Turnabout: New Help for the Woman Alcoholic. New York: Barricade Books. ISBN 978-1-56980-146-8. OCLC 42904483.
- Kirkpatrick, Jean (1986). Goodbye Hangovers, Hello Life. New York: Atheneum. ISBN 978-0-689-11576-9. OCLC 12550360.
- Kirkpatrick, Jean (1990). On the Road to Sell Recovery. Quakertown, PA: Women for Sobriety. OCLC 30498159.
- Kirkpatrick, Jean (1981). A Fresh Start. Dubuque, Iowa: Kendall/Hunt Publish Company. ISBN 978-0-8403-2463-4. OCLC 8708189.

== See also ==
- Addiction recovery groups
- Alcoholism
- Cognitive Behavior Therapy
- Drug addiction
- LifeRing Secular Recovery
- Rational Recovery
- Secular Organizations for Sobriety
- SMART Recovery
