= Families Anonymous =

Twelve-step program

Families Anonymous (FA) is a twelve-step program for relatives and friends of addicts. FA was founded in 1971 by a group of parents in Southern California concerned with their children's substance abuse.

== Goal ==
The focus of FA is on supporting members rather than changing the behavior of their friend or relative with a substance abuse problem. Tough love is suggested as an approach to use when dealing with addicts—members do not need to rescue addicts from the consequences of problems the addicts have created, and members should be willing to offend addicts if necessary.

One study suggested the therapeutic effects of participation included a process of internalization from the stories and information shared, rationalization and freeing from guilt regarding the behavior of the abuser, and The Traditions protecting anonymity which allow members to reduce potential stigma acquired from membership.

== Activities ==
As of 2007 there are FA arrange meetings in more than 20 countries and about 225 regular meetings in the United States. A survey of FA groups in Lisbon, Portugal found members were mostly female, 45–60 years old, and mothers of substance abusing children.

FA's original literature includes the book Today a Better Way on the principles of the FA program, a newsletter, the Twelve Step Rag, as well as several pamphlets and booklets.

== See also ==
- Al-Anon/Alateen
- Co-Dependents Anonymous
- List of twelve-step groups
