= Workaholics Anonymous =

Twelve-step program

Workaholics Anonymous (WA) is a twelve-step program founded circa 1983 for people identifying themselves as "powerless over compulsive work, worry, or activity" including, but not limited to, workaholics–including overworkers and those who suffer from unmanageable procrastination or work aversion. Anybody with a desire to stop working compulsively is welcome at a WA meeting. Unmanageability can include compulsive work in housework, hobbies, fitness, or volunteering as well as in paid work. Anyone with a problematic relationship with work is welcomed. Workaholics Anonymous is considered an effective program for those who need its help.

In 1983, one of the first formal efforts to create a fellowship around work addiction recovery began in New York when a corporate financial planner and a school teacher met. They formed Workaholics Anonymous to stop working compulsively themselves and to help others who suffered from the disease of workaholism. In their first meetings, spouses joined them and in retrospect were the first Work-Anon group, seeking recovery for family and friends of workaholics.

Workaholics Anonymous is an international fellowship of over fifty in-person, phone, and online meetings with over an estimated thousand active members. WA's World Service Office has a Menlo Park central address. WA has developed its own literature, most notably the Workaholics Anonymous Book of Recovery, but also uses the Alcoholics Anonymous (AA) books Alcoholics Anonymous and Twelve Steps and Twelve Traditions.

== Definitions ==
WA defines workaholism by signposts and characteristics, as both a substance addiction (to adrenaline and other stress hormones) and as a process addiction (to compulsively doing or avoiding work). WA further defines compulsive working as a progressive, addictive illness. Much like AA's position on alcoholism, WA believes compulsive working is chronic and done in an effort to alleviate psychological stress.

Some Workaholics Anonymous members have identified cyclical patterns where they spend time procrastinating necessary work, engaging in self-criticism, while creating so much of a delay that it necessitates frantic working at an unsustainable pace to meet a deadline. Once the work is completed, perhaps by the deadline or even shortly afterwards, the person becomes exhausted and burnt out, finding themselves having an even harder time beginning the work for the next deadline. This results in more frantic working as the next deadline approaches. In an analogy to terminology from Overeaters Anonymous, WA members describe this as "Work Bulimia", and the stage of burnout and procrastination as "Work Anorexia".

To help potential members decide whether or not they need the program, WA provides a questionnaire, asking things like "Do you get more excited about work than about family or anything else?" Answering "yes" to three or more of these questions is considered a good indication of problems with which WA may be able to assist.

== Recovery tools and strategies ==
The WA program is based on the Twelve Steps and Twelve Traditions of Alcoholics Anonymous. Small changes have been made to make these applicable to compulsive working, but such adaptation has been minimal. To take the Twelve Steps and practice the Twelve Traditions, WA program literature recommends using fifteen "Tools of Recovery". These include Listening, Prioritizing, Substituting, Underscheduling, Playing, Concentrating, Pacing, Relaxing, Accepting, Asking, Meetings, Telephoning, Balancing, Serving, and Living in the Now. These tools are considered critical to obtaining and maintaining abstinence. WA literature also refers to the "Principles of Recovery" which include Abstinence, Sponsorship, Writing, Action Plan, Humor, Time Out, Nurturing, Literature, Anonymity, The Twelve Steps, and Meditation.

Meetings offer a consensual validation and serve to diminish feelings of guilt and shame. A sponsor provides guidance through the WA program and support.

=== Abstinence plans ===
In Workaholics Anonymous, abstinence "means to abstain from compulsive working, activity, worry, and work avoidance". Members work with their sponsor or home meeting to develop an Abstinence Plan. Bottom lines define the point where workaholics cross from abstinence to work addiction. The tool of abstinence includes working with a sponsor to establish and maintain personal bottom lines, top lines, and guidelines for recovery as well as seeking support around bottom line behavior. Some authors suggest that initial recovery and abstinence can involve stopping, leaving, or limiting work as well as identifying bottom line and trigger behaviors.

=== Meetings ===
In Workaholics Anonymous, meetings are a keystone of connection. In recent years, meetings have diversified in form, not only including in-person meetings but also now including online, email, and phone meeting for those suffering from the disease who are located in diverse areas. There are meetings in France, Australia, England, Brazil, New Zealand, and twenty-three states in the United States. Workaholics Anonymous via their website also offers networking and connection for member and hosts an annual conference for those who suffer. There is a sister workaholism recovery fellowship in Germany, Austria, and Switzerland called Anonyme Arbeitssüchtige (AAS) with thirty-four meetings and an annual conference.

== Literature ==
WA publishes the book The Workaholics Anonymous Book of Recovery, an upcoming Step Study Guide Book, and several pamphlets, and the quarterly periodical called "Living in Balance". The following list is not comprehensive:

- Workaholics Anonymous World Service Organization (2005). The Workaholics Anonymous Book of Recovery. Menlo Park, California: Workaholics Anonymous World Service Organization. ISBN 0-9771943-0-2. OCLC 153767048. Archived from the original on 2008-05-01.
- Workaholics Anonymous World Service (1996). A Brief Guide to Recovery in Work Addiction. Menlo Park, California: W.A. World Service Organization.
- Workaholics Anonymous World Service (2004). Abstinence: Top Lines and Bottom Lines in W.A. Menlo Park, California: W.A. World Service Organization.
- Workaholics Anonymous World Service (1996). Turning Work Into Play in W.A. Menlo Park, California: W.A. World Service Organization.
- Workaholics Anonymous World Service (1996). Recovery in Workaholics Anonymous: Working the Steps. Menlo Park, California: W.A. World Service Organization.
- Workaholics Anonymous World Service (1990–2008). Living in Balance: Quarterly Newsletter of Workaholics Anonymous. Menlo Park, California: W.A. World Service Organization.

== See also ==
- List of twelve-step groups
