= Pills Anonymous =

Drug addiction recovery plan

Pills Anonymous logo

Pills Anonymous (PA) is a twelve-step program founded in 1972 for people who seek recovery from prescription drug addiction. PA is patterned very closely after Alcoholics Anonymous, although the two groups are not affiliated.

PA uses the book There Is A Solution: The Twelve Steps and Twelve Traditions of Pills Anonymous (ISBN 978-0989325905), created as a combined text and study guide for pill addicts to use in their recovery, and to further their understanding of the Twelve Steps and Twelve Traditions and apply them in their daily lives. The PA book was published in August 2013.

As of 2013, there are several thousand PA members in the United States, Canada and other countries attending over 60 meetings per week. On-line meetings exist as well.

== The program ==
The only requirement for membership is "a desire to stop using pills", and members "meet regularly to help each other stay clean", where "clean" is defined as complete abstinence from all mood- and mind-altering substances (including alcohol). Membership in P.A. is free, and there are no dues or fees. The foundation of the Pills Anonymous program is the twelve steps and twelve traditions.

Pills Anonymous "has no opinion on outside issues", including those of politics, science, or medicine, and does not endorse any outside organization or institution. The fellowship does not promote itself, but rather attracts new members through public information and outreach. P.A. groups and P.A. World Service supply outside organizations with factual information regarding the P.A. program, and individual members may carry the P.A. message to hospitals and institutions, such as treatment centers.

P.A. provides a program of recovery which can not only bring freedom from pill addiction. It can lead to a new way of life which is healthier, happier, more productive, and more satisfying than the life the pill addict had previously been living.

=== The nature of addiction ===
P.A. describes addiction as a progressive disease with no known cure, which affects every area of a pill addict's life: physical, mental, emotional, and spiritual. P.A. suggests that the disease of addiction can be arrested, and recovery is possible through working the P.A. twelve-step program. The steps never mention drugs or drug use; rather, they refer to addiction to pills and all other mind-altering substances, to indicate that pill addicts have a disease of which pill use is one symptom. Other symptoms include obsession, compulsion, denial, and self-centered fear.

Many pill addicts first come to P.A. after reaching a "bottom" in their life, a point at which life feels completely unmanageable, sometimes characterized by "unemployability, dereliction and destruction" and centered around the getting and using and finding ways and means to get more pills. Every P.A. member reaches a different bottom, which can be wherever the pill addict chooses to stop using. In practice, it is pill use and the extreme consequences associated with its abuse that bring most pill addicts to their bottom, many of them sliding along 'this bottom' for many years and often never finding a way out.

== Meetings ==
Regular meetings, hosted by P.A. groups, are the basic unit of the P.A. Fellowship. Meetings are held in a variety of places such as church or synagogue meeting rooms, libraries, hospitals, community centers, parks, or any other place that can accommodate a meeting.

Members who attend the same meeting on a regular basis to establish a recovery network and reliable routine understand this to be their "Home Group". Group members are able to participate in the group's business, and play an important role in deciding how the group's meetings should be conducted.

=== Formats ===
There are two basic types of meetings, "open" and "closed". Anyone is welcome to attend an open meeting, while closed meetings are limited to pill addicts and to people who think they may have a problem with drugs.

Meeting formats vary, but often include time devoted to the reading aloud of P.A. literature regarding the issues involved in living life clean and sober which is written by and for members of P.A. Many meetings also include an "open sharing" component, where anyone attending has the opportunity to share. There is usually no direct feedback during the 'share', thus only one person ever speaks at any given time during this portion of the meeting. Some groups choose to host a single speaker (such meetings are usually denoted "speaker meetings") to share for the majority of the meeting time.

Other meeting formats include round-robin (in which sharing goes around in a circle or each speaker picks the next person to share). Some meetings focus on reading, writing, and/or sharing about one of the Twelve Steps or some other portion of P.A. literature. Some meetings are "common needs" (a.k.a. special interest) meetings, supporting a particular group of people based on gender, sexual identity, age, language or other characteristic. These meetings are not exclusionary, as anyone with a desire to stop using pills is welcome at any P.A. meeting. PA Communities will often make an effort to have an open meeting run at the same time for members who don't identify with the common needs meeting.

During the meeting, some groups allot time for P.A.-related announcements, and many meetings set aside time to recognize "anniversaries" or "birthdays" of clean time. Individuals are sometimes given an opportunity to announce their clean and sober time to the group. In some meetings, and for certain anniversaries, medallions, which denote various amounts of clean time, are distributed to those who have achieved those milestones. In some areas, the pill addict who is celebrating an "anniversary" will be able to conduct the readings for the meeting, and s/he will be the speaker to carry the P.A. message. Then s/he will have his or her sponsor, a friend, or a family member present a medallion, at which time the presenter will share some of the celebrating pill addict's achievements from the last year, or from during the entire course of his or her recovery. Then the pill addict celebrating his or her anniversary can share his or her experience, strength, and hope with the group on how they achieved their recovery.

"Each group has but one primary purpose—to carry the message to the addict who still suffers" (Pills Anonymous' Fifth Tradition). Therefore, the newcomer is considered to be the most important person in any meeting. The message of Pills Anonymous is hope: that there is another way to live and we can recover one day at a time from our addiction.

== Service ==
P.A. literature suggests that service work is an essential part of a program of recovery. Service is "doing the next right thing" and is the best example of "good will", which is the basis for the freedom promised by the P.A. program. Service work usually consists of chairing a meeting, but may be as simple as cleaning up after the meeting, putting away chairs, or answering a phone. Additionally, there are basic, formalized service positions at the group level to help the group perform its function—for example, treasurer, secretary, and World Service Delegate (who represents the group in the larger service structure).

== Spirituality ==
Pills Anonymous calls itself a spiritual program of recovery from the disease of pill addiction, but does not require membership in any religion. The P.A. program places importance on developing a working relationship with a "higher power". The literature suggests that members formulate their own personal understanding of a higher power. The only suggested guidelines are that this power be "loving, caring, and greater than one's self." Members are given freedom in coming to an understanding of a higher power that works for them. Individuals from various spiritual and religious backgrounds, as well as many atheists and agnostics, have developed a relationship with their own higher power. P.A. also makes frequent use of the word "God"; some members who have difficulty with this term substitute "higher power" or read it as an acronym for "Good Orderly Direction."

The twelve steps of the P.A. program are based upon spiritual principles, three of which are honesty, open-mindedness, and willingness, embodied in the first three steps. According to PA members, these principles, when followed to the best of one's ability, allow for a new way of life.

P.A. meetings often close with the Third Step Prayer ("Take my will and my life. Guide me in my recovery. Show me how to live.") or the Serenity Prayer.

== Sponsorship ==
One pill addict helping another is an essential part of the P.A. program. It is therefore highly recommended that members of Pills Anonymous find a sponsor. A sponsor is a P.A. member who helps another member by sharing his or her experience, strength, and hope in recovery, and who serves as guide through the Twelve Steps. P.A. members often choose a sponsor with experience in applying the Twelve Steps of Pills Anonymous. For stronger identification, many P.A. members have sponsors of the same sex, although members are free to choose any other member as a sponsor. It is also suggested that one should find a sponsor who has not only worked the 12 steps of Pills Anonymous, but who also has an understanding of the 12 traditions of Pills Anonymous. Sponsors also maintain the continuity of the fundamental message that Pills Anonymous works, has worked for others for many years, and continues to work.

== Anonymity ==
The Twelfth Tradition of Pills Anonymous states that "anonymity is the spiritual foundation of all our traditions, ever reminding us to place principles before personalities."

Many P.A. members identify themselves in meetings by their first name only. The spirit of anonymity is about placing "principles before personalities"; affirming that no individual pill addict is superior to another; and recognizing that individual pill addicts do not recover without the fellowship or its spiritual principles.

The Eleventh Tradition states that P.A. members "need always maintain personal anonymity at the level of press, radio, and films."

== History ==
PA's beginnings are not fully known. The longest-running known group, which is located in New York City, dates back to 1972. Dr. Paul O., a well known AA speaker, has also talked about starting a meeting in the 1970s. There are several references to Pills Anonymous in books such as The Recovery Book and Young, sober & free: experience, strength, and hope for young adults.

On October 1, 2008, Pills Anonymous World Service was incorporated as a 501(c)(3) charitable organization in the state of Arizona, as a result of two conferences held earlier that year. One of the conferences was held in Las Vegas, Nevada in March, the other in Tempe, Arizona in September. During the Tempe Conference, the Delegates voted to Incorporate Pills Anonymous World Service. They also voted to accept, as the organization's guide moving forward, the Pills Anonymous World Service Manual, which contains the Twelve Steps of Pills Anonymous; the Twelve Traditions of Pills Anonymous; and many suggestions as how the group should be run.

In June 2009, in Ontario, California, the Pills Anonymous Local Service Manual was introduced and voted to be conference-approved. The Manual is intended as a guide to help individual Groups form meetings, an important part of the PA program.

In October 2010, in Mesa, Arizona, the Pills Anonymous World Service Public Information Guide was introduced. The 2010 Conference quickly approved this guide, which provides guidance to P.A. groups and the World Service in attracting newcomers to the program. The 2010 conference also approved the use of "press releases" to send the message of recovery to the media.

In October 2011, in Mesa, Arizona, the conference approved the formation of the Pills Anonymous World Service Office Board of Directors to incorporate the WSO and shepherd production of the PA Book and key tags.

In July 2012, the official PA logo received its trademark registration number.

In August 2013, the PA Book, There is a Solution: The Twelve Steps and Twelve Traditions of Pills Anonymous, was published.

== See also ==
- Addiction recovery groups
- Drug addiction
- List of deaths from drug overdose and intoxication
- List of twelve-step groups
- Twelve-step program
