= Clutterers Anonymous =

Hoarding twelve-step program help group

Clutterers Anonymous (CLA) is a twelve-step program for people who share a common problem with accumulation of clutter. CLA says that it focuses on the underlying issues made manifest by unnecessary physical and emotional clutter, rather than hints, tips and lectures. CLA had active meetings in about 70 cities in 24 states in the US, and several in England, Germany, and Iceland, as of 2011. CLA Tradition 3 states, "The only requirement for CLA membership is a desire to stop cluttering." Clutterers Anonymous replaces "powerless over alcohol" in the First Step of the Twelve Steps originally developed by Alcoholics Anonymous (AA) with "powerless over our clutter." CLA was founded in May 1989 in Simi Valley, California. CLA notes that there are countless reasons a person may become a clutterer or hoarder, however this program does not concern itself with the "why". Instead CLA focuses on helping those still suffering, with a path to "sobriety", in this case de-cluttering in order to restore serenity, clarity, and the ability to live a fulfilling life.

== CLA-approved literature ==
The CLA-approved literature includes the two fundamental texts of Alcoholics Anonymous (AA), Alcoholics Anonymous (the so-called "Big Book") and the Twelve Steps and Twelve Traditions eight CLA-specific leaflets, and a 28-page booklet, "Is CLA for You? A Newcomer's Guide to Recovery. At some meetings, CLA members read directly from both books and may replace the word "alcoholic" with "clutterer."

Clutterers Anonymous is not associated with Messies Anonymous, a support group founded by Sandra Felton, which uses her copyrighted publications.

== See also ==
- List of twelve-step groups
- Self-help groups for mental health
