= Underearners Anonymous =

Program and organization for underachieving

- Founded: 2005
- Region served: Face-to-face meetings: Canada, Colombia, Denmark, Iran, Israel, United Kingdom, United States. Phone meetings: world wide
- Website: https://www.underearnersanonymous.org/

Underearners Anonymous (UA) is a twelve-step program founded in 2005 for men and women who have come together to overcome what they call "underearning". Underearning is not just the inability to provide for oneself monetarily including the inability to provide for one's needs presently and in the future but also the general inability to express one's capabilities and competencies. The underlying premise of Underearners Anonymous is that underearning is a kind of mental disorder regarding the use of time, rather like the alcoholic's self-destructive compulsion to drink to excess.

Indeed, members of UA sometimes refer to themselves as "time drunks", because they have a propensity to fritter away their time in questionable activities, rather than pursuing constructive goals. This parallel with alcoholism has led the fellowship to appropriate much of the apparatus of Alcoholics Anonymous (AA), including the Twelve Steps, regular meetings to share their "experience, strength, and hope", and sponsorship. UA suggests studying AA literature to gain a better understanding of addictive diseases. Specifically, UA endorses the use of the Twelve Steps and Twelve Traditions and Alcoholics Anonymous (also known as the "Big Book").

UA uses additional tools, such as keeping written records of how one spends one's time, "possession consciousness" (the disposal of "what no longer serves us"), goal pages which is the writing down of one's goals, measuring progress and rewarding achievement and the avoidance of "debting" (unsecured borrowing). They also advocate "action meetings" in which members peer-counsel others about earning-related issues, and "action partnerships" in which members encourage each other to complete earning-related tasks.

== Success ==
The Effectiveness of Alcoholics Anonymous article of this encyclopedia notes the difficulty in rigorously testing the effectiveness of AA. Given the more subjective nature of underearning, as opposed to alcoholism, the effectiveness of UA is probably even harder to rigorously investigate. Some compelling anecdotal evidence of success, at least in certain instances, has been reported.

== Relation to Debtors Anonymous (DA) ==
In the early days of DA, author Jerrold Mundis heard about the concept of underearning from his friend, the life coach Jim R. In 1995, Mundis published a book, "Earn What You Deserve: How to Stop Underearning & Start Thriving."

Underearners Anonymous was started when a group of individuals attending a DA meeting, realized the power of the 12 steps to release people from the bondage of deprivation. This group envisioned an independent program for what ailed them not addressed by DA. The first official Underearners Anonymous meeting was then held on October 3, 2005.

Underearners Anonymous continues to adhere to the DA philosophy; hence the emphasis on avoiding unsecured borrowing. However, UA also believes that a healthy relationship with money requires more than just recovery from "incurring unsecured debt," the primary focus of Debtors Anonymous. Underearning also overlaps with deprivation, social anorexia, and underachieving, collectively referred to as "under-being," giving it an emphasis different from the Debtors Anonymous focus on behaviors such as credit card debt, overspending and compulsive shopping. Many members of Underearners Anonymous are also members of Debtors Anonymous and attend meetings of both organizations.

However, Debtors Anonymous has no affiliation with Underearners Anonymous and neither endorses nor lends the DA name to any outside enterprise. DA, as such, is autonomous and has no opinion on Underearners Anonymous.

== Development ==
UA has grown rapidly and weekly face-to-face meetings take place in the United States, Europe, Iran, Israel and New Zealand with phone meetings available on a daily basis.

== Controversy ==
Beginning in 2021, Underearners Anonymous has been embroiled in a significant governance dispute between the official General Service Board (GSB) and committees that the GSB characterizes as "rogue actors." The controversy began when the World Service Conference Planning Committee independently opened a PayPal account to collect funds for an unsanctioned 2021 World Service Conference, in violation of UA's bylaws requiring GSB authorization for all corporate fund management.

According to a 2022 legal opinion obtained by the GSB, the opposing group lacks authority to use the UA name or trademark for fundraising, as "Underearners Anonymous" is a registered trademark owned by UA GSB, Inc., and their actions constitute violations of New York solicitation laws potentially subject to criminal penalties.

The legal opinion concluded that all actions taken at the unauthorized 2021 conference, including the purported election of new trustees, are "invalid, null and void," and noted that the Corporation's donations had declined by approximately 70% as a result of the dispute, severely impacting its ability to conduct programs and pay bills.

On September 30, 2025 the General Service Board of UA published a letter of intent regarding the potential reunification of UA service bodies.

== See also ==
- Underemployment
- List of twelve-step groups
