= Lifering =

Lifering may refer to:

- Lifebuoy
- LifeRing Secular Recovery
