= Survivors of Incest Anonymous =

Twelve-step program

Survivors of Incest Anonymous (SIA) is a twelve-step fellowship for recovery from the consequences of childhood sexual abuse. SIA was founded in 1982 in Baltimore, Maryland by women who believed their experience in other twelve-step fellowships (Alcoholics Anonymous (AA), Overeaters Anonymous (OA) and Al-Anon) could assist in recovery from sexual trauma. In SIA incest is defined broadly as any sexual behavior imposed on one person by a member of his or her immediate or extended family. The extended family, in this definition, includes but is not limited to: grandparents, uncles, aunts, in-laws, clergy, teachers, cousins, family friends, and stepparents. The abuse may include verbal abuse, emotional abuse and physical behaviors; penetration is not necessary for meeting SIA's definition on incest. Covert incest within the family is also a theme many survivors explore in SIA.

== History ==
In 1987 SIA merged with Sexual Abuse Anonymous headquartered in Long Beach, California. In 1989 SIA merged with Sex Abuse Anonymous, a fellowship headquartered in St. Cloud, Minnesota.

== Meetings ==
In addition to open, mixed gender meetings, SIA designates many meetings as "women only" or "men only." Most SIA groups are not open to those perpetrators of sexual abuse. Meetings that allow perpetrators state this clearly at the beginning of the meeting and will not allow those who are currently perpetrating sexual abuse to attend.

== Criticism ==
=== Postmodern ===
Sociologist Norman Denzin argued that groups such as SIA have a "glossing" effect that causes members to use the same language and framework to describe their experiences thereby having a detrimental homogenizing effect. Sociologist Nancy A. Naples saw the structure of twelve-step fellowships as being antithetical to social change as such groups discourage members from collective political engagement. Author Louise Armstrong saw groups such as SIA as promoting revictimization, explaining that in such groups members are deemed sinful and the fault of their sin and task of redemption are both on their shoulders. Armstrong suggested survivor-generated feminists advocacy organizations challenging the dominant discourse on sexual abuse as a viable alternative.

== See also ==
- List of twelve-step groups
