= Heroin Anonymous =

American based support group

- Type: Mutual-help addiction recovery twelve-step program
- Website: heroinanonymous.org

Heroin Anonymous (HA) is a non-profit group founded in Phoenix, AZ in 2004 to help people addicted to heroin remain substance-free. Modeled after Alcoholics Anonymous, HA is a fellowship of people addicted to heroin who meet regularly to help each other practice complete abstinence from all drugs and alcohol. Heroin Anonymous does not provide drug counseling, medical or psychiatric treatment, or chemical dependency treatment.

HA groups exist in 19 US states and the UK, including a meeting started in Phoenix, Arizona, in 2004. At HA meetings, members talk about their addiction, their difficulties, and their accomplishments. Members maintain anonymity by addressing one another with only first names. Alcoholics Anonymous is used as a guidebook.

Heroin Anonymous is entirely self-supporting but charges no membership fees. They accept contributions from members, and they decline outside donations. They are not allied with any sect, denomination, politics, organization, or institution. HA's stated intention is to avoid controversy and endorsement or opposition to external causes.

The first-ever Heroin Anonymous World Convention was held in Scottsdale, Arizona on August 8-10th in 2014 celebrating its 10th Anniversary. The second Heroin Anonymous World Convention was held in Portland, Oregon from August 31st through September 2nd of 2018. The third Heroin Anonymous World Convention was held in Atlanta, Georgia from August 27-29th of 2021. The fourth Heroin Anonymous World Convention was held in Buffalo, New York on August 16-18th of 2024 to celebrate HA's 20th year of operation.

== See also ==
- Narcotics Anonymous
- Cocaine Anonymous
- Methadone
- Suboxone
- List of twelve-step groups
- Recovery model
- Self-help groups for mental health
- Substance use disorder
