= List of twelve-step groups =

This is a list of notable twelve-step recovery programs and fellowships. These programs, and the groups of people who follow them, are based on the set of guiding principles for recovery from addictive, compulsive, or other behavioral problems originally developed by Alcoholics Anonymous. The twelve-step method has been adapted widely by fellowships of people recovering from various addictions, compulsive behaviors, and mental health problems. Additionally, some programs have adapted the twelve-step approach in part.

== Programs patterned after Alcoholics Anonymous ==
Fellowships in this section follow reasonably close variations of the Twelve Steps and Twelve Traditions of Alcoholics Anonymous.

- AA – Alcoholics Anonymous
- ACA – Adult Children of Alcoholics & Dysfunctional Families, for those who were raised in alcoholic and other dysfunctional families
- Al-Anon/Alateen, for friends and families of alcoholics, associated with AA
- CA – Cocaine Anonymous
- CLA – Clutterers Anonymous
- CMA – Crystal Meth Anonymous
- Co-Anon, for friends and family of cocaine addicts, associated with Cocaine Anonymous
- CoDA – Co-Dependents Anonymous, for people working to end patterns of dysfunctional relationships and develop functional and healthy relationships
- COSLAA – CoSex and Love Addicts Anonymous, for friends and family of people with a sex or love addiction, associated with SLAA
- DA – Debtors Anonymous
- EA – Emotions Anonymous, for recovery from mental and emotional illness
- FA – Families Anonymous, for relatives and friends of addicts
- FA – Food Addicts in Recovery Anonymous
- FAA – Food Addicts Anonymous
- GA – Gamblers Anonymous
- Gam-Anon and Gam-A-Teen, for friends and family members of problem gamblers
- HA – Heroin Anonymous
- MA – Marijuana Anonymous
- NA – Narcotics Anonymous
- N/A – Neurotics Anonymous, for recovery from mental and emotional illness
- Nar-Anon, for friends and family members of addicts
- NicA – Nicotine Anonymous
- OA – Overeaters Anonymous
- PA – Pills Anonymous, for recovery from prescription pill addiction
- RA – Racists Anonymous
- SA – Sexaholics Anonymous
- SAA – Sex Addicts Anonymous
- SCA – Sexual Compulsives Anonymous
- SIA – Survivors of Incest Anonymous
- SLAA – Sex and Love Addicts Anonymous
- SRA – Sexual Recovery Anonymous
- UA – Underearners Anonymous
- WA – Workaholics Anonymous

== Programs partially patterned after Alcoholics Anonymous ==
Fellowships in this section use material from Alcoholics Anonymous, and credit its influence but do not necessarily follow both the Twelve Steps and Twelve Traditions of AA.

- Celebrate Recovery, Christian-focused twelve-step program for recovery from various behaviors
- Courage International, Catholic ministry which ministers to homosexuals
- Family Services Addiction Recovery Program, program affiliated with The Church of Jesus Christ of Latter-day Saints that uses twelve-step principles
- GROW, a peer support and mutual aid organization for recovery from, and prevention of, serious mental illness
- Homosexuals Anonymous, an organization using 14 steps (five of which are derived from the twelve-steps) as a method of conversion therapy.
- Pagans in recovery (PIR), for neopagans recovering from various compulsive/addictive behaviors
- Parents Anonymous (PA), for parents who have abused children
- Recovering from Religion, an international non-profit organization that helps people who have left religion, are in the process of leaving, or are dealing with problems arising out of theistic doubt or non-belief.
- Schizophrenics Anonymous (SA), for people who are affected by schizophrenia

== See also ==
- Drug addiction recovery groups
- Self-help groups for mental health
- Twelve-step program
