= Nicotine Anonymous =

Twelve-step program

Nicotine Anonymous (NicA) is a twelve-step program founded in 1982 for people desiring to quit smoking and live free of nicotine. As of July 2017, there are over 700 face-to-face meetings in 32 countries worldwide with the majority of these meetings occurring in the United States, Iran, India, Canada, Brazil, the United Kingdom, Australia, Russia and in various online community and social media platforms.. NicA maintains that total abstinence from nicotine is necessary for recovery. NicA defines abstinence as "a state that begins when all use of nicotine ceases".

== History ==
The first meetings began in February 1982 one on one meetings between a group of Southern California AA members to focus specifically on smoking cessation. These meetings began under the name Smokers Anonymous in Los Angeles. In June 1982 the founders, Rodger F, Robert K, Stephanie S, Dan H, began holding group meetings in Santa Monica California. Shortly thereafter another group independently started in San Francisco.

In 1983, a Manhattan, New York group of meetings formed independently, also formed by recovering AA members, specifically to address their smoking addiction. They called themselves "AA for Non-Smokers". During the same period, two groups started in Cleveland, Ohio.

Then in May 1985, Maurice Z., a California member, authored an article for Reader’s Digest. Thousands of letters poured in from people wanting to know more about this new Twelve-Step fellowship. That year Smokers Anonymous groups started independently in Woodstock, NY and in Islip, NY. Within a year there were a hundred meetings identified.

In 1986 the group members met for their first conference in Bakersfield, California to form a fellowship, originally known as Smokers Anonymous.

These groups met again in 1987 in Monterey, California. In April 1988, the fellowship’s first official World Services Conference was held in San Francisco.

The fellowship was renamed Nicotine Anonymous in Phoenix, Arizona at the 1990 World Services Conference because the Smokers Anonymous trademark was not available, but also, importantly, the delegates decided the focus of recovery should be on the drug nicotine rather than any single nicotine delivery system.

In 2000, "NicA" was selected to abbreviate Nicotine Anonymous at the annual World Service Conference.

== Structure ==
Adapted with permission of Alcoholics Anonymous World Services, Inc., the Twelve Traditions are utilized by Nicotine Anonymous as fundamental guiding principles. Nicotine Anonymous operates with an elected, all volunteer, nine member board of officers and a set of by-laws. The board meets regularly to discuss how to be of service to the organization including organizing its annual World Service Conference and monitoring a number of appointed committee coordinators and the Nicotine Anonymous World Service home office located in Dallas, TX. The office keeps regularly updated meeting lists, manages the website and its online store, distributes NicA literature and free Meeting Starter Kits, and serves as a resource for members or any interested nicotine user. There are no dues or fees for NicA membership, as stated in Tradition Three: "the only requirement for Nicotine Anonymous membership is a desire to stop using nicotine."

== Comparison ==
There are several commercial and nonprofit programs supporting smoking cessation programs in the United States. Low-cost options, in addition to Nicotine Anonymous, are sponsored by groups such as The American Cancer Society, The American Lung Association, The American Heart Association and The Seventh-day Adventist Church. Commercial programs include cognitive-behavioral group therapy, nicotine replacement therapies and bupropion. Combinations of these approaches, marketed in commercial packages such as Smokeless and Smoke Stoppers, are licensed to treatment providers and conducted on an inpatient or outpatient basis. These are in addition to local programs ran by regional treatment facilities.

A weekly NicA meeting is ongoing and therefore unique among the array of treatment options because nicotine users and ex-nicotine users can enter and leave the process as they please. Most other treatment programs are structured as limited duration programs, with only a certain number of sessions, making it difficult for members to pick it up midway through or begin when a program is not being offered.

In 1996, NicA ranked twelfth in size among the thirteen twelve-step organizations studied by Klaus Makela. Sponsorship and lifetime attendance is not emphasized as much as in other twelve-step programs. The average meeting size is about seven people.

Although both drinking and smoking are recognized by many respondents as imposing burdens on the family, there are no auxiliary support groups for friends and family of smokers related to NicA; as Al-Anon meetings were created for friends and family members of alcoholics. Nicotine Anonymous World Services does, however, offer a pamphlet, Are You Concerned About Someone Who Smokes or Chews Tobacco? with information for friends and family of nicotine users.

== Effectiveness ==
Success in achieving smoking abstinence using current smoking therapies such as Nicotine Anonymous, cognitive-behavioral group therapy, nicotine replacement therapies and bupropion (Zyban) ranges from 9% to 40% in different studies. Alcoholics and drug addicts have better smoking cessation success rates when attempting to quit smoking early in recovery. Combining psychosocial and pharmacological treatments increases smoking cessation success rates. Acupuncture, hypnosis, inpatient treatment, and Nicotine Anonymous have not been shown effective thus far.

In a controlled study 205 alcoholics, with heavy tobacco dependence (an average of 26.8 cigarettes per day) and three months or more of continuous abstinence from drugs and alcohol, were placed at random in one of three treatment groups: an American Lung Association Quit Program plus Nicotine Anonymous meetings group, a behavioral counseling plus physical exercise group, or a behavioral counseling plus nicotine gum group. The effectiveness of the treatment programs was measured at post-treatment, six months, and twelve-months following post-treatment based on self-reports confirmed by confirmed biochemical and informant reports. Immediately following treatment the behavior counseling and exercise group had the highest quit percentage (60%) followed by the behavioral counseling plus nicotine gum group, with the ALA quit program plus NicA group at 31%. At the six-month follow up all groups had similar percentages of members maintaining abstinence from tobacco (29%, 27%, and 21%, respectively) and also at twelve-months (27%, 27%, and 26%, respectively). Out of all the participants, only 4% relapsed on alcohol or drugs. The alcohol relapse rate did not differ by treatment group.

== Demographics ==
In a survey of 104 smokers (ages 18 and older) 78% reported they believed spiritual resources could be helpful in an attempt to quit smoking. In the same survey, male smokers, ages 31 and over, and females were found to be significantly more open to using spiritual resources in the smoking cessation process than controls. Heavy smokers, those smoking more than fifteen cigarettes per day, were also significantly more receptive to encouragement of spiritual resources in an attempt to quit.

Alcoholics may have experienced twelve-step approaches to recovery and therefore may be more open to the possibility that same approach can be used to initiate and maintain abstinence from tobacco use. The first edition of Nicotine Anonymous: The Book published results of an internal survey of members showing that 25% of members responding to a survey on the topic reported they had prior twelve-step experience. Many smokers do not see group treatment as a potentially useful.

== Literature ==
Nicotine Anonymous publishes eight books, sixteen pamphlets, two CDs, and one newsletter. Nicotine Anonymous: The Book explains the various principles of the Twelve Steps as they apply to nicotine addiction and includes testimonials from NicA members. Nicotine Anonymous Newcomer’s Booklet is a pocket sized booklet that answers common questions about the program and includes helpful tips. Nicotine Anonymous Step Study Workbook briefly discusses aspects of each Step and is followed by questions for the member to answer. Our Path to Freedom: Twelve Stories of Recovery includes testimonials from NicA members. 90 Days, 90 Ways has 90 daily meditations on topics related to recovery from nicotine addiction. A Year of Miracles has 366 daily meditations further expanding on topics related to recovery from nicotine addiction. The Twelve Traditions of Nicotine Anonymous (Extended Version) includes a complete copy of the explanations for all Twelve Traditions. Bylaws of Nicotine Anonymous has the rules and regulations for how Nicotine Anonymous World Services operates.

The pamphlets provide information to new and prospective members, and include titles as follows: Introducing Nicotine Anonymous; To the Newcomer and Sponsorship in Nicotine Anonymous; Out Policy of Openness; How Nicotine Anonymous Works; Nicotine Anonymous the Program and the Tools; A Nicotine User's View of the Twelve Steps; The Serenity Prayer for Nicotine Users; Slogans to Help Us be Happy, Joyous, and Free Living Without Nicotine; Abstinence: What is it?; Tips for Gaining Freedom From Nicotine; Facing the Fatal Attraction; To the Dipper and Chewer; Our Promises; World Services, My intergroup, and Me; Introducing Nicotine Anonymous to the Medical Profession; Are You Concerned About Someone Who Smokes or Chews Tobacco? For the Friends and Family of Nicotine Addicts. Voices of NicA is a CD that has audio shares from members covering their experience, strength and hope in their nicotine recovery. There is also a CD with an audio content of Nicotine Anonymous: The Book and Our Path to Freedom. Seven Minutes is a quarterly newsletter used to keep members informed about developments within the organization and members’ recovery contributions.

- Nicotine Anonymous World Services (September 2004). Nicotine Anonymous: The Book (3rd ed.). Huntington Beach, CA: Nicotine Anonymous World Services. ISBN 978-0-9770115-0-6. OCLC 32687553.
- Nicotine Anonymous World Services (August 2003). Our Path to Freedom: Twelve Stories of Recovery. Huntington Beach, CA: Nicotine Anonymous World Services. ISBN 978-0-9770115-1-3.
- Nicotine Anonymous World Services (October 2004). 90 Days, 90 Ways. Huntington Beach, CA: Nicotine Anonymous World Services. ISBN 978-0-9770115-2-0.
- Nicotine Anonymous World Services (April 2008). A Year of Miracles (1st ed.). Huntington Beach, CA: Nicotine Anonymous World Services. ISBN 978-0-9770115-4-4.
- Nicotine Anonymous World Services (2012). Nicotine Anonymous Newcomer's Booklet. Dallas, TX: Nicotine Anonymous World Services.

== Analysis ==
A NicA pamphlet, Tips for Gaining Freedom from Nicotine, was reviewed in 1999 by a convenience sample of twelve professional colleagues of psychologist Edward Lichtenstein. These professionals were asked to review the cessation tips from the pamphlet and rate them on whether they were cognitive, behavioral, or neither. To that extent, they also rated how consistent the tips were with current cognitive-behavioral cessation techniques. It was found that many of the tips were very consistent with modern cognitive-behavioral smoking cessation treatment programs. The cognitive behavioral tips included setting dates, making commitments, planning things to keep one's mind off smoking, having something to fidget with, having something to put in one's mouth, rewarding oneself when goals have been met, remembering that discomfort associated with withdrawal will subside within two weeks. One tip was found to be spiritual, "Pray instead of puff". Since 1999 many of the NicA pamphlets have been updated and current versions may not contain the information analyzed.

== See also ==
- Addiction recovery groups
- List of twelve-step groups
- Nicotine
- Smoking
- Allen Carr
- Joel Spitzer
