= Sobriety coin =

Token used in addiction programs

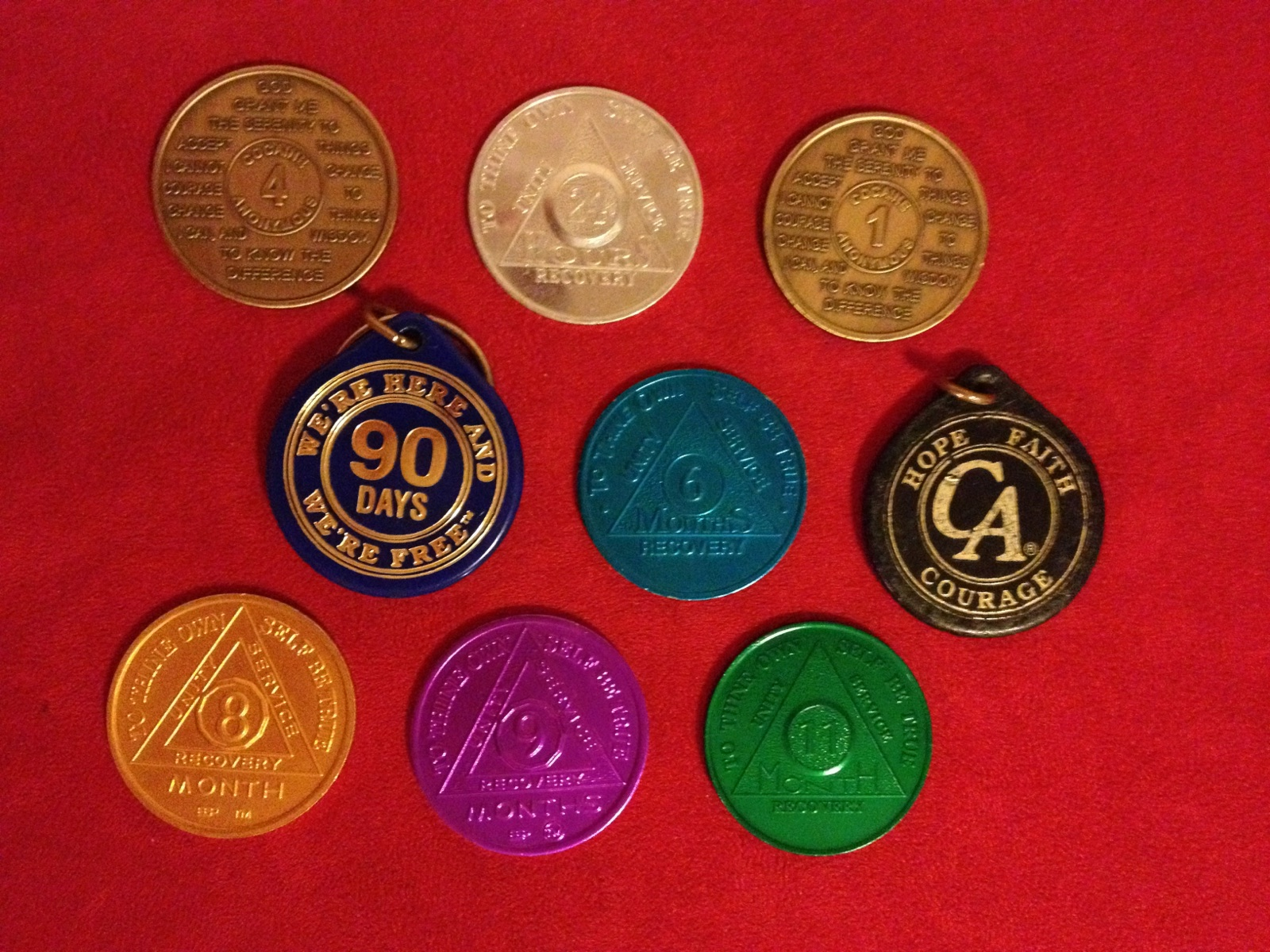
Cocaine Anonymous sobriety coins

A sobriety coin is a token given to Alcoholics Anonymous or other twelve-step program members representing the amount of time the member has remained sober. It is traditionally a medallion the size of a poker chip, 34 mm (1.34 in) (standard) or 39 mm (1.5 in) in diameter. In other twelve-step programs it is to mark time abstaining from whatever the recipient has committed to renounce. There is no official AA medallion or chip. They are used in AA culture but not officially conference-approved, and the AA logo has not been granted for use on medallions.

== History ==
Alcoholics Anonymous was not the first organization to use sobriety chips: other temperance societies gave medallions to those who swore to stop drinking/using and to track the duration of their sobriety.

=== First use ===
Dr. Bob and the Good Old Timers, the history book for Alcoholics Anonymous, discusses the work of Sister Ignatia in Akron, a nun who was devoted to assisting early members of AA and was known for passing out coins to these members. In this book, it states, "Sister Ignatia gave each of her newly released patients a Sacred Heart Medallion, which she asked them to return before they took the first drink. She would occasionally give out St. Christopher and St. George medals as well."

=== Use in AA ===
The actual history of how the AA chip came about after this is still a mystery. It is believed to have originated in 1942 in Indianapolis. The man who began the Alcoholics Anonymous section in Indianapolis, Doherty S., is thought to have started the sobriety coin tradition within this section of AA.

The Portland group (Maine) began a tradition of using colored poker chips to mark time of sobriety.

As each section of AA saw fit, it joined in on the sobriety coin custom. As private companies saw these coins being used, they began to manufacture “AA” chips (even though they were not affiliated with Alcoholics Anonymous) and sell them to different sections. It is believed that the company that made the modern chip as we know it today occurred in Minneapolis in 1965. Wendells Inc. from Ramsey, Minnesota, began manufacturing the raised center bronze AA Medallion in 1973. The Wendells medallion is the most common bronze coin given by AA members.

== Coin design ==
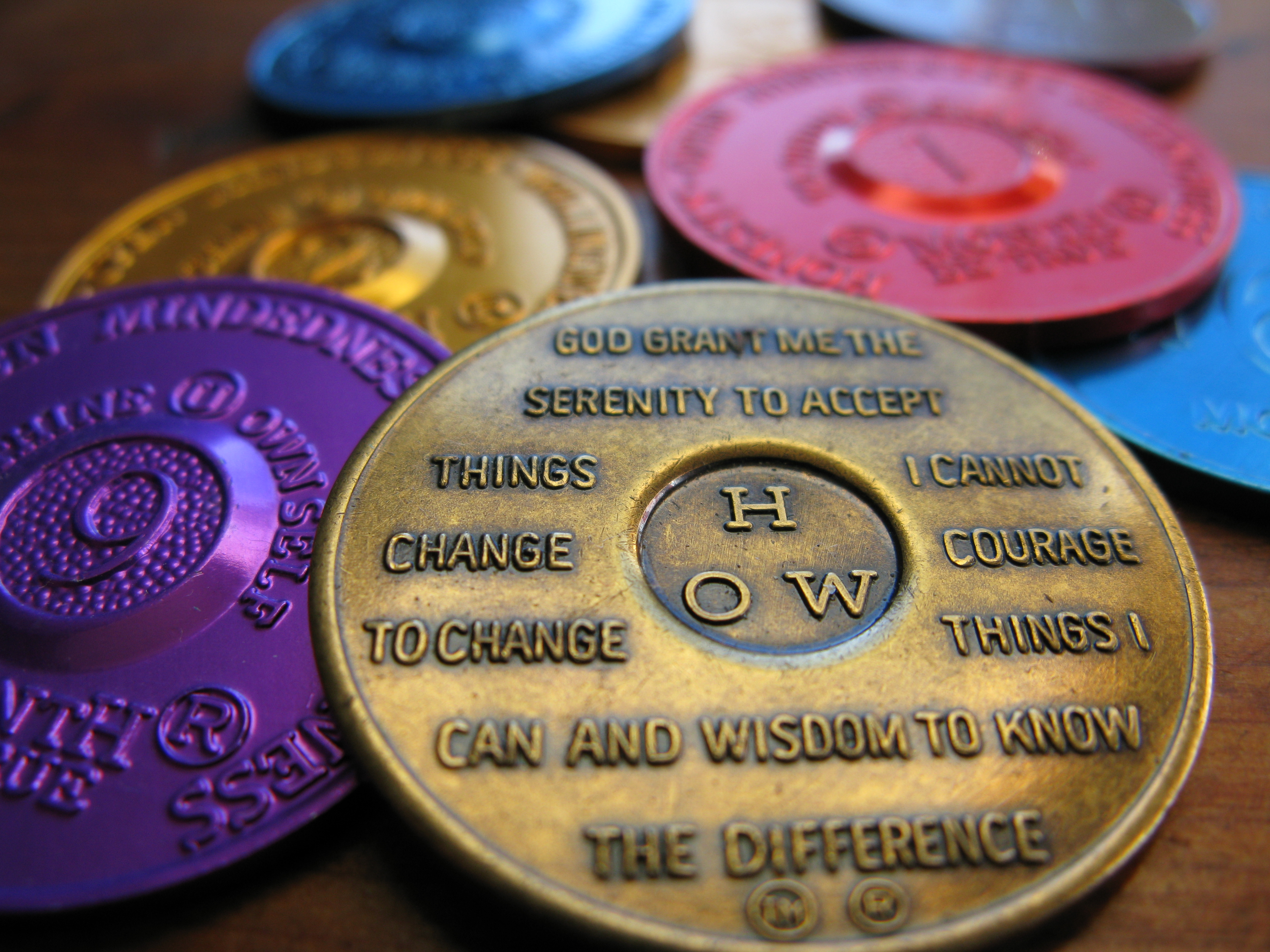
Several Alcoholics Anonymous tokens

To show how far along each person is in their sobriety, most AA groups use a chip of a particular color or alloy that constitutes a range of time that person has been sober. These different-colored chips and values are meant to be tokens of inspiration and a reminder of just how long the member has been sober and how far that member has come. It is evident that "early on, many people in A.A. carried personal mementos to remind themselves of the importance of their sobriety". From personal mementos to coins, the practice of giving out something such as a sobriety chip represents the will and desire that a person has to quit drinking. The practice of giving sobriety chips in AA is attributed to a group in Elmira, New York, in 1947. The celebration of birthdays came from the Oxford group, where members celebrated the anniversary of their spiritual rebirth; in Alcoholics Anonymous, people choose the anniversary of the date of their first full day without a drink. There are thirteen basic coins that are given to members within their first year of sobriety. Generally, coins are given at one month, three months, six months, and nine months of sobriety in the first year. After this, coins are given after each yearly milestone.

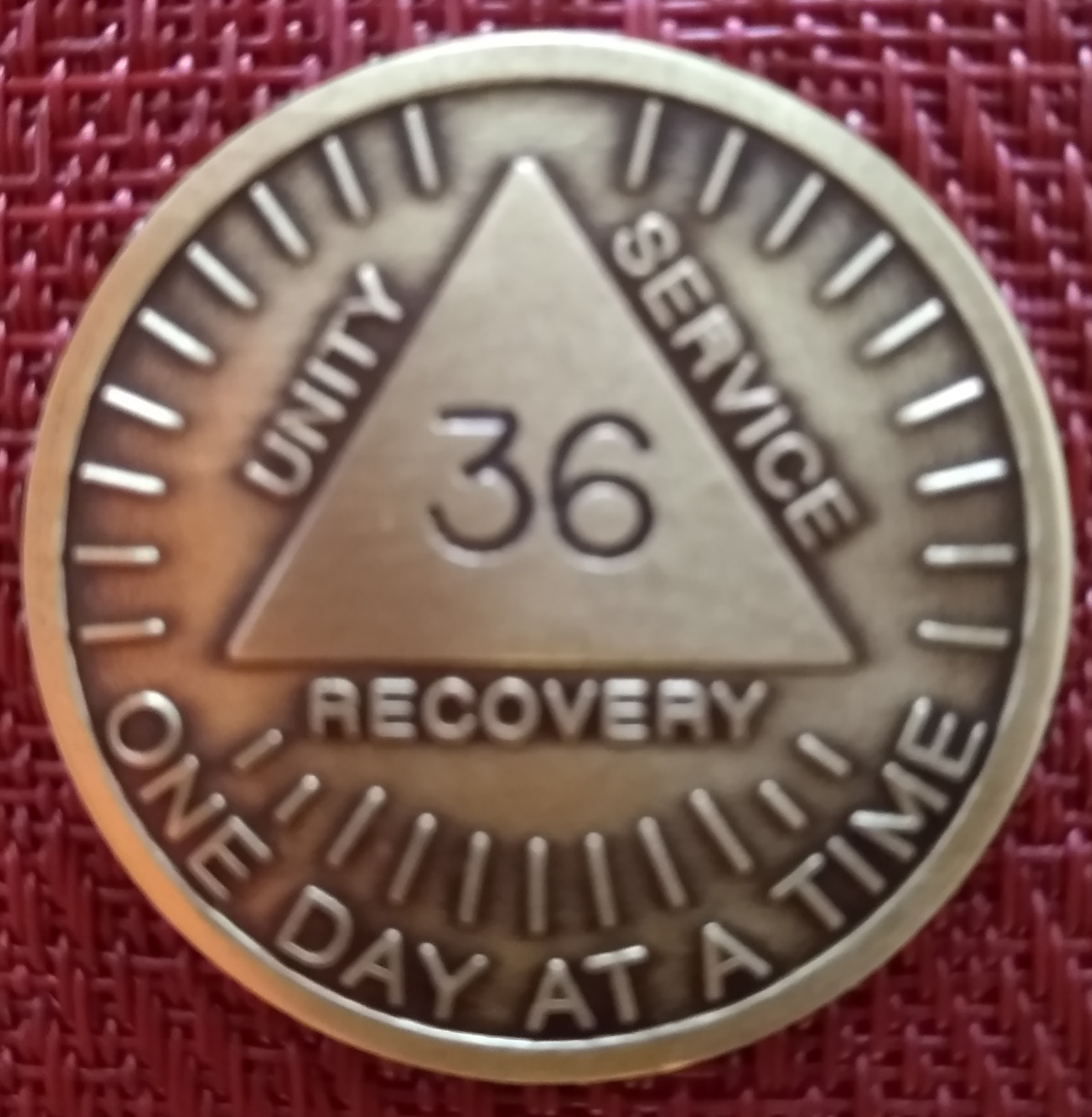
A 36-year sobriety coin given to a 59-year-old member at a meeting in Methuen, Massachusetts

Typical coin milestone colors:

1. Silver Chip – 24 hours of sobriety
2. Red Chip – 30 days/1 month of sobriety
3. Gold Chip – 60 days/2 months of sobriety
4. Green Chip – 90 days/3 months of sobriety
5. Purple Chip – 4 months of sobriety
6. Pink Chip – 5 months of sobriety
7. Dark Blue Chip – 6 months of sobriety
8. Copper Chip – 7 months of sobriety
9. Red Chip – 8 months of sobriety
10. Purple Chip – 9 months of sobriety
11. Gold Chip – 10 months of sobriety
12. Green Chip – 11 months of sobriety
13. Bronze Chip – 1 year of sobriety.

"The chip system is optional and not a part of all A.A. groups nationally or worldwide." In 2011, the General Service Office of Alcoholics Anonymous estimated that there were about 58,000 Alcoholic Anonymous groups throughout the United States. All the chips after the one-year chip are traditionally also bronze. There are special novelty chips that come in other metals, colors, types and designs. Common premium sobriety chips are gold- and silver-plated, colored and sometimes coated in a clear epoxy dome.
