= Crystal Meth Anonymous =

Methamphetamine recovery charity in California

- Abbreviation: CMA
- Formation: September 16, 1994
- Founder: Bill C.
- Founded at: West Hollywood, California, United States
- Type: Non-profit; Public-benefit corporation Twelve-step program
- Legal status: Active
- Purpose: Recovery from methamphetamine addiction through twelve-step program
- Headquarters: Los Angeles, California, United States
- Region served: Worldwide
- Services: Peer support meetings, helpline
- Methods: Twelve-step program, peer support
- Fields: Addiction recovery
- Members: Open to anyone with a desire to stop using
- Official language: Multiple languages
- Main organ: General Service Conference
- Website: www.crystalmeth.org

Crystal Meth Anonymous (CMA) is a California-based non-profit, public-benefit corporation founded in 1994. The members of the fellowship of Crystal Meth Anonymous work a twelve-step program of recovery with recovering crystal meth addicts. Participants in local groups meet in order to help others recover from methamphetamine addiction. CMA advocates complete abstinence from methamphetamine, alcohol, inhalants, and all medications not taken as prescribed.

== History ==
CMA was founded on September 16, 1994 in West Hollywood, California by Bill C., a member of the 12 step recovery community in Los Angeles for over two decades at the time. The first group held its first meeting at the West Hollywood Alcohol and Drug Center. As of 2015, CMA had a presence in over 100 metropolitan areas of the United States, as well as parts of the United Kingdom, Canada, Australia, and Iran. The first CMA World Service Conference was held in Park City, Utah in October 2008, during which the CMA Conference Charter was adopted. The purpose of the conference is to bring together elected delegates from CMA groups from across the world to meet as guardians of the world services and of the Twelve Steps and Twelve Traditions of CMA, the same Twelve Steps and Twelve Traditions followed by Alcoholics Anonymous. The conference does not act as a governing body of CMA, but rather as the service body for the organization.

At the first General Service Conference, the delegates adopted that:

The Fellowship of Crystal Meth Anonymous works a Twelve Step program of recovery. We have not felt the need to elaborate in great detail a specific CMA approach to the Twelve Steps: too many other excellent outlines already exist for following these spiritual principles. But our experience has shown that without the Steps we could not stay sober.

As of 2026, CMA has approximately 863 meetings across 17 countries and 44 US states and territories.

== Membership ==
CMA has a single requirement for membership: "a desire to stop using." There are no dues or fees for membership; the organization is self-supporting through voluntary contributions from its members.

Members themselves determine their addiction status. CMA explicitly states that "only you can answer that question. No one in Crystal Meth Anonymous will tell you whether you're an addict or not."

CMA is not affiliated with any religion, sect, denomination, political group, organization, or institution. The fellowship neither endorses nor opposes any causes, focusing solely on its primary purpose of helping members achieve and maintain sobriety from methamphetamine and other substances.

== The Program ==
=== The Twelve Steps ===
CMA's program of recovery is based on the Twelve Steps originally developed by Alcoholics Anonymous, adapted for crystal meth addiction. The fellowship adopted these steps, stating: "The Fellowship of Crystal Meth Anonymous works a Twelve Step program of recovery. We have not felt the need to elaborate in great detail a specific CMA approach to the Twelve Steps: too many other excellent outlines already exist for following these spiritual principles."

The Twelve Steps guide members through a process of personal transformation: acknowledging powerlessness over addiction, turning to a Higher Power as each member understands it, taking a personal moral inventory, making amends for past harms, and carrying the message to others who still suffer. Working the steps is suggested but not required for membership. They are designed to bring about what AA literature describes as "an entire psychic change" or spiritual awakening that enables lasting recovery.

=== The Twelve Traditions ===
The Twelve Traditions provide guidelines that help CMA groups maintain unity and focus on their primary purpose. Rooted in the same traditions observed by Alcoholics Anonymous, they establish that membership is open to anyone with a desire to stop using and that no dues or fees are required. The traditions describe a non-hierarchical, non-professional fellowship in which individual groups are autonomous yet bound by a shared responsibility to CMA as a whole. They call for the organization to remain self-supporting through its own contributions, to avoid outside affiliations and public controversies, and to protect the anonymity of its members at the level of press, radio, and films.

=== Sponsorship ===
Members are encouraged to find an experienced fellow recovering addict, called a "sponsor," to help them understand and follow the twelve-step program. A sponsor is typically someone who has worked through all twelve steps themselves and who shares their own experience, strength, and hope rather than imposing personal views. Sponsors help newcomers navigate the challenges of early recovery, though finding and working with a sponsor is suggested rather than mandatory. Following the helper therapy principle, sponsors often benefit from their relationships with sponsees, as helping others reinforces their own recovery.

=== Spirituality and Religion ===
CMA is a spiritual program but is not affiliated with any religion. The concept of a "Higher Power" or "God as we understood Him" in the Twelve Steps is left entirely to each individual's interpretation. Members may understand their Higher Power as a traditional religious deity, as the group itself or the collective strength of the fellowship, as nature, humanity, or the universe, or as any personal, non-religious conception of spirituality—whatever provides strength beyond oneself."What About God?" (PDF). Crystal Meth Anonymous. The program emphasizes that a spiritual awakening is key to recovery, while leaving the meaning of that awakening to each person. CMA welcomes people of all faiths and no faith, maintaining that spiritual growth—however individually understood—enables the fundamental change in thinking necessary for lasting recovery from addiction.

== Meetings ==
=== Overview ===
CMA meetings provide a space where members share their experience, strength, and hope with each other to maintain sobriety and help others recover. Meeting formats are determined by each group's autonomy, but most follow a common structure: opening readings (often including the Twelve Steps, Twelve Traditions, or a CMA preamble), member sharing about their recovery experiences, and closing statements with an optional group prayer or affirmation. A voluntary contribution basket is passed in keeping with the Seventh Tradition, by which groups are self-supporting. A core principle emphasized at meetings is anonymity: what is shared in meetings is confidential and stays within the meeting space. A full list of meetings can be found on the CMA Website (https://crystalmeth.org/meetings).

=== Types of Meetings ===
CMA offers various meeting formats to serve different needs.

Open meetings are accessible to anyone, including non-addicts such as family members, friends, students, or professionals interested in learning about CMA. Closed meetings are reserved exclusively for individuals who identify as having a desire to stop using crystal meth or other substances.

Speaker meetings feature one or more members who share their personal stories of addiction and recovery. Step meetings focus on discussing one of the Twelve Steps in depth. Literature meetings involve reading and discussing passages from CMA literature or related twelve-step texts. Sharing meetings provide an open format for members to speak about their experiences, with or without a predetermined topic.

In-person meetings take place at physical locations such as community centers, churches, or treatment facilities. Online meetings connect members virtually through video conferencing platforms, making CMA accessible regardless of geographic location. Hybrid meetings allow participants to attend either in person or virtually.

Hospital & Institutional (H&I) meetings are held in treatment centers, hospitals, and correctional facilities to carry the message to those who cannot attend regular meetings.

=== Meeting Locations and Accessibility ===
As of 2026, CMA holds approximately 863 meetings worldwide across 17 countries and 44 U.S. states and territories. The fellowship has experienced significant growth in urban centers as well as smaller cities and towns.

A meeting finder is available on the CMA website to help individuals locate meetings by location, time, and format. Meetings are available in multiple languages in some regions, and some meetings are specifically designated for certain demographics (such as LGBTQ+ individuals, women, men, or young people) while remaining open to all who meet the membership requirement.

=== Service Structure ===
CMA's General Service Office is located in Los Angeles, California, serving as the administrative hub for world services. The organization operates across three levels: individual groups conduct their own affairs at the local level; area services provide regional coordination across multiple groups; and general services support the fellowship as a whole, including literature production, website maintenance, and the annual General Service Conference.

Service opportunities are available to all members. Within individual groups, members may take on roles such as secretary, treasurer, greeter, or literature coordinator. At the area level, members participate in service committees, and at the general level they may serve on Hospital & Institutions (H&I) committees, literature and publications committees, website and technology services, or the World Service Conference delegation. All service work is performed by volunteers, consistent with the Eighth Tradition that CMA remains non-professional.

== Services ==
=== Helpline ===
CMA operates a helpline at 1-855-METH-FREE (1-855-638-4373) to provide information and support to those seeking help with methamphetamine addiction.

== Demographics ==
=== Background Context ===
Methamphetamine addiction has been recognized as a significant public health issue in the United States and internationally. In 2002, the U.S. Department of Health and Human Services estimated 12 million people, age 12 and over, had used methamphetamine—600,000 of which were estimated to be current users—with a growth rate of approximately 300,000 new users per year.

Research has documented specific health risks associated with methamphetamine use. In 2005, a Los Angeles clinic estimated that one out of three gay or bisexual HIV-positive men admitted to using methamphetamine. Methamphetamine lowers a user's inhibitions, increasing the likelihood of engaging in unprotected sex and sharing needles. These public health concerns provided part of the context for CMA's founding and growth, particularly in communities significantly affected by methamphetamine use. While CMA has significant membership from the LGBTQ+ community, the fellowship serves anyone with a desire to stop using regardless of sexual orientation, gender-identity, race, religion, age, other personal identifiers.

=== CMA Membership Demographics ===
The 2024 CMA Fellowship Survey gathered responses from 1,828 members representing 21 countries and 45 U.S. states, providing insight into the fellowship's composition.

The 2024 Fellowship Survey respondents demonstrated diversity across age, gender identity, ethnicity, and sexual orientation, with a median age of 45 years. While CMA has significant membership from the LGBTQ+ community, the fellowship serves a diverse population across all sexual orientations and gender identities.

== Effectiveness ==
A self-selected study limited to men who had sex with other men, used meth, and attended CMA, showed that, after three months of participation in CMA, participants reported their number of sexual partners had fallen from seven to less than one, and self-reports of unprotected anal intercourse when using methamphetamine fell by two-thirds. In a six-month follow-up, 20% had used it again once and 64% had remained abstinent.

The 2024 Fellowship Survey provides additional self-reported data on recovery outcomes. Among survey respondents, 28% reported maintaining 6 or more years of continuous sobriety, while 55% had under 2 years clean. Seventy-four percent of respondents acknowledged experiencing relapse as part of their recovery journey. High engagement levels were reported, with 77% attending two or more meetings weekly and 33% attending daily. Respondents noted that every area of their lives that were negative impacted by their drug use has shown positive improvements due to their recovery process. These self-reported findings suggest that regular meeting attendance and fellowship engagement are common among CMA members maintaining recovery, though as with all self-selected survey data, results may not represent all CMA participants.

== Literature ==
CMA publishes its own literature and also recommends literature from Alcoholics Anonymous and other twelve-step programs.

=== CMA-Specific Literature ===
- Crystal Clear: Stories of Hope. Crystal Meth Anonymous, Inc. 2011. ISBN 978-1-4507-7770-4.
- Expressions of Hope: Crystal Meth Addicts in Recovery. NYCMA, Inc. 2012. ISBN 978-0-6156-8053-8.
- The Twelve Steps for Crystal Meth Addicts. NYCMA Books. 2023. ISBN 979-8853537286.
- Voices of the Fellowship: Our Recovery. Crystal Meth Anonymous. October 2021. ISBN 979-8-4845-2051-0.
- A Sober Cell: From the Inside Looking Out. Crystal Meth Anonymous. May 2022. ISBN 979-8-4472-3246-7.
- Out of the Fog: Stories of Recovery from London. Crystal Meth Anonymous UK. 2018. ISBN 978-1-5272-2824-5.
- Voices of the Fellowship: Our Families. Crystal Meth Anonymous. October 2025. ISBN 979-8-2695-6374-9.
- Various CMA pamphlets on recovery topics

=== Recommended Literature from Other Fellowships ===
- Alcoholics Anonymous: The Story of how Many Thousands of Men and Women have Recovered from Alcoholism (4th ed.). New York City: Alcoholics Anonymous World Services. 2001. ISBN 978-1-893007-16-1. LCCN 2001094693. OCLC 864485735.
- Twelve Steps and Twelve Traditions. Alcoholics Anonymous World Services, Inc. 2012. ISBN 978-0-916856-01-4. LCCN 53-5454. OCLC 13572433.

CMA also produces speaker recordings, personal recovery stories, meditations, and international readings available through its website and service office.

== See also ==
- Addiction recovery groups
- List of twelve-step groups
- Narcotics Anonymous
- Alcoholics Anonymous
- Mutual aid
- Peer support
