= Association of Recovering Motorcyclists =

Independent motorcycle association

- Abbreviation: ARM
- Founded: 1986; 40 years ago
- Founder: Jack and Judy Jensen
- Founded at: Wisconsin
- Type: Independent motorcycle association
- Purpose: ARM is the world's largest clean and sober motorcycle association
- Region served: America, Australia, England, Canada, Denmark, Germany, Guam, New Zealand, Norway, Sweden, Poland, Thailand, Netherlands
- Website: www.armintlllc.net

The Association of Recovering Motorcyclists (ARM) is an independent motorcycle association, founded in 1986 by Jack and Judy Jensen. The association currently have over 100 chapters in the United States, Canada, Australia, Sweden, Denmark, Germany, Guam, England, New Zealand, Norway, Poland, Thailand and Netherlands.

== History ==
The group grew quickly in the 1980s, partly attributed to not being organized along the lines of an outlaw motorcycle club, according to Judy Jensen, such as by having the word "Independent" rather than "MC" (motorcycle club) under the ARM logo, avoiding conflict over territory or membership that would have discouraged members from joining. Judy Jensen has also officiated at weddings, where she read from a Harley-Davidson owners manual on the "importance of a good union between the oil pump and the seal, and baptized the couple with a dab of motor oil.

== Structure ==
Members must meet certain standards of abstinence from drugs and alcohol in order to gain and retain membership status, and must own and maintain a motorcycle of 500 cc or greater. Members are required to be part of a 12-step program.

ARM and its sister organization, Recovering Women Riders (RWR), do not publish head counts, however, they state "there is always room for one more." A contingent of ARM members was among several sober motorcycle clubs that attended the 2006 Founders Day anniversary of AA founder Dr. Bob Smith's sobriety date, June 10, 1935.
