= LifeRing Secular Recovery =

Addiction and recovery organization

- Logo
- Abbreviation: LifeRing (LSR)
- Predecessor: Outgrowth of the Northern California branch of Secular Organizations for Sobriety (SOS)
- Formation: 1999 (as LifeRing Secular Recovery)
- Founder: Martin Nicolaus
- Type: Non-profit organization
- Purpose: Peer-run, abstinence-based addiction recovery support
- Headquarters: Hayward, California, U.S.
- Region served: United States, Canada, Europe
- Services: In-person meetings; online meetings; email support groups; one-to-one support
- President: Craig Whalley (from 2010)
- Key people: Martin Nicolaus (founder)
- Website: www.lifering.org
- Formerly called: LifeRing Press (1997–1999)

LifeRing Secular Recovery (LifeRing or LSR) is a secular, non-profit organization providing peer-run addiction recovery groups. The organization provides support and assistance to people seeking to recover from alcohol and drug addiction, and also assists partners, family members and friends of addicts or alcoholics. It is an abstinence-based recovery program with three fundamental principles: sobriety, secularity and self-empowerment. The motto of LifeRing is "empower your sober self."

LifeRing originated in California in 1997 as LifeRing Press, a publishing company separate from its parent organization, Secular Organizations for Sobriety (SOS). It incorporated officially in 1999 under its present name, and is no longer affiliated with SOS. LifeRing holds face-to-face meetings in the United States, Canada and Europe, and also supports online meetings, chat rooms, and e-mail support groups. Although the organization is non-religious, it caters to people of all faiths or none, and around a quarter of LifeRing members say they attend some form of religious group. Group participants are encouraged to tailor their program to their own needs and circumstances. Each member is free to incorporate ideas from any source they find useful, such as materials from other addiction recovery groups, including religious-supported approaches like that used by Alcoholics Anonymous (AA). LifeRing is a secular alternative to AA.

== History ==
LifeRing was founded in 1997 as LifeRing Press, a publishing company, as an outgrowth out of the northern California branch of Secular Organizations for Sobriety (SOS). Martin Nicolaus was the founder and CEO in 1997, a position he held until 2010 when Craig Whalley took over as president. The LifeRing service center is located in Hayward, California. In 1999, following a meeting of regional representatives, it became LifeRing Secular Recovery, and in 2001 it held its first constitutional congress. The organization holds an annual congress each year where board members are elected. LifeRing is non-profit making and raises all its funds from the sale of books and merchandise, collections at meetings and by donations; although remaining broadly similar in outlook, LifeRing is no longer affiliated with SOS.

=== Disaffiliation from Secular Organizations for Sobriety (SOS) ===
By 1990, autonomous SOS groups had formed in Northern California. In January 1991 those groups incorporated as SOS West Secular Organizations for Sobriety, Inc., while a separate New York nonprofit, Secular Organizations for Sobriety, Inc. (aka SOS, Inc.), was incorporated in February of the same year. The New York nonprofit, SOS, Inc., was affiliated with the Council for Secular Humanism, which at the time was known as the Council for Democratic and Secular Humanism (CODESH). In 1994, SOS, Inc., sued SOS West alleging trademark infringement. The United States District Court for the Northern District of California found that SOS West and its predecessors had prior use of “Secular Organizations for Sobriety”/“SOS” in Northern California and enjoined SOS, Inc. from using that name and initialism in that region. Further, the judge required that if SOS, Inc. advertised or solicited donations in Northern California using the “SOS” name (including online), it had to include a clear disclaimer stating that the local SOS there is a separate group (SOS West) and clarifying that SOS West is not affiliated with CODESH. The United States Court of Appeals for the Ninth Circuit agreed with the regional ruling, but sent the case back to the trial judge to decide whether SOS, Inc.’s federal trademark on “Secular Organizations for Sobriety” should be canceled. In both the district court and on appeal, SOS West prevailed regarding its right to use “SOS” in Northern California—no court required it to change names. Nevertheless, the group chose to rebrand for clarity and future nationwide growth, adopting the LifeRing Secular Recovery name beginning in 1999.

=== Professional recognition ===
LifeRing has been represented by speakers at professional conferences of organizations including the American Psychological Association, the Association of Addiction Professionals (NAADAC), the California Association of Alcoholism and Drug Abuse Counselors (CAADAC), Multiple Pathways of Recovery Conference (2015), and FtBConscience 2 (2014). Further research is needed in order for it to be incorporated into a professional clinical setting, as most of the data available prior to the 2016 study was anecdotal in nature. In the mid-1990s, high-profile cases held that requiring individuals who have been mandated to undergo drug or alcohol rehabilitation to attend a program with religious content is impermissible coercion under the Establishment Clause of the United States Constitution, and thus secular alternatives are needed. Consequently, it has been acknowledged that there is a pressing need for professional recognition of secular groups such as SMART and LifeRing which may encourage them to become more mainstream and widespread.

== Methodology ==
LifeRing graphic 'ring' logo

The LifeRing philosophy is expressed in three principles, known as the 3-S philosophy: Sobriety, Secularity, and Self empowerment. Sobriety is defined as abstinence from alcohol and addictive drugs (prescription or otherwise) unless used as directed by a physician as a legitimate medical treatment. The principle of Self-Empowerment encourages each member to develop his or her own program of recovery. Unlike twelve-step programs, members do not have sponsors, but are encouraged to help each other. In order to participate the ethos is summarized as:

The only requirement for membership in LifeRing Secular Recovery meetings is a desire to abstain from the use of alcohol and illicit or non-medically indicated drugs.

In line with the principle of Secularity, LifeRing meetings do not open with prayers and members are not encouraged to believe in a Higher Power. There is no twelve-step program as with other programs such as Alcoholics Anonymous. LifeRing puts forward the idea that sobriety can be achieved through a personal recovery program and peer support. However, religious faith is not discouraged or disrespected, and a membership survey showed that around one-quarter of LifeRing members also attend some form of religious group.

LifeRing encourages each participant to tailor an approach to maintaining abstinence from addictive drugs or alcohol to his or her own needs and experiences. Members are free to incorporate ideas from any source they find useful, including other addiction recovery groups. Meetings often take place in the locations also used by twelve-step recovery groups. LifeRing encourages members to use relapses as learning experiences and discourages admonishing members for relapsing. Members are encouraged to see inside them a sober self and an addict self which are fighting for dominance, one side is trying to be sober and well, the other is obsessed with the drug and wants to keep drinking or using. It has been reported that attending meetings (whether online, email-based, or face-to-face) provides a good place for the sober self to learn from and be strengthened by the other sober voices there. Meetings are run by volunteer peers, known as 'convenors', not led by professionals, and members are allowed to give each other feedback during them. Members are encouraged to raise their hands when appropriate to address and answer another member to offer support or comment while the meeting is in progress. While the meetings online and face-to-face are informal there are some basic rules: Members should be clean and sober (not under the influence of drugs or alcohol) if they want to speak at a meeting (only the desire to be sober is required for attendance), no religion, politics or demeaning others' attempts to achieve sobriety is allowed, members must stay respectful of one another, and no 'drunkalogues' (long-winded talk of past drug or alcohol use). Despite the secular nature of LifeRing a 2013 membership survey showed that just over a quarter of members attend some form of church or other place of worship, a drop from 40% in 2005.

LifeRing's approach has been described as "a homespun, rather than an academic, product" which comes within the discipline of cognitive behavioral therapy. It is influenced by psychologists such as Carl Rogers and Albert Bandura, and has been compared to William Glasser's choice theory which is based on the idea that past relationships are influential on behavior and addictive behaviors are symptomatic of unconscious psychological needs, and Marsha M. Linehan's dialectical behavior therapy which focuses on learning the triggers to certain types of destructive behavior.

== Meetings and support groups ==
LifeRing has more than 200 weekly in-person meetings in the U.S and some 75 weekly online meetings. LifeRing also have in-person meetings in Canada, Denmark, Ireland, Sweden, Poland and the United Kingdom. Family members and friends of LifeRing members can attend meetings provided they are clean and sober at the time of the meeting. There is no requirement to call oneself an addict or an alcoholic during meetings.- Meetings usually last an hour and are free to attend, however donations are usually solicited. LifeRing also provides daily meetings online, using a chat-room format, and the chat-room is also available outside of scheduled meetings. There are also multiple e-mail support groups including LRSmail which has now been running over 15 years and a group for friends and relatives. There are e-mail groups which in addition to recovery issues also focus on providing support on body image, mental health, LGBTQ, workbook study and convening a meeting. LifeRing hosts email groups (https://lifering.org/email-groups/), LifeRing "E-Pals" - One-to-One Sobriety Support, and has a LifeRing page on Delphi Forum. LifeRing convenors use the book How Was Your Week The convenor will usually begin the meeting by asking "How was your week?" Individuals will contribute their experiences as they feel ready and other members are encouraged to interact and give feedback. Convenors should have a minimum of 6 months continuous sobriety in order to host a meeting and usually attend workshops where possible and keep in touch with other convenors in-person and online.

== Effectiveness ==
LifeRing's success rate was studied in 2016 by the Alcohol Research Group in Emeryville, California, following several applications for funding over the years. The report found that members of LifeRing reported higher levels of satisfaction and cohesion compared to twelve-step participants, despite lower levels of attendance at face-to-face meetings, and concluded that there is a real need for incorporating the LifeRing methodology into existing addiction treatment networks. A 2018 longitudinal study compared the self-reported success of LifeRing, SMART Recovery, Women for Sobriety, and Alcoholics Anonymous. After normalizing for income and other demographic factors, the study saw that LifeRing had fewer members achieving total abstinence than Alcoholics Anonymous; however, after normalizing for treatment goal, LifeRing had the same abstinence rate as AA. In other words, among AA members and members of LifeRing who wanted to abstain from alcohol, both programs had the same success rate.

== Publications ==
- Recovery By Choice: A Workbook is a self-treatment workbook designed to create a personal recovery program. The book is divided into nine sections with questions to be worked through in order to build the program. It is designed to be carried with the person and reworked if necessary, and is intended to bring structure and control back to the recovering addict. Work areas include making a physical assessment of one's body and addressing any areas of concern, looking at one's environment for triggers and practicing suggested exercises to strengthen commitment, planning sober activities to fill time, learning to deal with people who can help or hinder sobriety, practicing ways to handle one's emotions, and deciding on and getting the level of outside help required from professional or self-help groups. The book can also be worked through with a reader if literacy is an issue.
- Empowering Your Sober Self: The LifeRing Approach to Addiction Recovery is a book about the ethos of LifeRing and the strategies it recommends. The book describes the LifeRing approach to sobriety and is written for individuals wishing to be free of addiction, their friends and family and professionals in the field of addiction and recovery. It addresses areas in which it differs from traditional twelve-step support groups as well as other alternative methods of achieving sobriety. It also contains anecdotal stories from LifeRing members and the methods they used to get clean or sober. The book aims to inform people that other sobriety strategies are available outside of those more well known and that the approach is working successfully for many individuals.
- How Was Your Week: Bring People Together in Recovery the LifeRing Way – A Convenors' Handbook is a book written for LifeRing meeting convenors. The book explains how LifeRing meetings are formatted and is aimed at existing convenors and those people who want to convene or set up a new LifeRing meeting either face-to-face or online. In addition to addressing practical issues such as meeting structure, opening and closing formats, and administrative tasks, it also looks at the motivations for holding meetings, the best ways to facilitate a support group and secularity respecting people of all beliefs.
- Humanly Possible: Stories of Secular Recovery is about success in recovery from substance addiction. There are many such books, but what sets this one apart is its emphasis on secular recovery. This book shows that recovery without religion is not only conceivable but readily achievable. These stories come from members of LifeRing Secular Recovery, SMART Recovery, and AA Freethinkers, organizations that seek to help people free themselves from addiction without pressuring them to believe things that are foreign to their world-views. None of those speaking here were powerless over their addiction; they needed to find the needed power within themselves, drawing on the support of their peers for guidance. It is that support -- positive, empathetic and informed -- that plays the key role in helping others gain sobriety. Humanly Possible shows how effective that kind of support can be.

== See also ==
- Drug addiction recovery groups
- Substance abuse
- Substance use disorder
