= Pagans in recovery =

Twelve step program

Pagans in recovery is a phrase, which is frequently used within the recovery community, to describe the collective efforts of Neopagans as well as Indigenous, Hindu, Buddhist, and other like-minded groups, to achieve abstinence or the remission of compulsive/addictive behaviors through twelve-step programs and other programs, such as Alcoholics Anonymous, Narcotics Anonymous, Overeaters Anonymous, Al-Anon/Alateen, etc. These efforts generally focus on modifying or adapting the twelve steps to accommodate the Pagan world-view as well as creating Pagan-friendly twelve step meetings either as part of a preexisting twelve-step program or as independent entities.

== History and development ==
The term 'Pagans in recovery' appears to have first been used in a Neopagan newsletter from Ohio prior to 1989. Isaac Bonewits also used the term in an essay he wrote in 1996. In 2011, The Pagan In Recovery: The Twelve Steps From A Pagan Perspective by Deirdre A. Hebert was published.

Various forms of Pagan-oriented Recovery groups have existed over the course of the last 50 years. In late April of 2014, a Pagans in Recovery meeting was started on Wednesday evening in Atlanta, GA, before moving to an online Zoom meeting format during 2020–2021 at the beginning of the COVID-19 pandemic. During that time, a community of pagans from across the globe came together to create online Zoom meetings, sometimes having up to 3 meetings available per day. The Wednesday Atlanta meeting resumed meeting in person in 2021, and there are currently two in-person Pagans in Recovery meetings in Atlanta, GA (with plans for more in development), one in-person meeting in Nashville, TN, and numerous starting across the United States in addition to the daily online meetings.

The meetings vary in format. Some are oriented towards specific Fellowships and have a focus on AA/Al-anon/SLAA/NA/etc. literature from a pagan perspective (Disclaimer: Pagans in Recovery is not affiliated with any other 12-Step Fellowships) and some allow for the Chairperson to choose from any inspirational text that is applicable in a 12-step Recovery context. The majority are open to people from all 12-step fellowships (both chemical and process addictions) to attend.

There is no singular text that is used by people attending Pagans in Recovery meetings, but The Pagan In Recovery: The Twelve Steps From A Pagan Perspective by Deirdre A. Hebert is a recommended text sometimes used in conjunction with more targeted 12-Step Fellowship Literature and Meetings (AA/NA/Al-anon/ACA/SLAA/OA/etc.).

== Differentiation from other 12-step programs ==
Some traditional twelve-step meetings include Christian prayers and the assumption of a masculine higher power, leading to difficulty in finding supportive sponsors by pagans who do not share those beliefs. Some Pagans find the 12 steps themselves too reminiscent of Christian theology to be applicable to their belief systems. A.A. itself states that any person who "has a desire to stop drinking" may declare themselves a member of A.A.

The focus in alternative groups tends to be on tolerance, balance, building better boundaries, healing old wounds, making amends, taking our power back and right action. As a result, these groups tend to be more in tune with Pagan, New Age, Native American, humanistic, feminist, and Buddhist and Hindu teachings, as well as with the more progressive versions of the mainstream faiths.

Another issue among Pagans in recovery is the one-sided image of addicts, alcoholics, codependents, and survivors of dysfunctional families portrayed in 12-step literature and in the many books published on recovery and dysfunctional family systems since the 1980s. For example, Kasl and others in the field of addiction have long noted that characteristics of adult children of alcoholics and the list known as "The Problem" in ACA, read at every ACA meeting, focus strongly on "character defects" and do not adequately support the creation or celebration of character strengths, strengths which are often the result of surviving these very systems.

Many twelve-step programs, such as Narcotics Anonymous, have special interest groups, typically meetings specifically geared towards young people, men, women, gays and lesbians, etc. Alcoholics Anonymous has also started meetings specifically for Native Americans which accommodate those views of spirituality. Pagans who are recovering alcoholics have started A.A. meetings specifically for Pagans

Many Pagans seem to prefer a mutually supportive, spiritually based twelve step approach to recovery over non-spiritually based programs such as Secular Organizations for Sobriety, where one is expected to keep his or her spiritual beliefs separate from recovery, or Rational Recovery, which is not spiritually based and does not encourage members to seek support from others in recovery. Generally speaking, Pagan twelve step meetings follow the same format as other twelve step meetings except that they use Pagan friendly readings (which have not been approved by the General Service Office of Alcoholics Anonymous or other twelve step organizations), and substitute Pagan friendly prayers for the Lord's Prayer (which is not AA Conference approved, but widely used) and the Serenity Prayer. For example, the Recovery Spiral: A Pagan Path to Healing by Cynthia Jane Collins is sometimes used instead of or along with the Big Book of Alcoholics Anonymous, and the Native American Great Spirit prayer may be substituted for the Lord's Prayer.

Some Pagan twelve-step groups have reworked or reworded the twelve steps so as to make them more applicable to Pagans, especially in allowing for a Polytheistic and non-gendered view of divinity. The members of Pagan twelve step groups are still expected to work the twelve steps as a means of spiritual growth, obtain a sponsor, make amends for harm they have caused, and to help others.

Some twelve-step meetings for Pagans are eclectic, meaning that anyone from a twelve-step recovery program, regardless of the nature of their addiction, may participate in the meeting. This is in sharp contrast to Alcoholics Anonymous' concept of "Singleness of Purpose" which holds that alcoholics should only work with other alcoholics.
