= Darren Sherkat =

American sociologist (born 1965)

Darren E. Sherkat
- Born: December 31, 1965
- Education: University of Tulsa, Duke University
- Awards: 2002 Dean’s Research Appreciation Award from Southern Illinois University
- Scientific career
- Fields: Sociology
- Workplaces: Southern Illinois University Carbondale
- Thesis: Religious socialization and the family: an examination of religious influence in the family over the life course (1991)

Darren E. Sherkat (born December 31, 1965) is an American sociologist and professor in the department of sociology at Southern Illinois University Carbondale (SIU Carbondale).

== Education ==
Sherkat received his B.A. in sociology in 1987 from the University of Tulsa, and his M.A. and Ph.D. from Duke University in 1989 and 1991, respectively.

== Career ==
In 1991, Sherkat joined the faculty of Vanderbilt University as an assistant professor of sociology. He became an associate professor there in 1996 and remained one until leaving Vanderbilt for SIU Carbondale in 2001, where he again became an associate professor of sociology. From 2002 to 2005, he was the director of graduate studies in SIU Carbondale's sociology department, and in 2004, he became a full professor there.

== Research ==
In the field of sociology, Sherkat is known for studying religion-related topics, as well as those pertaining to family and politics. Specific topics pertaining to religion he has studies include the unaffiliated, the factors that lead to churches being either successful or unsuccessful, the popularity of classical music among Baby Boomers, and the role of religion in influence students' choice of which college to attend.

== Personal life ==
Sherkat is an avowed atheist.
