= Celebrate Recovery =

Christian behaviour modification program

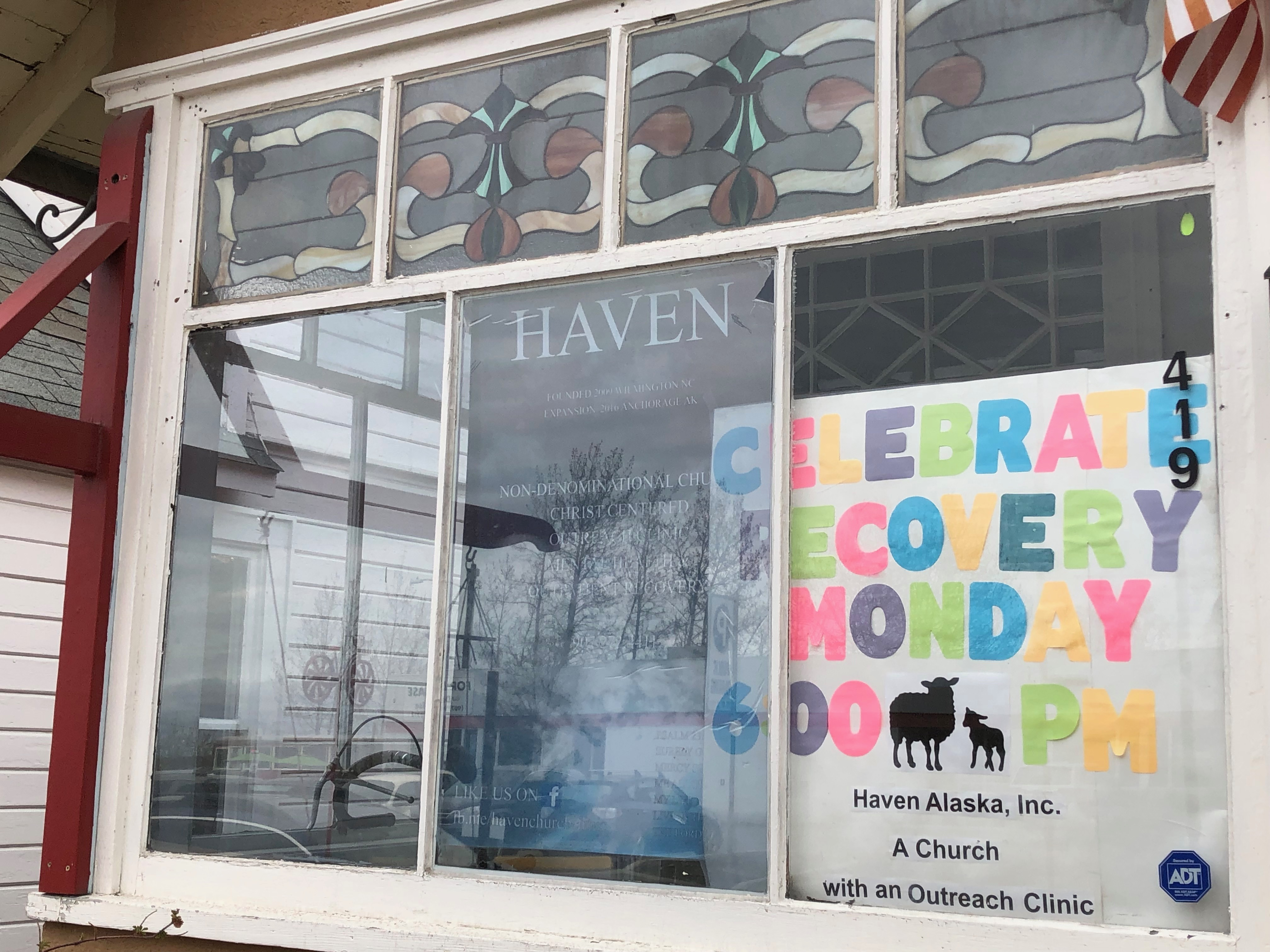
- A now-defunct recovery-oriented church in downtown Anchorage, Alaska, advertises its Celebrate Recovery meeting in May 2019.
- Founded: 1991
- Founder: John Baker
- Location: Lake Forest, California, United States
- Region served: 10 countries
- Key people: Johnny Baker
- Website: celebraterecovery.com

Celebrate Recovery is an American Christian twelve-step program designed to facilitate recovery from a wide variety of troubling behavior patterns. The global headquarters is in Lake Forest, California, United States.

== History ==
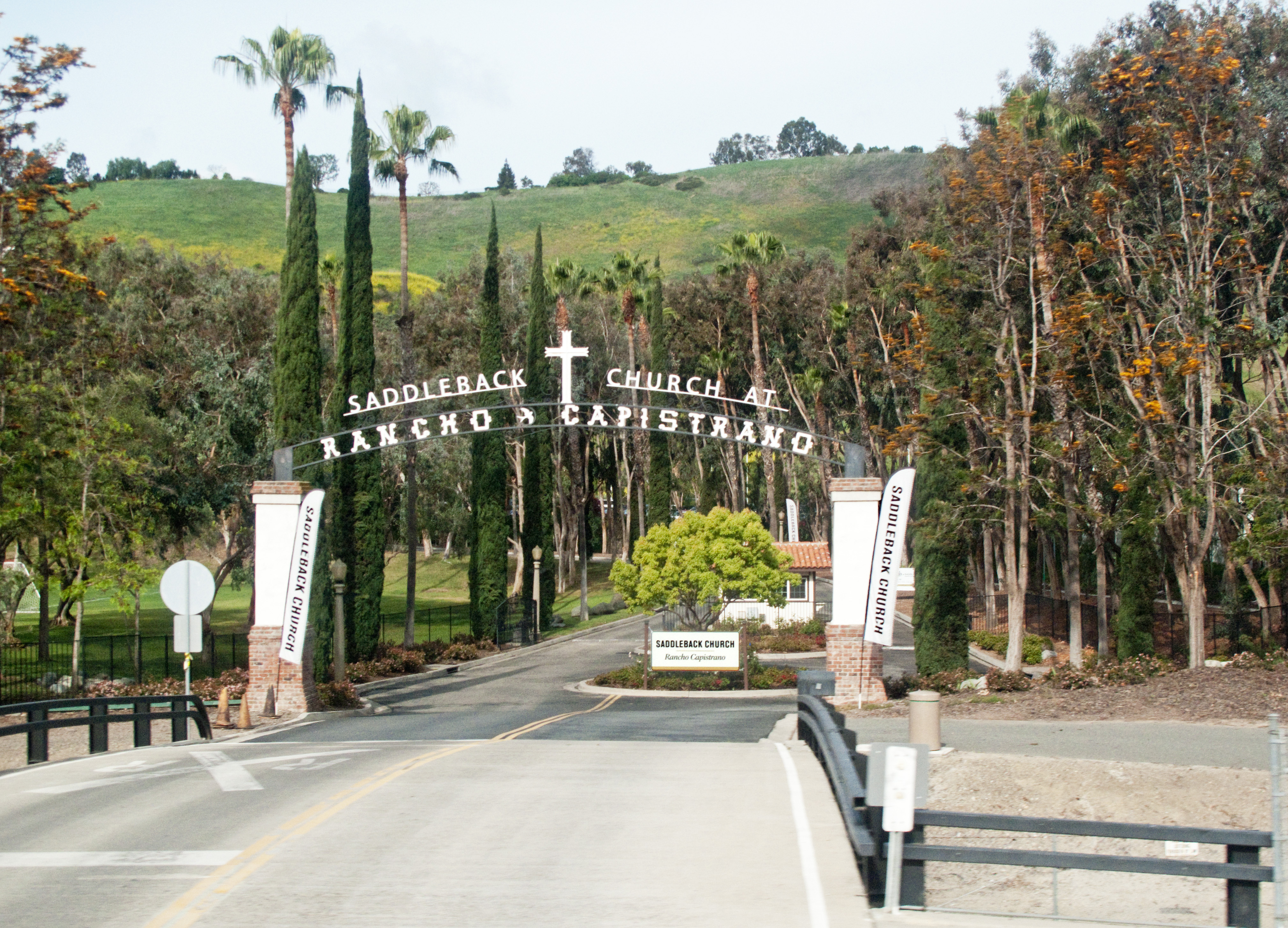
Driveway to Saddleback Church, Rancho Capistrano

The organization was founded in 1991 by John Baker, a former alcoholic staff member of Saddleback Church with the support of Pastor Rick Warren. John Baker served as the primary author of The Celebrate Recovery curriculum and materials. In 2004, the program was approved by the California Department of Corrections and entered prisons. In 2020, the organization was present in 10 countries around the world.

== Programs ==
Celebrate Recovery is a recovery program aimed at all "hurts, habits, and hang-ups", including but not exclusive to: high anxiety; co-dependency; compulsive behaviors; sex addiction; financial dysfunction; drug and alcohol addictions; and eating disorders. Celebrate Recovery is one of the seven largest addiction recovery support group programs. Promotional materials assert that over 5 million people have participated in a Celebrate Recovery step study in over 35,000 churches. Leaders seek to normalize substance abuse as similar to other personal problems common to all people.

== Methods ==
Celebrate Recovery uses both the 12 steps developed by Alcoholics Anonymous and a very similar set of eight sequential principles that are understood as a lesson of Jesus' Beatitudes. In addition to issue non-specific large group gatherings and individual mentoring, Celebrate Recovery encourages participants to form a small group of "accountability partners" who all have the same problem and support one another closely. Celebrate Recovery groups are held under the management of local church organizations. A study of Celebrate Recovery participants published in 2011 by the Journal of Religion and Health, found that levels of spirituality were associated with greater confidence to resist substance use. Celebrate Recovery has not been significantly studied, so there is no empirical evidence regarding the impacts or efficacy of the Celebrate Recovery program.

== Program fidelity constraints ==
The name Celebrate Recovery is a registered trademark of John Baker, and the national Celebrate Recovery organization requires that groups using this name hold closely to a standardized format. They may not use resources outside of the Bible and authorized Celebrate Recovery curriculum materials. Group facilitators must be trained and agree to a list of expectations, including standardized guidelines at each meeting.

== See also ==
- Addiction recovery groups
- List of twelve-step groups
- Recovery model
- Self-help groups for mental health
