= Racists Anonymous =

Support group

Racists Anonymous is a support group founded in 2015, based on the Alcoholics Anonymous model. The group was created by Sunnyvale, California United Church of Christ pastor Ron Buford over his frustration with typical attempts to deal with race issues, which merely either left him feeling angry or white participants leaving feeling guilty. The first meeting was held in 2015 following various police shootings and the Charleston church shooting. As of September 2017, 90 congregations in four countries have requested the program's kit, and several have established their own programs independently.

A basic dictum of the organization is that all people are racist to varying degrees, and that it is impossible not to be racist if raised in American culture, and that one can engage in self-improvement, as opposed to "fixing" oneself. Racist Anonymous applies the 12 steps of Alcoholics Anonymous with a modified Step 1: it says "I have come to admit that I am powerless over my addiction to racism in ways I am unable to recognize fully, let alone manage" ("Racists Anonymous") instead of the "We admitted we were powerless over alcohol—that our lives had become unmanageable" of AA.
