= Higher Power =

Term used in Alcoholics Anonymous and other twelve-step programs

"Higher Power" (HP) is a term used in Alcoholics Anonymous (AA) and other twelve-step programs. The same groups use the phrases "a power greater than ourselves" and "God of our understanding" synonymously. The term is intentionally vague because the program is not tied to a particular religion or spiritual tradition; members may use it to refer to any Supreme God or deity, another conception of God, or even non-supernatural things such as the twelve-step program itself.

== Definition and usage ==
In current twelve-step program usage, a higher power can be anything at all that the member believes is adequate. Reported examples include their twelve-step group, God, the Buddha, nature, consciousness, existential freedom, mathematics, and science. It is frequently stipulated that as long as a higher power is "greater" than the individual, then the only conditions are that it should also be loving and caring, and able to relieve the individual of their alcoholism.

=== Alcoholics Anonymous ===
The terms higher power and power greater than ourselves appear many times in the "Big Book". For example:

- "Came to believe that a power greater than ourselves could restore us to sanity."
- "The alcoholic at certain times has no effective mental defense against the first drink. Except in a few cases, neither he nor any other human being can provide such a defense. His defense must come from a Higher Power."
- "Follow the dictates of a Higher Power and you will presently live in a new and wonderful world, no matter what your present circumstances!"

== History ==
Sources that may have contributed to the adoption of the term in Alcoholics Anonymous (AA), the first twelve-step group, include spirituality, the King James Version of the Bible, New Thought religion, and the work of William James.

James, who wrote "The only cure for dipsomania is religiomania" in The Varieties of Religious Experience, is cited in the "Spiritual Experience" appendix of The Big Book of Alcoholics Anonymous. Varieties of Religious Experience uses the singular term "higher power" four times, and the plural "higher powers" seven times, to refer to powers beyond the self that may provide assistance.

The term has been cited as found in the King James version of the Bible, again in the plural form, in Romans 13:1: "Let every soul be subject unto the higher powers. For there is no power but of God: the powers that be are ordained of God." However, in this passage Saint Paul is referring to civil authorities such as kings and governments, rather than a spiritual power.

== Correlates of belief ==
Sociologist Darren Sherkat researched the belief of Americans in a higher power. He based his research on data from 8,000 adults polled by the Chicago-based National Opinion Research Center between 1988 and 2000. Among his findings were that 8% stated "I don't believe in a personal god, but I do believe in a higher power of some kind." This is the same figure as found by the 1999 Gallup national poll of Americans. Sherkat also found that 16% of the Jewish people surveyed agreed with the statement about a 'higher power', while 13.2% of liberal Protestants and 10.6% of Episcopalians also agreed with it.

An empirically based recovery framework likened faith in a higher power to motivation for personal growth as described by Abraham Maslow and Carl Rogers.

== Criticism ==
=== Nonreligious groups ===
The focus on a Higher Power in twelve-step programs has been subject to continued criticism from nonreligious advocacy groups, who view the concept as fundamentally religious in nature even when not referring to a specific deity or religious tradition. Secular Therapy Project founder Darrel Ray has characterised twelve-step programs as "religion disguised as treatment", and lawsuits have challenged court-mandated participation in twelve-step programs even after the formal adoption of "Higher Power" language.

=== Christian ===
Celebrate Recovery was founded by a group of Christians who criticized the higher power concept as being too vague. In their twelve-step-derived group, Jesus is the only higher power allowed.

== In popular culture ==
- The children's novel The Higher Power of Lucky, which received the Newbery Medal in 2007, is a story of a child who follows the direction of her higher power, a concept she learned from a twelve-step group.
- Rock group Boston recorded a song called "Higher Power" about drug addiction that was included on their Greatest Hits album.
- President of the United States George W. Bush's opening remarks at a conference in June 2008 included the remark: "There has to be a higher power."
- In a WWE storyline, The Undertaker claimed to follow a "higher power" which was ultimately revealed to be Vince McMahon.

== See also ==
- Addiction recovery groups
- Jim Burwell
- List of twelve-step groups
- Self-help groups for mental health
