= Secular Organizations for Sobriety =

Non-profit network of autonomous addiction recovery groups

- Logo of Secular Organizations for Sobriety (SOS)
- Abbreviation: SOS
- Formation: November 1986
- Founder: James Christopher
- Founded at: North Hollywood, California, U.S.
- Type: Non-profit; mutual aid organization
- Purpose: Secular addiction recovery through mutual support
- Fields: Addiction recovery
- Website: Archived 12 June 2025 at the Wayback Machine

Secular Organizations for Sobriety (SOS), also known as Save Our Selves, was a non-profit network of autonomous addiction recovery groups. The program stressed the need to place the highest priority on sobriety and used mutual support to assist members in achieving this goal. The Suggested Guidelines for Sobriety emphasized rational decision-making and are not religious or spiritual in nature. SOS represented an alternative to spiritually based addiction recovery programs such as Alcoholics Anonymous (AA). SOS members could also attend AA meetings, but SOS did not view spirituality or surrendering to a Higher Power as being necessary to maintain abstinence.

== History ==
James Christopher's alcoholism began when he was a teenager. He had originally sought help in Alcoholics Anonymous (AA), but was uncomfortable with the emphasis on God and religion and he began looking for direction in the writings of secular humanists. Christopher wrote about his frustrations with AA and his own developing program for recovery. In 1985, Free Inquiry published an article "Sobriety Without Superstition" written by Christopher. He received hundreds of letters in response and decided to organize secular, self-help, alcoholism recovery group meetings. The first such meeting was held in November 1986 in North Hollywood, California,. Until March, 24th, 2020 meetings were continuously be held at the Center for Inquiry in Los Angeles. James Christopher died July 9, 2020. Christopher had been continuously sober since 1978.

=== Northern California–New York split and litigation (1990–2001) ===
By 1990, autonomous SOS groups had formed in Northern California. In January 1991 those groups incorporated as SOS West Secular Organizations for Sobriety, Inc., while a separate New York nonprofit, Secular Organizations for Sobriety, Inc. (aka SOS, Inc.), was incorporated in February of the same year. The New York nonprofit, SOS, Inc., was affiliated with the Council for Secular Humanism, which at the time was known as the Council for Democratic and Secular Humanism (CODESH). In 1994, SOS, Inc., sued SOS West alleging trademark infringement. The United States District Court for the Northern District of California found that SOS West and its predecessors had prior use of “Secular Organizations for Sobriety”/“SOS” in Northern California and enjoined SOS, Inc. from using that name and initialism in that region. Further, the judge required that if SOS, Inc. advertised or solicited donations in Northern California using the “SOS” name (including online), it had to include a clear disclaimer stating that the local SOS there is a separate group (SOS West) and clarifying that SOS West is not affiliated with CODESH. The United States Court of Appeals for the Ninth Circuit agreed with the regional ruling, but sent the case back to the trial judge to decide whether SOS, Inc.’s federal trademark on “Secular Organizations for Sobriety” should be canceled. In both the district court and on appeal, SOS West prevailed regarding its right to use “SOS” in Northern California—no court required it to change names. Nevertheless, the group chose to rebrand for clarity and future nationwide growth, adopting the LifeRing Secular Recovery name beginning in 1999.

== Processes ==
According to Anne Fletcher and Frederick Glaser, SOS recognizes both genetic and environmental contributors to addiction while leaving the “disease” label to individual members. They report that SOS holds recovery is achievable (addictive behaviors can be arrested) but not a cure—relapse remains possible—and that SOS does not endorse sponsor/sponsee relationships.

Fletcher and Glaser also characterize the SOS program as grounded in its “Suggested Guidelines for Sobriety,” which emphasize a “sobriety priority” (placing abstinence ahead of other concerns). They describe a daily three-part focus—acknowledgment of addiction, acceptance of it, and prioritizing continued sobriety—and note that members are encouraged to adopt personal strategies or aphorisms that support abstinence.

=== Suggested Guidelines for Sobriety ===
These guidelines are suggested by SOS for maintaining sobriety.

- To break the cycle of denial and achieve sobriety, we first acknowledge that we are alcoholics or addicts.
- We reaffirm this daily and accept without reservation the fact that as clean and sober individuals, we can not and do not drink or use, no matter what.
- Since drinking or using is not an option for us, we take whatever steps are necessary to continue our Sobriety Priority lifelong.
- A quality of life, "the good life," can be achieved. However, life is also filled with uncertainties. Therefore, we do not drink or use regardless of feelings, circumstances, or conflicts.
- We share in confidence with each other our thoughts and feelings as sober, clean individuals.
- Sobriety is our Priority, and we are each responsible for our lives and sobriety.

=== Meetings ===
While each SOS meeting is autonomous, SOS does provide a meeting format. The opening reading for meeting conveners summarizes their program. Following the reading of the opening, typically there are announcements, acknowledgment of members sobriety anniversaries and a reading of the Suggested Guidelines. The suggested opening reads as follows.

Welcome to SOS. My name is [leader states his or her first name here] and I have been asked to lead tonight's meeting. Secular Organizations for Sobriety (or Save Our Selves) is dedicated to providing a path to sobriety, an alternative to those paths depending upon supernatural or religious beliefs. We respect diversity, welcome healthy skepticism, and encourage rational thinking as well as the expression of feelings. We each take responsibility for our individual sobriety on a daily basis. This is a sobriety meeting. Our focus is on the priority of abstaining from alcohol and other mind-altering drugs. We respect the anonymity of each person in this room. This is a self-help, nonprofessional group. At this meeting, we share our experiences, understandings, thoughts, and feelings.

== Demographics ==
A preliminary survey of SOS members was conducted in 1996. The survey results showed SOS attracted members with secular attitudes; 70% had no current religious affiliation and 70% were self-described atheists or agnostics, while another 22% described themselves as spiritual but non-churchgoers. SOS members were predominantly white (99%) employed (nearly half were employed full-time) males (1/4 of the respondents were female) over the age of 40. Abstinence was the reported goal of 86% of SOS members; 70% of respondents reported that they were currently abstinent (for an average of 6.3 years), another 16% were "mostly abstinent." The majority of SOS members planned long-term affiliation with SOS. Nearly every member surveyed had been exposed to AA, the average rate of AA attendance amongst SOS members in the previous month was 4.5 meetings. A 2007 survey of addiction recovery groups found that religiosity correlated negatively with participation in SOS.

== See also ==
- Drug addiction recovery groups

== Literature ==
- Christopher, James (1988). How to stay sober: recovery without religion. Buffalo, NY: Prometheus Books. ISBN 0-87975-438-9. OCLC 17385031.
- Christopher, James (1992). SOS sobriety: the proven alternative to 12-step programs. Buffalo, NY: Prometheus Books. ISBN 0-87975-726-4. OCLC 25411883.
- Christopher, James (1989). Unhooked: staying sober and drug-free. Buffalo, NY: Prometheus Books. ISBN 0-87975-542-3. OCLC 20171952.
