= Co-Dependents Anonymous =

Support group

- Abbreviation: CoDA
- Formation: October 22, 1986; 39 years ago
- Type: Twelve-step program; mutual aid group
- Purpose: Support for people who share a common desire to develop functional and healthy relationships
- Headquarters: Phoenix, Arizona, United States
- Region served: Worldwide
- Services: Peer support meetings (in-person and online)
- Website: coda.org

Co-Dependents Anonymous (CoDA) is a twelve-step program for people who share a common desire to develop functional and healthy relationships.

The first CoDA meeting occurred on October 22, 1986, in Phoenix, Arizona; 30 people participated. Within four weeks, CoDA meetings had attracted 100 participants. By the end of 1986, there were 120 CoDA groups. CoDA held its first National Service Conference the next year with 29 representatives from seven states.

As of 2026, CoDA's meeting directory lists more than 1,000 meetings in the United States, as well as meetings in many other countries. CoDA World Service reports that meetings exist in over 70 countries worldwide. CoDA also maintains directories for online and phone meetings.

CoDA avoids rigidly defining codependence, and the understanding of codependence with CoDA continues to adapt over time. In 1991, Charles Whitfield published a 38-item Likert-type checklist based on the 1989 version of the CoDA pamphlet, "What is Co-Dependency?", known as the Co-Dependents Anonymous Checklist. Later research found scores from people completing the Co-Dependents Anonymous Checklist and the Spann-Fischer Codependency Scale were strongly correlated.

The checklist cited by Whitfield has subsequently developed into "The Patterns and Characteristics of Codependence". At the 2010 CoDA Service Conference (CSC), this list went from 22 items in four Patterns termed Denial, Low Self-Esteem, Compliance, and Control, to 55 items divided into the same groups with the addition of Avoidance Patterns. Examples of these patterns include: "I have difficulty identifying what I am feeling... I judge what I think, say or do harshly, as never good enough... I put aside my own interests in order to do what others want... I freely offer advice and direction to others without being asked... I use indirect or evasive communication to avoid conflict or confrontation."

== See also ==
- Alcoholism in family systems
- Adult Children of Alcoholics
- Al-Anon/Alateen
- List of twelve-step groups
