= Cocaine Anonymous =

Twelve-step program

Cocaine Anonymous Official Registered English Logo

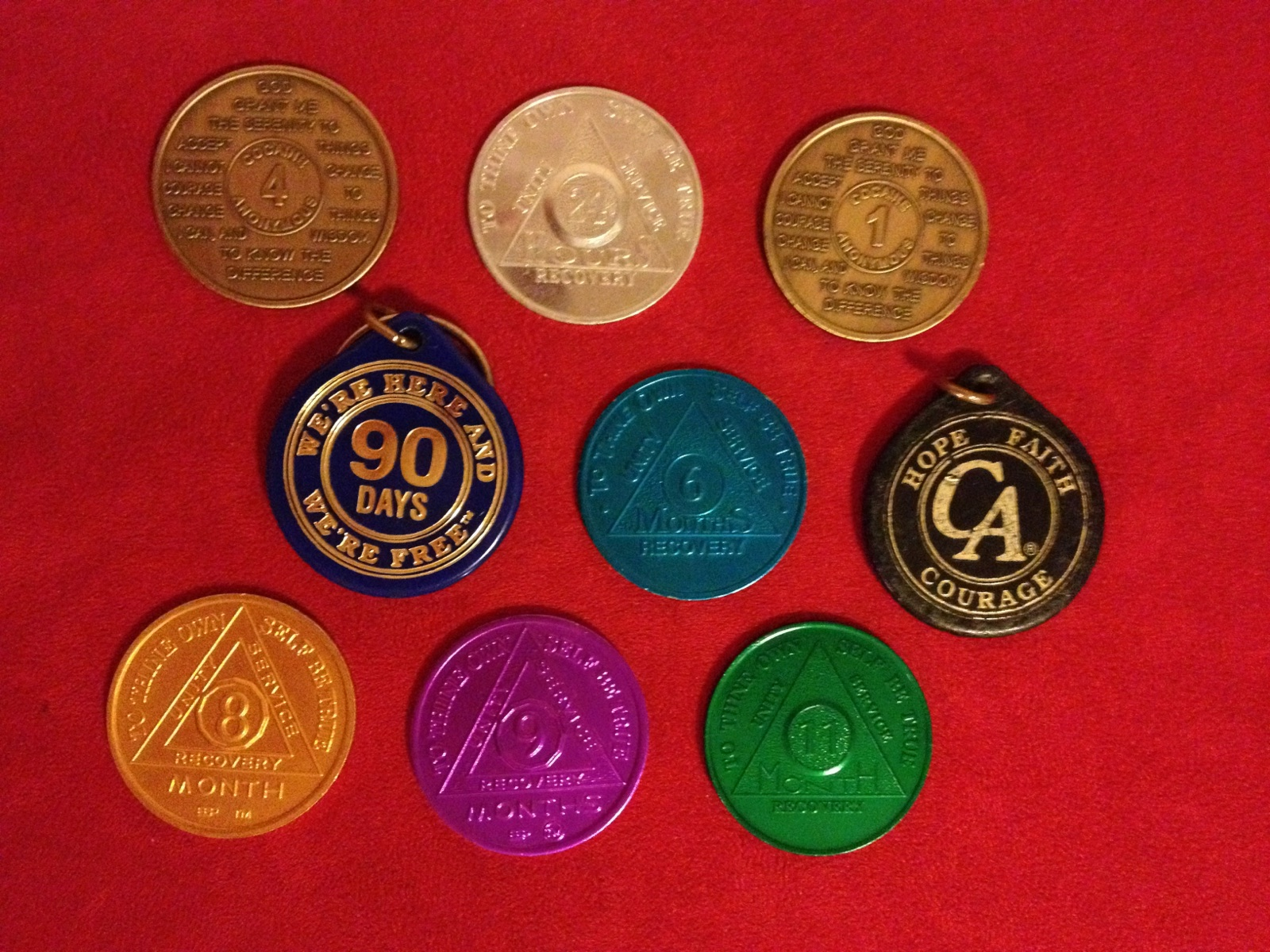
Cocaine Anonymous sobriety coins

Cocaine Anonymous (CA) is a twelve-step program formed in 1982, November 18th for people who seek recovery from drug addiction. It is patterned very closely after Alcoholics Anonymous (AA), although the two groups are unaffiliated. While many C.A. members have been addicted to cocaine, crack, speed or similar substances, C.A. accepts all who desire freedom from "cocaine and all other mind-altering substances" as members.

C.A. uses the book Alcoholics Anonymous as its basic text. Complementing this are the C.A. published works of members storybook titled Hope, Faith and Courage: Stories from the Fellowship of Cocaine Anonymous Volume I & II, A Quite Peace and The Twelve Step Companion Guide. and the AA book Twelve Steps and Twelve Traditions.

C.A. was formed in Los Angeles, California in 1982 by an anonymous member who worked in the film industry and saw a number of people who had difficulty finding help from anyone knowledgeable about the special difficulties presented by cocaine addiction. Cocaine Anonymous World Service Office, Inc. was later established in Los Angeles in 1987 and located there until July of 2024. Currently located in Phoenix, Arizona.

Co-Anon (formerly CocAnon) is a program for families of cocaine users, analogous to Al-Anon for the friends and family of alcoholics, also not associated with Cocaine Anonymous.

== See also ==
- Addiction recovery groups
- List of twelve-step groups
- History of Cocaine Anonymous
