= Marijuana Anonymous =

Twelve-step program

- MA Logo Trademark
- Nickname: MA
- Formation: 1989; 37 years ago
- Founded at: Morro Bay, CA, USA
- Type: Mutual aid addiction recovery Twelve-step program
- Headquarters: Hollywood, CA
- Members: Unknown (2026)
- Board of directors: 13 volunteer Board of Trustees
- Subsidiaries: A New Leaf Publications
- Affiliations: 27 Worldwide "Districts"
- Staff: 10 (2026)
- Volunteers: 13, Board of Trustees (2026)
- Website: marijuana-anonymous.org mawsconvention.org anewleafpublications.org
- Formerly called: Marijuana Smokers Anonymous, Marijuana Addicts Anonymous

Marijuana Anonymous (MA) founded in 1989 is an organization and twelve-step program for people with common desire to maintain abstinence from marijuana.

== History ==
Marijuana Anonymous (MA) formed in June 1989 to address compulsive use of cannabis. Since its inception, the MA fellowship has followed the Twelve Traditions and suggests practicing the Twelve Steps, both of which originated from Alcoholics Anonymous. Among the founders at the first MA conference in Morro Bay were delegates from Marijuana Smokers Anonymous (Orange County, California), Marijuana Addicts Anonymous (the San Francisco Bay area ), Marijuana Smokers Anonymous (Santa Cruz CA) and Marijuana Anonymous (Los Angeles County). Other existing fellowships from Seattle and New York City (1974), enfolded into MA later.

Marijuana Anonymous set up in London UK in 2000.

Marijuana Anonymous World Services is a non professional non-profit corporation formed to carry out the necessary business and legal affairs of Marijuana Anonymous. Trustees are the officers of MA World Services, as “trusted servants” of the members of MA. A peer facilitated support group: these are volunteer positions and no one governs, as Marijuana Anonymous follows an "inverted triangle" of service, where the members are considered most important.

Mar-anon is the program for families of marijuana addicts. This is from Brooke D., "I reached out to Marijuana Anonymous. Is there a group for loved ones? Are there meetings? They’d only heard of a group of women in California many years prior around 1993 that started a meeting and it died on the vine. However Marijuana Anonymous did create a logo and said “Here you go, maybe you can use it. Oh, and here is another person who reached out that might be interested. And… I created an outreach email, took calls from hurting souls who just needed someone to listen and finally understand, ran a weekly chat meeting, set up a Google forum and co-ran a weekly email meeting. I meshed together MA and Al-Anon’s 12 steps and got them approved by Al-Anon. I attended the Marijuana Anonymous convention in Seattle that winter 2015-2016, made flyers and finally a real in-person meeting. Mar-Anon is now spreading its wings with Bart, Aubree and Tracy and helping thousands of others. The need is there. We are not alone. It is beautiful and I am full of gratitude."

== Organization ==
The only requirement for membership to Marijuana Anonymous is a desire to stop using marijuana; there are no dues or fees. As an organization, Marijuana Anonymous attempts to stay neutral and has no official stance on the legality of cannabis, per Tradition Ten which states, "Marijuana Anonymous has no opinion on outside issues; hence the MA name ought never be drawn into public controversy." It is difficult for the organization to avoid taking a stance on whether marijuana is physically addicting, as their program is intended to help recover from marijuana addiction. However, the organization maintains that its materials are not to be considered medical or scientific literature, but rather based on personal experiences of its members. There is a piece of literature, "The Doctor's Opinion on Marijuana Addiction" by Dr. Marvin Seppala, Chief Medical Officer of Hazelden Betty Ford Foundation written for members of Marijuana Anonymous.

== Meetings ==
Meetings are a vital part of the MA program. This is where fellowship members go for peer-to-peer support, for literature, and to mark and celebrate their abstinence from marijuana. There are regularly scheduled daily meetings across the globe, in many formats including: in-person, online and phone meetings. Per the 7th Tradition, all meetings are autonomous, self-supporting, free to attend, and outside contributions are not accepted.

== Literature ==
=== Life With Hope ===
The full title is Life With Hope: A Return to Living Through the Twelve Steps and Twelve Traditions of Marijuana Anonymous. The book is available for purchase, and is free on the Marijuana Anonymous app.

=== A New Leaf ===
A New Leaf is a monthly newsletter published by Marijuana Anonymous. It contains stories and sobriety anniversaries of MA members along with the occasional article from the board members.

=== Pamphlets ===
Like most twelve step programs, MA also has informative pamphlet literature which it gives away for free. Pamphlets topics range from Why Marijuana Anonymous, Detoxing From Marijuana, Working the Program, etc.
