= List of self-help organizations =

This is a list of self-help organizations.

== Twelve-step programs ==
Recovery programs using Alcoholics Anonymous' twelve steps and twelve traditions either in their original form or by changing only the alcohol-specific references:

- Alcoholics Anonymous (AA)
- Emotions Anonymous (EA)
- Marijuana Anonymous
- Sexaholics Anonymous (SA)
- Overeaters Anonymous (OA)
- Food Addicts in Recovery Anonymous (FA)
- GROW

== Non-Twelve-step recovery programs ==
- LifeRing Secular Recovery
- Rational Recovery
- Narconon
- Recovery International (formerly Recovery, Inc.)
- Depression and Bipolar Support Alliance - DBSA
- Parents Anonymous
- SMART Recovery
- Refuge Recovery

== Other programs (not recovery oriented) ==
- Toastmasters International
- Self-help (law)
- Self-help group (finance)

== See also ==
- Self-help
- Support group
