= Neurotics Anonymous =

Twelve-step program

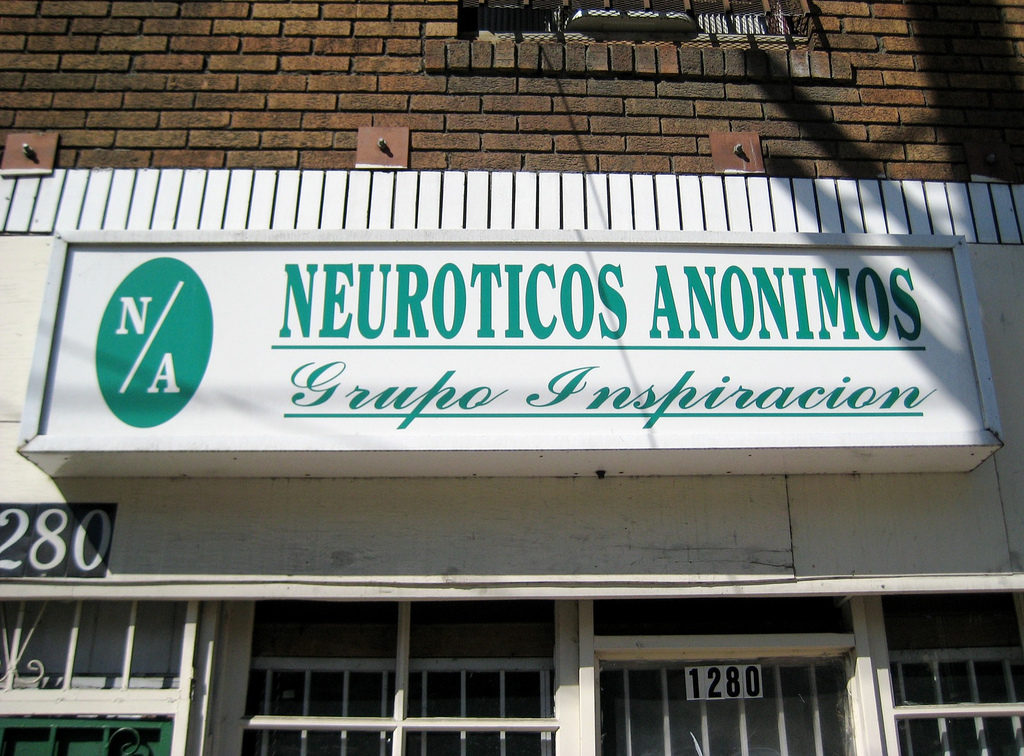
- Neurotics Anonymous office on Sunset Boulevard, between Echo Park and Downtown Los Angeles
- Founded: 1964
- Type: Twelve-step program
- Region served: Argentina, Brazil, Mexico, Nicaragua, Portugal, United States
- Website: www.neuroticosanonimos.us

Neurotics Anonymous (N/A), founded in 1964, is a twelve-step program for recovery from mental and emotional illness. To avoid confusion with Narcotics Anonymous (NA), Neurotics Anonymous is abbreviated N/A or NAIL.

== History ==
The conception of Neurotics Anonymous began with Alcoholics Anonymous (AA) co-founder Bill W. After achieving sobriety Bill continued to suffer from neurosis, specifically depression. In letters to other AA members he wrote about his personal experience with neurosis, its prevalence in AA, and how he and others learned to cope with it. Bill expressed that as he learned to let go of his dependence on people and situations for emotional security and replaced that dependence with "showing outgoing love as best as he could," his depression began to subside. In correspondence with another AA member about neurosis and psychoanalyst Karen Horney Bill suggested how a Neurotics Anonymous fellowship might operate.

You interest me very much when you talk of Karen Horney. I have the highest admiration of her. That gal's insights have been most helpful to me. Also for the benefit of screwballs like ourselves, it may be that someday we shall devise some common denominator of psychiatry — of course, throwing away their much abused terminology — common denominators which neurotics could use on each other. The idea would be to extend the moral inventory of AA to a deeper level, making it an inventory of psychic damages, reliving in conversation episodes, etc. I suppose someday a Neurotics Anonymous will be formed and will actually do all this.

— Bill W., Letter to Ollie in California, January 4, 1956.

In a subsequent letter to Ollie in June 1956, Bill suggested the inventory of psychic damages include inferiority, shame, guilt and anger. He added that the effectiveness of the inventory would come from reliving the experiences and sharing them with other people.

Neurotics Anonymous was created eight years later, February 3, 1964 in Washington, D.C. by Grover Boydston (August 16, 1924 – December 17, 1996). Grover was an AA member, recovering alcoholic, psychologist, and Ed.M. Grover had attempted suicide five times before the age of 21 and, like Bill W., was neurotic. Grover believed members of twelve-step programs shared the same underlying neuroses caused by self-centeredness, a view expressed in other twelve-step programs. Grover went as far as to say, "All of us are, indeed, brothers, and the variations in detail are no more than if one of us likes chocolate ice cream, and the other likes vanilla."

While in AA, Grover discovered working the Twelve Steps helped remove the neuroses underlying his alcoholism. As an experiment Grover instructed a woman who suffered from neurosis, but not alcoholism, to work the Twelve Steps. He discovered that they aided her recovery from neurosis as well. He wrote Alcoholics Anonymous World Services for permission to use their Twelve Steps with the word "alcohol" in the First Step replaced with "our emotions." Permission was granted. Grover placed an ad in a Washington, D.C. newspaper for Neurotics Anonymous, and organized the first meeting from those who responded to it. N/A grew modestly until an article was published on it in Parade magazine. The Associated Press and United Press International republished the story, and N/A groups began forming internationally.

By 1974 the Diagnostic and Statistical Manual of Mental Disorders, at the time in second edition (DSM-II), was undergoing revision. The framework developed for the third edition (DSM-III) was no longer based on psychoanalytic principles such as neurosis. The connotation of neurosis in common language also began to change. "Neurosis" was being used, increasingly, in a facetious or pejorative sense, rather than a diagnostic sense. These combined factors could make it difficult to take an organization known as Neurotics Anonymous seriously. In current Neurotics Anonymous literature, there is not a scientific definition ascribed to neurosis. As used in N/A, a neurotic is defined as any person who accepts that he or she has emotional problems.

== Demographics ==
Grover Boydston conducted the first demographic study of Neurotics Anonymous in 1974. Such studies are rare and samples sizes are usually small as any group following the Twelve Traditions is required to protect the anonymity of their members. While researching such groups is still ethically possible, it is more difficult given this constraint.

- Age: Boydston's study found the average age of N/A members surveyed to be 43.02 years. A study six years later of self-help groups for people with serious mental illness, found the average age to be 35.3 years.
- Attendance and Tenure: Of the N/A members surveyed Boydston found they attended, on average, six meetings per month and had spent an average of 2.37 years in N/A. N/A had existed for approximately ten years at the time of the survey.
- Employment and socioeconomic status: Boydston categorized the occupations of N/A members into four categories.

1. Professionals – Includes people who practice a profession that is so considered by scientific, academic, business, and other people. It includes physicians, lawyers, engineers, nurses, college and university instructors. These represented 38% of the members surveyed.
2. Clerical persons – Includes people who perform office work or sales work according to the classification of "clerical." These represented 32% of the members surveyed.
3. Homemakers – A person who takes care of a home as his or her main work. These represented 16% of the members surveyed.
4. Other – Includes students and people who do not fit into the three previous categories. These represented 32% of the members surveyed.
According to Boydston's results at least 70% of N/A members were employed. This is similar to a specific study of Emotions Anonymous that found most of the members were middle class. Other studies of self-help groups for people with serious mental illness found most of the members tend to be unemployed, while others found members to be predominantly working class.

- Ethnicity: Boydston's study, and all similar studies in the literature have found that the majority of members in N/A and other self-help groups for people with serious mental illness in the United States are white.
- Hospitalization: Boydston's study of N/A members found that 42% percent had been hospitalized for psychiatric reasons. More recent studies have shown that in self-help groups for serious mental illness approximately 60% (55–75%) of members had been hospitalized for psychiatric reasons.
- Marital Status: In Boydston's study of N/A members he found 25% were single, 48% were currently married, 22% were divorced and 5% were widowed. This finding has not been replicated in studies of similar groups where it was found most members had never been married.
- Religion: Boydston's survey included not only religious affiliation, but also included a measure of religiosity. Of the N/A members surveyed he found 24% identified as Catholic, 47% identified as Protestant, 9% identified as Jewish, and 19% did not consider themselves religious. Additionally, only 19% of members identified themselves as "very religious", 42% identified themselves as moderately religious, and 39% identified themselves as "not very religious".
- Specific disorders (neuroses): Boydston's survey contained an open-ended question asking about the "main complaints" N/A members came to the program with. He summarized them in a list of twelve. Listed below are his results, in order from the highest to lowest percentage of members reporting them. Members often presented with more than one complaint.

1. Depression (58%)
2. Anxiety (32%)
3. Fears (23%)
4. Problems in relationships (18%)
5. Psychosomatic pains (14%)
6. Confusion (13%)

7. No desire to live (11%)
8. Inability to cope (9%)
9. Nervousness (7%)
10. Loneliness (6%)
11. Feelings of hopelessness (5%)
12. Hate (3%)

- Sex: Boydston's study of N/A members found approximately 36% were male, and 64% were female. This ratio, of two (or more) females for every male, has been reproduced in all other studies of self-help groups for persons with serious mental illness, as well as specific studies of Emotions Anonymous groups.

=== Previous treatments ===
The tables below are the percentages of members who received the listed treatments before joining N/A. The data is taken from Boydston's 1974 study of N/A members. The treatments mentioned in this table represent those that were available in 1974 and earlier.

Psychotherapies

Psychotherapy	Members utilizing (%)
Psychiatrists	70
Psychologists	35
General practitioners (M.D.)	58
Clergy	50
Group therapy	41
Individual Therapy	22
Other nonphysical therapy (self-help groups such as AA, NA)	8

Drugs taken

Drug	Members utilizing (%)
Tranquilizers	72
Anti-depressants	53
Sleeping pills	43
Other drugs (including alcohol)	25

Somatic therapies

Therapy	Members utilizing (%)
Hospitalized	42
Electroshock treatments	27

=== Mexico City ===
Logo of the Goodwill 24 Hour Movement of Neurotics Anonymous in Mexico

In 1988 the World Health Organization estimated that 89 percent of Mexico City's population was in a crisis they described as "psychological and very severely emotional". It is estimated that 15% of the workforce in Mexico City are alcoholics. In Mexico City, alcoholism is ten times more prevalent in men than in women (the disparity increases in rural areas) and Alcoholics Anonymous groups are predominantly male. The Mexican government funds a hot line staffed by volunteers from N/A to counsel people in crisis by phone.

Neurotics Anonymous (Neuróticos Anónimos) groups in Mexico, like the groups in the United States, are predominantly female. The connotation of the word "neurotic", however, is different. Anyone who openly expresses anger is considered neurotic. For example, a wife who frequently scolds her husband or children is neurotic and can be treated in N/A. While men can be neurotic it is considered to be mostly a female affliction, usually developed in response to male alcoholic behavior. Al-Anon groups in Mexico City are also predominantly female, but many women attend N/A to deal with their husband's alcoholism.

A study of Neurotics Anonymous members in the Xochimilco borough of the Mexican Federal District found members presented with a heterogeneous composition of problems and disorders (including depression, suicidal ideation, obsessions, anxiety, sexual problems and somatic disorders). Most members were between 20 and 40 years old (73%) and were predominantly female (87%); coinciding with established social roles in the culture that men are alcoholics and women suffer from depression and other emotional problems. All members in the sample had average or below average levels of income. While members worked on average 2.5 hours per day and 87% were satisfied with the amount of time spent working per day (as it allowed them more time to participate in the group) 87% were also dissatisfied with their economic security.

== Criticism ==
For more details on this topic, see Self-help groups for mental health: Criticism

N/A members in Comalapa (a municipality in Nicaragua) believe X-ray images (radiografías) can serve as a moral diagnostic revealing information about the intent and mores of those being examined. There is, however, no evidence that they are deliberately attempting to mislead other members. Americans had similar misunderstandings of X-ray technology when it was first introduced in the United States.

=== Increasing deviant stigma ===
Sociologist Edward Sagarin noted that alcoholics and addicts are considered deviants because their behavior, chronic substance abuse, is socially labeled as deviant, while being sober or "clean" is normal. For an alcoholic or addict, joining groups such as AA or NA immediately reduces their deviant stigma, regardless of whether or not the alcoholic or addict believes it does. There is no similar clear-cut language to label the deviance of those in N/A; in the act of joining, members label themselves as deviant and take on stigma by identifying as one of those in the group afflicted with the problems of the other members. Initially joining the group may prove to be more ego damaging than ego reinforcing, regardless of whether or not the group helps them overcome their problems. Therefore, social stigma would attract alcoholics and addicts to groups like AA and NA. It would, however, become a barrier preventing people from joining groups such as N/A.

In contrast, those with severe mental illness may have acquired stigma through professional labels and diagnoses as well as through other behaviors associated with their mental illness defined as deviant. This stigma may not be as easily understood as alcoholism or addiction because the behavior is more varied and can not be explained by substance use.

The objective of NA and AA is not just to help their members stop abusing drugs and alcohol. It is acknowledged in these programs that addiction is more systemic than a "bad habit" and is fundamentally caused by self-centeredness. Long term membership in Alcoholics Anonymous has been found to reform pathological narcissism, and those who are sober but retain characteristics of personality disorders associated with addiction are known in AA as "dry drunks."

== Effectiveness ==
Neurotics Anonymous developed the Test of Mental and Emotional Health as a tool to help members evaluate their progress. It is a fifty question test, with each answer rated on a three level Likert scale. Possible scores range from zero to one hundred. Higher scores are thought to indicate better mental and emotional health.

In Boydston's survey of N/A members, when asked if they had received help through the program, 100% of those surveyed said "yes." Boydston claimed N/A had similar results to AA in terms of recovery — 50% with a desire to stop drinking do so, 25% recover after one or more relapses, but most of the other 25% never successfully recover.

== Literature ==
From 1965 to 1980 Neurotics Anonymous published a mimeographed quarterly periodical, the Journal of Mental Health (ISSN 0022-2658). This should not be confused with the newer journal of the same name that began publishing in 1992 (ISSN 1360-0567). Early in the development of N/A they used Alcoholics Anonymous (the so-called Big Book) and the Twelve Steps and Twelve Traditions, the two fundamental books of the Alcoholics Anonymous program. While reading out loud at meetings, members changed instances of the word "alcoholic" to "neurotic." Passages in the book referring specifically to drinking were ignored. Eventually, N/A began creating books from articles published in the Journal of Mental Health. There were three such books published in English.

- Neurotics Anonymous (1968). Neurotics Anonymous. Washington, D.C.: Neurotics Anonymous International Liaison, Inc.
- Neurotics Anonymous (1970). The Laws of Mental and Emotional Illness. Washington, D.C.: Neurotics Anonymous International Liaison, Inc. ASIN B000FTOFYS. LCCN 76102220. OCLC 104842.
- Neurotics Anonymous (1978). The Etiology of Mental and Emotional Illness and Health. Washington, D.C.: Neurotics Anonymous International Liaison, Inc. ASIN B000FTON22. LCCN 76040759. OCLC 4500175.

The N/A organizations in Brazil and Mexico use translations of the English literature as well as literature written by groups in their area.

== Parallel organization ==
A registered charity, known as Neurotics Anonymous and located in London, was created in the late 1960s by John Oliver Yates. Yates was prompted to create the groups after trauma he had suffered from a car accident that left him completely blind. Group membership was open to anyone, although it was recommended for people who had a nervous illness severe enough to require hospitalization. This charity differed from conventional twelve-step programs in several ways. There was a nominal fee charged for membership. Meetings opened with a discussion of outside issues, such debate on social, political or cultural topics. The debate was followed by a personal problem forum where members brought their problems to Yates for initial comment followed by a presentation for group discussion.

== See also ==
- Emotions Anonymous
- GROW
- List of twelve-step groups
- Recovery International (formerly Recovery, Inc.)
- Self-help groups for mental health
- Recovery model
