= Abraham Low Self-Help Systems =

Non-profit organization based in Chicago

- Type: Board-only
- Location: Chicago, Illinois
- Key people: Executive Director: Nancy Carstedt; President: Celinda Jungheim
- Subsidiaries: Recovery International, Power to Change
- Endowment: < One million dollars
- Employees: < 10

Abraham Low Self-Help Systems (ALSHS) is a non-profit organization formed from the merger of Recovery International and the Abraham Low Institute. ALSHS facilitates the estimated 600 worldwide Recovery International meetings and all projects formerly run by the Abraham Low Institute including the Power to Change program. The organization is named after Abraham Low, founder of the mental health self-help organization now known as Recovery International.

== History ==
Recovery, Inc., often referred to simply as Recovery, was officially formed November 7, 1937, by neuropsychiatrist Abraham Low in Chicago, Illinois. Low created the organization to facilitate peer support self-help groups for former mental patients and later allowed for participation of those who had not been hospitalized, but with a desire to improve their mental health. During the organization's annual meeting in June 2007 it was announced that Recovery, Inc. would thereafter be known as Recovery International. As of 2008 there were over 600 weekly Recovery International meetings held throughout North America, Ireland, the United Kingdom, Israel and India.

The Abraham Low Institute was founded in 1989 to develop programs, in addition to Recovery, based on Low's self-help principles. The Institute awarded grants to further scholarly research on Low's work, provided research resources for people interested in Low's methods, and developed the Power to Change program and The Relatives Project.

On January 1, 2008 Recovery International merged with The Abraham Low Institute and provisionally renamed the new organization Recovery International / The Abraham Low Institute (RI/TALI). Celinda Jungheim, a community volunteer from Los Angeles, was elected as president of the Board of Directors. Abraham Low Self-Help Systems was incorporated on January 1, 2009, completing the merger of Recovery International and The Abraham Low Institute. Abraham Low Self-Help Systems is now the provider of Recovery International community, phone and online meetings and The Power to Change program, which was a program of The Abraham Low Institute.

== The Relatives Project ==
The Relatives Project, found in 1993, provides support for family and friends of people who have mental and emotional problems. The Relatives Project teaches coping skills and stress management through meetings similar to those held in Recovery International groups, but using literature written by Abraham Low specifically for the families of his patients. Relatives are taught to maintain empathy and unconditional positive regard for their ill relative, while reframing their domestic environment to provide an empowering atmosphere for all members. The Relatives Project groups are open to adults and teenagers, and allow professionals to observe but only to participate if it is in support of a family member's mental health. Mental health becomes a shared goal for a family, and all family members share in responsibility to achieve it.

== Power to Change ==
Power to Change is a cognitive-behavioral peer-to-peer program based on Low's self-help principles. Power to Change primarily teaches at-risk students and ex-prisoners principles of Low's Self-Help system in peer-to-peer groups. Power to Change groups generally consist of 8-12 members, meeting weekly, who learn the principles of the Low Self-Help System by describing their personal experience of disturbing events and commenting on each other's experiences using a highly structured format.

Specifically, Power to Change consists of five components:

1. a peer-to-peer process intended to provide a safe environment for members to disclose their experiences to a supportive group,
2. a meeting structure intended to keep discussion on topic,
3. a four-part format to help members frame their experiences as useful examples, and
4. group feedback utilizing a set of tools (principles of Abraham Low's therapeutic technique).

The four-part example consists of an objective description an event; a report of the feelings, sensations, thoughts, and impulses experienced in the members mind and body; how the member used the Power to Change tools to manage the experience; and a self-endorsement to remind the member of the progress made and to reward their effort. The Power to Change groups use much of the language suggested in the Recovery International program, such as identifying "temper" and avoiding judgment of right and wrong.

The W. K. Kellogg Foundation has provided grants for Power to Change since 2003. The most recent grant was awarded in November 2008, and will provide funding until November 2010.

=== Chicago Public Schools ===
In 2007 Urban Networks Associates (UNA) conducted an evaluation of Power to Change as it was implemented in seventeen secondary and middle schools in the Chicago Public School system. In each school 12-24 group sessions were held and facilitated by either staff from the Abraham Low Institute or by a local facilitator trained by the Abraham Low Institute. Participating students showed significant improvement in prosocial behavior as measured by pre-testing and post-testing of emotional intelligence, specifically increasing self-restraint and decreasing violent behaviors. Although statistically significant, the effect sizes of changes were low or medium.

UNA's SEM evaluation of the Power to Change logic model, the required steps and conditions for the program to be effective, found it fit the data collected well. To improve the effectiveness of the program UNA recommended improving communication with and training of local facilitators, encouraging students to develop plans to apply program tools outside of the group, updating the literature used to make it more age appropriate for the young students, adding activities to encourage confidentiality of what was said in group meetings and developing more interactive activities to teach program concepts. UNA also suggested asking for a commitment from participating schools to guarantee facilities were always available and that students would not be prohibited from attending group sessions.

== See also ==
- Psychiatric survivors movement
- Recovery International
- Self-help groups for mental health
