= Emotions Anonymous =

Twelve-step program

- Founded: 1971
- Location: St. Paul, Minnesota
- Region served: 30 countries throughout the world and the United States.
- Website: emotionsanonymous.org

Emotions Anonymous (EA) is a twelve-step program for recovery from mental and emotional illness, modeled after Alcoholics Anonymous (AA). Founded in 1971, it is a self-help organization that offers peer support to people experiencing a wide range of emotional and mental health challenges, including depression, anxiety, grief, anger, and relationship problems. The program follows the same Twelve Steps and Twelve Traditions as other recovery programs, with adaptations focusing on emotional well-being rather than substance addiction.

Emotions Anonymous operates through local support groups that meet regularly across numerous countries worldwide, providing a space where members can share their experiences and work toward "emotional sobriety" in a confidential environment. The organization is self-supporting through member contributions and publishes literature to assist in the recovery process. There are approximately 300 Emotions Anonymous groups active in the United States and another 300 around the world in 30 countries.

== History ==
Marion Flesch (July 24, 1911–October 10, 2004) is responsible for creating the groups that would later become known as Emotions Anonymous. Flesch was a graduate of St. Cloud State Teachers College (now St. Cloud State University) and at various times worked as a teacher, secretary, clerk, accountant, bookkeeper and office manager. Later in life she became a certified chemical dependency counselor through the University of Minnesota and started work on a master's degree, but stopped at age 80 due to health concerns. Flesch originally went to Al-Anon meetings on the advice of a friend to help cope with panic attacks. Later she learned of another twelve-step program, Neurotics Anonymous (NA), and she started the first such meeting in Minnesota on April 13, 1966, at the Merriam Park Community Center in St. Paul. NA grew quickly in Minnesota, and by fall of 1966 there were 30 active groups in the state.

Differences developed between the Minnesota groups and the central offices of NA. The Minnesota Intergroup Association separated from NA on July 6, 1971. After unsuccessful attempts to reconcile differences with NA, the Minnesota groups later adopted the name Emotions Anonymous. They wrote to Alcoholics Anonymous World Services for permission to use the Twelve Steps and Twelve Traditions. Permissions were eventually granted and EA officially filed articles of incorporation on July 22, 1971.

== Processes ==
For more details on this topic, see Self-help groups for mental health: Group processes and Twelve-step program: Process

EA views mental and emotional illness as chronic and progressive, like addiction. EA members find they "hit bottom" when the consequences of their mental and emotional illness cause complete despair. Twelve-step groups symbolically represent human structure in three dimensions: physical, mental, and spiritual. The illnesses the groups deal with are understood to manifest themselves in each dimension.

The First Step in each twelve-step group states what members have been unable to control with their will power. In some cases, the emphasis is on the experience in the physical dimension. Thus, for instance, in AA, the First Step suggests admitting powerlessness over alcohol; in Overeaters Anonymous (OA), it is powerlessness over food. In other groups, the First Step emphasizes the experience in the mental dimension. Thus, for instance, in NA the First Step suggests admitting powerlessness over addiction; in EA (as well as NA), it is powerlessness over emotions. Emotions Anonymous focuses on deviant moods and emotions, not just a craving for mood alteration. The subjective experience of powerlessness over one's emotions can generate multiple kinds of behavioral disorders, or it can be a cause of mental suffering with no consistent behavioral manifestation (such as affective disorders).

In the Third Step, members surrender their will to a Higher Power. This should not be understood as encouraging passiveness, however. Rather, its purpose is to increase acceptance of reality. The process of working the Twelve Steps is intended to replace self-centeredness with a growing moral consciousness and a willingness for self-sacrifice and unselfish constructive action. This is known as a spiritual awakening, or religious experience.

=== Purpose ===
EA is not intended to be a replacement for psychotherapy, psychiatric medication, or any kind of professional mental health treatment. People may find EA useful as a complement to mental health treatment, as a personal means to better mental health in general, or when psychiatric treatment is not available, or if they have resistance to psychiatric treatment. EA does not attempt to coerce members into following anyone's advice.

=== Intellectual disabilities and hospitalization ===
Jim Voytilla of the Ramsey County, Minnesota, Human Services Department created EA groups for intellectually disabled substance abusers in 1979. He noted that when this particular demographic of substance abusers attended AA meetings in the surrounding community, they felt uncomfortable and made others attending the meetings uncomfortable. Voytilla's EA meetings were created to avoid these problems and address the illnesses of his clients other than substance abuse. Since then, four articles have narrowly defined EA as a program specifically for intellectually disabled substance abusers. In a similar way, EA has also been incorrectly described as an organization either specifically or primarily for those who have been discharged from psychiatric hospitals.

EA does not discriminate against any demographic. All that is needed to join EA is a desire to become emotionally well. EA is not, and never has been, a program specifically for people of any particular background or treatment history. It is not uncommon for individuals in recovery from addictions or former patients in psychiatric hospitals to seek help in EA after being discharged.

== Literature ==
Emotions Anonymous publishes three books approved for use in the organization. Emotions Anonymous is the primary book; the Today book contains 366 daily meditation readings related to the EA program; and It Works If You Work It discusses EA's tools and guidelines in detail.

- Emotions Anonymous (1996). Emotions Anonymous (Revised ed.). St. Paul, Minnesota: Emotions Anonymous International Services. ISBN 978-0-9607356-5-5. OCLC 49768287.
- Emotions Anonymous (1987). Today. St. Paul, Minnesota: Emotions Anonymous. ISBN 978-0-9607356-2-4. OCLC 19232484.
- Emotions Anonymous (2003). It Works If You Work It. St. Paul, Minnesota: Emotions Anonymous. ISBN 978-0-9607356-9-3. OCLC 54625984.

=== Tools and guidelines for recovery ===
Although twelve-step programs use the Twelve Steps and Twelve Traditions, most have their own specialized tools and guidelines emphasizing the focus of their program. EA developed the "Twelve Helpful Concepts," and "What EA Is...and Is Not," the "Just for Todays," as well as a slightly modified version of AA's Twelve Promises. The EA "Just For Todays" were adapted by a twelve-step organization for female victims of domestic violence with substance abuse histories, Wisdom of Women (WOW).

== See also ==
- GROW
- Neurotics Anonymous
- List of twelve-step groups
- Recovery International (formerly Recovery, Inc.)
- Recovery model
- Self-help groups for mental health
