= Helper theory =

Theory in psychology

Helper theory or the helper therapy principle was first described by Frank Riessman (1965) in an article published in the journal Social Work. The principle suggests that when an individual (the "helper") provides assistance to another person, the helper may benefit. Riessman's model has inspired subsequent research and practice by scholars, clinicians, and indigenous populations to address a variety of social and health-related issues plaguing individuals and communities around the world.

== Riessman's formulation ==
Riessman's seminal article explored how nonprofessionals supported one another in self-help/mutual-aid support groups based on Riessman's observations of a sample of these groups, as well as his summary of the findings of research in the areas of social work, education, and leadership. This article suggested that although the "use of people with a problem to help other people who have the same problem in [a] more severe form" is "an age-old therapeutic approach," the traditional focus on outcomes for those receiving help to the exclusion of considering outcomes for those providing help is too narrow; instead, Riessman advocated for increased consideration of the experience of "the individual that needs the help less, that is, the person who is providing the assistance" because "frequently it is he who improves!" (p. 27). Although Riessman expressed doubt that individuals receiving help always benefit from the assistance provided to them, he felt more sure that individuals providing help are likely experiencing important gains; thus, according to Riessman, the helping interaction at least has the potential to be mutually beneficial for both parties involved (i.e., for both the individual giving and for the individual receiving aid), but it is not absolutely necessary for the "helpee" to benefit in order for the "helper" to enjoy the benefits of helping. In instances where true mutual benefit occurs, the helper and helpee benefit in different ways, such that the person receiving help benefits by way of receiving whatever specific form of assistance is offered to them (e.g., emotional support, information, etc.) while the person providing help benefits by the very act of providing help, regardless of the type of aid they provide.

Riessman posited several different mechanisms which may facilitate the benefits experienced by an individual engaged in a helping role:

1. gaining an improved self-image;
2. becoming more committed to a position through the process of advocating it (i.e., "self-persuasion through persuading others");
3. experiencing meaningful development of abilities after having been given a stake in a system and learning through teaching others;
4. gaining access to a socially-valued role and the resultant sense of social status and importance;
5. enjoying opportunities to affirm one's own wellness following placement in a system as a role model; and
6. shifting one's focus from self-concerns and problems to assisting others (and thus distracting oneself from ongoing difficulties).

== Health care ==
Lepore, Buzaglo, Liberman, Golant, Greener, and Davey (2014) investigated the helper-therapy principle in a randomized control trial of a "prosocial", other-focused Internet Support Group (P-ISG) designed to elicit peer-instigated, supportive interactions online among female breast cancer survivors. When compared to female breast cancer survivors who participated in a standard, self-focused Internet Support Group (S-ISG), which was not designed to explicitly provide opportunities for helping interactions to take place, analyses found that individuals in the P-ISG condition did provide more support to others yet P-ISG participants experienced a higher level of depression and anxiety following the intervention than those in S-ISG. These results fail to provide support for the helper-therapy principle which posits that "helping others is effective at promoting mental health" (p. 4085). In accounting for these results, Lepore et al. (2014) suggest that it is possible that women in the P-ISG condition felt hesitant to express their negative feelings out of fear that doing so might impact others adversely, whereas women in the S-ISG felt more able to unburden themselves of emotional pain and thus enjoyed better mental health outcomes.

Arnold, Calhoun, Tedeschi, and Cann (2005) explored both the positive and negative sequelae of providing psychotherapy to clients who had experienced trauma and subsequent posttraumatic growth by conducting naturalistic interviews with a small sample of clinicians (N = 21). Although all interviewees indicated experiencing some degree of negative experience as a result of engaging in trauma-focused psychotherapy (such as intrusive thoughts, negative emotional responses, negative physical responses, and doubts about clinical competence), all participants also indicated some sort of positive personal outcome occurred as a result of assisting psychotherapy clients with these types of experiences. The positive reactions experienced by clinicians engaged in trauma work included: enjoying the gratification that comes through watching others grow and triumph following difficult times; increasing recognition of one's own personal growth and development; expanding ability to connect emotionally with others; impacting one's own sense of spirituality; increased awareness of one's own good fortune in life; and increasing appreciation for the strength and resiliency of human beings. This finding suggests that the helper-therapy principle may operate in a clinical context whereby therapists (i.e., the helpers) benefit from engaging in the process of providing treatment to psychotherapy clients who have survived traumatic experiences.

Pagano, Post, and Johnson (2011) reviewed recent evidence examining "helper health benefits" among populations experiencing problematic involvement with alcohol, other mental health conditions, and/or general medical problems. In brief, their review suggests that when individuals with chronic health conditions (e.g., alcohol use disorder, body dysmorphic disorder with comorbid alcohol dependence, multiple sclerosis, chronic pain) help others living with the same chronic condition, the individual helper benefits (e.g., longer time-to-relapse, remission, reduced depression and other problematic symptoms, and increased self-confidence, self-esteem, and role functioning).

Additionally, Post's (2005) review of the literature on altruism, happiness, and health indicates that "a strong correlation exists between the well-being, happiness, health, and longevity of people who are emotionally kind and compassionate in their charitable helping activities" (p. 73). However, Post also notes that individual helpers may become overwhelmed by over-involvement in the lives of others, and that giving assistance beyond a certain variable threshold may lead to deleterious rather than beneficial outcomes for helpers.

== Social work ==
Melkman, Mor-Salwo, Mangold, Zeller, & Benbenishty (2015) used a grounded theory approach to understand 1) the motivations and experiences which led young adult "careleavers" (N = 28, aged 18–26) in Israel and Germany to assume a helper role and 2) the benefits they report enjoying as a result of helping others through volunteerism and/or human-service focused careers. Participants reported that observing role models involved in helping roles, being exposed to prosocial values, and having opportunities to volunteer within the system in which they were simultaneously receiving care all contributed to later assumption of more stable and regular helping roles. These participants felt obliged to provide assistance to others, desired to provide this assistance to others, and felt sufficiently competent to carry out the tasks required of them in their helping role. These participants reported that helping others provided them with a sense of purpose in their lives, and also increased self-efficacy, social connectedness, and ability to cope with personal issues. Additionally, participants reported that assuming a helping role provided a sense of normalcy to their lives, as well as providing a sense of perspective on their own journey and outcomes. As one participant (a volunteer with a police department who was assigned to work with at-risk youth) shared with the researchers:

"The fact that I could bring a runaway girl back to her home and I made her trust me, the fact that I located a missing girl, the fact that I escorted a rape victim to hospital and I managed to give her strength and support her, these are the things that give me meaning, tell me that I'm in a much better situation than others" (p. 45).

== Self-help/mutual-help ==
Roberts, Salem, Rappaport, Toro, Luke, and Seidman (1999) found support for the helper-therapy principle among participants of GROW, a mutual-help group for individuals with serious mental illness, whereby "participants who offered help to others evidenced improvement over time in psychosocial adjustment" (p. 859).

Maton (1988) reports that occupying both "helper" and "helpee" roles in a self-help/mutual-aid group (i.e., bidirectional support) was positively correlated with psychological well-being and positive perceptions regarding the benefits of group membership, and that these members with dual-roles had a greater sense of well-being and a more favorable opinion of the group than members who were helpees (i.e., recipients of assistance) only.

Olson, Jason, Ferrari, and Hutcheson (2005) reviewed the existent literature on four mutual-help organizations (Alcoholics Anonymous, Oxford House, GROW, and Schizophrenics Anonymous). They suggest that the processes of change framework found within the transtheoretical model of intentional behavior change (Prochaska, Diclemente, and Norcross, 1992) is a useful model to conceptualize the activities of mutual-help organization members throughout their journey of mental health recovery. They explicitly link social liberation, the last of the ten processes of change articulated by the model (the others being: consciousness raising, self-reevaluation, helping relationships, self-liberation, environmental reevaluation, dramatic relief/emotional arousal, stimulus control, reinforcement management, and counterconditioning) to the helper-therapy principle, along with a related concept known as bidirectional support (Maton, 1988). Per Olson et al. (2005), social liberation "involves the person in recovery focusing attention away from oneself and developing a broader recognition of social issues that contributed to the targeted problem" which encourages "recovering individuals to take more helping-related attitudes toward others who face similar problems" (p. 174). In reviewing the research conducted among members of these four self-help/mutual-help organizations, they identify three different mechanisms which might underlie the therapeutic effect of mutual-help: (1) when an individual helps another, the helper's social functioning improves because the act of providing help to another allows the helper to work through their own difficulties; (2) when an individual helps another, the helper's social functioning improves because the act of providing help to another allows the helper to reinforce their own personal learning about recovery; and/or (3) when an individual helps another, the helper experiences an increase in their own sense of competence and usefulness to others and enables the helper to adopt a "strength-based roles that have not been fully exercised in other areas of life" (p. 175). In reviewing the research on GROW, specifically, 67% of members of this organization sampled by Young and Williams (1987) who were asked how they most benefited from participation reported that involvement in GROW "taught [them they] could help others" (the most endorsed answer among all listed categories). As suggested by a study by Maton and Salem (1995), this idea is most succinctly expressed by way of an axiom of GROW which is often recited at meetings: "If you need help, help others."

A review of empirical studies investigating the effect of mutual help group participation for individuals with mental health problems by Pistrang, Barker, and Humphreys (2008) provides "limited but promising evidence that mutual help groups benefit people with three types of problems: chronic mental illness, depression/anxiety, and bereavement" (p. 110).
