= Wellness Recovery Action Plan =

Therapeutic method and series of self-help books

Wellness Recovery Action Plan (WRAP) is a recovery model developed by a group of people in northern Vermont in 1997 in a workshop on mental health recovery led by Mary Ellen Copeland. It has been extensively studied and reviewed, and is now an evidence-based practice, listed in the SAMSHA National Registry of Evidence-Based Programs and Practices (NREPP).

WRAP focuses on a person's strengths, rather than perceived deficits. WRAP is voluntary and trauma informed. People develop their own WRAP.

== History ==
Mary Ellen Copeland's work is based on the study of the coping and wellness strategies of people who have experienced mental health challenges. She created a survey and administered it to 125 volunteers to find out what treatments worked for them.

In 2005, Copeland's work led to the creation of the non-profit, the Copeland Center for Wellness and Recovery which continues her work through trainings around the world.

== Copeland Center for Wellness and Recovery ==
The Copeland Center for Wellness and Recovery is a non-profit mental health organization that created and pioneered the use of the WRAP and other works developed by Copeland. The Center was established in 2005, and focuses their trainings and programs on persons seeking to take personal responsibility to improve their wellness. They also work with health service providers, businesses and community groups.

The Copeland Center provides training on WRAP, peer support, trauma informed care, on working with youth, and creating organizational change agents.

They have introduced their practices through the training of WRAP Facilitators all over the U.S. There are WRAP Facilitators in the United States, Canada, Japan, New Zealand, United Kingdom, the Netherlands, China, and Ireland trained by the Copeland Center or Advanced Level WRAP Facilitators trained by the Copeland Center.

Copeland helps train facilitators through the Center.

== See also ==
- Recovery approach
