= Recovery model =

Mental health focused on recovery

The recovery model, recovery approach or psychological recovery is an approach to mental disorders or substance dependence that emphasizes and supports a person's potential for recovery. Recovery is generally seen in this model as a personal journey rather than a set outcome, and one that may involve developing hope, a secure base and sense of self, supportive relationships, empowerment, social inclusion, coping skills, and meaning. Recovery sees symptoms as a continuum of the norm rather than an aberration and rejects sane-insane dichotomy.

William Anthony, director of the Boston Centre for Psychiatric Rehabilitation, developed a cornerstone definition of mental health recovery in 1993. "Recovery is a deeply personal, unique process of changing one's attitudes, values, feelings, goals, skills and/or roles. It is a way of living a satisfying, hopeful, and contributing life even with limitations caused by the illness. Recovery involves the development of new meaning and purpose in one's life as one grows beyond the catastrophic effects of mental illness."

The concept of recovery in mental health emerged as deinstitutionalization led to more individuals living in the community. It gained momentum as a social movement in response to a perceived failure by services or wider society to adequately support social inclusion, coupled with studies demonstrating that many people do recover. A recovery-oriented approach has since been explicitly adopted as the guiding principle of mental health and substance dependency policies in numerous countries and states. Practical steps have been taken to base services on a recovery model, although obstacles, concerns, and criticisms have been raised by both service providers and recipients of services. Several standardized measures have been developed to assess different aspects of recovery, although there is some divergence between professionalized models and those originating in the psychiatric survivors movement.

== History ==
In general medicine and psychiatry, recovery has long been used to refer to the end of a particular experience or episode of illness. The broader concept of "recovery" as a general philosophy and model was first popularized in regard to recovery from substance abuse and drug addiction—for example, within twelve-step programs or the California Sober method.

Mental health recovery emerged in Geel, Belgium in the 13th century. Saint Dymphna—the patron saint of mental illness—was martyred there by her father in the 7th century. The Church of Saint Dymphna, built in 1349, became a pilgrimage destination for those seeking help with their psychiatric conditions. By the late 1400s, so many pilgrims were coming to Geel that the townspeople began hosting them as guests in their homes. This tradition of community recovery continues today.

More widespread application of recovery models to psychiatric disorders is comparatively recent. The concept of recovery can be traced back as far as 1840, when John Thomas Perceval, son of Prime Minister Spencer Perceval, wrote of his personal recovery from the psychosis that he experienced from 1830 until 1832, a recovery that he obtained despite the "treatment" he received from the "lunatic" doctors who attended him. But by consensus the main impetus for the development came from within the consumer/survivor/ex-patient movement, a grassroots self-help and advocacy initiative, particularly within the United States during the late 1980s and early 1990s. The professional literature, starting with the psychiatric rehabilitation movement in particular, began to incorporate the concept from the early 1990s in the United States, followed by New Zealand and more recently across nearly all countries within the "First World". Similar approaches developed around the same time, without necessarily using the term 'recovery', in Italy, the Netherlands and the UK.

Developments were fueled by a number of long-term outcome studies of people with "major mental illnesses" in populations from virtually every continent, including landmark cross-national studies by the World Health Organization from the 1970s and 1990s, showing unexpectedly high rates of complete or partial recovery, with exact statistics varying by region and the criteria used. The cumulative impact of personal stories or testimony of recovery has also been a powerful force behind the development of recovery approaches and policies. A key issue became how service consumers could maintain the ownership and authenticity of recovery concepts while also supporting them in professional policy and practice.

Increasingly, recovery became both a subject of mental health services research and a term emblematic of many of the goals of the consumer/survivor/ex-patient movement. The concept of recovery was often defined and applied differently by consumers/survivors and professionals. Specific policy and clinical strategies were developed to implement recovery principles although key questions remained.

== Elements of recovery ==
It has been emphasized that each individual's journey to recovery is a deeply personal process, as well as being related to an individual's community and society. A number of features or signs of recovery have been proposed as often core elements and comprehensively they have been categorized under the concept of CHIME. CHIME is a mnemonic of connectedness, hope & optimism, identity, meaning & purpose and empowerment.

=== Connectedness and supportive relationships ===
A common aspect of recovery is said to be the presence of others who believe in the person's potential to recover and who stand by them. According to Relational Cultural Theory as developed by Jean Baker Miller, recovery requires mutuality and empathy in relationships. The theory states this requires relationships that embody respect, authenticity, and emotional availability. Supportive relationships can also be made safer through predictability and avoiding shaming and violence. While mental health professionals can offer a particular limited kind of relationship and help foster hope, relationships with friends, family and the community are said to often be of wider and longer-term importance. Case managers can play the role of connecting recovering persons to services to which the recovering person may have limited access, such as food stamps and medical care. Others who have experienced similar difficulties and are on a journey of recovery can also play a role in establishing community and combating a recovering person's feelings of isolation. An example of a recovery approach that fosters a sense of community to combat feelings of isolation is the safe house or transitional housing model of rehabilitation. This approach supports victims of trauma through a community-centered, transitional housing method that provides social services, healthcare, and psychological support to navigate through and past experiences. Safe houses aim to support survivors on account of their individual needs and can effectively rehabilitate those recovering from issues such as sexual violence and drug addiction without criminalization. Additionally, safe houses provide a comfortable space where survivors can be listened to and encouraged through compassion. In practice, this can be accomplished through one-on-one interviews with other recovering people, engaging in communal story circles, or participating in peer-led support groups. Those who share the same values and outlooks more generally (not just in the area of mental health) may also be particularly important. It is said that one-way relationships based on being helped can actually be devaluing and potentially re-traumatizing, and that reciprocal relationships and mutual support networks can be of more value to self-esteem and recovery.

=== Hope ===
Finding and nurturing hope has been described as a key to recovery. It is said to include not just optimism but a sustainable belief in oneself and a willingness to persevere through uncertainty and setbacks. Hope may start at a certain turning point, or emerge gradually as a small and fragile feeling, and may fluctuate with despair. It is said to involve trusting, and risking disappointment, failure and further pain.

=== Identity ===
Recovery of a durable sense of self (if it had been lost or taken away) has been proposed as an important element. A research review suggested that people sometimes achieve this by "positive withdrawal"—regulating social involvement and negotiating public space in order to only move towards others in a way that feels safe yet meaningful, while nurturing personal psychological space that allows room for developing understanding and a broad sense of self, interests, spirituality, and other concepts. It was suggested that the process is usually greatly facilitated by experiences of interpersonal acceptance, mutuality, and a sense of social belonging, and is often challenging in the face of the typical barrage of overt and covert negative messages that come from the broader social context. Being able to move on can mean having to cope with feelings of loss, which may include despair and anger. When an individual is ready for change, a process of grieving is initiated. It may require accepting past suffering and lost opportunities or lost time.

=== Formation of healthy coping strategies and meaningful internal schema ===
The development of personal coping strategies (including self-management or self-help) is said to be an important element. This can involve making use of medication or psychotherapy if the patient is fully informed and listened to, including about adverse effects and about which methods fit with the consumer's life and their journey of recovery. Developing coping and problem solving skills to manage individual traits and problem issues (which may or may not be seen as symptoms of mental disorder) may require a person becoming their own expert, in order to identify key stress points and possible crisis points, and to understand and develop personal ways of responding and coping. Developing a sense of meaning and overall purpose is said to be important for sustaining the recovery process. This may involve recovering or developing a social or work role. It may also involve renewing, finding or developing a guiding philosophy, religion, politics or culture. From a postmodern perspective, this can be seen as developing a narrative.

=== Empowerment and building a secure base ===
Building a positive culture of healing is essential in the recovery approach. Since recovering is a long process, a strong supportive network can be helpful. Appropriate housing, a sufficient income, freedom from violence, and adequate access to health care have also been proposed as important tools to empowering someone and increasing their self-sufficiency. Empowerment and self-determination are said to be important to recovery for reducing the social and psychological effects of stress and trauma. Women's Empowerment Theory suggests that recovery from mental illness, substance abuse, and trauma requires helping survivors understand their rights so they can increase their capacity to make autonomous choices. This can mean develop the confidence for independent assertive decision making and help-seeking which translates into proper medication and active self care practices. Achieving social inclusion and overcoming challenging social stigma and prejudice about mental distress/disorder/difference is also an important part of empowerment. Advocates of Women's Empowerment Theory argue it is important to recognize that a recovering person's view of self is perpetuated by stereotypes and combating those narratives. Empowerment according to this logic requires reframing a survivor's view of self and the world. In practice, empowerment and building a secure base require mutually supportive relationships between survivors and service providers, identifying a survivor's existing strengths, and an awareness of the survivor's trauma and cultural context.

== Concepts of recovery ==
=== Varied definitions ===
What constitutes 'recovery', or a recovery model, is a matter of ongoing debate both in theory and in practice. In general, professionalized clinical models tend to focus on improvement in particular symptoms and functions, and on the role of treatments, while consumer/survivor models tend to put more emphasis on peer support, empowerment and real-world personal experience. "Recovery from", the medical approach, is defined by a dwindling of symptoms, whereas "recovery in", the peer approach, may still involve symptoms, but the person feels they are gaining more control over their life. Similarly, recovery may be viewed in terms of a social model of disability rather than a medical model of disability, and there may be differences in the acceptance of diagnostic "labels" and treatments.

A review of research suggested that writers on recovery are rarely explicit about which of the various concepts they are employing. The reviewers classified the approaches they found in to broadly "rehabilitation" perspectives, which they defined as being focused on life and meaning within the context of enduring disability, and "clinical" perspectives which focused on observable remission of symptoms and restoration of functioning. From a psychiatric rehabilitation perspective, a number of additional qualities of the recovery process have been suggested, including that it: can occur without professional intervention, but requires people who believe in and stand by the person in recovery; does not depend on believing certain theories about the cause of conditions; can be said to occur even if symptoms later re-occur, but does change the frequency and duration of symptoms; requires recovery from the consequences of a psychiatric condition as well as the condition itself; is not linear but does tend to take place as a series of small steps; does not mean the person was never really psychiatrically disabled; focuses on wellness not illness, and on consumer choice.

A consensus statement on mental health recovery from US agencies, that involved some consumer input, defined recovery as a journey of healing and transformation enabling a person with a mental health problem to live a meaningful life in a community of his or her choice while striving to achieve his or her full potential. Ten fundamental components were elucidated, all assuming that the person continues to be a "consumer" or to have a "mental disability". Conferences have been held on the importance of the "elusive" concept from the perspectives of consumers and psychiatrists.

One approach to recovery known as the Tidal Model focuses on the continuous process of change inherent in all people, conveying the meaning of experiences through water metaphors. Crisis is seen as involving opportunity; creativity is valued; and different domains are explored such as sense of security, personal narrative and relationships. Initially developed by mental health nurses along with service users, Tidal is a particular model that has been specifically researched. Based on a discrete set of values (the Ten Commitments), it emphasizes the importance of each person's own voice, resourcefulness and wisdom. Since 1999, projects based on the Tidal Model have been established in several countries.

For many, recovery has a political as well as personal implication—where to recover is to: find meaning; challenge prejudice (including diagnostic "labels" in some cases); perhaps to be a "bad" non-compliant patient and refuse to accept the indoctrination of the system; to reclaim a chosen life and place within society; and to validate the self. Recovery can thus be viewed as one manifestation of empowerment. Such an empowerment model may emphasize that conditions are not necessarily permanent; that other people have recovered who can be role models and share experiences; and that "symptoms" can be understood as expressions of distress related to emotions and other people. One such model from the US National Empowerment Center proposes a number of principles of how people recover and seeks to identify the characteristics of people in recovery.

In general, recovery may be seen as more of a philosophy or attitude than a specific model, requiring fundamentally that "we regain personal power and a valued place in our communities. Sometimes we need services to support us to get there".

=== Recovery from substance dependence ===
Particular kinds of recovery models have been adopted in drug rehabilitation services. While interventions in this area have tended to focus on harm reduction, particularly through substitute prescribing (or alternatively requiring total abstinence) recovery approaches have emphasized the need to simultaneously address the whole of people's lives, and to encourage aspirations while promoting equal access and opportunities within society. Some examples of harm reduction services include overdose reversal medications (such as Narcan), substance testing kits, supplies for sterile injections, HIV, HBV, and HCV at-home testing equipment– and trauma-informed care in the form of group therapy, community building/events, case management, and rental assistance services. The purpose of this model is to rehabilitate those experiencing addiction in a holistic way rather than through law enforcement and criminal justice-based intervention which can fail to address victims' circumstances on a need-by-need basis. From the perspective of services the work may include helping people with "developing the skills to prevent relapse into further illegal drug taking, rebuilding broken relationships or forging new ones, actively engaging in meaningful activities and taking steps to build a home and provide for themselves and their families. Milestones could be as simple as gaining weight, re-establishing relationships with friends, or building self-esteem. What is key is that recovery is sustained.". Key to the philosophy of the recovery movement is the aim for an equal relationship between "Experts by Profession" and "Experts by Experience".

=== Trauma-informed recovery ===
Trauma-informed care is a philosophy for recovery that combines the conditions and needs of people recovering from mental illness or substance abuse into one framework. This framework combines all of the elements of the recovery approach and adds an awareness of trauma. Advocates of trauma-informed care argue the principles and strategies should be applied to individuals experiencing mental illness, substance dependence, and trauma as these three often occur simultaneously or as result of each other. The paradigms surrounding trauma-informed care began to shift in 1998 and 1999. In 1998, the Center for Mental Health Services, the Center for Substance Abuse Treatment, and the Center for Substance Abuse Prevention collaborated to fund 14 sites to develop integrated services in order to address the interrelated effects of violence, mental health, and substance abuse. In 1999, the National Association of State Mental Health Program Directors passed a resolution recognizing the impact of violence and trauma and developed resources for the implementation of trauma services in state mental health agencies. Trauma-informed care has been supported in academia as well. Scholars claim that neglecting the role of trauma in a person's history can interfere with recovery in the form of misdiagnosis, inaccurate treatment, or retraumatization. Some principles of trauma-informed care include validating survivor experiences and resiliency, aiming to increase survivors' control over their recovery, creating atmospheres for recovery that embody consistency and confidentiality, minimizing the possibilities of triggering past trauma, and integrating survivors and recovering people in service evaluation. In practice, trauma-informed care has shown to be most effective when every participant in a service-providing context to be committed to following these principles. In addition, these principles can apply to all steps of the recovery process within a service-providing context, including outreach and engagement, screening, advocacy, crisis intervention, and resource coordination. The overall goal in trauma-informed care is facilitating healing and empowerment using strengths-based empowerment practices and a comprehensive array of services that integrate co-occurring disorders and the multitude of needs a recovering person might have, such as drug treatment, housing, relationship building, and parenting support.

These approaches are in contrast to traditional care systems. Advocates of trauma-informed care criticize traditional service delivery systems, such as standard hospitals, for failing to understand the role of trauma in a patient's life. Traditional service delivery systems are also criticized for isolating the conditions of a recovering person and not addressing conditions such as substance abuse and mental illness simultaneously. Specific practices in traditional service delivery systems, such as unnecessary procedures, undressing for examinations, involuntary hospitalizations, crowded emergency rooms, and limited time for providers to meet with patients have all been critiqued as insensitive to persons recovering from trauma and consequential mental illness or substance abuse. Limited resources and time in the United States healthcare system can make the implementation of trauma-informed care difficult.

There are other challenges to trauma-informed care besides limits in the United States healthcare system that can make trauma-informed care ineffective for treating persons recovering from mental illness or substance dependence. Advocates of trauma-informed care argue implementation requires a strong commitment from leadership in an agency to train staff members to be trauma-aware, but this training can be costly and time-consuming. "Trauma-informed care" and "trauma" also have contested definitions and can be hard to measure in a real-world service setting. Another barrier to trauma-informed care is the necessity of screening for histories of trauma. While agencies need to screen for histories of trauma in order to give the best care, there can be feelings of shame and fear of being invalidated that can prevent a recovering person from disclosing their personal experiences.

=== Concerns ===
Some concerns have been raised about a recovery approach in theory and in practice. These include suggestions that it is an old concept, only happens to very few people, represents an irresponsible fad, happens only as a result of active treatment, implies a cure, can only be implemented with new resources, adds to the burden of already stretched providers, is neither reimbursable nor evidence-based, devalues the role of professional intervention, and increases providers' exposure to risk and liability.

Other criticisms focus on practical implementation by service providers. include that the recovery model can be manipulated by officials to serve various political and financial interests by, for example, withdrawing services and pushing people out of treatment before they are ready; that the recovery model is becoming a new orthodoxy or bandwagon that neglects the empowerment aspects and structural problems of societies and primarily represents a middle-class experience; that it hides the continued dominance of a medical model; and that it potentially increases social exclusion and marginalizes those who do not fit into a recovery narrative.

There have been specific tensions between recovery models and "evidence-based practice" models in the transformation of US mental health services based on the recommendations of the New Freedom Commission on Mental Health. The commission's emphasis on recovery has been interpreted by some critics as ithat everyone can fully recover through sheer willpower and therefore as giving false hope and implicitly blaming those who may be unable to recover. In turn, tohe critics have themselves been charged with undermining consumer rights and failing to recognize that the model is intended to support a person in their personal journey rather than expecting a given outcome, and that it relates to social and political support and empowerment as well as the individual.

Various stages of resistance to recovery approaches have been identified amongst staff in traditional services, starting with "Our people are much sicker than yours. They won't be able to recover" and ending in "Our doctors will never agree to this". However, ways to harness the energy of this perceived resistance and use it to move forward have been proposed. In addition, staff training materials have been developed by various organisations such as the National Empowerment Center.

Some positives and negatives of recovery models were highlighted in a study of a community mental health service for people diagnosed with schizophrenia. It was concluded that while the approach may be a useful corrective to the usual style of case management—at least, when genuinely chosen and shaped by each individual involved—serious social, institutional and personal difficulties made it essential that there be sufficient ongoing effective support with stress management and coping in daily life. Cultural biases and uncertainties were also noted in the 'North American' model of recovery in practice, reflecting views about the sorts of contributions and lifestyles that should be considered valuable or acceptable.

=== Assessment ===
A number of standardized questionnaires and assessments have been developed to try to assess aspects of an individual's recovery process. These include the Milestones of Recovery (MOR) Scale, Recovery Enhancing Environment (REE) measure, Recovery Measurement Tool (RMT), Recovery Oriented System Indicators (ROSI) Measure, Stages of Recovery Instrument (STORI), and other related instruments.

The data-collection systems and terminology used by services and funders are said to be typically incompatible with recovery frameworks, so methods of adapting them have been developed. It has also been argued that the Diagnostic and Statistical Manual of Mental Disorders (and to some extent any system of categorical classification of mental disorders) uses definitions and terminology that are inconsistent with a recovery model, leading to suggestions that the next version, the DSM-V, requires greater sensitivity to cultural issues and gender, to recognize the need for others to change as well as just those singled out for a diagnosis of disorder, and to adopt a dimensional approach to assessment that better captures individuality and does not erroneously imply excess psychopathology or chronicity.

== National policies and implementation ==
=== United States and Canada ===
The New Freedom Commission on Mental Health has proposed to transform the mental health system in the US by shifting the paradigm of care from traditional medical psychiatric treatment toward the concept of recovery, and the American Psychiatric Association has endorsed a recovery model from a psychiatric services perspective.

The US Department of Health and Human Services reports developing national and state initiatives to empower consumers and support recovery, with specific committees planning to launch nationwide pro-recovery, anti-stigma education campaigns; develop and synthesize recovery policies; train consumers in carrying out evaluations of mental health systems; and help further the development of peer-run services. Mental health service directors and planners are providing guidance to help state services implement recovery approaches.

Some US states, such as California (via the California Mental Health Services Act), Wisconsin and Ohio, already report redesigning their mental health systems to stress recovery model values like hope, healing, empowerment, social connectedness, human rights, and recovery-oriented services.

At least some parts of the Canadian Mental Health Association, such as the Ontario region, have adopted recovery as a guiding principle for reforming and developing the mental health system.

=== New Zealand and Australia ===
Since 1998, all mental health services in New Zealand have been required by government policy to use a recovery approach and mental health professionals are expected to demonstrate competence in the recovery model. Australia's National Mental Health Plan 2003-2008 states that services should adopt a recovery orientation although there is variation between Australian states and territories in the level of knowledge, commitment and implementation.

=== UK and Ireland ===
In 2005, the National Institute for Mental Health in England (NIMHE) endorsed a recovery model as a possible guiding principle of mental health service provision and public education. The National Health Service is implementing a recovery approach in at least some regions, and has developed a new professional role of Support Time and Recovery Worker. Centre for Mental Health issued a 2008 policy paper proposing that the recovery approach is an idea "whose time has come" and, in partnership with the NHS Confederation Mental Health Network, and support and funding from the Department of Health, manages the Implementing Recovery through Organisational Change (ImROC) nationwide project that aims to put recovery at the heart of mental health services in the UK. The Scottish Executive has included the promotion and support of recovery as one of its four key mental health aims and funded a Scottish Recovery Network to facilitate this. A 2006 review of nursing in Scotland recommended a recovery approach as the model for mental health nursing care and intervention. The Mental Health Commission of Ireland reports that its guiding documents place the service user at the core and emphasize an individual's personal journey towards recovery.

== See also ==
- Addiction recovery groups
- Anti-psychiatry
- Clinical psychology
- Capability approach
- Celebrate Recovery
- Critical Psychiatry Network
- Emotions Anonymous
- Hearing Voices Movement
- Hearing Voices Network
- GROW
- Mark Ragins
- Mentalism (discrimination)
- Physical medicine and rehabilitation
- Recovery coaching
- Recovery International
- Rethinking Madness
- Self-help groups for mental health
- Shared decision making
- Social firm
- Social psychiatry
- Social work
- Soteria (psychiatric treatment)
- Therapeutic community
- United States Psychiatric Rehabilitation Association
- Wellness Recovery Action Plan
