= Cornelius Keogh =

Australian Catholic priest

Father Cornelius Brendan (Con) Keogh OAM, (13 July 1921 – 24 November 2011) was an Australian Roman Catholic priest who founded the International Community Mental Health Movement GROW.

Keogh entered the seminary in Springwood, New South Wales, at 18 years of age. Later he studied in Rome, obtaining degrees in philosophy and theology, and was ordained. On his return to Australia he became Professor of Philosophy at his former seminary.

In 1954, Keogh began to suffer mental illness, and over the next few years he underwent episodes of hospitalisation for his condition. During 1957, whilst he was recovering from one such episode, he began attending meetings of Alcoholics Anonymous, because there was at that stage no other support group available. Along with others who were also recovering from mental illness, Keogh began to develop the programme material and the structured network of support groups which became the GROW organisation. In 1978, GROW spread outside Australia: Keogh established the GROW programme in Illinois. In the 2004 Australia Day Honours, Keogh was awarded the Medal of the Order of Australia (OAM) "for service to the community, particularly through rehabilitation support for people with a mental illness as co-founder of GROW."

Keogh resided in Sydney for most of his later years. He died there on 24 November 2011.
