= GROW (support group) =

Peer support organization for mental health

Grow is a peer support and mutual-aid organization for recovery from, and prevention of, mental illness.

Grow was founded in Sydney, Australia in 1957 by Father Cornelius B. "Con" Keogh, a Roman Catholic priest, and psychiatric patients who sought help with their mental illness in Alcoholics Anonymous (AA). Consequently, Grow adapted many of AA's principles and practices. Much of Grow's initial development was made possible with support from Orval Hobart Mowrer, Reuben F. Scarf, W. Clement Stone and Lions Clubs International. As the organization matured, Grow members learned of Recovery International, an organization also created to help people with serious mental illness, and integrated aspects of its will-training methods.

As of 2005 there were more than 800 Grow groups active worldwide. Grow groups are open to anyone who would like to join.

"Grow" is not an acronym.

Grow has no affiliation with any organised religion or church, and is not itself any sort of religion or church. While some parts of the Grow program refer to God due to the role God has played in the recovery and growth of many Growers from the beginning, alternative non-religious phrasings are provided.

== Stages of decline and steps to recovery and growth ==
Grow's literature includes the Twelve Stages of Decline, which indicate that emotional illness begins with self-centeredness, and the Twelve Steps of Personal Growth, a blend of AA's Twelve Steps and will-training methods from Recovery International. Grow members view recovery as an ongoing philosophy of life rather than an outcome and are encouraged to continue following the Steps after completing them in order to maintain their mental health.

The Twelve Stages of Decline

1. We placed too much importance on ourselves and our feelings.
2. We grew inattentive to the presence of goodness and natural order in our lives OR We grew inattentive to God's presence and natural order in our lives.
3. We let competitive motives, in our dealings with others, prevail over our common personal welfare.
4. We expressed our suppressed certain feelings against the better judgment of conscience or sound advice.
5. We began thinking in isolation from others, following feelings and imagination instead of reason.
6. We neglected the care and control of our bodies.
7. We avoided recognizing our personal decline and shrank from the task of changing.
8. We systematically denied the real nature of our unhealthy conduct creating imaginary scenarios to justify it.
9. We became prey to obsessions, delusions and hallucinations.
10. We practised irrational habits, under elated feelings of irresponsibility or despairing feelings of inability or compulsion.
11. We refused to listen to the voice of reason offered by friends, family and professionals, and rejected all offers of help.
12. We lost all insight into our condition.

The Twelve Steps of Recovery and Personal Growth

1. We admitted to personal disorder in our lives.
2. We firmly resolved to restore order in our lives and co-operated with the help that we needed.
3. We surrendered to the healing power God OR We surrendered to the healing power of truth.
4. We made personal inventory and accepted ourselves.
5. We made moral inventory and cleaned out our hearts.
6. We endured until 'cured'.
7. We took care and control of our bodies.
8. We learned to think by reason rather than by feelings and imagination.
9. We trained our wills to regulate our feelings.
10. We took our responsible and caring place in the wider community.
11. We grew daily closer to maturity.
12. We carried Grow's hopeful, healing, and transforming message to others in need.

== Literature ==
The program of personal growth, generally referred to as the 'Blue Book', is the main book used in Grow groups (94 pages). It is divided into three sections based on the developmental stages of members: 'Beginning Growers', 'Progressing Growers' and 'Seasoned Growers'. There are related books used in conjunction with the Blue Book:

- Keogh, Cornelius B. (1975). Readings for mental health (the "Brown Book"). Sydney, Australia: Grow Publications. ISBN 0-909114-00-5. OCLC 47699449.
- Waters, Anne (2005). Growing to Maturity: A Potpourri of Readings for Mental Health (the "Lavender Book"). Grow in Ireland Ltd. ISBN 0-9529198-2-6.
- Mussey, Carol (n.d.). Steps to Recovery: An Anthology of Literature (the "Aqua Book"). Grow.
- Grow Australia (2022). Growing to Recovery (the "Green Book"). Grow Australia. ISBN 978-0-646-85944-6.

== Effectiveness ==
Participation in Grow has been shown to decrease the number of hospitalizations per member as well as the duration of hospitalizations when they occur. Members report an increased sense of security and self-esteem, and decreased anxiety. A longitudinal study of Grow membership found time involved in the program correlated with increased autonomy, environmental mastery, personal Growth, self-acceptance and social skills. Women in particular experience positive identity transformation, build friendships and find a sense of community in Grow groups.

=== Qualitative analysis ===
Statistical evaluations of interviews with Grow members found they identified self-reliance, industriousness, peer support, and gaining a sense of personal value or self-esteem as the essential ingredients of recovery. Similar evaluations of Grow's literature revealed thirteen core principles of Grow's program. They are reproduced in the list below by order of relevance, with a quote from Grow's literature, explaining the principle.

1. Be Reasonable: "We learned to think by reason rather than by feelings and imagination."
2. Decentralize, participate in community: "...decentralization from self and participation in a community of persons is the very process of recovery or personal Growth."
3. Surrender to the Healing Power of a wise and loving God: "God, who made me and everything connected with me, can overcome any and every evil that affects my life."
4. Grow Closer to Maturity: "Maturity is a coming to terms with oneself, with others, and with life as a whole."
5. Activate One's Self to Recover and Grow "Take your fingers off your pulse and start living."
6. Become Hopeful: "I can, and ultimately will, become completely well; God who made me can restore me and enable me to do my part. The best in life and love and happiness is ahead of me."
7. Settle for Disorder: "Settle for disorder in lesser things for the sake of order in greater things; and therefore be content to be discontent in many things."
8. Be Ordinary: "I can do whatever ordinary good people do, and avoid whatever ordinary good people avoid. My special abilities will develop in harmony only if my foremost aim is to be a good ordinary human being."
9. Help Others: We carried the Grow message to others in need.
10. Accept One's Personal Value: "No matter how bad my physical, mental, social or spiritual condition I am always a human person, loved by God and a connecting link between persons; I am still valuable, my life has a purpose, and I have my unique place and my unique part in my Creator's own saving, healing and transforming work."
11. Use Grow: "Use the hopeful and cheerful language of Grow."
12. Gain Insight: "We made moral inventory and cleaned out our hearts."
13. Accept Help: "We firmly resolved to get well and co-operated with the help that we needed."

== See also ==
- Emotions Anonymous
- Neurotics Anonymous
- Recovery International (formerly Recovery, Inc.)
- Self-help groups for mental health
