= Schizophrenics Anonymous =

Peer support group

Schizophrenics Anonymous is a peer support group to help people who are affected by schizophrenia and related disorders including bipolar disorder, schizoaffective disorder, psychotic depression and psychosis.

== History ==
The program was established in Detroit in 1985. The founder was Joanne Verbanic, who was diagnosed with schizophrenia in 1970. Shortly before forming SA, Verbanic publicly disclosed her diagnosis and discussed her illness on national television in an effort to challenge the stigma associated with the condition. She was a 2006 recipient of a Lilly Reintegration Award in recognition of her lifetime contributions to the mental health community, and she continued to be active as a spokesperson for persons with schizophrenia and other mental illness until her death on May 7, 2015.

By 2007, more than 150 local SA groups operated in 31 of the 50 United States, and in Australia, Brazil, Canada, Mexico, France, India and Venezuela.

Technical support for Schizophrenics Anonymous was provided by the National Schizophrenia Foundation (NSF) until 2007 when NSF ceased operations. In response to the loss of a national sponsor, a group of consumers, family members, and mental health providers came together to form a not-for-profit organization, Schizophrenia and Related Disorders Alliance of America (SARDAA).

SARDAA promotes recovery for persons with schizophrenia and related brain disorders including bipolar disorder, schizoaffective disorder, depression with psychosis, and experience with psychosis. They envision a future in which every person with a schizophrenia-related brain disorder has the opportunity to recover from their disorders. The name Schizophrenics Anonymous was changed to Schizophrenia Alliance in 2015 and added Psychosis Support and Acceptance in 2018. They provide an online directory of SA groups, sponsor five weekly SA conference calls, and one Family and Friends conference call. At their annual conference, the group trains individuals and groups who have started or would like to start an SA group.

Although some SA groups are organized by mental health professionals, research has suggested that peer-led SA groups are more sustainable and longer lasting. Some groups are organized in psychiatric hospitals or jails and are not open to the public.

== Program principles ==
The SA program is based on the twelve-step model, but includes just six steps. The organization describes the program's purpose of helping participants to learn about schizophrenia, "restore dignity and sense of purpose," obtain "fellowship, positive support, and companionship," improve their attitudes about their lives and their illnesses, and take "positive steps towards recovery."

Joanne Verbanic wrote the original "Schizophrenics Anonymous" book, better known as "The Blue Book," which describes the six steps to recovery. The steps require members to admit they need help, take responsibility for their choices and consequences, believe they have the inner strength to help themselves and others, forgive themselves and others, understand that false beliefs contribute to their problems and change those beliefs, and decide to turn their lives over to a higher power.

== Research ==
One study about the risks of professional partnerships centers on the partnership between Schizophrenics Anonymous (SA) and the Mental Health Association of Michigan (MHAM) over a 14-year period. The study shows that the professional partnership resulted in increased access to SA Groups across Michigan and organization expansion and development within SA. The professional influence also lead more SA Groups to be held in more traditional mental health treatment settings and led to more professional-led SA groups.

Self-help groups are more available to people who live independently. Researchers at Michigan State University studied whether SA would be successful in group homes. The results were positive: the groups had high attendance and participation and were well liked. However, staff members controlled who could lead and who could attend the meetings, and how the meetings should be run. The programs fell apart. The same obstacle occurred in SA groups started in prisons and monitored by employees.

== See also ==
- Self-help groups for mental health
- Treatment of schizophrenia
