= Self-help groups for mental health =

Mental health organizations

Self-help groups for mental health are voluntary associations of people who share a common desire to overcome mental illness, or otherwise increase their level of psychological wellbeing. (Note: This article focuses on groups for which members do not need to share a common diagnosis or etiology of their mental illness. Improving mental health and wellbeing is also a desired outcome of groups like Alcoholics Anonymous and Survivors Network of those Abused by Priests. In those cases, for example, members share the trait of alcoholism or traumatic experiences of abuse by priests and those groups focus on improving the mental health and wellbeing of members while acknowledging their shared circumstances.) Despite the different approaches, many of the psychosocial processes in the groups are the same. Self-help groups have had varying relationships with mental health professionals. Due to the nature of these groups, self-help groups can help defray the costs of mental health treatment and implementation into the existing mental health system could help provide treatment to a greater number of the mentally ill population.

== Types ==
=== Mutual support and self-help ===
Mutual support or peer support is a process by which people voluntarily come together to help each other address common problems. Mutual support is social, emotional or instrumental support that is mutually offered or provided by persons with similar mental health conditions where there is some mutual agreement on what is helpful. The Depression and Bipolar Support Alliance (DBSA) is an example of a mutual help organization that organizes mutual support groups for people with depression and bipolar disorder.

Mutual support may include many other mental health consumer non-profits and social groups. Such groups are further distinguished as either Individual Therapy (inner-focused) or Social Reform (outer-focused) groups. The former is where members seek to improve themselves, where as the latter set encompasses advocacy organizations such as the National Alliance on Mental Illness and Psychiatric Rehabilitation Association.

Self-help groups are subsets of mutual support and peer support groups, and have a specific purpose for mutual aid in satisfying a common need, overcoming a shared handicap or life-disrupting problem. Self-help groups are less bureaucratic and work on a more grassroots level. Self-help Organizations are national affiliates of local self-help groups or mental health consumer groups that finance research, maintain public relations or lobby for legislation in favor of those affected.

=== Behavior Control or Stress Coping groups ===
Of individual therapy groups, researchers distinguish between Behavior Control groups (such as Alcoholics Anonymous and TOPS) and Stress Coping groups (such as mental health support groups, cancer patient support groups, and groups of single parents). German researchers refer to Stress Coping groups as Conversation Circles.

Significant differences exist between Behavioral Control groups and Stress Coping groups. Meetings of Behavior Control groups tend to be significantly larger than Stress Coping counterparts (by more than a factor of two). Behavior Control group members have a longer average group tenure than members of Stress Coping groups (45 months compared to 11 months) and are less likely to consider their membership as temporary. While very few members of either set saw professionals concurrently while being active in their group, Stress Coping members were more likely to have previously seen professionals than Behavior Control group members. Similarly, Stress Coping groups worked closer with mental health professionals.

=== Member vs professional leadership ===
Member leadership. In Germany, a specific subset of Conversation Circles are categorized as Talking Groups (Gesprächsselbsthilfegruppen). In Talking Groups all members of the group have the same rights, each member is responsible only for themselves (group members do not make decisions for other group members), each group is autonomous, everyone attends the group on account of their own problems, whatever is discussed in the group remains confidential, and participation is free of charge.

Professionally led group psychotherapy. Self-help groups are not intended to provide "deep" psychotherapy. Nevertheless, their emphasis on psychosocial processes and the understanding shared by those with the same or similar mental illnesses does achieve constructive treatment goals.

Interpersonal learning, which is done through processes such as feedback and confrontation, is generally deemphasized in self-help groups. This is largely because it can be threatening, and requires training and understanding of small group processes. Similarly, reality testing is also deemphasized. Reality testing relies on consensual validation, offering feedback, seeking feedback and confrontation. These processes seldom occur in self-help groups, though they frequently occur in professionally directed groups.

==== Professional affiliation and group lifespan ====
If self-help groups are not affiliated with a national organization, professional involvement increases their life expectancy. Conversely, if particular groups are affiliated with a national organization professional involvement decreases their life expectancy. Rules enforcing self-regulation in Talking Groups are essential for the group's effectiveness.

=== Typology of self-help groups ===
In 1991 researchers Marsha A. Schubert and Thomasina Borkman created five conceptual categorizations for self-help groups.

==== Unaffiliated groups ====
Unaffiliated groups are defined as self-help groups that function independently from any control at state or national levels, and from any other group or professionals. These groups accept all potential members, and everyone has an equal opportunity to volunteer or be elected. Leaders serve to help the groups function by collecting donations not through controlling the members. Experiential knowledge is mostly found, and there is a high emphasis on sharing. An example of an unaffiliated group includes Wildflowers' Movement in Los Angeles.

==== Federated groups ====
Federated groups have superordinate levels of their own self-help organization at state or national levels which makes publicity and literature available. The local unit of the federated self-help group retains full control of its decisions. These groups tend to rely on experiential knowledge, and professionals rarely directly interact. The leaders of these groups would be any members comfortable with the format and willing to accept responsibilities. Leaders do not need to have formal training to gain their title. Examples of a federated self-help group would be Depression and Bipolar Support Alliance (DBSA) and Recovery International.

==== Affiliated groups ====
Affiliated groups are subordinate to another group, a regional or national level of their own organization. Local groups conform to the guidelines of the regional/national groups. Leaders are self-helpers not professional caregivers, and meetings included educational activities and sharing, supplemented by research and professionals. Examples of an affiliated self-help group would be the National Alliance on Mental Illness (NAMI).

==== Managed groups ====
Managed groups are based on a combination of self-help and professional techniques. These groups are populated generally through referrals and group activities are led by group members. Managed groups do not meet all the criteria for self-help groups, and so should be designated professionally controlled support groups. Examples of managed groups are common with support groups in hospitals, such as those with breast cancer survivors and patients that may be managed by a nurse or therapist in some professional fashion.

==== Hybrid groups ====
The hybrid group has characteristics of the affiliated and managed groups. Like affiliated groups, hybrid groups are organized by another level of their own organization. To participate in specialized roles, training is developed by a higher level and enforced through trained leaders or facilitators. Like a managed group, a hybrid group cooperates and interacts with professionals, and that knowledge is highly valued alongside experiential knowledge.

== Group processes ==
No two self-help group are exactly alike, the make-up and attitudes are influenced by the group ideology and environment. In most cases, the group becomes a miniature society that can function like a buffer between the members and the rest of the world. The most essential processes are those that meet personal and social needs in an environment of safety and simplicity. Elegant theoretical formulations, systematic behavioral techniques, and complicated cognitive-restructuring methods are not necessary.

Despite the differences, researchers have identified many psychosocial processes occurring in self-help groups related to their effectiveness. This list includes, but is not limited to: acceptance, behavioral rehearsal, changing member's perspectives of themselves, changing member's perspectives of the world, catharsis, extinction, role modeling, learning new coping strategies, mutual affirmation, personal goal setting, instilling hope, justification, normalization, positive reinforcement, reducing social isolation, reducing stigma, self-disclosure, sharing (or "opening up"), and showing empathy.

Five theoretical frameworks have been used in attempts to explain the effectiveness of self-help groups.

1. Social support: Having a community of people to give physical and emotional comfort, people who love and care, is a moderating factor in the development of psychological and physical disease.
2. Experiential knowledge: Members obtain specialized information and perspectives that other members have obtained through living with severe mental illness. Validation of their approaches to problems increases their confidence.
3. Social learning theory: Members with experience become credible role models.
4. Social comparison theory: Individuals with similar mental illness are attracted to each other in order to establish a sense of normalcy for themselves. Comparing one another to each other is considered to provide other peers with an incentive to change for the better either through upward comparison (looking up to someone as a role model) or downward comparison (seeing an example of how debilitating mental illness can be).
5. Helper theory: Those helping each other feel greater interpersonal competence from changing other's lives for the better. The helpers feel they have gained as much as they have given to others. The helpers receive "personalized learning" from working with helpees. The helpers' self-esteem improves with the social approval received from those they have helped, putting them in a more advantageous position to help others.

A framework derived from common themes in empirical data describes recovery as a contextual nonlinear process, a trend of general improvement with unavoidable paroxysms while negotiating environmental, socioeconomic and internal forces, motivated by a drive to move forward in one's life. The framework identified several negotiation strategies, some designed to accommodate illnesses and others designed to change thinking and behavior. The former category includes strategies such as acceptance and balancing activities. The latter includes positive thinking, increasing one's own personal agency/control and activism within the mental health system.

== Relationship with mental health professionals ==
A 1978 survey of mental health professionals in the United States found they had a relatively favorable opinion of self-help groups and there was a hospitable climate for integration and cooperation with self-help groups in the mental health delivery system. The role of self-help groups in instilling hope, facilitating coping, and improving the quality of life of their members is now widely accepted in many areas both inside and outside of the general medical community.

The 1987 Surgeon's General Workshop marked a publicized call for egalitarian relationships with self-help groups. Surgeon General C. Everett Koop presented at this workshop, advocating for relationships that are not superordinate-subordinate, but rather emphasizing respectful, equal relations.

A survey of psychotherapists in Germany found that 50% of the respondents reported a high or very high acceptance of self-help groups and 43.2% rated their acceptance of self-help groups as moderate. Only 6.8% of respondents rated their acceptance of self-help groups as low or very low.

Surveys of self-help groups have shown very little evidence of antagonism towards mental health professionals. The maxim of self-help groups in the United States is "Doctors know better than we do how sickness can be treated. We know better than doctors how sick people can be treated as humans."

=== Referrals ===
A large majority of self-help users use professional services as a gateway to self-help services, or concurrently with professional service or the aftercare following professional service. Professional referrals to self-help groups thus can be a cost-effective method of continuing mental health services and the two can co-exist within their own fields. While twelve-step groups, such as Alcoholics Anonymous, make an indispensable contribution to the mental and/or substance use (M/SU) professional services system, a vast number of non-twelve-step groups remain underutilized within that system.

Professional referrals to self-help groups for mental health are less effective than arranging for prospective self-help members to meet with veterans of the self-help group. This is true even when compared to referrals from professionals familiar with the self-help group when referring clients to it. Referrals mostly come from informal sources (e.g. family, friends, word of mouth, self). Those attending groups as a result of professional referrals account for only one-fifth to one-third of the population. One survey found 54% of members learned about their self-help group from the media, 40% learned about their group from friends and relatives, and relatively few learned about them from professional referrals.

== Effectiveness ==
Self-help groups are effective for helping people cope with, and recover from, a wide variety of problems. German Talking Groups have been shown to be as effective as psychoanalytically oriented group therapy. Participation in self-help groups for mental health is correlated with reductions in psychiatric hospitalizations, and shorter hospitalizations if they occur. Members demonstrate improved coping skills, greater acceptance of their illness, improved medication adherence, decreased levels of worry, higher satisfaction with their health, improved daily functioning and improved illness management. Participation in self-help groups for mental health encourages more appropriate use of professional services, making the time spent in care more efficient. The amount of time spent in the programs, and how proactive the members are in them, has also been correlated with increased benefits. Decreased hospitalization and shorter durations of hospitalization indicate that self-help groups result in financial savings for the health care system, as hospitalization is one of the most expensive mental health services. Similarly, reduced utilization of other mental health services may translate into additional savings for the system.

While self-help groups for mental health increase self-esteem, reduce stigma, accelerate rehabilitation, improve decision-making, decrease tendency to decompensate under stress, and improve social functioning, they are not always shown to reduce psychiatric symptomatology. The therapeutic effects are attributed to the increased social support, sense of community, education and personal empowerment.

Members of self-help groups for mental health rated their perception of the group's effectiveness on average at 4.3 on a 5-point Likert scale.

Social support, in general, can lead to added benefits in managing stress, a factor that can exacerbate mental illness.

== List ==
=== Adult Children of Alcoholics & Dysfunctional Families ===
Adult Children of Alcoholics (ACA)/Dysfunctional Families is a Twelve Step, Twelve Tradition program for people who grew up in dysfunctional homes.

=== Depression and Bipolar Support Alliance ===
The Depression and Bipolar Support Alliance (DBSA) is a mutual aid organization for people with depression and bipolar disorder with over 300 local chapters and 700 support groups in the United States.

=== Emotions Anonymous ===
Emotions Anonymous (EA) is a derivative program of Neurotics Anonymous and open to anyone who wants to achieve emotional well-being. Following the Twelve Traditions, EA groups cannot accept outside contributions. A similar 12-step program is known as "Emotional Health Anonymous".

=== GROW ===
GROW was founded in Sydney, Australia, in 1957 by a Roman Catholic priest, Father Cornelius Keogh, and people who had sought help with their mental illness at Alcoholics Anonymous (AA) meetings. After its inception, GROW members learned of Recovery, Inc. (the organization now known as Recovery International) and integrated its processes into their program. GROW's original literature includes the Twelve Stages of Decline, which state that emotional illness begins with self-centeredness, and the Twelve Steps of Recovery and Personal Growth, a blend of AA's Twelve Steps and will-training methods from Recovery International. GROW groups are open to anyone who would like to join, though they specifically recruit people who have been in psychiatric hospitals or are socioeconomically disadvantaged. GROW does not operate with funding restrictions and have received state and outside funding in the past.

=== Neurotics Anonymous ===
Neurotics Anonymous is a twelve-step program open to anyone with a desire to become emotionally well. According to the Twelve Traditions followed in the program, Neurotics Anonymous is unable to accept outside contributions. The term "neurotics" or "neuroses" has since fallen out of favor with mental health professionals, with the movement away from the psychoanalytic principles of a DSM-II. Branches of Neurotics Anonymous have since changed their name to Emotions Anonymous, which is currently the name in favor with the Minnesota Groups. Groups in Mexico, however, called Neuróticos Anónimos, still are referred to by the same name, due to the term "neuroticos" having a less pejorative connotation in Spanish. This branch continues to flourish in Mexico City as well as largely Spanish-speaking cities in the United States, such as Los Angeles.

=== Recovery International ===
Recovery, Inc. was founded in Chicago, Illinois, in 1937 by psychiatrist Abraham Low using principles in contrast to those popularized by psychoanalysis. During the organization's annual meeting in June 2007 it was announced that Recovery, Inc. would thereafter be known as Recovery International. Recovery International is open to anyone identifying as "nervous" (a compromise between the loaded term neurotic and the colloquial phrase "nervous breakdown"); strictly encourages members to follow their physician's, social worker's, psychologist's or psychiatrist's orders; and does not operate with funding restrictions.

Axiomatically, Low's program held that "adult life is not driven by instincts but guided by Will." Here, Low's concept of will is nearly the opposite to Arthur Schopenhauer's. Rather than Schopenhauer's framing of Will as a blind, irrational striving, Low's concept of will is the conscious decision to act or to refrain from acting. Low's program is based on increasing that determination to act, self-control, and self-confidence. It is a reasonable and rational extension of Émile Coué's psychotherapy of conscious autosuggestions (while looking in the mirror repeating a phase like "every day, in every way, I'm getting better and better," for example). Recovery International is "twelve-step friendly". Members of any twelve-step group are encouraged to attend Recovery International meetings in addition to their twelve-step group participation.

== Criticism ==
There are several limitations of self-help groups for mental health, including but not limited to their inability to keep detailed records, lack of formal procedures to follow up with members, absence of formal screening procedures for new members, lack formal leadership training, and likely inability of members to recognize a "newcomer" presenting with a serious illness requiring immediate treatment. Additionally, there is a lack of professional or legal regulatory constraints determining how such groups can operate, there is a danger that members may disregard the advice of mental health professionals, and there can be an anti-therapeutic suppression of ambivalence and hostility. Researchers have also elaborated specific criticisms regarding self-help groups' formulaic approach, attrition rates, over-generalization, and "panacea complex".

=== Formulaic approach ===
Researchers have questioned whether formulaic approaches to self-help group therapy, like the Twelve Steps, could stifle creativity or if adherence to them may prevent the group from making useful or necessary changes. Similarly others have criticized self-help group structure as being too rigid.

=== High attrition rates ===
Self-help groups do not have a universal appeal, as 17% of people invited to attend a self-help group will do so. Of those, one third will stay for longer than four months. Those who continue are people who value the meetings and the self-help group experience.

=== Overgeneralization ===
Since these groups are not specifically diagnosis-related but rather for anyone seeking mental and emotional health, they may not provide the necessary sense of community to evoke feelings of oneness required for recovery in self-help groups. Referent power is only one factor contributing to group effectiveness. A study of Schizophrenics Anonymous found expert power to be more influential in measurements of perceived group helpfulness.

=== Panacea complex ===
There is a risk that self-help group members may come to believe that group participation is a panacea—that the group's processes can remedy any problem.

=== Sexual predation and opportunism ===
Often membership of non-associated self-help groups is run by volunteers. Monitoring of relationships and standards of conduct are seldom formalized within a group and are done on a self-regulating basis. This allows undesirable and unethical initiation of sexual and intimate encounters. Predatory and opportunistic behavior can operate in these environments, which, by their nature, involve divulging volatile mental states, medication changes and life circumstances. Information that is normally guarded and deeply personal can be leveraged, thus presenting more of a risk than in other social meetup settings or professionally governed bodies.

== See also ==
- Addiction recovery groups
- List of twelve-step groups
- Depression and Bipolar Support Alliance
- Hearing Voices Movement
- Twelve-step program
- BPDFamily.com
- Cole Resource Center
- Deinstitutionalization
- National Alliance on Mental Illness
- Peer support
- Psychiatric survivors movement
- Recovery model
- Schizophrenics Anonymous
- Self-help
- Social work with groups
