= Recovery International =

American mental health self-help organization

- Founded: November 7th, 1937
- Founder: Abraham Low
- Location: Chicago, Illinois
- Region served: United States, Canada, Israel, India and Ireland
- Method: A system of cognitive techniques for controlling behavior and changing attitudes toward symptoms and fears.
- Website: Recovery International

Recovery International (formerly Recovery, Inc., often referred to simply as Recovery or RI) is a mental health self-help organization founded in 1937 by neuropsychiatrist Abraham Low in Chicago, Illinois. Recovery's program is based on self-control, self-confidence, and increasing one's determination to act. Recovery deals with a range of people, all of whom have difficulty coping with everyday problems, whether or not they have a history of psychiatric hospitalization. It is non-profit, secular, and although it uses methods devised by Low, most groups are currently led by experienced non-professionals.

== History ==
Previous Recovery Logo

Abraham Low, a neuropsychiatrist, began the Recovery groups in 1937, when he was on the faculty at the University of Illinois at Chicago. At that time, Recovery Inc. was an entity of the Neuropsychiatric Institute at the University of Illinois Research and Education Hospital, and participants in Recovery were limited to those who had been hospitalized in the Psychiatric Institute at the university. The original thirty-seven founding members had recovered their mental health after receiving insulin shock treatments at the Institute.

Low began the groups as part of an attempt to improve the patient's care following discharge from his hospital. In the early years of the organization he encouraged members to advocate for improvements in social policies regarding state mental health regulations. Following backlash from the medical community to these efforts, Low disbanded the group in 1941. His patients, however, asked to be trained to teach Recovery's methods to others and in 1942 Low began to teach members to lead groups in their homes.

The organization separated from the Psychiatric Institute in 1942, operating out of private offices in Chicago. New membership at this time was drawn largely from patients in Low's private psychiatry practice. During the first years following its separation Low remained in close contact with all Recovery groups and received regular reports from group leaders. As the membership and number of meetings grew, it made this level of cooperation with the groups untenable. In 1952, Low allowed expansion of Recovery outside of Illinois, giving control of local groups to former patients who had become group leaders. Following Low's death in 1954, Recovery transitioned completely from a professionally run treatment adjunct, to a peer-run self-help group.

Effective January 1, 2007 Recovery, Inc. formally changed its name to Recovery International. On January 1, 2008 Recovery International merged with The Abraham Low Institute and provisionally renamed the new organization Recovery International / The Abraham Low Institute (RI/TALI). On January 1, 2009, Abraham Low Self-Help Systems was incorporated to umbrella several new programs, and the group continues operations as Recovery International and Abraham Low Self-Help Systems in various states and internationally.

== Fundamental concepts ==
=== Symptoms ===
The causes and classification of mental illnesses are considered irrelevant in the Recovery method. Recovery members are simply viewed as people who have developed disturbing symptom-reactions leading to ill-controlled behavior. Symptoms are threatening sensations; including feelings, impulses, and obsessive thoughts. The phrase, "symptomatic idiom" describes the mental association of danger with symptoms.

The symptomatic idiom implies that there is an impending catastrophe of physical collapse, mental collapse, or permanent handicap. In the first instance, for example, a person may consider heart palpitations as signaling that sudden death is imminent, or that a painful headache is caused by a brain tumor; phobias, compulsions, and ruminations would eventually cause a mental collapse. The fear of permanent handicap insists that there is no cure or relief for one's mental illness and that recovery is impossible.

=== Temper ===
Temper is a combination of a feeling and a judgment about oneself or others. The feeling is related to one of the two types of temper, fear or anger. The judgment is that one has been wronged by another, or that one has done something wrong. "Fearful temper" arises from thoughts that one has made a mistake (has done something wrong) which in turn causes feelings such as fear, shame and inadequacy. "Angry temper" results from the belief that one has been wronged which in turn creates feelings of indignation and impatience. There is a two-way relationship between temper and symptoms. Symptoms induce emotions such as fear and anger, which in turn induce temper, which increases the intensity of the symptoms.

"Temperamental lingo" describes language related to judgments of right and wrong, and the use of defeatist language when discussing symptoms. When discussing symptoms, temperamental lingo includes the use of adjectives such as "intolerable," "uncontrollable," "unbearable," and similar language that places an emphasis on the dangerous and fatalistic implications of feelings, impulses, or thoughts.

=== Will ===
Free will is fundamental to Recovery's method. The subconscious, as it is known in psychoanalysis, as well as viewpoints emphasizing unconscious motivations, drives, and instincts are considered to be self-defeating. Recovery considers adults as capable of behaving based on deliberate plans, settled decisions, reasoned conclusions and firm determinations. Will gives adults the ability to accept or reject thoughts and impulses. Recovery members achieve mental health by training their Wills to reject self-defeating thoughts and impulses, countering them with self-endorsing thoughts and wellness-promoting actions.

=== External and Internal Environment ===
Recovery distinguishes between the External Environment, the realities of a situation, and the Internal Environment, one's own subjective feelings, thoughts, impulses, and sensations. Two components of the Internal Environment, thoughts and impulses, can be directly controlled by Will. Control of thoughts and impulses allows indirect control over sensations and feelings. For instance, thoughts of insecurity and anxiousness can be replaced with thoughts of security. Similarly, a feeling of fear can be disposed by removing the associated belief of danger (symptomatic idiom). While the Internal Environment can be changed with cognitive reframing, changing one's External Environment may or may not be possible.

=== Nervousness ===
Recovery focuses on treating former mental patients, sometimes referred to as postpsychotic persons, as well as psychoneurotic persons. The latter group is most often referred to as "nervous" or "nervous patients". Recovery members may refer to themselves as "nervous patients" regardless of whether they are being treated by a physician or other professional. Sociologist Edward Sagarin described this as a compromise between the term neurotic and the more colloquial phrase "nervous breakdown".

== Common techniques ==
Recovery encourages members to cognitively reframe their experiences using several techniques. Spotting, reframing defeatist language, self-endorsement and creating Examples are the most commonly cited in scholarly reviews of Recovery.

=== Spotting ===
Spotting is an introspective relabeling of thoughts and symptoms. When a thought arises related to angry temper, fearful temper, or associating danger with a symptom it must be spotted and reframed. Members practice spotting and reacting appropriately to the distressing thought or symptom.

=== Reframing language ===
Recovery developed its own language for labeling psychiatric symptoms and responding to them. This language is centered around two concepts, "authority" and "sabotage." It is suggested that members rely on the authority of a physician's diagnosis with respect to their symptoms. For instance, if a member self-diagnoses a headache as being caused by a brain tumor, but a physician has diagnosed it otherwise, then the member is said to be sabotaging the physician's authority. This is similarly true for the member's prognosis, if a member despairs that their condition is hopeless, but a physician has found the prognosis to be good, this is also sabotage of the physician's authority. Using the physician's perspective to reframe defeatist thoughts is intended to help members recognize that they have not lost control, and their situation can be coped with.

=== Self-endorsement ===
Members practice self-endorsement of every effort made to use a Recovery method, no matter how small and regardless of the outcome. In this way, similar subsequent efforts will require less work and are more likely to be successful. Similarly members are taught to change their behavior in "part acts" (small steps), to simply "move their muscles" to complete tasks, however small, to eventually complete larger overwhelming tasks.

=== Creating Examples ===
The Example format was created by Low as a means to allow Recovery to function as a stand-alone lay self-help group that would not require professional supervision. Members create Examples by following a four-part outline, each part requiring a description.

1. Details of an event that caused distress.
2. The symptoms and discomfort that the event aroused.
3. How Recovery principles were utilized to cope with the event.
4. How the member would have behaved in response to the event before joining Recovery.

Examples are a formalized way to practice the Recovery program. A successful outcome is not required to create an Example, as all attempts at practicing Recovery methods are endorsed.

== Meetings ==
=== 1937–1952 ===
During the first fifteen years of Recovery, Low required members to attend classes and meetings for at least six months at a cost of ten dollars per month, not including the membership dues of two dollars per year. Members would meet at least three days a week and on Wednesdays take part in panel discussions as panelists or audience members held at a private home. Panel discussions would consist of three to four panelists with considerable experience in Recovery discussing a topic from Low's literature, focusing on spotting and conquering symptoms. Dr. Low would address the audience at the end of each panel discussion summing up the discussion and correcting any misinformation given about Recovery. Every Thursday Low would conduct a group psychotherapy class for Recovery members.

No meetings were held between Saturday and Wednesday. Commonly, novice members would have a "setback," a relapse of psychiatric symptoms, during this time. As setbacks were considered unavoidable, the novice members were assigned to a more experienced member to call or visit should they need assistance. If the assistance provided by the experienced member was not helpful, they could contact a chairperson in their area (a member who functioned like the physician's deputy), and if that was still not satisfactory they could contact the physician, Dr. Low.

=== 1952–Present ===
At the meetings, members share examples from their lives that caused nervous symptoms, the thoughts that occurred just beforehand, how they spotted them and reacted to them. Other members offer alternative ways of looking at the situation and suggest how to better handle similar symptoms in the future. Meetings range in size from 6 to 30 members and follow a rigid schedule to ensure adherence to Recovery methods. Each meeting has a leader in a permanent position; leadership duties do not rotate from meeting to meeting. Each meeting is split into five parts. Members introduce themselves by first name only, as is practiced in Alcoholics Anonymous.

==== Impact of Pandemic (2020-2021) ====
Due to COVID-19, more than 300 community meetings were closed, and many new telephone and online meetings were added. This gives people access to more meetings at various times during the week, regardless of geography.

==== Reading of Recovery literature ====
The beginning of a meeting is generally reserved for reading from Recovery literature. Members take turns reading sections of a chapter or article. Group leaders will often call on new members during this period, or members who are hesitant to volunteer. After finishing a paragraph a group leader will often ask a member if they experienced any symptoms while reading the literature and will endorse them for the efforts to continue reading despite feelings of discomfort or fear of making mistakes.

==== Presentation of Examples ====
Those participating form a "panel" although they are usually seated face-to-face around a table. The group leader reminds the members that examples should be constructed around day-to-day events as Recovery is a non-professional organization and cannot help people with major problems. This statement is qualified, however, with Low's opinion that the majority of a nervous patient's problems are related to "trivial" incidents. Rather than being a limitation of Recovery's program, this is intended to be a novel treatment approach. A day-today trivial event may generalize to other problems experienced by the member. Discussion of trivialities is less threatening than complex problems, making a discussion of coping mechanisms possible.

A survey of groups in Chicago in 1971 and 1977 found that most examples presented were stories of successful application of the Recovery method, less than ten percent represented "problem examples" where the application was not successful.

==== Group participation ====
After an Example has been given, the meeting is opened for "group spotting". During this period other members of the panel are allowed to comment on the Example based on Recovery principles. This group leader usually makes the first comments, and if there are no volunteers to continue, may call on panel members to provide commentary. Comments not based on Recovery's concepts or not related to the example are stopped by the group leader. Comments are either classed as positive, praise for application of a Recovery method, or negative, related to an instance where a method was not applied. An Example rarely passes without mention of additional Recovery techniques that could be applied to it. This serves as a constant reminder that Recovery's method can never be practiced perfectly; members can always learn from experience and benefit from group practice.

For example, a person may experience "lowered feelings" (depression) because they are aiming for a perfect performance. Trying to be perfect or trying to appear perfect leads one to feel down if one makes even the slightest mistake. All improvements, no matter how small, are acknowledged and members are encouraged to endorse themselves for their efforts—not for their successes. Longstanding members are encouraged to share their success with the Recovery methods to help newcomers. Low saw the sharing of successes by veteran members as an essential component of meetings, as it demonstrates that distressing sensations can be endured, impulses can be controlled, and obsessions can be checked.

==== Question and answer ====
Following the panel presentation, about fifteen minutes are set aside for a question and answer period. Any member may ask a question of the panel during this time, newcomers are especially encouraged to participate. Discussion, however, must be limited to the Examples given and related Recovery concepts. Discussion questioning Recovery's method is not allowed. Discussion of psychological theories outside of Recovery is similarly discouraged. In a case where a member brings up a disagreement between his physician and a Recovery concept, he or she is told that the panel is not qualified to provide an answer not related to the Examples presented. Members are expected to follow the advice of their professional; Recovery is not intended as a substitute for psychiatric services, but a self-directed program that can be used as an adjunct to professional treatment, or alone when professional treatment is not available.

==== Mutual aid meeting ====
The formal meeting ends with the question and answer period, and an informal "mutual-aid" gathering usually follows. During this time refreshments are usually served. Members may speak freely with one another and discuss problems or ask for advice, although there is an attempt to keep the discussion within the bounds of Recovery concepts. By convention, discussion of problems are limited to five minutes in an attempt to discourage self-pity and complaining.

== Demographics ==
The results here are from a 1960 survey of groups in Chicago and Michigan. 1,875 surveys were sent; the results are based on the 779 that were returned.

=== Meeting attendance and tenure ===
The 1960 survey of members found participation in Recovery to be a regular and long-term activity. About one-third of the respondents had been in Recovery for less than a year, another third had been in Recovery for one to two years, and another third had participated for two years or more. Most members reported attending meetings weekly, although one-third reported that they no longer needed to attend meetings to function adequately. Observation of meetings in Chicago during 1971 and 1977 found the average member attended only about 37% of meetings, and also found that it was common for newcomers to only attend one meeting and never return.

Recovery does not have a graduation or discharge procedure for members. There is a conflicting goal in Recovery in that while it is intended to rehabilitate members, it also needs to sustain itself to continue this goal, creating a potential danger that rehabilitation of members may be subverted by efforts to maintain the organization's membership. Professional treatment goals, however, generally emphasize the importance of adherence to therapeutic practices. The concern is more commonly that patients will not follow through with them, rather than that they will never stop practicing them.

=== Socioeconomic status ===
According to the 1960 survey, most Recovery respondents are middle-aged, middle-class, female and married with an employed spouse. A survey of members from 1971 and 1977 estimated the mean age of members to be 49 years, and found that most of them were lower middle-class or working class. In contrast, studies of similar groups found most members had never been married, but similar to a specific study of Emotions Anonymous that found most of the members were middle class. Other studies of self-help groups for people with serious mental illness found most of the members were unemployed, while others found members to be predominately working class. A ratio of two (or more) females for every male is common in studies of self-help groups for persons with serious mental illness.

=== Hospitalization ===
The 1960 survey found few members with extensive histories of treatment for mental illness prior to joining Recovery. Half of the respondents reported no previous hospitalization, and about one-fifth had never been treated professionally for a mental illness. Members who reported being hospitalized reported very few instances of short duration. More recent studies have shown that in self-help groups for serious mental illness, approximately 60% (55–75%) of members had been hospitalized for psychiatric reasons.

=== Reasons for joining Recovery ===
Most respondents to the 1960 survey reported having heard of Recovery in the lay press, and joined at the suggestion of a friend or relative. Just one-tenth of the respondents reported having been referred by a physician. They reported joining because of psychological symptoms (fears, delusions, and "nerves"), psychosomatic symptoms (tremors and heart palpitations) and also out of curiosity to see if the organization would help. A survey of members from 1971 and 1977 also found that most members were self-referred.

== Organizational structure ==
From 1952 to 2008, Recovery was run from its office in Chicago by a twelve-member Board of Directors, a number of committees, organization officers, and a full-time paid administrative staff. The Board of Directors was elected at Recovery's annual meeting and served for a period of three years. Authority from the Board of Directors was passed to Area Leaders then to Assistant Area Leaders, District Leaders, and lastly to Group Leaders. Leaders are trained to run Recovery meetings, but are not considered experts or authorities. Policies and practices of Recovery were made by the Board of Directors.

== Family participation ==
In the early years of Recovery, an event was held on Saturday afternoons at Recovery's office in Chicago for Recovery members as well as their relatives and friends. Later, family and friends of members were allowed to attend meetings, although not to participate. In 1943 Low published a book, Lectures to Relatives of Former Patients to help assist them with the recovery effort; this information was later reprinted in Peace Versus Power in the Family: Domestic Discord and Emotional Distress in 1967.

== Effectiveness ==
For more details on this topic, see Self-help groups for mental health: Effectiveness

In 1945, Abraham Low found the average member improved considerably after the first or second week in the program as it existed at that time. However, members were required to lose their major symptoms within two months of membership and class attendance. If they did not, this was taken as an indication that the member was still sabotaging the physician's efforts.

A 1984 study found that following participation in Recovery, former mental patients reported no more anxiety about their mental health than the general public. Members rated their life satisfaction levels as high, or higher, than the general public. Members who had participated two years or more reported the highest levels of satisfaction with their health. Members who participated for less than two years tended to still be taking medication and living below the poverty level with smaller social networks.

A 1988 study found that participation in Recovery decreased members' symptoms of mental illness and the amount of psychiatric treatment needed. About half of the members had been hospitalized before joining. Following participation, less than 8% had been hospitalized. Members' scores of neurotic distress decreased, and scores of psychological well-being for longstanding members were no different from members of a control group in the same community. Long-term members were being treated with less psychiatric medication and psychotherapy than newer members.

== Similar psychotherapies ==
Recovery's methods have been compared to several psychotherapies.

- Behavior modification
- Cognitive behavioral therapy
- Cognitive therapy
- Control theory
- Émile Coué's method
- Rational emotive behavior therapy
- Salutogenesis
- Twelve-step programs

== Awards ==
- In recognition of Recovery's contributions to its field, the organization was given the Arnold L. van Amerigen Award in Psychiatric Rehabilitation from the American Psychiatric Association in 2000.

== Literature ==
=== Books ===
- Low, Abraham (1943). Techniques of Psychiatric Self-help After-care. Chicago: Recovery, Inc. ASIN B0007HZGLE. OCLC 42198367.
- Low, Abraham (1984). Mental Health Through Will Training. Willett Pub. ISBN 978-0-915005-01-7. LCCN 57012246. OCLC 9878531. Archived from the original on 2007-01-12.
- Low, Abraham (1995). Manage Your Fears, Manage Your Anger: A Psychiatrist Speaks. Glencoe, IL: Willett Pub. ISBN 978-0-915005-05-5. OCLC 33243554.

=== Periodicals ===
- Lost and Found OCLC 40956089
- Recovery Reporter OCLC 22518904
- Recovery News OCLC 40735981
- Recovery Journal OCLC 48051647

== See also ==
- Abraham Low
- Abraham Low Self-Help Systems
- Neurotics Anonymous
- Emotions Anonymous
- GROW
- Self-help groups for mental health
- Recovery model
