= Will (philosophy) =

Faculty that selects among a being's desires

Will, within philosophy, is a faculty of the mind. Will is important as one of the parts of the mind, along with reason and understanding. It is considered central to the field of ethics because of its role in enabling deliberate action.

A recurring question in Western philosophical tradition is about free will—and the related, but more general notion of fate—which asks how the will can truly be free if a person's actions have either natural or divine causes determining them. In turn, this is directly connected to discussions on the nature of freedom and to the problem of evil.

== Classical philosophy ==
The classical treatment of the ethical importance of will is to be found in the Nicomachean Ethics of Aristotle, in Books III (chapters 1–5), and Book VII (chapters 1–10). These discussions have been a major influence in the development of ethical and legal thinking in Western civilization.

In Book III, Aristotle divided actions into three categories instead of two:

- Voluntary (ekousion) acts.
- Involuntary or unwilling (akousion) acts, which are in the simplest case where people do not praise or blame. In such cases a person does not choose the wrong thing, for example if the wind carries a person off, or if a person has a wrong understanding of the particular facts of a situation. Note that ignorance of what aims are good and bad, such as people of bad character always have, is not something people typically excuse as ignorance in this sense. "Acting on account of ignorance seems different from acting while being ignorant".
- "Non-voluntary" or "non willing" actions (ouk ekousion) which are bad actions done by choice, or more generally (as in the case of animals and children when desire or spirit causes an action) whenever "the source of the moving of the parts that are instrumental in such actions is in oneself" and anything "up to oneself either to do or not". However, these actions are not taken because they are preferred in their own right, but rather because all options available are worse.

It is concerning this third class of actions that there is doubt about whether they should be praised or blamed or condoned in different cases.

Virtue and vice, according to Aristotle, are "up to us". This means that although no one is willingly unhappy, vice by definition always involves actions which were decided upon willingly. Vice comes from bad habits and aiming at the wrong things, not deliberately aiming to be unhappy. The vices then, are voluntary just as the virtues are. He states that people would have to be unconscious not to realize the importance of allowing themselves to live badly, and he dismisses any idea that different people have different innate visions of what is good.

In Book VII, Aristotle discusses self-mastery, or the difference between what people decide to do, and what they actually do. For Aristotle, akrasia, "unrestraint", is distinct from animal-like behavior because it is specific to humans and involves conscious rational thinking about what to do, even though the conclusions of this thinking are not put into practice. When someone behaves in a purely animal-like way, then for better or worse they are not acting based upon any conscious choice.

Aristotle also addresses a few questions raised earlier, on the basis of what he has explained:

- Not everyone who stands firm on the basis of a rational and even correct decision has self-mastery. Stubborn people are actually more like a person without self-mastery, because they are partly led by the pleasure coming from victory.
- Not everyone who fails to stand firm on the basis of his best deliberations has a true lack of self mastery. As an example he gives the case of Neoptolemus (in Sophocles' Philoctetes) refusing to lie despite being part of a plan he agreed with.
- A person with practical wisdom (phronesis) can not have akrasia. Instead it might sometimes seem so, because mere cleverness can sometimes recite words which might make them sound wise, like an actor or a drunk person reciting poetry. A person lacking self-mastery can have knowledge, but not an active knowledge to which they are paying attention. For example, when someone is in a state such as being drunk or enraged, people may have knowledge, and even show that they have that knowledge, like an actor, but not be using it.

== Medieval European philosophy ==
Aristotle was reintroduced, transmitted, and interpreted partly through Arabic-speaking philosophers, Avicenna and Averroes. Aristotelian philosophy became part of a standard approach to all legal and ethical discussion in Europe by the time of Thomas Aquinas. His philosophy can be seen as a synthesis of Aristotle and early Christian doctrine as formulated by Boethius and Augustine of Hippo, although sources such as Maimonides and Plato and the aforementioned Muslim scholars are also cited.

With the use of Scholasticism, Thomas Aquinas's Summa Theologica makes a structured treatment of the concept of will. A very simple representation of this treatment may look like this:

- Does the will desire nothing? (No.)
- Does it desire all things of necessity, whatever it desires? (No.)
- Is it a higher power than the intellect? (No.)
- Does the will move the intellect? (Yes.)
- Is the will divided into irascible and concupiscible? (No.)

This is related to the following points on free will:

- Does man have free-will? (Yes.)
- What is free-will—a power, an act, or a habit? (A power.)
- If it is a power, is it appetitive or cognitive? (Appetitive.)
- If it is appetitive, is it the same power as the will, or distinct? (The same, with contingencies).

== Early modern philosophy ==
The use of English in philosophical publications began in the early modern period, and therefore the English word "will" became a term used in philosophical discussion. During this same period, Scholasticism, which had largely been a Latin language movement, was heavily criticized. Both Francis Bacon and René Descartes described the human intellect or understanding as something which needed to be considered limited, and needing the help of a methodical and skeptical approach to learning about nature. Bacon emphasized the importance of analyzing experience in an organized way, for example experimentation, while Descartes, seeing the success of Galileo in using mathematics in physics, emphasized the role of methodical reasoning as in mathematics and geometry. Descartes specifically said that error comes about because the will is not limited to judging things which the understanding is limited to, and described the possibility of such judging or choosing things ignorantly, without understanding them, as free will. Dutch theologian Jacobus Arminius, considered the freedom of human will is to work toward individual salvation and constrictions occur due to the work of passion that a person holds. Augustine calls will as "the mother and guardian of all virtues".

Under the influence of Bacon and Descartes, Thomas Hobbes made one of the first attempts to systematically analyze ethical and political matters in a modern way. He defined will in his Leviathan Chapter VI, in words which explicitly criticize the medieval scholastic definitions:

In deliberation, the last appetite, or aversion, immediately adhering to the action, or to the omission thereof, is that we call the will; the act, not the faculty, of willing. And beasts that have deliberation, must necessarily also have will. The definition of the will, given commonly by the Schools, that it is a rational appetite, is not good. For if it were, then could there be no voluntary act against reason. For a voluntary act is that, which proceedeth from the will, and no other. But if instead of a rational appetite, we shall say an appetite resulting from a precedent deliberation, then the definition is the same that I have given here. Will therefore is the last appetite in deliberating. And though we say in common discourse, a man had a will once to do a thing, that nevertheless he forbore to do; yet that is properly but an inclination, which makes no action voluntary; because the action depends not of it, but of the last inclination, or appetite. For if the intervenient appetites, make any action voluntary; then by the same reason all intervenient aversions, should make the same action involuntary; and so one and the same action, should be both voluntary and involuntary.

By this it is manifest, that not only actions that have their beginning from covetousness, ambition, lust, or other appetites to the thing propounded; but also those that have their beginning from aversion, or fear of those consequences that follow the omission, are voluntary actions.

Concerning "free will", most early modern philosophers, including Hobbes, Spinoza, Locke and Hume believed that the term was frequently used in a wrong or illogical sense, and that the philosophical problems concerning any difference between "will" and "free will" are due to verbal confusion (because all will is free):

a FREEMAN, is he, that in those things, which by his strength and wit he is able to do, is not hindered to do what he has a will to. But when the words free, and liberty, are applied to any thing but bodies, they are abused; for that which is not subject to motion, is not subject to impediment: and therefore, when it is said, for example, the way is free, no liberty of the way is signified, but of those that walk in it without stop. And when we say a gift is free, there is not meant any liberty of the gift, but of the giver, that was not bound by any law or covenant to give it. So when we speak freely, it is not the liberty of voice, or pronunciation, but of the man, whom no law hath obliged to speak otherwise than he did. Lastly, from the use of the word free-will, no liberty can be inferred of the will, desire, or inclination, but the liberty of the man; which consisteth in this, that he finds no stop, in doing what he has the will, desire, or inclination to do.."

Spinoza argues that seemingly "free" actions aren't actually free, or that the entire concept is a chimera because "internal" beliefs are necessarily caused by earlier external events. The appearance of the internal is a mistake rooted in ignorance of causes, not in an actual volition, and therefore the will is always determined. Spinoza also rejects teleology, and suggests that the causal nature along with an originary orientation of the universe is everything we encounter.

Some generations later, David Hume made a very similar point to Hobbes in other words:

But to proceed in this reconciling project with regard to the question of liberty and necessity; the most contentious question of metaphysics, the most contentious science; it will not require many words to prove, that all mankind have ever agreed in the doctrine of liberty as well as in that of necessity, and that the whole dispute, in this respect also, has been hitherto merely verbal. For what is meant by liberty, when applied to voluntary actions? We cannot surely mean that actions have so little connexion with motives, inclinations, and circumstances, that one does not follow with a certain degree of uniformity from the other, and that one affords no inference by which we can conclude the existence of the other. For these are plain and acknowledged matters of fact. By liberty, then, we can only mean a power of acting or not acting, according to the determinations of the will; that is, if we choose to remain at rest, we may; if we choose to move, we also may. Now this hypothetical liberty is universally allowed to belong to every one who is not a prisoner and in chains. Here, then, is no subject of dispute.

== Rousseau ==
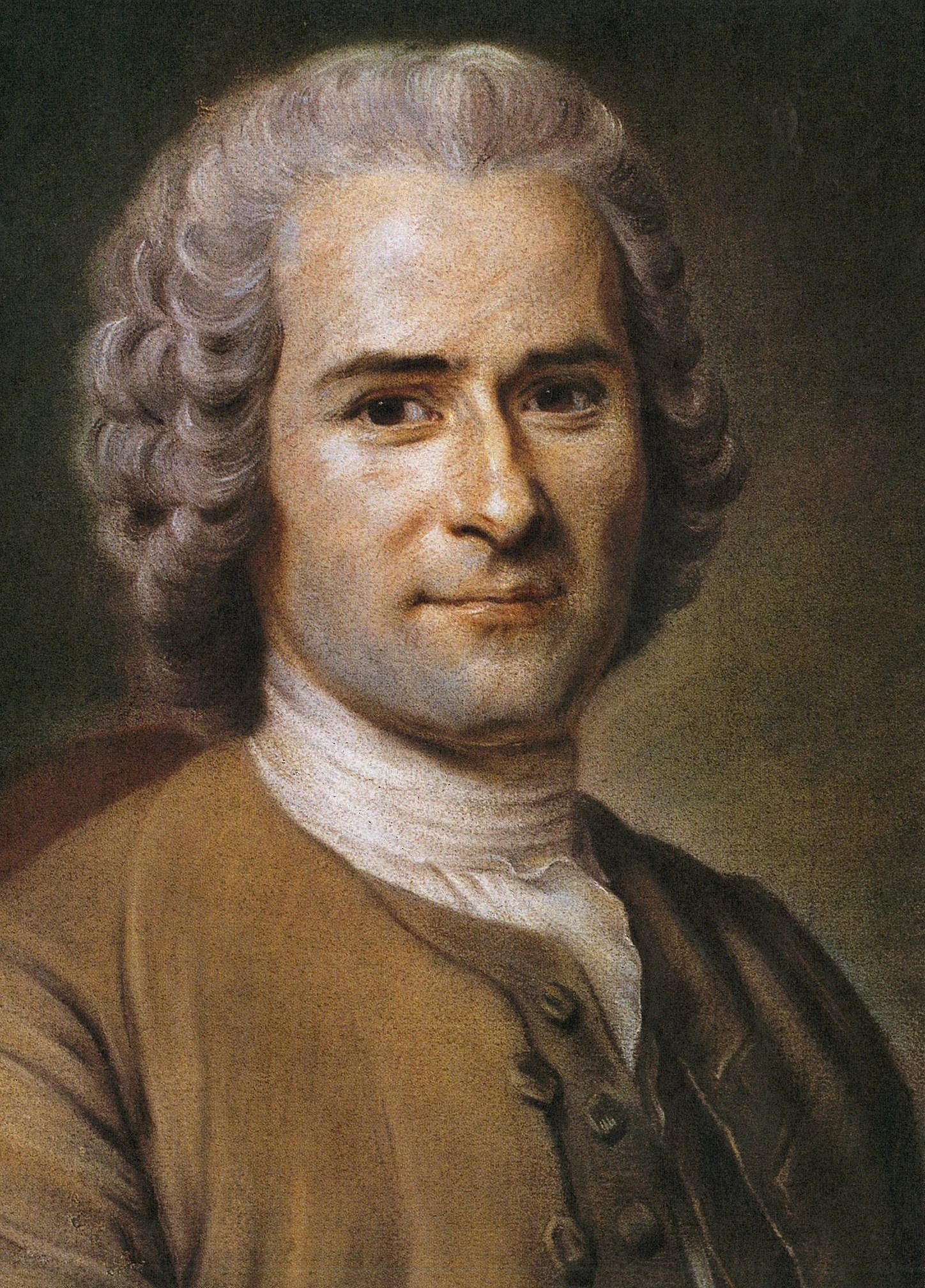
Jean-Jacques Rousseau conceived and popularised the general will

Jean-Jacques Rousseau added a new type of will to those discussed by philosophers, which he called the "general will" (volonté générale). This concept developed from Rousseau's considerations on the social contract theory of Hobbes, and describes the shared will of a whole citizenry, whose agreement is understood to exist in discussions about the legitimacy of governments and laws.

The general will consists of a group of people who believe they are in unison, for which they have one will that is concerned with their collective well-being. In this group, people maintain their autonomy to think and act for themselves—to much concern of libertarians, including "John Locke, David Hume, Adam Smith, and Immanuel Kant," who proclaim an emphasis of individuality and a separation between "public and private spheres of life." Nonetheless, they also think on behalf of the community of which they are a part.

This group creates the social compact, that is supposed to voice cooperation, interdependence, and reciprocal activity. As a result of the general will being expressed in the social contract, the citizens of the community that composes the general will consent to all laws, even those that they disagree with, or are meant to punish them if they disobey the law—the aim of the general will is to guide all of them in social and political life. This, in other words, makes the general will consistent amongst the members of the state, implying that every single one of them have citizenship and have freedom as long as they are consenting to a set of norms and beliefs that promote equality, the common welfare, and lack servitude.

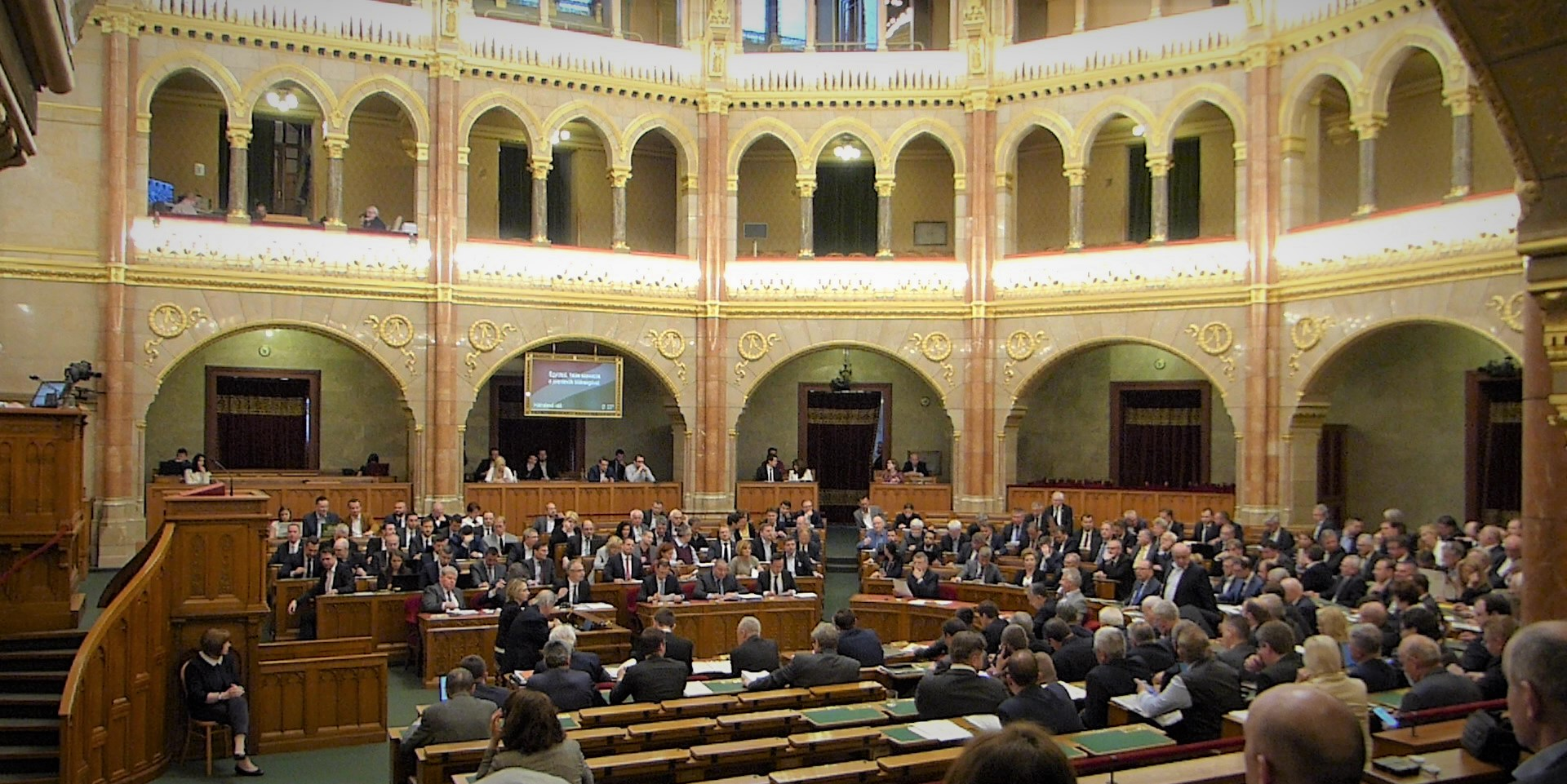
The House of Commons Voting on the Family of Action Plan in Budapest, Hungary—an example of the general will espoused by Rousseau

According to Thompson, the general will has three rules that have to be obeyed in order for the general will to function as intended: (1) the rule of equality—no unequal duties are to be placed upon any other community member for one's personal benefit or for that of the community; (2) the rule of generality—the general will's end must be applicable to the likewise needs of citizens, and all the members' interests are to be accounted for; (3) the rule of non-servitude—no one has to relinquish themselves to any other member of the community, corporation, or individual, nor do they have to be subordinate to the mentioned community's, corporation's, or individuals' interests or wills.

Nonetheless, there are ways in which the general will can fail, as Rousseau mentioned in The Social Contract. If the will does not produce a consensus amongst a majority of its members, but has a minority consensus instead, then liberty is not feasible. Also, the general will is weakened consequent to altruistic interests becoming egoistical, which manifests into debates, further prompting the citizenry to not participate in government, and bills directed for egotistical interests get ratified as "'laws.'" This leads into the distinction between the will of all versus the general will: the former is looking after the interests of oneself or that of a certain faction, whereas the latter is looking out for the interests of society as a whole.

Although Rousseau believes that the general will is beneficial, there are those in the libertarian camp who assert that the will of the individual trumps that of the whole. For instance, G.W.F Hegel criticized Rousseau's general will, in that it could lead to tension. This tension, in Hegel's view is that between the general will and the subjective particularity of the individual. Here is the problem: when one consents to the general will, then individuality is lost as a result of one having to be able to consent to things on behalf of the populace, but, paradoxically, when the general will is in action, impartiality is lost as a result of the general will conforming to one course of action alone, that consented to by the populace.

Another problem that Hegel puts forth is one of arbitrary contingency. For Hegel, the problem is called "'the difference that action implies,'" in which a doer's description of an action varies from that of others, and the question arises, "Who [chooses] which [action] description is appropriate?" To Rousseau, the majority is where the general will resides, but to Hegel that is arbitrary. Hegel's solution is to find universality in society's institutions—this implies that a decision, a rule, etc. must be understandable and the reasoning behind it cannot rest on the majority rules over the minority alone. Universality in societies' institutions is found via reflecting on historical progress and that the general will at present is a part of the development from history in its continuation and improvement. In terms of the general will, universality from looking at historical development can allow the participants composing the general will to determine how they fit into the scheme of being in an equal community with others, while not allowing themselves to obey an arbitrary force. The people of the general will see themselves as superior to their antecedents who have or have not done what they are doing, and judge themselves in retrospect of what has happened in the course of occurrences in the present in order to from an equal community with others that is not ruled arbitrarily.

Besides Hegel, another philosopher who differed in the Rousseauian idea of the general will was John Locke. Locke, though a social contractarian, believed that individualism was crucial for society, inspired by reading Cicero's On Duties, in which Cicero proclaimed that all people "desire preeminence and are consequently reluctant to subject themselves to others." Also, Cicero mentioned how every person is unique in a special way; therefore, people should "accept and tolerate these differences, treating all with consideration and upholding the [dignity]... of each." In addition, Locke was inspired by Cicero's idea of rationally pursuing one's self-interest, from his book On Duties. Locke wrote how people have a duty to maximize their personal good while not harming that of their neighbor. For Locke, another influence was Sir Francis Bacon. Locke started to believe, and then spread, the ideas of "freedom of thought and expression" and having "a... questioning attitude towards authority" one is under and opinions one receives because of Sir Francis Bacon.

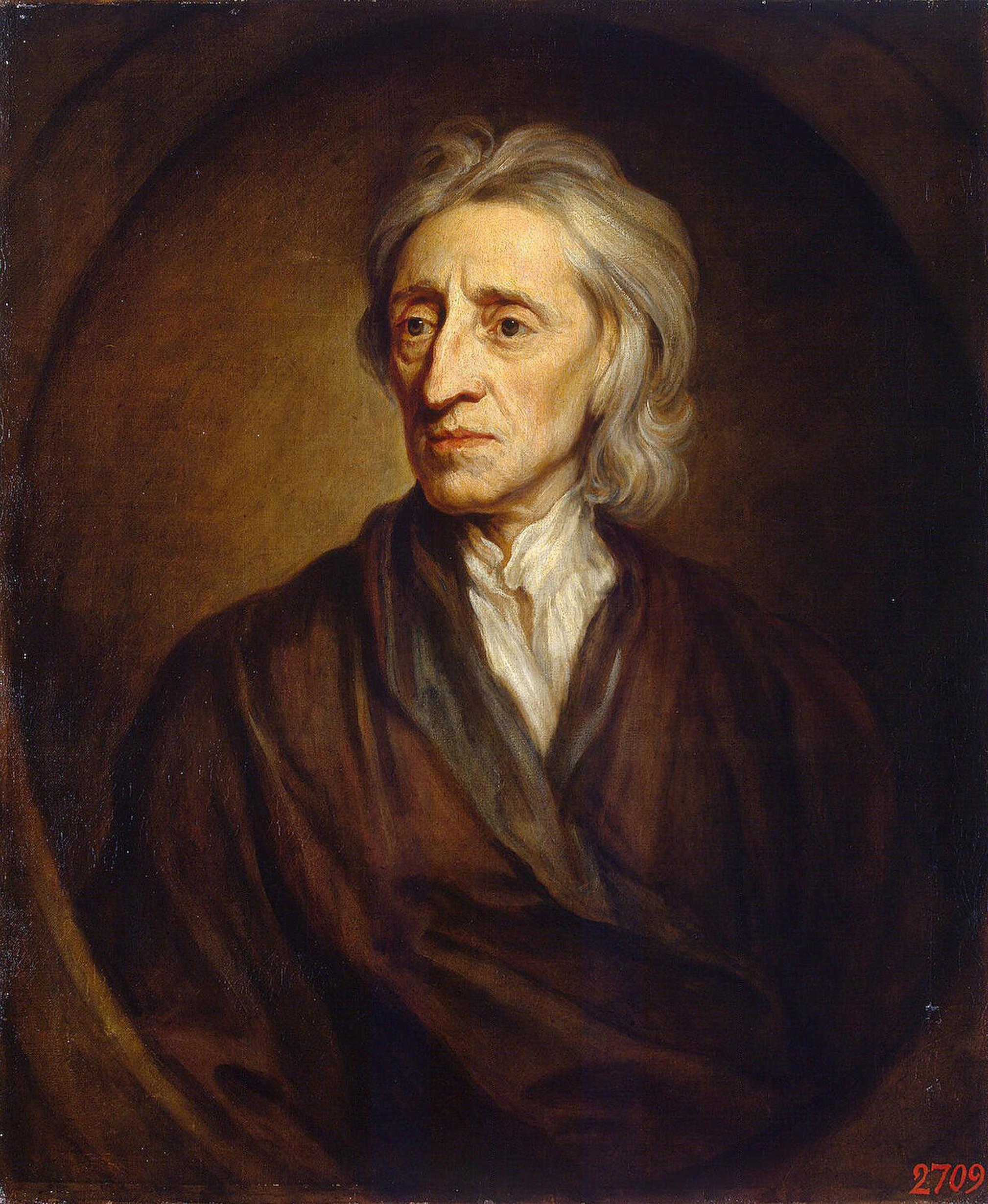
John Locke

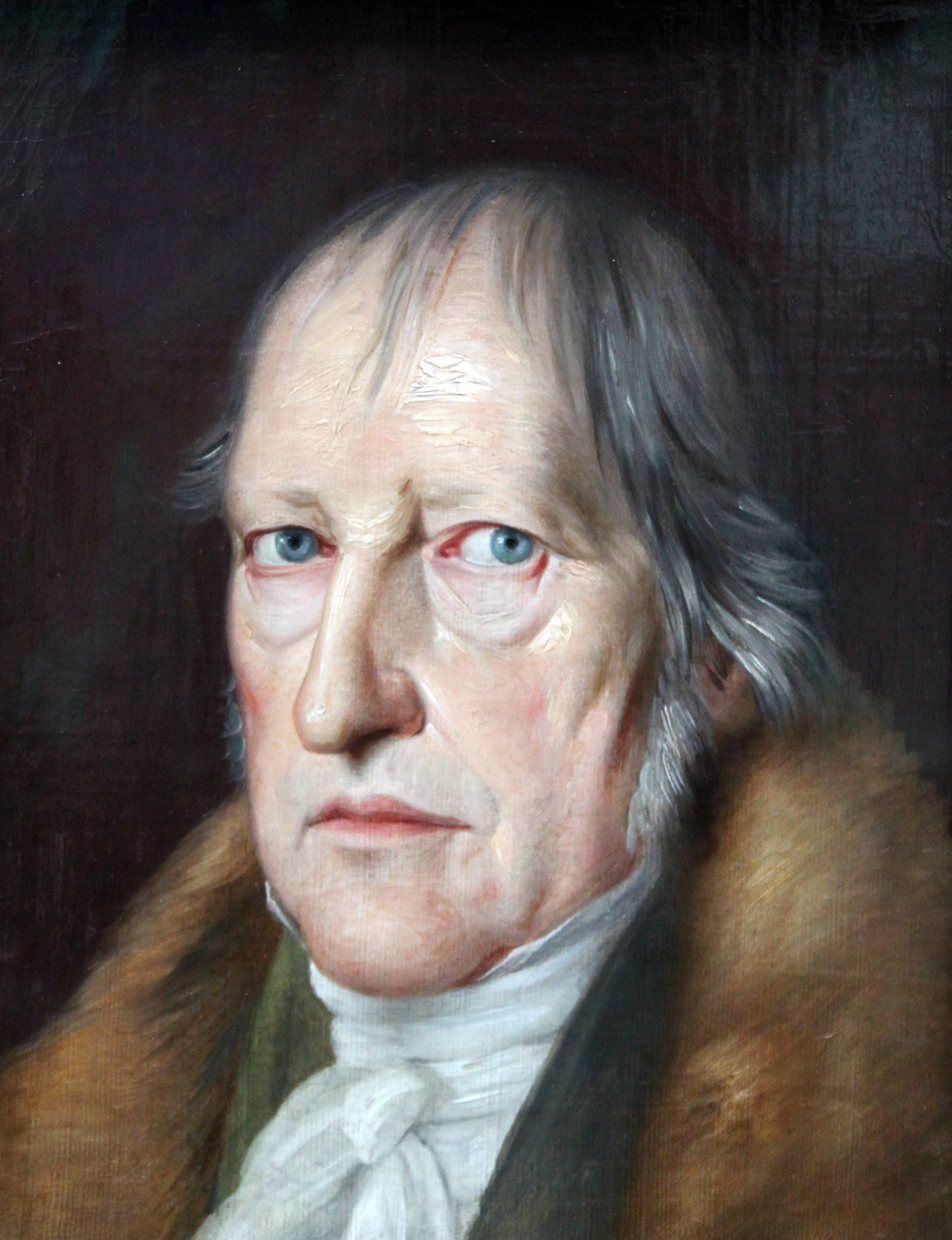
G. W. F. Hegel

Georg Wilhelm Friedrich Hegel and John Locke, two philosophers who critiqued Rousseau's concept of the general will

For Locke, land, money, and labor were important parts of his political ideas. Land was the source of all other products that people conceived as property. Because there is land, money can cause property to have a varying value, and labor starts. To Locke, labor is an extension of a person because the laborer used his body and hands in crafting the object, which him- or herself has a right to only, barring others from having the same. Nonetheless, land is not possessed by the owner one-hundred percent of the time. This is a result of a "fundamental law of nature, the preservation of society...takes precedence over self-preservation."

In Locke's Second Treatise, the purpose of government was to protect its citizens' "life, liberty, and property-- these he conceived as people's natural rights. He conceived a legislature as the top sector in power, which would be beholden to the people, that had means of enforcing against transgressors of its laws, and for law to be discretionary when it did not clarify, all for the common good. As a part of his political philosophy, Locke believed in consent for governmental rule at the individual level, similar to Rousseau, as long as it served the common good, in obedience with the law and natural law. Furthermore, Locke advocated for freedom of expression and thought and religious toleration as a result of that allowing for commerce and economy to prosper. In other words, Locke believed in the common good of society, but there are also certain natural rights that a government is bound to protect, in the course of maintaining law and order—these were the mentioned: life, liberty, and property."

== Kant ==
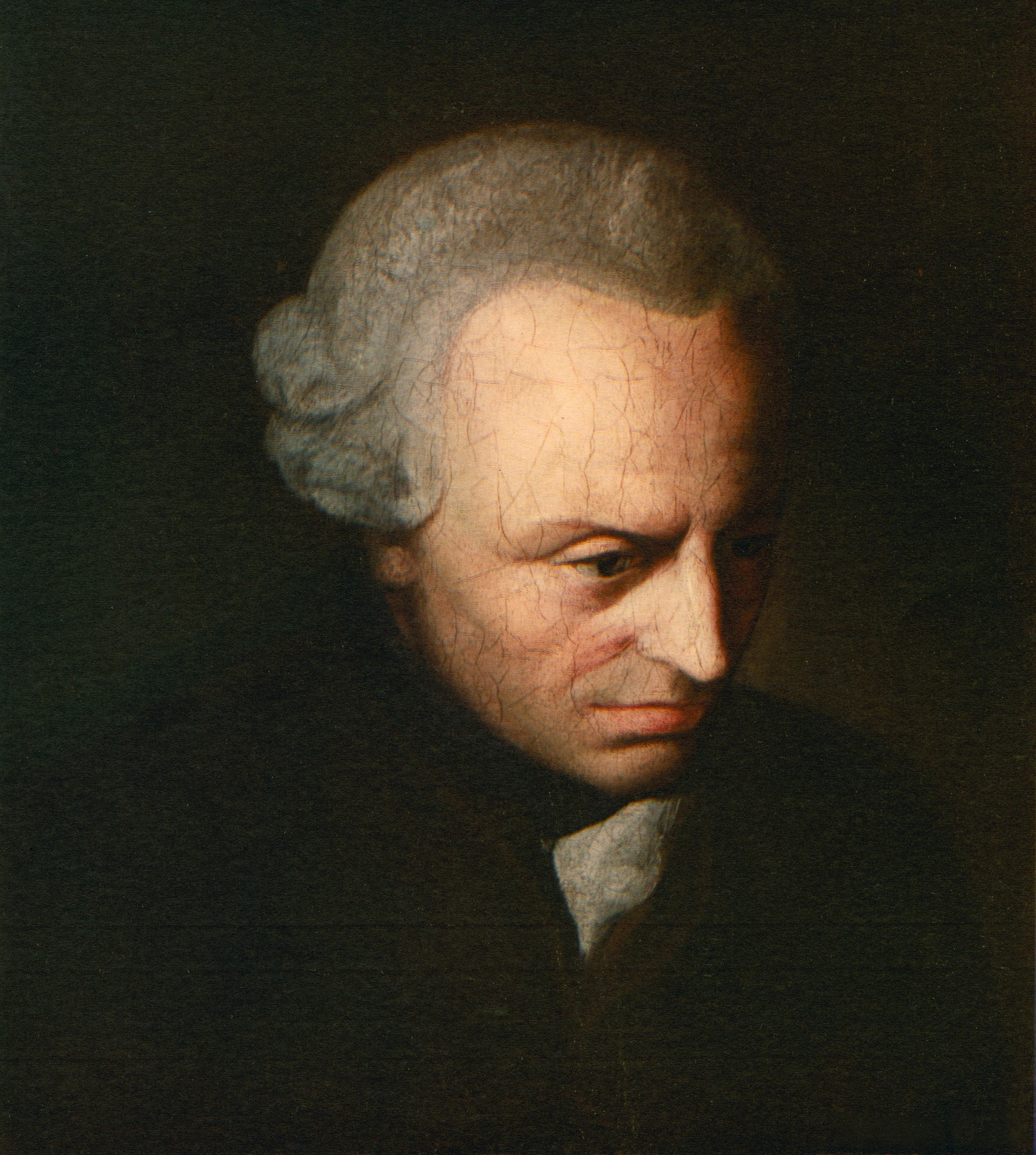
Immanuel Kant considered the will to be guided by laws and maxims

Immanuel Kant's theory of the will consists of the will being guided subjectively by maxims and objectively via laws. The former, maxims, are precepts. On the other hand, laws are objective, apprehended a priori—prior to experience. In other words, Kant's belief in the a priori proposes that the will is subject to a before-experience practical law—this is, according to Kant in the Critique of Practical Reason, when the law is seen as "valid for the will of every rational being", which is also termed as "universal laws"

Nonetheless, there is a hierarchy of what covers a person individually versus a group of people. Specifically, laws determine the will to conform to the maxims before experience is had on behalf of the subject in question. Maxims, as mentioned, only deal with what one subjectively considers.

This hierarchy exists as a result of a universal law constituted of multi-faceted parts from various individuals (people's maxims) not being feasible.

Because of the guidance by the universal law that guides maxims, an individual's will is free. Kant's theory of the will does not advocate for determinism on the ground that the laws of nature on which determinism is based prompts for an individual to have only one course of action—whatever nature's prior causes trigger an individual to do. On the other hand, Kant's categorical imperative provides "objective oughts", which exert influence over us a priori if we have the power to accept or defy them. Nonetheless, if we do not have the opportunity to decide between the right and the wrong option in regard to the universal law, in the course of which our will is free, then natural causes have led us to one decision without any alternative options.

There are some objections posited against Kant's view. For instance, in Kohl's essay "Kant on Determinism and the Categorical Imperative", there is the question about the imperfect will, if one's will compels them to obey the universal law, but not for "recognizing the law's force of reason." To this, Kant would describe the agent's will as "impotent rather than... imperfect since... the right reasons cannot [compel] her to act."

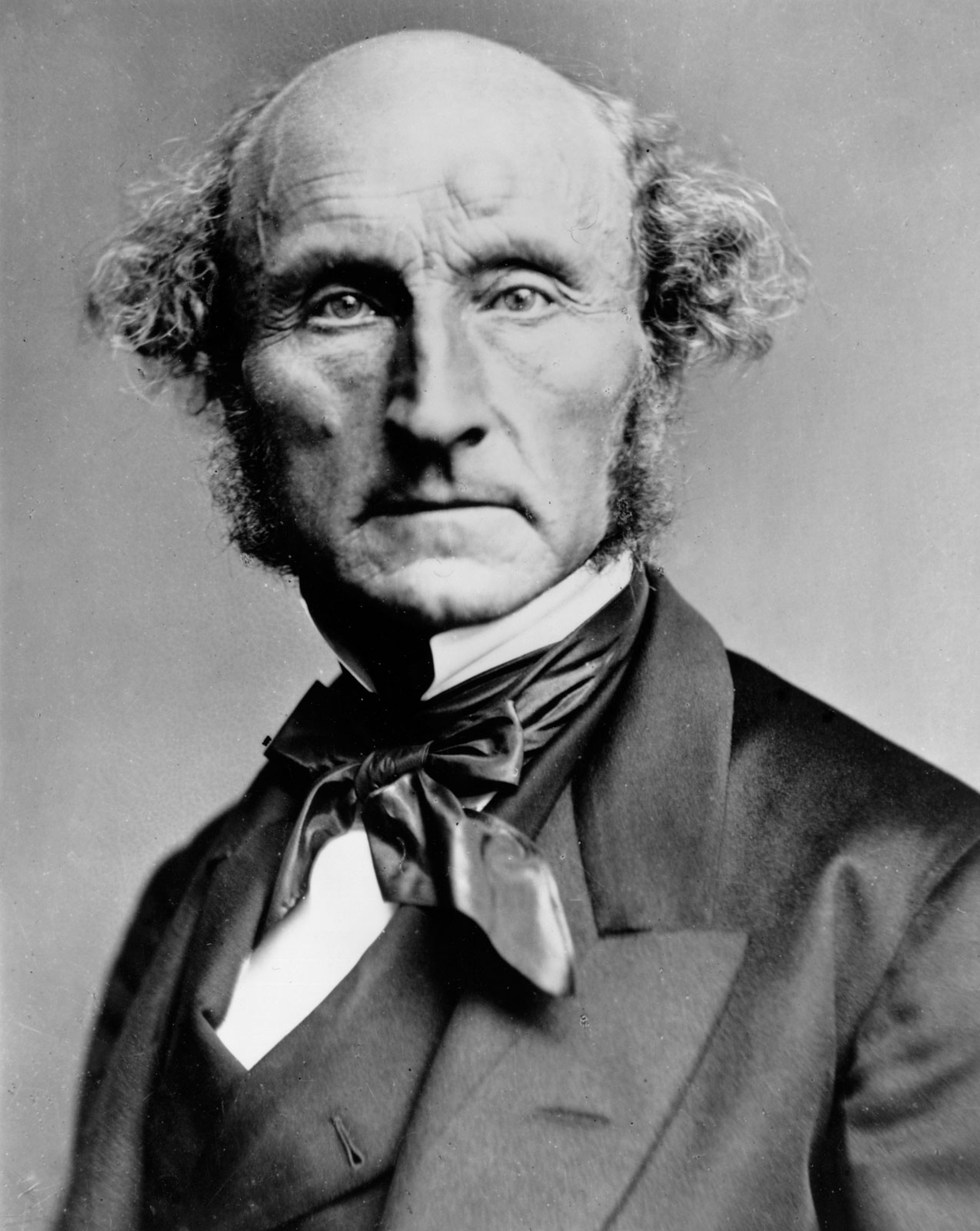
John Stuart Mill proposed a version of the will congruent with his ethics of utilitarianism

Besides the objections in Kohl's essay, John Stuart Mill had another version of the will, as written in his Utilitarianism book. John Stuart Mill, as his ethical theory runs, proposes the will operates in the same fashion, that is following the greatest happiness principle: actions are morally right as long as they advocate for happiness and morally wrong if they advocate for pain The will is demonstrated when someone executes their goals without pleasure from incentivizing their contemplation or the end of fulfilling them, and he or she continues to act according to his or her goals, even if the emotions one had felt in the beginning of fulfilling their goals has decreased over time, whether it be from changes in their personality or desires, or their goals become counterbalanced by the pains of trying to fulfill them. Also, John Stuart Mill mentioned that the process of using one's will can become unnoticeable. This is a consequence of habit making volition—the act "of choosing or determining"—second nature. Sometimes, using the will, according to Mill, becomes so habitual that it opposes any deliberate contemplation of one's options. This, he believes, is commonplace among those who have sinister, harmful habits.

Although the will can seem to become second nature because of habit, that is not always the case since the habit is changeable to the will, and the "will is [changeable] to habit." This could happen when one wills away from habit what he or she no longer desires for their self, or one could desire from willing to desire something. In the case of someone who does not have a virtuous will, Mill recommends to make that individual "desire virtue". In this, Mill means desiring virtue because of the pleasure it brings over the pain that not having it would bring, in accordance with the greatest happiness principle: actions are morally right as long as they advocate for happiness and morally wrong if they advocate for pain. Then, one has to routinely "will what is right" in order to make their will instrumental in achieving more pleasure than pain.

== Schopenhauer ==
Schopenhauer disagreed with Kant's critics and stated that it is absurd to assume that phenomena have no basis. Schopenhauer proposed that we cannot know the thing in itself as though it is a cause of phenomena. Instead, he said that we can know it by knowing our own body, which is the only thing that we can know at the same time as both a phenomenon and a thing in itself.

When we become conscious of ourselves, we realize that our essential qualities are endless urging, craving, striving, wanting, and desiring. These are characteristics of that which we call our will. Schopenhauer affirmed that we can legitimately think that all other phenomena are also essentially and basically will. According to him, will "is the innermost essence, the kernel, of every particular thing and also of the whole. It appears in every blindly acting force of nature, and also in the deliberate conduct of man...." Schopenhauer said that his predecessors mistakenly thought that the will depends on knowledge. According to him, though, the will is primary and uses knowledge in order to find an object that will satisfy its craving. That which, in us, we call will is Kant's "thing in itself", according to Schopenhauer.

Arthur Schopenhauer put the puzzle of free will and moral responsibility in these terms:

Everyone believes himself a priori to be perfectly free, even in his individual actions, and thinks that at every moment he can commence another manner of life ... But a posteriori, through experience, he finds to his astonishment that he is not free, but subjected to necessity, that in spite of all his resolutions and reflections he does not change his conduct, and that from the beginning of his life to the end of it, he must carry out the very character which he himself condemns...

In his On the Freedom of the Will, Schopenhauer stated, "You can do what you will, but in any given moment of your life you can will only one definite thing and absolutely nothing other than that one thing."

== Nietzsche ==
Friedrich Wilhelm Nietzsche was influenced by Schopenhauer when younger, but later felt him to be wrong. However, he maintained a modified focus upon will, making the term "will to power" famous as an explanation of human aims and actions.

== Psychology/psychiatry ==
Psychologists also deal with issues of will and "willpower". They investigate the ability of people to affect their will in behaviour. Some people are highly intrinsically motivated and do whatever seems best to them, while others are "weak-willed" and easily suggestible (extrinsically motivated) by society or outward inducement. Apparent failures of the will and volition have also reportedly been associated with a number of mental and neurological disorders. They also study the phenomenon of Akrasia, wherein people seemingly act against their best interests and know that they are doing so (for instance, restarting cigarette smoking after having intellectually decided to quit). Advocates of Sigmund Freud's psychology stress the importance of the influence of the unconscious mind upon the apparent conscious exercise of will. Abraham Low, a critic of psychoanalysis, stressed the importance of will, the ability to control thoughts and impulses, as fundamental for achieving mental health.

== See also ==
- Aboulia
- Akinetic mutism
- Akrasia
- Categorical imperative
- Neuroscience of free will
- Time management
- True Will
- Vīrya
- Volition (psychology)
- Voluntarism (philosophy)
- Will of God

== Bibliography ==
- Critique of Pure Reason
- The World as Will and Representation, vol. 1, Dover edition, 1966, ISBN 0-486-21761-2
