= Abraham Low =

American physician

- Born: February 28, 1891; Baranów Sandomierski, Poland
- Died: November 17, 1954 (aged 63)
- Occupation: Neuropsychiatrist

Abraham Low (1891–1954) was an American neuropsychiatrist noted for his work in establishing self-help programs for people with mental illness, and for his criticism of Freudian psychoanalysis.

== Early years ==
Low was born February 28, 1891, in Baranów Sandomierski, Poland.

Low attended grade school, high school and medical school in France from 1910 to 1918. He continued his medical education in Austria, serving in the Medical Corps of the Austrian Army. He graduated with a medical degree in 1919, after his military service, from the University of Vienna Medical School. After serving an internship in Vienna, Austria from 1919 to 1920, he immigrated to the United States, obtaining his U.S. citizenship in 1927.

== Career ==
From 1921 to 1925 he practiced medicine in both New York, New York and Chicago, Illinois. In 1925 he was appointed as an instructor of neurology at the University of Illinois College of Medicine and became an associate professor of psychiatry. In 1931 Low was appointed assistant director and in 1940 became acting director of the university's Neuropsychiatric Institute.

From 1931 to 1941 he supervised the Illinois State Hospitals. During this time he conducted demanding seminars with the staff and interviewed the patients with the most severe mental illnesses in the wards. In 1936, Low's Studies in Infant Speech and Thought was published by the University of Illinois Press.

== Death and legacy ==
Low died November 17, 1954 at the Mayo Clinic in Rochester, Minnesota. His contributions to the psychiatric and mental health communities are often not well known, but his work has and continues to assist numerous individuals in the area of mental health. The psychologist and founder of REBT, Albert Ellis, credits Low as a founder of cognitive behavioral therapy.

== Recovery International ==
In 1937, Low founded Recovery, Inc. where he served as its medical director from 1937 to 1954. During this time he presented lectures to relatives of former patients on his work with these patients and the before and after scenarios. In 1941, Recovery Inc. became an independent organization. Low's three volumes of The Technique of Self-help in Psychiatric Aftercare (including "Lectures to Relatives of Former Patients") were published by Recovery, Inc. in 1943. Recovery's main text, Mental Health Through Will-Training, was originally published in 1950. During the organization's annual meeting in June 2007, it was announced that Recovery, Inc. would thereafter be known as Recovery International.

== See also ==
- Abraham Low Self-Help Systems
