= Henry Wright =

Henry Wright may refer to:

- Henry Clarke Wright (1797–1870), American abolitionist
- Henry Wright (artist) (1849–1937), English artist and war correspondent
- Henry Wright (civil servant) (1794–1879), accountant general and controller of revenue of Ceylon, 1841–1847
- Henry Smith Wright (1839–1910), British member of parliament for Nottingham South, 1886–1895
- Henry Parks Wright (1839–1918), Yale's first college dean
- Henry W. Wright (1868–1948), American politician from California
- H. FitzHerbert Wright (1870–1947), British politician
- Henry Burt Wright (1877–1923), theology professor at Yale University, son of Henry Parks Wright, above
- Henry Wright (planner) (1878–1936), American urban planner and architect
- Henry Oswald Wright (1880–1963), rancher and political figure in Saskatchewan, Canada
- Henry Wright (footballer) (1882–1953), Australian footballer
- Henry Wright (baseball) (1906–1960), American Negro leagues baseball player
- Henry T. Wright, American anthropologist and archaeologist
- Sir Henry Wright, 1st Baronet (c. 1637–1664), member of parliament for Harwich
- Henry Wright (Massachusetts politician), early Massachusetts settler
- Henry L. Wright (1904–1999), American architect
- Henry Wright (cricketer) (1822–1893), English cricketer and umpire
- Henry Wright (priest) (died 1750), archdeacon of Kilmacduagh

== See also ==
- Harry Wright (disambiguation)
