= Harry Tiebout =

American psychiatrist

Harry M. Tiebout
- Born: 2 January 1896; Brooklyn, New York, United States
- Died: 2 April 1966 (aged 70); Greenwich, Connecticut, United States
- Education: Wesleyan University; Johns Hopkins University School of Medicine
- Known for: Promoting the Alcoholics Anonymous approach to alcoholism.
- Scientific career
- Fields: Psychiatry
- Workplaces: Blythewood Sanitarium, Greenwich, Connecticut

Harry M. Tiebout (2 January 1896 – 2 April 1966) was an American psychiatrist who promoted the Alcoholics Anonymous approach to the public, patients and fellow professionals. He served on the Board of Trustees of Alcoholics Anonymous from 1957 to 1966 and was president of the National Council on Alcoholism from 1951 to 1953.

== Early life and education ==
Harry Tiebout was raised in Brooklyn, New York. He earned his bachelor's degree at Wesleyan University in 1917, then went to Johns Hopkins University School of Medicine, where he also completed an internship with a specialization in psychiatry. The psychiatry service at Hopkins was led by Adolf Meyer, who had an eclectic approach in which Freudian theory was contributory but not dominant. John B. Watson was also at Hopkins during the time Tiebout was there, conducting research in behaviorism which had substantial influence on the field of child development during the 1920s.

== Clinical work ==
Tiebout was on the staff of New York Hospital, Westchester Division from 1922 to 1924. He began work in child guidance clinics in New York City, joining the Institute for Child Guidance as staff psychiatrist shortly after it was founded in 1927. The institute was a well-funded center for training and research, dominated by psychoanalysis and specializing in "exhaustive case histories 75 pages long." During these years Tiebout was also on the staff of Cornell Medical School and the Payne Whitney Psychiatric Clinic.

In 1935, he became medical director of Blythewood Sanitarium in Greenwich, Connecticut. Privately owned, Blythewood was situated on a beautiful, rustic 50-acre (200,000 m^{2}) estate once owned by Boss Tweed. At its peak, it had eight main buildings, eight cottages, a chapel, a building for occupational therapy, and a small golf course. There were no bars on the windows. Artistic and cultural pursuits were encouraged as part of the therapeutic program. Although the sanitarium was primarily for care of the mentally ill, it also provided care for alcoholics.

In 1939, Tiebout received a pre-publication copy of the book Alcoholics Anonymous. After looking it over, he gave it to Marty Mann, one of his patients. She had been at Blythewood for over a year but seemed no closer to conquering her alcohol problem than when she arrived, so he considered her a good test of whether the book had value. At first, she read the book eagerly, delighted to know for the first time that there was a name (alcoholism) for what ailed her. However, she was soon repelled by the overbearingly religious message and told Tiebout that she could never accept it. Tiebout, according to Mann's biographers Sally and David Brown, quietly encouraged her to keep reading. Eventually taking the book to heart, she had an epiphany during a crisis of resentment and fury.

Other references, also based on Mann's recollections, portray Tiebout's role a little differently. They describe an ongoing verbal battle lasting several months, in which Tiebout refused to accept Marty's rejection of the book. In the end, Mann did become an active member of AA and within a few years made education about alcoholism, and promotion of alcohol-abuse treatment, her second career. With Tiebout's support, she founded the National Council on Alcoholism (NCA).

Tiebout also became a friend and supporter of AA founder Bill Wilson, providing personal psychiatric care when Wilson developed depression in the 1940s. It was largely through Tiebout's influence that Wilson was invited to speak at a New York state medical society meeting and then at a meeting of the American Psychiatric Association, and had his talk published in the American Journal of Psychiatry.

== Alcoholism: Approach to the patient ==
Tiebout had many years of training and experience in the management of alcohol problems before his first exposure to Alcoholics Anonymous. However, his earliest detailed article concerning alcoholism was published in 1944, 5 years into his relationship with AA, and is primarily a description of AA itself. Over the next 10 years, he published a number of articles outlining his theories about alcoholism, the psychodynamic causes of the disorder and his reasons for endorsing AA as the definitive solution.

Howard J. Clinebell, in a book for clergy on alcoholism counseling, recalled that Tiebout "likened the 'runaway symptom' of alcoholism to the dangerously high fever of pneumonia. The fever is a symptom of the underlying infection, but unless it can be lowered, the person may die of the 'symptom"." Psychiatrists, Tiebout felt, had been ineffectual because they ignored the deadly symptom in an attempt to treat a (theoretical) underlying disease. He credited AA with an ability to target the symptom directly. Tiebout's understanding of the alcoholic mind cannot be entirely separated from his understanding of the 12-step approach, but the primary themes in his writings can be summed up under several points.

=== The alcoholic personality ===
In one of his early papers Tiebout discounted the idea, common among psychoanalytically inclined doctors, that there was a classic type of pre-alcoholic personality. In his view, all of the personality characteristics associated with early alcoholism were manifestations of the tension state accompanying intermittent alcohol binges. These features included:

1. An unconscious need or drive to dominate
2. A prevailing negative, hostile feeling-tone
3. A capacity for ecstatic peaks
4. A sense of loneliness and isolation
5. Feelings of inferiority and superiority that exist simultaneously in the individual
6. A striving for perfection

Howard Clinebell understood Tiebout to mean that there was, in fact, a pre-alcoholic personality but that "the distinctive factors have not yet been isolated". In a 1947 lecture, Tiebout located the roots of alcoholism in poor parenting, either excessive strictness which caused the child to suffer "perpetual frustration and blocking of his desires and expectations," or over-indulgence. Either way, "Since the alcoholic's sense of self-discipline has not been developed at this point, his natural reaction is to reject all discipline. He now cannot face the realities of his existence. This would indicate that the whole point of treatment is to get the alcoholic to face and accept his limitations and capacities."

=== The disease model ===
The concept of alcoholism that dominated treatment approaches in the second half of the 20th century, and is still influential today, defined alcoholism as a disease. The idea that alcohol problems constituted a disease was not new, but the particular synthesis associated initially with the Yale Center of Alcohol Studies (now at Rutgers) and the National Committee for Education on Alcoholism had unique features not found in earlier theories. The NCEA was one of Marty Mann's projects, and thus influenced by Tiebout. A 1990 Hazelden pamphlet cites Tiebout, Dr. William Silkworth and E.M. Jellinek as formative influences.

Tiebout seems to have been somewhat ambivalent about the disease model, however. In 1955, speaking of the scientific underpinnings of the alcoholism movement in general, he said "I cannot help but feel that the whole field of alcoholism is way out on a limb which any minute will crack and drop us all in a frightful mess." He was consistent in his belief that the acceptance of alcoholism as a disease was essential, but this belief was partially pragmatic. In his experience, chronic alcoholics did not take the steps necessary to recover unless they became conscious of themselves as people with a disease. He emphasized a different aspect of the model in public lectures, however. Family members, friends and employers of alcoholics were encouraged to keep in mind that the condition was an illness and not a moral failing.

=== Role of the ego ===
In a 1954 article, Tiebout introduced a definition of the term "ego" which was to become important in his later writings, particularly those for AA audiences. Although his use of the term was new, the concept behind it had been developed by Tiebout during the early 1940s. In these early articles, he was addressing a professional readership, and use of the term might have created confusion between the psychoanalytic meaning of ego and the colloquial "ego" which was Tiebout's essential meaning.

Based on work with 250 alcoholics during his first 10 years at Blythewood, Tiebout developed the following conception of the alcoholic mind:

In the normal individual there is a tendency to create some privacy for his inner life, for his motivations, reflections and emotions, so that they are not completely accessible to the environment. Normally this attempt interferes only slightly with the freedom of movement of outgoing and incoming stimuli and impulses. The boundary which the normal individual sets up between himself and the environment may be called a floating or diffuse boundary. In incipient alcoholism, however, it appears that the boundary is drawn somewhat tighter than is usual, and that with each stage of further development of the alcoholism more and more gaps are closed until the alcoholic seems to have erected what may be called a barrier which permits only a minimum of interplay between the inner self and the environment.

Using examples from dreams of patients he had analyzed, Tiebout presented evidence for the existence of this rigid barrier. As long as the barrier remained, "As long as the self feels protected in a deep unconscious sense, it cannot be and is not disturbed by the warnings of reality, which characteristically roll like water off a duck's back." For the analyst,

Tactics are governed not only by strategy; they are also guided by three basic principles in technique. These are, briefly, that the patient must suffer or feel anxiety about himself and his condition; second, that it is the impersonal pressures of reality which activate suffering; and third, that it is the first and most immediate task of the psychiatrist to overcome the patient's refusal, unwillingness or inability to sense or feel these pressures of reality.

In his 1954 article "The Ego Factors in Surrender in Alcoholism", Tiebout began using the term "ego" to describe this concept of a self barricaded by defenses. He related it to Freud's "His Majesty the Baby" and to a similar concept introduced by Sandor Rado in 1933. Rado hypothesized that the elation induced by alcohol produced a reaction in the form of a "tense depression", which then reactivated the childish megalomania normally outgrown by adulthood. The result was a type of magical thinking in which "the ego secretly compares its current helplessness with its original narcissistic stature...and aspires to leave its tribulations and regain its old magnitude." Tiebout acknowledged his indebtedness to Rado's conception, while eliminating much of the psychoanalytic complexity of the original. He also felt that Rado was incorrect in advising only the "reduction" of the ego. Tiebout's view was that "reduction" represented a compromise and that there should be no compromise with the ego. The old ego should be eliminated and replaced with a new one through "surrender".

=== Surrender and conversion ===
The hallmark of Tiebout's work was his ability to explain 12 step ideas in psychoanalytic terms. The primary source for the steps was a religious movement popularized by Frank Buchman, with elements of the Higher Life movement tradition combined with the personal-evangelism techniques developed within the YMCA movement in the early 20th century. The Oxford Group had a successful program involving public and private meetings for witness and confession, as well as individual work. Their concept of "surrender" was the traditional Christian one, as a contemporary observer noted:

Surrender means the complete surrender of the will to Christ. They make no claim that this is easy. It may mean an entire change in one's whole life plan. It has meant just that for many of the Groupers. But it is necessary. So long as there are reserved areas in a man's life, they assert, he cannot expect to enter into a wholly satisfying experience of God.

Conversion, surrender, confession, restitution and the necessity of evangelizing others were ideas brought from the Oxford Group to Alcoholics Anonymous by members who had found that the intense religious devotion they inspired was the key to a changed life. Tiebout understood the concepts in a more secular way, and approved of them.

Tiebout had found that superficial compliance in therapy often correlated with lack of real change, and he saw in the AA concept of surrender an antidote to this phenomenon. An act of surrender was the only cure, or practically the only one, to the problem of "compliance", or partial surrender to the psychiatrist's authority and the authority of the reality principle. Tiebout described true surrender as "an unconscious event, not willed by the patient even if he or she should desire to do so. It can occur only when an individual with certain traits in his or her unconscious mind becomes involved in a certain set of circumstances," essentially the circumstances of "hitting bottom".

Conversion, for Tiebout, was a spiritual awakening made possible by the person's recognition of his own egocentricity. The central effect of Alcoholics Anonymous was "to develop in the person a spiritual state which will serve as a direct neutralizing force upon the egocentric elements in the character of the alcoholic." A "vague, groping, skeptical intellectual belief" would not accomplish this but only a true emotional religious feeling, for "unless the individual attains in the course of time a sense of the reality and the nearness of a Greater Power, his egocentric nature will reassert itself with undiminished intensity, and drinking will again enter into the picture."

== Later life ==
Tiebout retired as medical director of Blythewood in 1950. The sanitarium gradually changed into a long-term care facility for the elderly, with fewer psychiatric patients. He continued to see patients privately, maintained an active speaking schedule, and served on the boards of various alcohol-related organizations. He died in Greenwich in 1966 of cardiac causes. He was the husband of the former Ethel Mills and father of Harry Tiebout, Jr., a philosophy professor; Charles Tiebout, an economics professor; and Sarah T. Worn.
