= Harold Wright =

Harold Wright may refer to:

- Harold Madison Wright (1908–1997), Canadian engineer and athlete
- Harold Wright (clarinetist) (1926–1993), American clarinetist
- Harold Bell Wright (1872–1944), American writer
- Harold Wright (greyhound trainer) (1884–1974)
- Harold Wright (English cricketer) (1884–1915), English cricketer
- Harold Wright (South African cricketer) (1921–2006)
- Harold Wright (politician) (born 1947), American politician in the Oklahoma House of Representatives
- Harold Louis Wright (1929–1978), American prelate
- Harry Wright (footballer, born 1900) (Harold Wright, 1900–?), English footballer best known for playing for Gillingham
- Harry Wright (footballer, born 1909) (Harold Edward Wright, 1909–1994), English football coach
- Harry Wright (RAAF officer) (Harold John Alfred Wright, 1919–1991), Australian air force officer and activist

== See also ==
- Harry Wright (disambiguation)
