= Tournier =

Tournier, Torner, Tourné and Torné are names that refer to the trade of turning (Latin tornator), but could also be designated to the guardian of a tower, a jailer (old French Tornier). Le Turnier is a name that could be met in the Morbihan. Tournier seems to be a variant of the job of a turning.

Tournier is a surname, and may refer to:

- Henri Tournier (1834–1904), Swiss entomologist
- Lionel Tournier, French curler
- Marcel Tournier (1879–1951), French harpist, composer, and pedagogue
- Mark Tournier (born 1971), Australian cricketer
- Michel Tournier (1924–2016), French writer
- Mike Tournier (born 1963), English electronic musician
- Nicolas Tournier (1590–1639), French Baroque painter
- Paul Tournier (1898–1986), Swiss physician and author
- Walter Tournier (born 1944), Uruguayan director
