= Harry Wright (disambiguation) =

Harry Wright (1835–1895) was an English-born American baseball player, manager and developer.

Harry Wright may also refer to:

- Harry Wright (footballer, born 1888) (1888–1950), English footballer best known for playing for West Bromwich Albion
- Harry Wright (footballer, born 1900) (1900–?), English footballer best known for playing for Gillingham
- Harry Wright (Australian footballer) (1870–1950), Australian rules footballer
- Harry Wright (footballer, born 1909) (1909–1994), English football coach
- Harry Wright (Canadian politician) (1875–1960), politician in British Columbia, Canada
- Harry Wright (Queensland politician) (1890–1963), member of the Queensland Legislative Assembly
- Harry N. Wright (1881–1969), president of the City College of New York
- Harry Wright (American football) (1919–1993), American football player and coach
- Harry Wright (RAAF officer) (1919–1991), Australian air force officer and activist

== See also ==
- Henry Wright (disambiguation)
- Harold Wright (disambiguation)
