= Abase =

Abase may refer to:

- Self-abasement
- Amira Abase, Shamima Begum and Kadiza Sultana
