= Robert Elliott Speer =

American Presbyterian religious leader and missionary

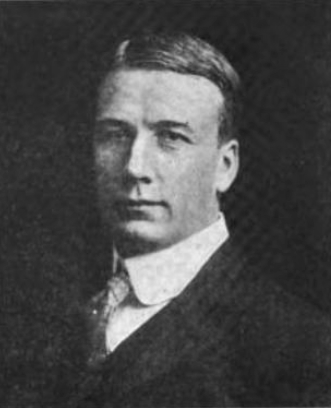
- Born: September 10, 1867; Huntingdon, Pennsylvania, U.S.
- Died: November 23, 1947 (aged 80); Lower Merion Township, Pennsylvania, U.S.

Robert Elliott Speer (September 10, 1867 – November 23, 1947) was an American Presbyterian religious leader and an authority on missions.

== Biography ==
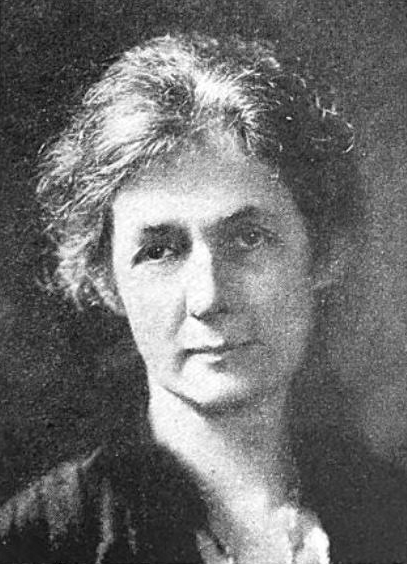
Emma Doll Bailey

He was born at Huntingdon, Pennsylvania on September 10, 1867. He graduated from Phillips Academy in 1886 and from Princeton in 1889, and studied at Princeton Theological Seminary in 1890–1891.

He became active as an itinerant recruiter for the Student Volunteer Movement (SVM) from 1889 to 1890.

In 1891, he was appointed secretary of the American Presbyterian Mission. He visited missions in Persia, India, China, Korea, and Japan in 1896–1897, and in South America in 1909 and later made similar tours. In Princeton he was greatly influenced by Arthur Tappan Pierson. Under his leadership, the foreign missions of the Presbyterian church became remarkably successful. Speer was specifically noted as being "obsessed" with Persia. He retired in 1937.

He married Emma Doll Bailey in 1893 and, together, they had five children, one of whom, Elliot Speer (1898–1934), became headmaster of Northfield Mount Hermon School, where he was murdered in his home on campus, on September 14, 1934. Their daughter Margaret Bailey Speer (1900–1997) was dean of Yenching Women's College in China in the 1930s, and headmistress of the Shipley School from 1944 to 1965.

He died on November 3, 1947, in Lower Merion Township, Pennsylvania.

== Theology ==
Although he published two articles in The Fundamentals, some have called him liberal because he sided with the Presbyterian Church (USA) and opposed John Gresham Machen during the anti-liberal/modernist controversies of the 1930s. Speer affirmed traditional Christian doctrines such as the historical accuracy of the Bible, the Virgin Birth, and the Resurrection of Christ, yet also embraced a social vision of Christianity which placed him closer to theological liberals than some conservatives would tolerate. He is quoted to have said that Karl Barth offered "an essential recovery of aspects of truth which will not so easily be lost again."

== Influence ==
Speer wrote numerous sermons, articles, pamphlets, and books among which are biographies, biblical commentaries and books on Christian living. Most deal with missionary principles and practices but some tackle controversial social problems. He coined the famous four principles of Jesus which became embedded in Moral Rearmament and in Alcoholics Anonymous as the "Four Absolutes" or the "Four Standards". Basing his views on his own biblical research, Speer regarded these four principles as one of Jesus' key teachings: Purity, Honesty, Unselfishness and Love. While the initiator of Moral Rearmament, Dr Frank Buchman, held Robert E. Speer in high regard, he used a version of the four principles which had been reworked by Pr Henry Burt Wright from Yale.

== Publications ==
- The Man Christ Jesus (1896)
- A Memorial of a True Life: Biography of H. M. Beaver (1898)
- The Man Paul (1900)
- Presbyterian Foreign Missions (1901)
- Christ and Life (1901)
- Missionary Principles and Practice (1902)
- The Principles of Jesus: applied to some questions of today (1902)
- A Memorial of Horace Tracy Pitkin (1903)
- A Young Man's Questions (1903)
- Missions and Modern History (two volumes, 1904) vol. 1, vol. 2
- Young Men Who Overcame (1905)
- The Marks of a Man (1907)
- The Master of the Heart (1908)
- The Deity of Christ (1909)
- Christianity and the Nations (1910)
- The Light of the World (1911)
- South American Problems (1912)
- Men Who Were Found Faithful (1912)
- Studies of Missionary Leadership (1914)
- John's Gospel (1915)
- The Stuff of Manhood (1917)
- The Christian Man the Church and the War (1918)
- The Gospel and the New World (1919)
- A Missionary Pioneer in the Far East (1922)
- Of One Blood (1924)
- Seeking the Mind of Christ (1926)
- The Unity of the Americas (1926)
- Some Living Issues (1930)
- The Finality of Jesus Christ (1933)
- Five Minutes a Day (1943)
- George Bowen of Bombay (1938)

== See also ==
- History of religion in the United States
- Protestant missions in China
- List of Protestant missionaries in China
- Christianity in China
- Robert Elliott Speer Manuscript Collection at Princeton Theological Seminary

== Notes ==
Religious titles
Preceded by The Rev. William Oxley Thompson	Moderator of the 139th General Assembly of the Presbyterian Church in the United States of America; 1927–1928	Succeeded by The Rev. Hugh Kelso Walker
