= Arne Fjellbu =

Norwegian bishop

Right Reverend Arne Fjellbu
- Bishop
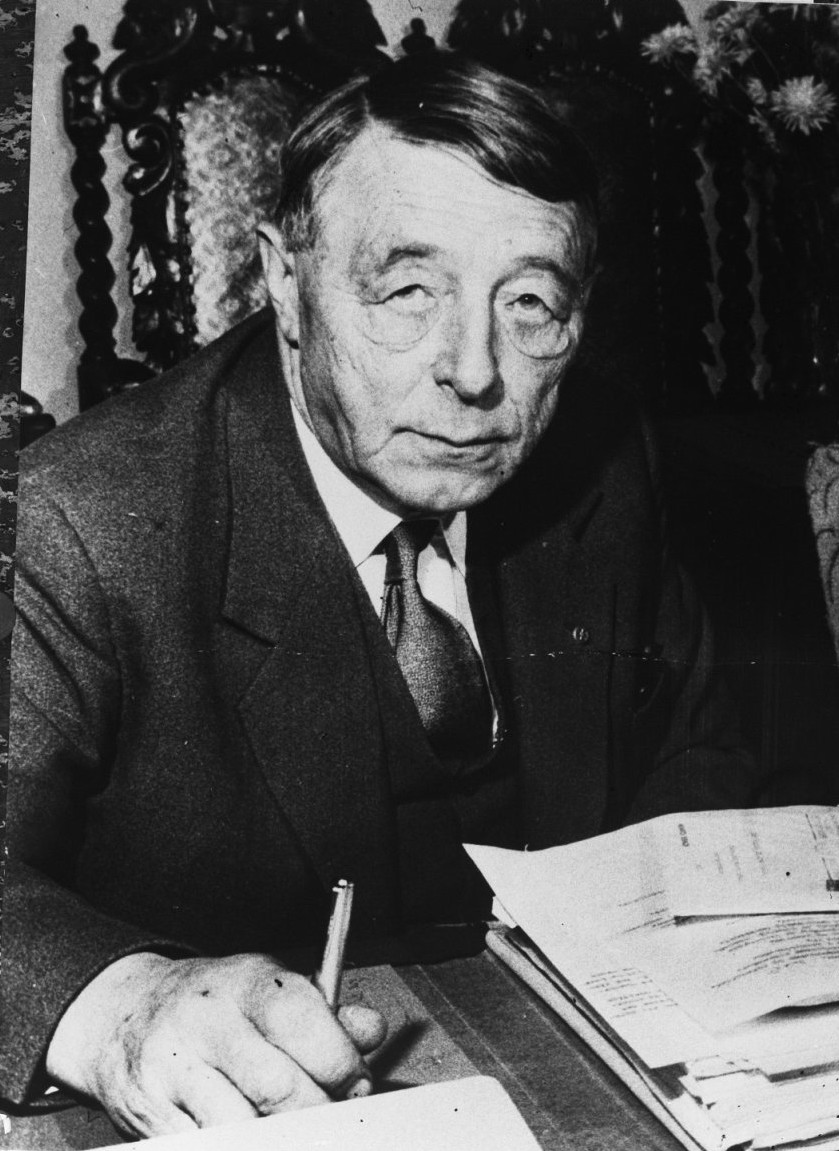
- Arne Fjellbu (1960)
- Church: Church of Norway
- Diocese: Nidaros

Personal details
- Born: 19 December 1890 Decorah, Iowa, United States
- Died: 9 October 1962 (aged 71) Trondheim, Norway
- Denomination: Christian
- Parents: Karl Anton Fjellbu; Ellen Johanne Retvedt
- Spouse: Karen Christie (1918-1962)
- Occupation: Priest
- Education: Royal Frederick University (cand.theol. 1914)

Arne Fjellbu (19 December 1890 – 9 October 1962) was a Norwegian bishop. During World War II, he played a central role in the Church's resistance against the Nazi authorities. He was bishop of the Diocese of Nidaros from 1945 to 1960.

== Early life and career ==
He was born in Decorah, Iowa in the United States as a son of vicar Karl Anton Fjellbu (1865–1933) and his wife Ellen Johanne Retvedt (1865–1941). In 1900, the family moved from the Red River Valley to Norway. He took his examen artium at Kristiansand Cathedral School in 1909. He then graduated from the Royal Frederick University with the cand.theol. degree in 1914, completed the practical-theological seminary and was ordained in 1916. In October 1918 he married Karen Christie (1892–1965). He was a priest in Berlin from 1916 to 1917, acting vicar in Borge from 1919-1921, and auxiliary priest in the Nidaros Cathedral from 1921-1927. He was promoted to curate in 1927 and dean in 1937.

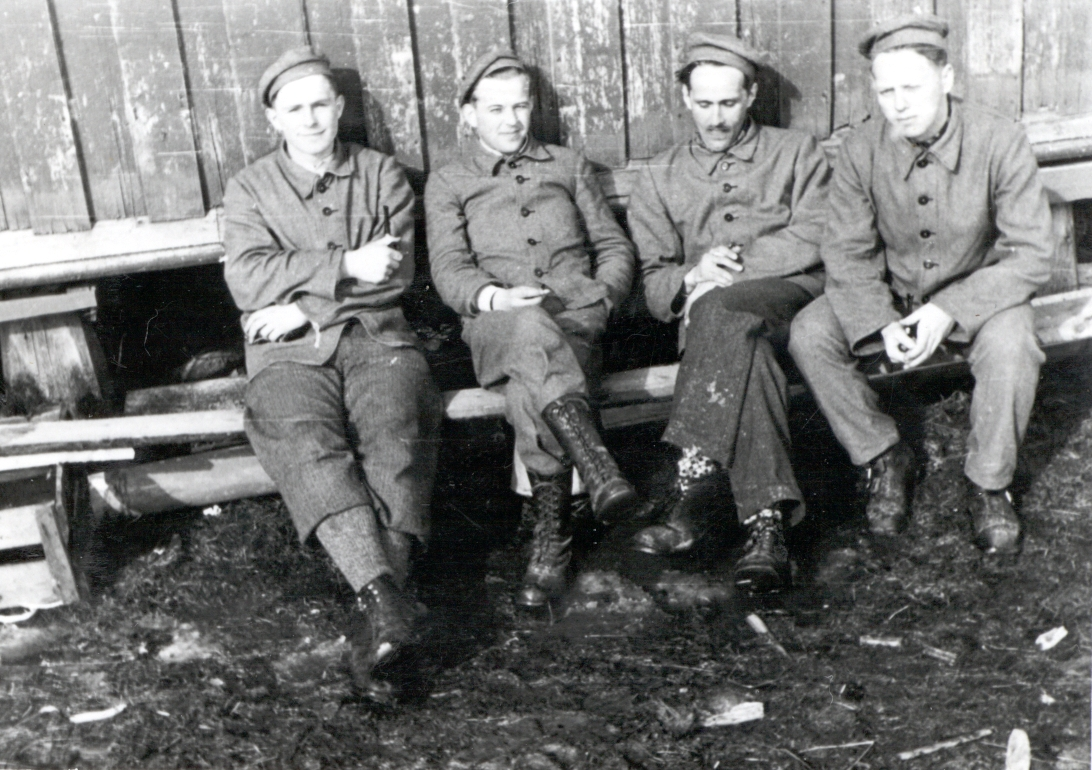
Fjellbu's son Arne (furthest to the left) with a group of fellow prisoners at Falstad in 1942

== Later career ==
In April 1940 the occupation of Norway by Nazi Germany started, supported by the Norwegian political party Nasjonal Samling. Fjellbu was anti-Nasjonal Samling already in 1940, but continued in his job. On 1 February 1942, however, the authorities demanded that Nazi priest P. Blessing-Dahle preside over the church ceremony to celebrate the inauguration (Norwegian: statsakten) of the Quisling regime. Fjellbu then held an alternative ceremony later the same day, and for that he was fired on 19 February. As a result, all bishops in the Church of Norway stepped down in protest against the Nazi regime on 24 February 1942. Fjellbu had a son, also named Arne (born 1921), who was imprisoned in Falstad concentration camp from 9 March to 9 June 1942. Fjellbu attributed the cohesion of the Church of Norway in its confrontation against Nazism to the campaign led by Frank Buchman and the Oxford Group in Norway from 1934 onwards.

Fjellbu was expelled from the Diocese of Nidaros on 1 May 1942, and moved to Hølen before being expelled to Andøya in June 1943. He was coerced from Andøya to Lillehammer in the summer of 1944, but fled to Sweden the same autumn. In December 1944, Fjellbu was appointed Bishop of the liberated parts of Northern Norway by the Norwegian government-in-exile. He arrived in Kirkenes on 12 January 1945 and visited the burned-down cities of Vadsø and Vardø as well as other settlements. He stayed in Finnmark until late March, when he was called to London to speak at a memorial sermon in Westminster Abbey on 9 April. He returned from the United Kingdom to Stockholm by plane on 1 May 1945, heading for Finnmark, but due to the events instead travelled to Trondheim by train, arriving on 9 May, and conducting a sermon in a crowded Nidaros Cathedral the following day. A day after Germany's loss in the war, Fjellbu became "Acting Bishop" of Nidaros, and in November 1945 he got the position formally. He was inaugurated on 13 January 1946. During the war years, Fjellbu documented events in a secret diary, parts of which were published as Minner fra krigsårene in 1945.

Fjellbu remained a bishop until his retirement in 1960. He was a co-founder of the World Council of Churches in 1948, and was a member of its executive committee in 1953. He was also involved in the Lutheran World Federation. He wrote several books, and a Festschrift to him was issued on his seventieth birthday. He held honorary degrees from Lund University and the University of St Andrews, was a member of the Royal Norwegian Society of Sciences and Letters and an honorary member of the British and Foreign Bible Society, the International Mark Twain Society, and Pro Fide et Christianismo. He was appointed as a Commander With Star of the Royal Norwegian Order of St. Olav in 1958, and also as a Commander of the Danish Order of the Dannebrog. He died in October 1962 in Trondheim.

Church of Norway titles
Preceded by Johan Nicolai Støren (Vacant from 1942-1945 due to the Nazi occupation)	Acting Bishop of Nidaros; May 1945–1946	Succeeded by Tord Godal
Preceded by Johan Nicolai Støren (Vacant from 1942-1945 due to the Nazi occupation)	Bishop of Nidaros; 1946–1960	Succeeded by Tord Godal
