= Oxford Group =

Christian organization

The Oxford Group was a Christian organization founded by American Lutheran minister Frank Buchman in 1921, originally under the name First Century Christian Fellowship. Buchman believed that fear and selfishness were the root of all problems. He also believed that the solution to living without fear and selfishness was to "surrender one's life over to God's plan". It featured surrender to Jesus Christ by sharing with others how lives had been changed in the pursuit of four moral absolutes: honesty, purity, unselfishness, and love.

Buchman said that he had a spiritual experience at a chapel in Keswick, Cumbria, England, when he attended a decisive sermon by Jessie Penn-Lewis in the course of the 1908 Keswick Convention. He resigned a part-time post at Hartford Seminary in 1921 to found a movement called the Moral Re-Armament (MRA) movement. By 1928, the Fellowship had come to be known as The Oxford Group or Oxford Groups.

The Oxford Group enjoyed wide popularity and success in the 1930s. In 1932, Archbishop of Canterbury Cosmo Lang said, "There is a gift here of which the church is manifestly in need." Buchman encouraged participants in his group to continue as members of their own churches.

Two years later, Archbishop of York William Temple paid tribute to The Oxford Groups "which are being used to demonstrate the power of God to change lives and give to personal witness its place in true discipleship". As a Protestant movement, it was criticized by some Roman Catholic authorities, yet praised by others.

The tenets and practices of an American Oxford Group greatly influenced the steps of Alcoholics Anonymous. Ebby Thacher’s sobriety led to Bill Wilson's victory over alcoholism. Wilson's efforts to carry the "spiritual solution" of the Group to suffering alcoholics led to Dr. Bob’s sobriety in 1935. Bill Wilson and Dr. Bob shortly after founded Alcoholics Anonymous (AA).

In 1938, Buchman proclaimed a need for "moral re-armament" and that expression became the Oxford Groups movement's new name. Buchman headed the Moral Re-Armament for 23 years until his retirement in 1961. In 2001 the movement was renamed Initiatives of Change.

== Frank Buchman ==
Frank Buchman, originally a Lutheran, was deeply influenced by the Higher Life movement whose strongest contribution to evangelism in Britain was the Keswick Convention.

Buchman had studied at Muhlenberg College in Allentown, Pennsylvania and at the Lutheran Theological Seminary at Philadelphia and was ordained a Lutheran minister in June 1902. Having hoped to be called to an important city church, he accepted a call to Overbrook, a growing Philadelphia suburb, which did not yet have a Lutheran church building. He arranged the rental of an old storefront for worship space, and lived upstairs.

After a visit to Europe, he decided to establish a hostel for mentally disabled in Overbrook, along the lines of Friedrich von Bodelschwingh’s colony for the mentally ill in Bielefeld, Germany, and inspired by Toynbee Hall charitable institution in East London.

Conflict developed with the hospice's board. In Buchman's recollection the dispute was due to the board's "unwillingness" to fund the hospice adequately. However, the Finance Committee of the Lutheran church body of Pennsylvania, aka Pennsylvania Ministerium, which oversaw the budget, had no funds with which to make up an ongoing deficit and wanted the hospice to be self-supporting. Buchman resigned.

Exhausted and depressed, Buchman took his doctor's advice of a long holiday abroad, and this is how, still in turmoil over his resignation, Buchman attended the Keswick Convention in 1908, hoping to meet pastor F. B. Meyer, one of the leading lights of the Keswick Convention and one of the main advocates of Quiet Time as a means to be "inspired by God".

F. B. Meyer was not present, and Frank Buchman chose to attend the sermon by Jessie Penn-Lewis instead, which became "a life-changing experience" for him

"I thought of those six men back in Philadelphia (the hospice's board) who I felt had wronged me. They probably had, but I'd got so mixed up in the wrong that I was the seventh wrong man.... I began to see myself as God saw me, which was a very different picture than the one I had of myself. I don't know how to explain it, I can only tell you I sat there and realized how my sin, my pride, my selfishness and my ill-will had eclipsed me from God in Christ.... I was the center of my own life. Not Him. That big 'I' had to be crossed out. I saw my resentments against those men standing out like tombstones in my heart. I asked God to change me and He told me to put things right with them. It produced in me a vibrant feeling, as though a strong current of life had suddenly been poured into me and afterwards a dazed sense of a great spiritual shaking-up."

Buchman wrote letters of apology to the six board members asking their forgiveness for harboring ill will. Buchman regarded this as a foundation experience and in later years frequently referred to it with his followers.

F. B. Meyer and the Keswick Convention's influence on Buchman was a major one. Meyer had published The Secret of Guidance in 1896. One of his mottos was: "Let no day pass without its season of silent waiting before God." Meyer personally coached Buchman into "daily guidance".

The theology of the Keswick Convention at the time was that of the Holiness movement with its idea, originally derived from Methodism, of the second work of grace which would allow "entire sanctification": Christians living "in close union with Christ" could remain "free from sin" through the Holy Spirit. That is where Buchman's assertion (bizarre to many Lutheran or Reformed ears) that "human nature can change" originates. Another assertion was "Absolute moral standards belong by Holiness", even though this formula used by Buchman had been formulated by the American Presbyterian missionary Robert Elliott Speer.

From 1909 to 1915, Buchman was YMCA secretary at Pennsylvania State University. Despite quickly more than doubling the YMCA membership to 75% of the student body, he was dissatisfied, questioning how deep the changes went. Alcohol consumption in the college, for example, was unaffected. During this time he began the practice of a daily "quiet time".

Buchman finally got to meet Frederick Brotherton Meyer, who when visiting the college, asked Buchman, "Do you let the Holy Spirit guide you in all you are doing?" Buchman replied that he did indeed pray and read the Bible in the morning. "But," persisted Meyer, "do you give God enough uninterrupted time really to tell you what to do?"

Another decisive influence appears to have been Yale University theology professor Henry Burt Wright (1877–1923) and his 1909 book The Will of God and a Man's Lifework, which was itself influenced by Frederick Brotherton Meyer and Henry Drummond, among others.

Frank Buchman was also very influenced by Presbyterian Yale theology professor Henry Burt Wright (see The Four Absolutes infra).

Buchman's devotion to "personal evangelism", and his skill at re-framing the Christian message in contemporary terms, were admired by campus ministry leaders. Maxwell Chaplin, YMCA secretary at Princeton University, wrote, after attending one of the Buchman's annual "YMCA Week" campaigns: "In five years the permanent YMCA secretary at Penn State has entirely changed the tone of that one-time tough college."

Lloyd Douglas, author of The Robe took part in the same campaign. "It was," he wrote afterwards, "the most remarkable event of its kind I ever witnessed.... One after another, prominent fraternity men ... stood up before their fellows and confessed that they had been living poor, low-grade lives and from henceforth meant to be good."

In 1915, Buchman's YMCA work took him to India with evangelist Sherwood Eddy. There he met, briefly, Mahatma Gandhi (the first of many meetings), and became friends with Rabindranath Tagore and Amy Carmichael, founder of the Dohnavur Fellowship. Despite speaking to audiences of up to 60,000, Buchman was critical of the large-scale approach, describing it as "like hunting rabbits with a brass band".

From February to August 1916 Buchman worked with the YMCA mission in China and eventually returned to Pennsylvania due to the increasing illness of his father.

Buchman next took a part-time post at Hartford Theological Seminary as a personal evangelism lecturer. There he began to gather a group of men to assist in the conversion of China to Christianity. He was asked to lead missionary conferences at Guling and Beidaihe, which he saw as an opportunity to train native Chinese leaders at a time when many missionaries held attitudes of white superiority. Through his friendship with Xu Qian (Vice-Minister of Justice and later acting Prime Minister,) he got to know Sun Yat-sen. However, his criticism of other missionaries in China, with an implication that sin, including homosexuality, was keeping some of them from being effective, led to conflict. Bishop Logan Roots, deluged with complaints, asked Buchman to leave China in 1918.

While still based at Hartford, Buchman spent much of his time traveling and forming groups of Christian students at Princeton University and Yale University, as well as Oxford.

Sam Shoemaker, a Princeton graduate and one-time secretary of the Philadelphian Society, who had met Buchman in China, became one of his leading American disciples.

In 1922, after a prolonged spell with students in Cambridge, Buchman resigned his position at Hartford to live by faith and launch the First Century Christian Fellowship.

== First Century Christian Fellowship to Oxford Groups ==
Following a dissent with Princeton University, Buchman found greater support in England where he designed a strategy of holding house parties at various locations, during which he hoped for Christian commitment to his First Century Christian Fellowship among those attending. In addition, men trained by Buchman began holding regular lunchtime meetings in the study of Julian Thornton-Duesbery, then Chaplain of Corpus Christi College, Oxford.

By 1928, numbers had grown so large that the meetings moved to the ballroom of the Oxford Randolph Hotel, before being invited to use the library of the Oxford University Church, St Mary's.

In response to criticism by Tom Driberg in his first scoop in the Daily Express that this "strange new sect" involved members holding hands in a circle and publicly confessing their sins (a fabrication according to those who were there), the Daily Express printed a statement by Canon L. W. Grensted, Chaplain and Fellow of University College and a university lecturer in psychology bearing "testimony not only to [their] general sanity and good health but also to [their] real effectiveness. Men student whom I have known have not only found a stronger faith and a new happiness, but have also made definite progress in the quality of their study, and in their athletics too."

The name Oxford Group appeared in South Africa in 1929, as a result of a railway porter writing the name on the windows of those compartments reserved by a traveling team of Frank Buchman's First Century Christian Fellowship followers. They were from Oxford and in South Africa to promote the movement. The South African press picked up on the name and it stuck. It stuck because many of the campaigns of the Oxford Group were undergirded by Oxford University students and staff. And every year between 1930 and 1937 house-parties were held at the university.

In June 1939, the Oxford Group was legally incorporated.

== Spiritual life, not religion ==
The Oxford group literature defines the group as "not being a religion", for it had "no hierarchy, no temples, no endowments, its workers no salaries, no plans but God's plan". Their chief aim was "A new world order for Christ, the King".

In fact one could not "belong" to the Oxford group for it had no membership list, badges, or definite location. It was simply "a group of people from all walks of life who have surrendered their life to God". Their endeavour was to lead a spiritual life "under God's Guidance" and their purpose was to carry their message so others could do the same.

The group was more like a spiritual revolution, unhampered by institutional ties; it combined social activities with religion, it had no organized board of officers. The group declared itself to be not an "organization" but an "organism". Though Frank Buchman was the group's founder and leader, group members believed their true leader to be the Holy Spirit and "relied on God Control", meaning "guidance received from God" by those people who had "fully surrendered to God's will". By working with people from all the churches, regardless of denomination, they drew new members. A newspaper account in 1933 described it as "personal evangelism — one man or woman talking to another and discussing his or her problems was the order of the day". In 1936, Good Housekeeping magazine described the group as having neither membership, nor dues, nor paid leaders, nor new theological creed, nor regular meetings; it was simply a fellowship of people who desire to follow a way of life, a determination, and not a denomination.

=== Primary purpose ===
Frank Buchman's speeches include references to "The Oxford Group's primary purpose".

- The Oxford Group seeks to be "living Christianity". It builds on the "accomplished work of Jesus Christ" as set forth in the New Testament. Its aim is to bring to life and make real for each person the articles of faith with which their own Church provides them.
- The international problems and wars are said by the group to be personal problems at bottom, of selfishness and fear. Ways of life must therefore be changed if problems are to be solved. According to the group, peace in the world could only spring from peace in the hearts of men. A dynamic experience of God's free spirit is said to be the answer to international, national and regional antagonism, economic depression, racial conflict and international strife.
- The secret is said to be "God Control", the only sane people in an insane world being those controlled by God. God-controlled personalities would make God-controlled nationalities. This is the aim of the Oxford Group. The true patriot should surrender his life to God to bring his nation "under God's control". World peace could only come through nations which have achieved "God-control". And "everybody can listen to God. You can. I can. Everybody can have a part."
- "There are those who feel that internationalism is not enough. Nationalism can unite a nation. Supernationalism can unite a world. "God-controlled" supernationalism seems to them to be the only sure foundation for world peace!"
- This is all in this declaration by Buchman: "I challenge Denmark to be a miracle among the nations, her national policy dictated by God, her national defense the respect and gratitude of her neighbors, her national armament an army of life-changers. Denmark can demonstrate to the nations that spiritual power is the first force in the world. The true patriot gives his life to bring about his country's resurrection."

=== The Four Absolutes ===
Moral standards of

- "Absolute honesty",
- "Absolute purity",
- "Absolute unselfishness", and
- "Absolute love",

though recognized as impossible to attain, were guidelines to help determine whether a course of action was "directed by God".

The "Four Absolutes" seem to have first appeared in a book by Robert E. Speer, titled The Principles of Jesus. In the Chapter, Jesus and Standards, Speer laid down "Four Principles" (honesty, purity, unselfishness, love) that he believed represented the distilled, uncompromising, moral principles taught by Jesus. Speer quoted Bible verses for each "Principle".

In 1909, Professor Henry Burt Wright of Yale, citing Speer's work, dug up many more Bible verses that set forth these same Principles in the YMCA book: The Will of God and a Man's Lifework. Wright dubbed them Absolute rather than "Principles". Next, Frank Buchman and the Oxford Group adopted and popularized the phrase "The Four Absolutes".

In Oxford Group terms, sin was "anything that kept one from God or one another" and is "as contagious as any bodily disease". The soul needs cleansing: "We all know 'nice' sinless sinners who need that surgical spiritual operation as keenly as the most miserable sinner of us all."

=== Spiritual practices ===
To be "spiritually reborn", the Oxford Group advocated four practices set out below:

- "Sharing our sins and temptations with another Christian".
- "Restitution to all whom we have wronged, directly or indirectly".
- "Surrender our life past, present and future, to God's keeping and direction".
- "Listening for God's guidance, and carrying it out".

==== Sharing ====
In the Oxford Group, sharing was considered a necessity. Sharing referred to telling others, in small or big groups, about personal life details of sins, steps to change behaviours and their results, as well as telling others what guidance was received during a "quiet time". It allowed one to be healed, therefore it was also a blessing to share. Sharing was considered to not only bring relief, but honest sharing of sin, and of "victory over sin", was considered a way to help others to open about themselves. Sharing built trust. The message one brings to others by speaking of one's own sins, one's own experiences, the power of God in guiding one's life would bring hope to others that a spiritually changed life gives strength to overcome life's difficulties. It must be done with total conviction for "Half measures will be as fruitless as no measures."

Some found public confession disturbing. Beverley Nichols stated "And all that business about telling one's sins in public... It is spiritual nudism!"

However Cuthbert Bardsley, who worked with Buchman for some years and later became Bishop of Coventry, said, "I never came across public confession in house parties — or very, very rarely. Frank [Buchman] tried to prevent it, and was very annoyed if people ever trespassed beyond the bounds of decency." Buchman's biographer, Garth Lean, wrote that he attended meetings from 1932 on "and cannot recall hearing any unwise public confessions".

==== Guidance ====
The central practice to the Oxford Group members was guidance, which was usually sought in a quiet time early morning, using pen and paper. The grouper would normally read the Bible or other spiritual literature, then take time in quiet with pen and paper, seeking "God's directions" for the day ahead, trying to find "God's perspective" on whatever issues were on the listener's mind. The grouper would test their thoughts against the standards of "absolute honesty, purity, unselfishness and love", and normally check with a colleague.

Guidance was also sought collectively from groupers when they formed teams. They would take a "quiet time", each individual writing his or her sense of "God's direction" on the matter in question. They would then check with each other, seeking consensus on the action to take.

Some church leaders criticized this practice. Others supported it. The Oxford theologian, B. H. Streeter, Provost of Queen's College, made it the subject of the Warburton Lectures, given at Oxford University in 1933-1935. These lectures were published under the title The God Who Speaks. Throughout the ages, he wrote, men and women have sought God's will in quiet and listening. The Oxford Group was following a long tradition.

Sometimes groupers were banal in their descriptions of "guidance". However, innumerable examples were given by them of groupers discovering creative initiatives through times of "quiet time seeking God's direction", as can be seen in books about the Oxford Group such as For Sinners Only by A. J. Russell (1885-1953), which went through 17 editions in two years, or Frank Buchman - a life by Garth Lean (1912-1993).

Buchman would share the thoughts which he felt were guided by God, but whether others pursued those thoughts was up to them.

=== The Five Cs ===
The "Five Cs":

- Confidence,
- Confession,
- Conviction,
- Conversion, and
- Continuance

was the process of life changing undertaken by the "life changer":

- Confidence: the grouper had to have confidence and know his secrets would be kept .
- Confession: the grouper had to be honest about the real state of their life.
- Conviction: the acknowledgement of the seriousness of their sins by the grouper and the need to be freed of them.
- Conversion: the process of the grouper's decision to surrender to God had to be the grouper's own free will.
- Continuance: the grouper was responsible as a "life changer" to help new groupers become all that God wanted them to be.

Only God could change a person, and the work of the "life changer" had to be done under God's direction.

== Methods ==
=== "House Parties" ===
The first First Century Christian Fellowship "House Party" was held in China in 1918.

In the summer of 1930 the first International House Party was held at Oxford, followed by another the next year attended by 700 people. In the summer of 1933, 5,000 guests turned up for some part of an event which filled six colleges and lasted seventeen days. Almost 1,000 were clergy, including twelve bishops. By 1934 the International House Party had grown and was attended by representatives from 40 nations, and by 1935 it had grown further more, and was attended by 50 nations, to the total of 10,000 representatives. The 1936 International House Party at Birmingham drew 15,000 people, and The First National Assembly held in Massachusetts drew almost 10,000 people.

- There were also travelling teams organized house parties : featured out-of-town people came to the party to relate their experiences in the "Group Way of Life". Attendance was by printed invitation. Invitations were also sent to "key people" in the community.
- House parties were held in a variety of locations: wealthy homes, fashionable hotels, inns, or summer resorts, as well as outdoor camps, and, at times, less fashionable locations such as college dorms. House parties were held from a weekend up to two weeks. A house party team would meet in advance for training and preparation. The team would remain throughout the meetings and handle a number of details. Oxford Group literature was on display.
- Meetings followed no formal agenda and were not like church meetings, as singing and public prayer were absent. Time was devoted to talks by the team members on subjects such as sin, surrender, quiet time, the four absolutes, guidance, and intelligent witness.

However, the Oxford Group had its own song:

"On sure foundation Build we God's new nation, strong and clear each year On God's word Shall we stand and build together what none can ever, bridges from man to man, the whole wide earth to span."

=== Slogans ===
Most were coined through Buchman's "quiet time"; he knew slogans would catch attention, be more easily remembered and more readily repeated. They provided simple answers to problems people face in themselves and others. A few are listed below

- "Pray: stands for Powerful Radiograms Always Yours",
- "Constipated Christians come clean",
- "Every man is a force, not a field",
- "Interesting sinners make compelling saints",
- "When a man listens, God speaks"
- "A spiritual radiophone in every home",
- "Sin blinds, sin binds",
- "World changing through life-changing"

=== Literature ===
Some of the Oxford Group literature is available online. See references.

- For Sinners Only by Arthur James Russell (1932) was characterized as the Oxford Group "bible"
- Soul Surgery by H. A. Walter (1919)
- What Is the Oxford Group? by The Layman with a Notebook (1933) and
- The Eight Points of the Oxford Group by C. Irving Benson (1938)

About alcoholics who found sobriety in the Oxford Group, there were three autobiographies by Oxford Group members who were active alcoholics which were published in the 1930s. These books provided accounts of the alcoholics' failed attempts to make their lives meaningful until, as a result of their Oxford Group membership, they found a transformation in their lives and sobriety through surrendering to God. The books were;

- I Was a Pagan by V. C. Kitchen (1934)
- Life Began Yesterday by Stephen Foot (1935)
- The Big Bender by Charles Clapp (1938).
- The stories contained in Alcoholics Anonymous Big Book, are very similar in style to these much earlier works.

== History ==
=== Campaigns through Europe ===
The Oxford Group conducted campaigns in many European countries. In 1934 a team of 30 visited Norway at the invitation of Carl J. Hambro, President of the Norwegian Parliament. 14,000 people crammed into three meetings in one of Oslo's largest halls, and there were countless other meetings across the country. At the end of that year the Oslo daily Tidens Tegn commented in its Christmas number, "A handful of foreigners who neither knew our language, nor understood our ways and customs, came to the country. A few days later the whole country was talking about God, and two months after the thirty foreigners arrived, the mental outlook of the whole country has definitely changed." On April 22, 1945 Bishop Fjellbu, Bishop of Trondheim, preached in the church of St Martin-in-the-Fields, London. "I wish to state publicly," he said, "that the foundations of the united resistance of Norwegian Churchmen to Nazism were laid by the Oxford Group's work".

Similar stories can be told of campaigns in Denmark, where the Primate of Denmark, Bishop Fuglsang-Damgaard said that the Oxford Group "has opened my eyes to that gift of God which is called Christian fellowship, and which I have experienced in this Group to which I now belong". When the Nazis invaded Denmark, Bishop Fuglsang-Damgaard, Bishop of Copenhagen, was sent to a concentration camp. Before imprisonment he smuggled a message to Buchman saying that through the Oxford Group he had found a spirit which the Nazis could not break and that he went without fear.

=== Attempt to reach Nazi leaders in Germany ===
In the 1930s, the Oxford Group had a substantial following in Germany. They watched the rise of the Nazi Party with alarm, as did those elsewhere in Europe and America. Buchman kept in close touch with his German colleagues, and felt compelled to attempt to reach the Nazi leaders in Germany, and win them to a new approach.

Buchman was convinced that without a change in the heart of the National Socialist regime, a world war would become inevitable. He also believed that any person, including the German leaders, could find a living Christian faith with a commitment to Christ's moral values.

He tried to meet Hitler, but was unsuccessful. He met with Himmler three times at the request of Moni von Crammon, an Oxford Group adherent, the last time in 1936. To a Danish journalist and friend he said a few hours after the final interview that the doors were now closed. "Germany has come under the domination of a terrible demonic power. A counter-action is absolutely necessary."

As study of Gestapo documents has revealed, the Nazis watched the Oxford Group with suspicion from 1934 on. A first detailed secret Gestapo report about The Oxford Group or Movement was published in November 1936 warning that 'it had turned into a dangerous opponent of National Socialism'. The Nazis also classified the Stalinist version of Bolshevism and non-Nazi, right-wing groups such as Catholic Action as dangerous to Nazism.

Upon his return to New York from Berlin, Buchman gave a number of interviews. He was quoted as reportedly saying, "I thank heaven for a man like Adolf Hitler, who built a front line of defence against the anti-Christ of Communism." The Rev. Garrett Stearly, one of Buchman's colleagues from Princeton University who was present at the interview, wrote, "I was amazed when the story came out. It was so out of key with the interview." Buchman chose not to respond to the article, feeling that to do so would endanger his friends among the opposition in Germany.

During the war, the Oxford Group in Germany divided into three parts. Some submitted to Himmler's demand that they cut all links with Buchman and the Oxford Group abroad. The largest group continued the work of bringing Christian change to people under a different name, Arbeitsgemeinschaft für Seelsorge (Working team for the Care of Souls), without being involved in politics and always subject to surveillance. A third group joined the active opposition. Moni Von Crammon's son-in-law was one of those executed along with Adam von Trott zu Solz. They were executed under Hitler's orders after the July 20 plot.

After World War II, further Gestapo documents came to light; one from 1939 states: "The Group preaches revolution against the national state and has quite evidently become its Christian opponent." Another, from 1942, states: "No other Christian movement has underlined so strongly the character of Christianity as being supernational and independent of all racial barriers."

Some from the Oxford Group in Germany continued to oppose the Nazi regime during the war. In Norway, Bishop Arne Fjellbu of Trondheim said in 1945: "I wish to state publicly that the foundations of the united resistance of Norwegian Churchmen to Nazism were laid by the Oxford Group work."

=== Presence in the United States ===
In 1927, after his two years trial as a rector to Calvary Church in Manhattan, Sam Shoemaker gradually set the U.S.s headquarters of Frank Buchman's First Century Christian Fellowship soon to be named Oxford Group at Calvary House adjacent to the church.

By 1936, the organization had already come to national attention from the media and Hollywood.

=== Transformation into Moral Re-Armament ===
In 1938, Buchman made a speech in East Ham Town Hall, London, in which he stated: "The crisis is fundamentally a moral one. The nations must re-arm morally. Moral recovery is essentially the forerunner of economic recovery." The same year the British tennis star H. W. Austin edited the book Moral Rearmament (The Battle for Peace), which sold half a million copies. Gradually the former Oxford Group developed into Moral Re-Armament.

A number of Oxford Groups as well as individuals dissociated themselves from Buchman as a result of his launching of Moral Re-Armament. Some Oxford Group members disapproved Buchman's attention to matters not purely personal, or his 'going into politics.' Buchman's view was that if Moral Re-Armament was the car, the Oxford Group was the engine, and that individual change was the basis of both. He had said to his students of Penn State and Hartford as early as 1921 that the First Century Christian Fellowship was "a program of life issuing in personal, social, racial, national and supernational change" or that it had "nothing to do with politics, yet everything to do with politics, because it leads to change in politicians". Nonetheless, while maintaining a lot of Christian language, Moral Re-Armament became inclusive of all shades of religious and philosophical convictions, Buchman comparing in a speech Moral Re-Armament to "the good road of an ideology inspired by God upon which all can unite. Catholic, Jew and Protestant, Hindu, Muslim, Buddhist and Confucianist - all find they can change, where needed and travel along this good road together".

In Britain, the Oxford Group/Moral Re-Armament was very active. The novelist Daphne du Maurier published Come Wind, Come Weather, stories of ordinary Britons who had found hope and new life through the group. She dedicated it to "Frank Buchman, whose initial vision made possible the world of the living characters in these stories", and added, "What they are doing up and down the country in helping men and women solve their problems, and prepare them for whatever lies ahead, will prove to be of national importance in the days to come." The book sold 650,000 copies in Britain alone.

When war broke out, Moral Re-Armament workers joined the Allied Forces in large numbers, and were decorated for valour in many theatres of war. Others worked to heighten morale and overcome bottlenecks, particularly in war-related industries. About 30 Oxford Group workers were exempted from military service to continue this work. However, when Ernest Bevin became Minister of Labour in 1940, he decided to conscript them. Over 2,500 clergy and ministers signed a petition opposing this, and 174 Members of Parliament put down a motion stating the same. Bevin made it clear that he would resign from the Government if he was defeated, and the Government put a three-line whip upon its supporters. As a result, the Oxford Group workers were excluded from the Exemption from Military Service bill.

In the United States, where Moral Re-Armament was doing similar work, Senator (later President) Harry Truman, Chair of the Senate Committee investigating war contracts, told a Washington press conference in 1943: "Suspicions, rivalries, apathy, greed lie behind most of the bottlenecks. This is where the Moral Re-Armament group comes in. Where others have stood back and criticized, they have rolled up their sleeves and gone to work. They have already achieved remarkable results in bringing teamwork into industry, on the principles not of 'who's right', but of 'what's right'."

At the end of the war, the Moral Re-Armament workers returned to the task of establishing a lasting peace. In 1946, Moral Re-Armament bought and restored a large, derelict hotel at Caux, Switzerland, and this became a centre for reconciliation across Europe, bringing together thousands, including German Chancellor Konrad Adenauer and French Foreign Minister Robert Schuman. Its work was described by the historians Douglas Johnston and Cynthia Sampson as an "important contribution to one of the greatest achievements in the entire record of modern statecraft: the astonishingly rapid Franco-German reconciliation after 1945".

In the following decades, Moral Re-Armament work expanded across the globe, particularly into the African and Asian countries moving towards independence from colonial rule. Many leaders of these independence struggles have paid tribute to Moral Re-Armament contribution towards bringing unity between groups in conflict, and helping ease the transition into independence. In 1956 King Mohammed V of Morocco sent a message to Buchman: "I thank you for all you have done for Morocco in the course of these last testing years. Moral Re-Armament must become for us Muslims as much an incentive as it is for you Christians and for all nations." In 1960 Archbishop Makarios and Dr Kucuk, President and Vice-President of Cyprus, jointly sent the first flag of independent Cyprus to Frank Buchman at Caux in recognition of Moral Re-Armament help.

In 2001 Moral Re-Armament became "Initiatives of Change", a name expressing the emphasis of the organization in effecting social change beginning with personal change. Initiatives of Change claims spiritual roots but no religious affiliation, and invites "those with a faith...both to explore the roots of their own tradition, and to discover and respect the beliefs of others".

== Impact and legacy ==
=== Impact on industry ===
In Buchman's view, management and labour could "work together like the fingers on the hand", and in order to make that possible he aimed to answer "the self-will in management and labour who are both so right, and so wrong". MRA's role was to offer the experience which would free those people's hearts and minds from the motivations or prejudices which prevent just solutions.

William Grogan, an International Vice-President of the American Transport Workers' Union, said that "between 1946 and 1953 national union leaders, local union officials, shop stewards and rank and file union members from 75 countries had received training" in MRA principles. Evert Kupers, for 20 years President of the Dutch Confederation of Trades Unions, stated that "the thousands who have visited Caux have been deeply impressed by its message for our age and by the real comradeship they found there." In France Maurice Mercier, Secretary-General of the textile workers within the Force Ouvriere, said: "Class war today means one half of humanity against the other half, each possessing a powerful arsenal of destruction... Not one cry of hatred, not one hour of work lost, not one drop of blood shed - that is the revolution to which Moral Re Armement calls bosses and workers."

=== Alcoholics Anonymous ===
In Akron, Ohio, Jim Newton, an Oxford Group member, knew that one of Harvey S. Firestone's sons, Russell, was a serious alcoholic. He took him first to a drying-out clinic and then on to an Oxford Group conference in Denver. The young man "gave his life to God", and thereafter enjoyed extended periods of sobriety. The family doctor called it a "medical miracle". Harvey Firestone Senior was so grateful that, in January 1933, he invited Buchman and a team of sixty to conduct a ten-day campaign in Akron. They left behind them a strong functioning group which met each week in the house of T. Henry Williams, amongst whom were an Akron surgeon, Bob Smith, and his wife Anne. Bob was a secret drinker.

Rowland Hazard claimed that it was Carl Jung who caused him to seek a "spiritual solution" to his alcoholism, which led to Rowland joining the Oxford Group. He was introduced by Shep Cornell to Cornell's friend Ebby Thacher. Ebby had a serious drinking problem. Hazard introduced Ebby to Jung's theory and then to the Oxford Group. For a time Ebby took up residence at Sam Shoemaker's Calvary Rescue Mission that catered mainly to saving down-and-outs and drunks. Shoemaker taught inductees the concept of God being that of one's understanding.

Ebby Thacher, in keeping with the Oxford Teachings, needed to keep his own conversion experience real by carrying the Oxford message of salvation to others. Ebby had heard that his old drinking buddy Bill Wilson was again drinking heavily. Thacher and Cornell visited Wilson at his home and introduced him to the Oxford Group's religious conversion cure. Wilson, who was then an agnostic, was "aghast" when Thacher told him he had "got religion".

A few days later, in a drunken state, Wilson went to the Calvary Rescue Mission in search of Ebby Thacher. It was there that he attended his first Oxford Group meeting and would later describe the experience: "Penitents started marching forward to the rail. Unaccountably impelled, I started too... Soon, I knelt among the sweating, stinking penitents ... Afterward, Ebby ... told me with relief that I had done all right and had given my life to God." The Call to the Altar did little to curb Wilson's drinking. A couple of days later, he re-admitted himself to Charles B. Towns Hospital. Wilson had been admitted to Towns hospital three times earlier between 1933 and 1934. This would be his fourth and last stay.

Bill Wilson obtained his "spiritual awakening" going through the steps with Ebby in Towns Hospital where he had his conversion. Wilson claimed to have seen a "white light", and when he told his attending physician, William Silkworth about his experience, he was advised not to discount it. After Wilson left the hospital, he never drank again.

After his release from the hospital, Wilson attended Oxford Group meetings and went on a mission to save other alcoholics. His prospects came through Towns Hospital and the Calvary Mission. Though he was not able to keep one alcoholic sober, he found that by engaging in the activity of trying to convert others he was able to keep himself sober. It was this realization, that he needed another alcoholic to work with, that brought him into contact with Bob Smith while on a business trip in Akron, Ohio.

Earlier Bill Wilson had been advised by Dr Silkworth to change his approach and tell the alcoholics they suffered from an illness, one that could kill them, and afterward apply the Oxford Practices. The idea that alcoholism was an illness, not a moral failing, was different from the Oxford concept that drinking was a sin. This is what he brought to Bob Smith on their first meeting. Smith was the first alcoholic Wilson helped to sobriety. Dr. Bob and Bill W., as they were later called, went on to found Alcoholics Anonymous.

Wilson later acknowledged in Alcoholics Anonymous Comes of Age: "The early AA got its ideas of self-examination, acknowledgement of character defects, restitution for harm done, and working with others straight from the Oxford Group and directly from Sam Shoemaker, their former leader in America, and from nowhere else."

In 1934, James Houck joined the Oxford Group and became sober on December 12, one day after Wilson did. AA was founded on June 10, 1935. In September 2004, Houck was the last surviving person to have attended Oxford Group meetings with Wilson, who died in 1971. At the age of 98, Houck was still active in the group, now renamed Moral Re-armament, and it was his mission to restore the Oxford Group's spiritual methods through the "Back to Basics program", a twelve step program similar to AA. Houck believed the old Oxford Group spiritual methods were stronger and more effective than the ones currently practiced in A.A. Houck was trying to introduce the program into the prison systems.

Houck's assessment of Wilson's time in the Oxford Group: "He was never interested in the things we were interested in; he only wanted to talk about alcoholism; he was not interested in giving up smoking; he was a ladies man and would brag of his sexual exploits with other members", and in Houck's opinion he remained an agnostic.

== Influences ==
Because of its influence on the lives of several highly prominent individuals, the group attracted highly visible members of society, including members of the British Parliament and other European leaders and such prominent Americans as the Firestone family, founders of the Firestone Tire and Rubber Company of Ohio. Though sometimes controversial (the group attracted opposition from the Roman Catholic Church), the group grew into a well-known, informal and international network of people by the 1930s. The London newspaper editor Arthur J. Russell joined the group after attending a meeting in 1931. He wrote For Sinners Only in 1932, which inspired the writers of God Calling.

Among those influenced by the Oxford Group and Frank Buchman, one also finds:

- Paul Tournier, the Swiss physician and author whose Medicine of the Person became a worldwide success
- Emil Brunner, the Swiss Protestant (Reformed) theologian
- Theophil Spoerri, a Swiss writer and academic who was instrumental in setting up the Gotthardbund, a civil society organisation which fought against Nazi propaganda in Switzerland from 1940 to 1945.
- Gabriel Marcel, French philosopher, playwright and leading Christian existentialist

== Evaluation and critics ==
=== Carl Jung on the Oxford Group ===
Carl Jung on the matter of an individual and his involvement in the Oxford Group:

My attitude to these matters is that, as long as a patient is really a member of a church, he ought to be serious. He ought to be really and sincerely a member of that church, and he should not go to a doctor to get his conflicts settled when he believes that he should do it with God. For instance, when a member of the Oxford Group comes to me in order to get treatment, I say, "You are in the Oxford Group; so long as you are there, you settle your affair with the Oxford Group. I can't do it better than Jesus.

=== Published literature critical of the Oxford Group ===
In 1933, Hensley Henson, the then Bishop of Durham, published The Group Movement, which analysed and criticized the movement.

[The Group movement] is gravely, even fatally, defective in three important respects... It ignores the demands of the intellect in this high matter of religion... [It] is too closely bound to the moods and claims of Adolescence... [and] the conception of Christianity which Groupism presents is far too meagre and limited.

In 1934, Marjorie Harrison, an Episcopal Church member, published a book, Saints Run Mad, that challenged the group, its leader and their practices.

The theologian Reinhold Niebuhr criticized Buchman's philosophy and pursuit of the wealthy and powerful. "The idea is that if the man of power can be converted, God will be able to control a larger area of human life through his power than if a little man were converted. This is the logic which has filled the Buchmanites with touching solicitude for the souls of such men as Henry Ford or Harvey Firestone". He called its moral principles "a religious expression of a decadent individualism... bourgeois optimism, individualism and moralism expressing itself in the guise of religion", and added, "no wonder the rather jittery plutocrats of our day open their spacious summer homes to its message!"

== Confusion with Oxford Movement ==
The Oxford Group is occasionally confused with the Oxford Movement, an effort that began in the 19th-century Anglican Communion to encourage high-church practice and demonstrate the church's apostolic heritage. Though both had an association with members and students of the University of Oxford at different times, the Oxford Group and the Oxford Movement are unrelated.
