= Augusta Bertha Wagner =

American writer

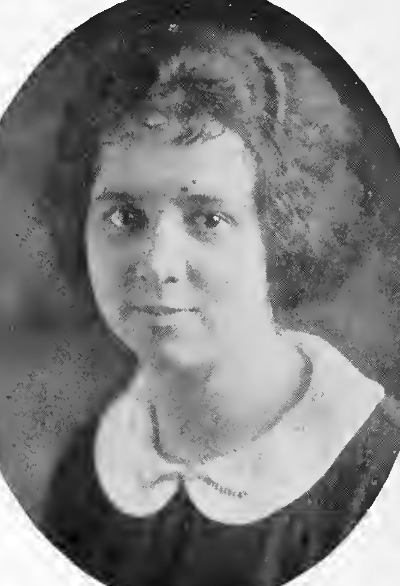
- Augusta B. Wagner, from the 1924 Wellesley College yearbook
- Born: May 19, 1895; New York City
- Died: February 4, 1976; Bryn Mawr, Pennsylvania
- Notable work: Labor Legislation in China (1938)
- Partner: Margaret Bailey Speer

Augusta Bertha Wagner (May 19, 1895 – February 4, 1976) was an American missionary educator in China, and a headmistress of the Shipley School.

== Early life ==
Augusta "Gussie" Wagner was born in New York City, and grew up in the city's Yorkville neighborhood. She was a member of the Madison Avenue Presbyterian Church and friend of its pastor, Henry Sloane Coffin. She earned a bachelor's degree at Wellesley College in 1924, and completed doctoral studies in economics at Columbia University.

== Career ==
Wagner briefly served on the YWCA board after college. She taught economics at Yenching University in Beijing, from 1926 until 1942. While teaching at Yenching, Wagner wrote Labor Legislation in China (1938), based on her doctoral dissertation. After Pearl Harbor, she was held in a Japanese internment camp in Weihsien, then returned to the United States in 1943. In 1944 and 1945, she worked in Washington, D.C. at the State Department.

Wagner was associate headmistress at the Shipley School, alongside her partner, Margaret Bailey Speer, from 1945 to 1960. She also spoke at Bryn Mawr College and at church and women's groups about her experiences and economic conditions in China.

== Personal life ==
Wagner lived, worked, and traveled with fellow American teacher Margaret Bailey Speer, in China and in the United States, from the 1930s into the 1970s. In 1968, Speer and Wagner were honored by the Yenching Alumni club with a supper in Honolulu. Wagner died in 1976, aged 80 years.
