= Self-abasement =

Self-humiliation due to a lack of self-respect

Self-abasement is humiliating oneself when one feels lower or less deserving of respect.

Self-abasement might have a religious aspect for those seeking humility before God, perhaps in the context of monastic or cenobitic lifestyle.

It also has a sexual and fetish aspect for those people who enjoy erotic humiliation and other related BDSM practices.

Examples of self-abasement practices include self-flagellation, bondage, torture, public humiliation (including online humiliation).

In psychology, self-abasement is associated with shame (rather than guilt) and involves the reduction of the subject's self-esteem. The notion of self-abasement can be said to be based in Freudian psychoanalysis. Fear may also result in self-abasement.

== See also ==
- Abstinence
- Ego reduction
- Egolessness
- Humility
- Mortification of the flesh
- Prostration
