= Margaret Bailey Speer =

American educator (1900–1997)

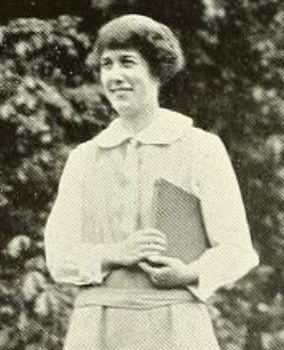
- Margaret Bailey Speer, from a 1925 publication.
- Born: November 20, 1900; Englewood, New Jersey, U.S.
- Died: September 21, 1997 (aged 96); Gladwyne, Pennsylvania, U.S.
- Occupations: Educator, missionary, school administrator
- Years active: 1920s–1970s
- Known for: Dean, Women's College of Yenching University (1934–1941) Headmistress, The Shipley School (1944–1965)
- Partner: Augusta Bertha Wagner
- Parent: Robert Elliott Speer
- Relatives: Robert Milton Speer (grandfather)

Margaret Bailey Speer (November 20, 1900 – September 21, 1997) was an American educator and teaching missionary. She was dean of the Women's College of Yenching University in Beijing from 1934 to 1941, and headmistress of the Shipley School in Pennsylvania from 1944 to 1965.

== Early life ==
Margaret Bailey Speer was born in Englewood, New Jersey, the daughter of Robert Elliott Speer and Emma Doll Bailey. Her father was a Protestant leader, secretary of the Presbyterian Board of Foreign Missions. Her mother was active in YWCA national leadership during World War I. Her grandfather, Robert Milton Speer, was a Congressman.

Speer attended the Dwight-Englewood School, graduating in 1917; she graduated from Bryn Mawr College in 1922. At Bryn Mawr, she was president of the Christian Association and active in the YWCA. She later earned a master's degree at Columbia University.

== Career ==
After college, Speer taught at Sweet Briar College, and served as secretary to British suffragist Maude Royden while she toured in the United States. The Presbyterian Mission Board assigned her to teach English at the Women's College of Yenching University in 1925. She became dean of the college in 1934, took a furlough in 1937, and stayed at Yenching until 1941, when her job ended among the increased tensions of World War II. She reached home in 1943, after some time in a Japanese-run internment camp for enemy aliens in China.

Back in the United States, she was a popular speaker at church women's events. She became headmistress of the Shipley School, a nonsectarian girls' boarding school in Bryn Mawr, Pennsylvania, in 1944. During her tenure, the school began enrolling African-American and Jewish students. She retired in 1965. In 1979 she traveled to Yenching University with a group of American students.

Speer was president of the Headmistresses Association of the East (1950 to 1952), the National Association of Principals for Girls (1959 to 1961), and the Lower Merion Township Human Relations Council (1966 to 1968). She served on the session of the Bryn Mawr Presbyterian Church.

== Personal life ==
Speer lived, worked, and traveled with fellow American teacher Augusta Bertha Wagner in China and in the United States, from the 1930s into the 1970s. Wagner died in 1976; Speer died in 1997, aged 96 years, in Gladwyne, Pennsylvania. Her papers are in the Speer Family Papers at Bryn Mawr. Her letters from China were published in 1994 as Like Good Steel: The China Letters of Margaret Bailey Speer, North China, 1925–1943. The Shipley School presents a Margaret Bailey Speer Award to a distinguished alumna. Among the recipients of the Margaret Bailey Speer Award is activist Torie Osborn.
