= Ego reduction =

The concept of ego reduction is predicated on the use of Sigmund Freud's concept of the ego to describe the conscious adult self; and broadly describes the deflating of an over-inflated or egotistical sense of oneself - a curtailment of what Iris Murdoch called “the anxious avaricious tentacles of the self”.

Among other contexts, ego reduction has been seen as a goal in Alcoholics Anonymous; as a part of BDSM play, providing a means of entering "subspace"; and as a way of attaining religious humility and freedom from desire in Buddhism.

== Alcoholics Anonymous ==
Harry Tiebout saw the surrender of the alcoholic in AA as dependent upon ego reduction, in the twin sense of a relinquishment of personal narcissism, and the development of a new trust in other people.

Tiebout stressed that this was a process that should be applied only to the (over-extended) infantile ego sense — the surviving remnants of an original megalomania that had not been worn away by the normal processes of life.

== Therapy ==
While most therapy favours a process of strengthening the ego functions, at the expense of the irrational parts of the mind, a reduction in self-importance and self-involvement — ego reduction — is also generally valorised: Robin Skynner for example describing the 'shrink' as a head-shrinker, and adding that “as our swollen heads get smaller... as people we grow”.

Rational emotive behaviour therapy also favours such ego reduction as a part of extending self-control and confirming personal boundaries.

== Buddhism ==
Ego reduction is traditionally seen as the goal of the Buddha's teaching.

However, the goal of egolessness (as Buddhist therapists warn) is not to be confused with a mere loss or paralysis of ego functions: it is rather their incorporation and transcendence.

== See also ==
- Ego death
- Narcissistic supply
- Omnipotence
- Pleasure principle
- Sandor Rado
- Bhagavad Gita
