= Paul Tournier =

Swiss physician and author (1898–1986)

Paul Tournier

Paul Tournier (12 May 1898 – 7 October 1986) was a Swiss physician and author who had acquired a worldwide audience for his work in pastoral counseling. His ideas had a significant impact on the spiritual and psychosocial aspects of routine patient care, and he has been called the twentieth century's most famous Christian physician.

== Life and education ==
Tournier was born in Geneva, Switzerland, the son of Pastor Louis Tournier and Alisabeth Ormond. His 70-year-old father, who was a highly respected clergyman at St. Peter's cathedral, died three months after his birth. At the age of six he was orphaned when his mother, then 42, died from breast cancer. Afterwards Tournier and his 10-year-old sister were raised by his uncle and aunt, Mr, and Mrs, Jacques Ormond.

This painful experience had a profound effect on Tournier. He withdrew into himself and became lonely and shy. Throughout his adolescence he maintained a sense of insecurity, which he would hide behind an intellectual facade, accentuated by his mathematical success in grade school and by a Greek teacher in high school.

In 1923 Tournier received an M.D. degree at the University of Geneva. During his student years he acted as the Swiss president of the student movement Zofingia and became a Red Cross delegate for the repatriation of Austrian and Russian prisoners of war in Vienna.

On 4 October 1924 he married Nelly Bouvier. The couple had two children. In 1984, ten years after the death of his first wife, he married Corinne O'Rama in Geneva.

Tournier died from carcinoma at his home Le grain de blé (The grain of wheat) in Troinex, Switzerland.

== Career ==
Through 1924 Tournier was assistant medical doctor at the Medical Polyclinic in Geneva under Prof. Bickel. In 1925 Tournier opened a private practice in Geneva and started operating as general medical practitioner.

Tournier became increasingly interested in Calvinism and the Reformed faith, and was heavily involved in civic and medical groups. In 1932 he joined the Oxford Group. As a result of his interests he investigated the relationship between medicine, counseling, and spiritual values. Although he initially considered giving up medicine for counseling, he finally decided to combine the two, and in 1937 he transformed his private medical practice into a counseling practice.

In 1940 he published his first book Médecine de la Personne (trans. The Healing of Persons), which was dedicated to Frank Buchman, the founder of the Oxford Group, wherein he advocates that man is more than just body and a mind, he is also a spiritual being. This combination is what makes man a person. Therefore, it is impossible to know and treat him if one disregards his deepest reality. After the success of Médecine de la Personne he became a prolific writer of books dealing with the subject. Although he did not have any formal training in psychiatry or theology, his writing has influenced a generation of medical and religious professionals the world over. His books would eventually be translated into 13 languages.

Around 1946 he disassociated himself from the Oxford Group (now called Moral Re-Armament). He would eventually (in 1982) reconcile with the group (renamed again as Initiatives of Change).

Psychosomatic medicine was still in its infancy, and Tournier observed that the contemporary approach to illness was purely organic and failed to consider the patient as a whole. Tournier saw the need to consider not only the physical aspects of health, but also the psychological and spiritual dimensions. He therefore invited medical colleagues from a variety of fields and a number of philosophers to reflect on this with him. This international study group called Médecine de La Personne met for the first time in 1947, and has met annually ever since. According to the group:

Medicine of the Person is not just another branch of medicine. It is an attitude towards contact, an approach to patient-care, applicable in all areas. It puts the emphasis on awareness of patients as whole persons, with places in their community and society. Both the organic and the psychological approach are integral parts of Medicine of the Person, as is consideration of the connection between state of health, life events, social insertion and spirituality.

Tournier and two other doctors established the ecumenical Group of Bossey (named after the Chateau de Bossey, near Geneva). His book, A Doctor's Casebook in the Light of the Bible, grew out of this effort. How Tournier practiced his work can be seen in A Tournier Companion.

Throughout his career Tournier was known for his presence, gentle personality and sincere demeanor, and his ability to communicate across language barriers. As his views became more popular, he was invited to lecture overseas. He would subsequently travel extensively to promote his ideas.

== Tournier's world view and philosophy ==
Two religious experiences would underlie Tournier's later work. When he was 12, he became a Christian. As he grew up he became active in the church, started writing articles about Calvinism, and argued for orthodoxy and against liberalism. His Christian experience did not, however, become totally meaningful to him until a second experience, which he called a “face-to-face encounter with God”. This encounter transformed his life and changed everything, and gave him a vital interest in “that other side of life, for its inner dimension, so necessary to us."

This encounter caused him to radically change his medical practice. Instead of merely treating the physical disorders of his patients, he started addressing the deeper problems of the whole person. In 1937 he wrote a letter to all his patients informing them of this new orientation.

Tournier describes his newfound interest in the whole person thus:

I can speak endlessly of myself, to myself or to someone else, without ever succeeding in giving a complete and truthful picture of myself... The same thing happens with all these people who come to see me, and take so much trouble over their efforts to describe themselves to me with strict accuracy; inevitably I form an image of them which derives as much from myself as from them. If they go and see one of my colleagues he will certainly not see them exactly as I do. And they for their part will not show themselves to him in the same way they show themselves to me.

The reader will see now why it is that this problem of the person has for twenty years been of such absorbing interest to me. It has a general significance which is of vital importance for all thought and civilization: what is man? But it also has a particular significance, which is equally important for my own life: who am I, really, myself?

Some have argued that Tournier believed in universal salvation, that all would eventually be saved; however, it is more accurate to state that he believed in the ultimate triumph of Good over Evil in mankind through Christ's reconciling work. In response to a letter from a graduate student writing a master's thesis on his theology, Tournier wrote:

That you say as a theologian that I am a universalist is evident, in the sense that I believe that Jesus was sent into the world to save the sinners that we all are. This is what I understand Saint Paul to say when he mentions that sin has entered the world through one man, Adam, and spread to all men, and that he calls Jesus the second Adam through Whom redemption entered the world for all men, and even as he says 'all of creation,' that the redemption of Christ is the victory of God over the Fall. I believe that this great plan of salvation is universal, concerns not only all men but the universality of the world and that Jesus on the Cross has accomplished this Salvation, this reconciliation of men with God, that the 'chastisement' as Isaiah says is fallen upon Him to free men from the malediction of the Fall. This plan of God therefore seems to be collective, global, universal.

Tournier was active in the Ecumenical Institute of the World Council of Churches.

== Legacy ==
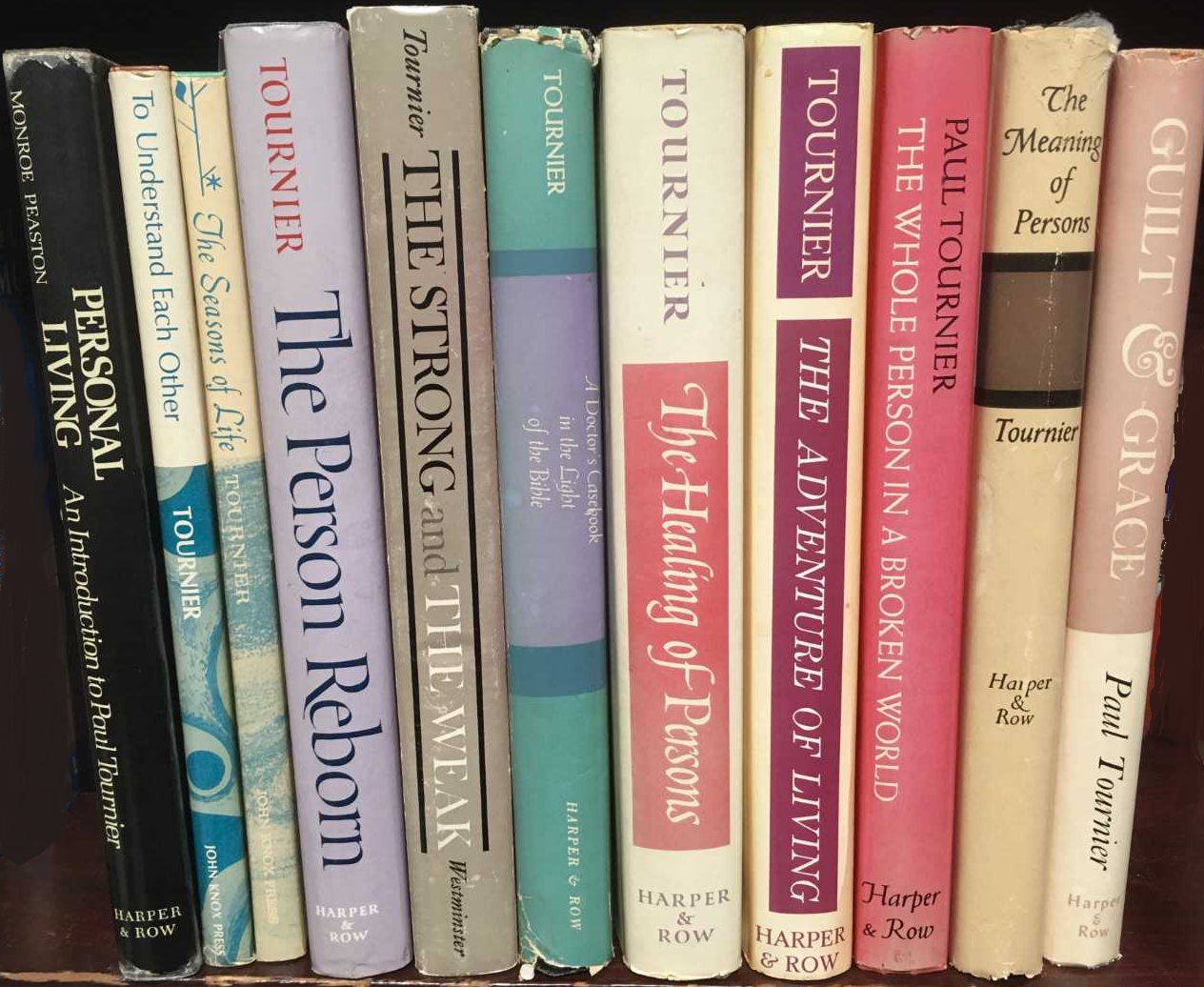
Books by and about Paul Tournier

Tournier's work has received widespread international interest and acclaim. According to Viktor Frankl:

He [Paul Tournier] was the pioneer of person-centered psychotherapy. Psychotherapy should also have a spiritual dimension, dealing with each person in his or her uniqueness and individuality. Psychotherapy cannot be personal enough.

Paul Tournier is remembered by the efforts of:

- The Paul Tournier Institute, a division of the Christian Medical and Dental Associations (CMDA). The Paul Tournier Institute is an educational endeavor, providing unique resources developed and published by the CMDA.
- Association Paul Tournier, a non-profit organization promoting ideas of Paul Tournier.
- International Group of Medicine of the Whole Person, an organization dedicated to furthering the Medicine of the Whole Person through annual meetings.
- In 2006 Christianity Today magazine listed Paul Tournier's The Meaning of Persons as one of the top 50 books that have influenced the way Evangelicals think, talk, witness, worship, and live.

== See also ==
- Pastoral care
- Biopsychosocial model
- Health psychology
- Existential therapy
- Holistic medicine

== Bibliography ==
- The Healing of Persons
- Escape from Loneliness (De la solitude à la communauté, Delachaux & Niestlé, Neuchâtel / Paris, 1943/1948)
- The Person Reborn (Technique et Foi), trans. Edwin Hudson (SCM Press, 1966, 1967) ISBN 0334012414
- The Whole Person in a Broken World
- The Strong and the Weak
- A Doctor's Casebook in the Light of the Bible (Bible et Médecine, Delachaux & Niestlé, Neuchâtel / Paris)
- The Frontier between Psychotherapy and Soul-healing
- The Meaning of Persons (Le personage et la personne, Delachaux & Niestlé)
- Guilt and Grace
- The Meaning of Gifts
- The Seasons of Life
- To Resist or to Surrender?
- Marriage Difficulties
- To Understand Each Other
- Toward a Christian Anthropology
- Fatigue in Modern Society
- Secrets
- The Adventure of Living (L'Aventure de la Vie, Delachaux et Niestlé, Neuchâtel et Paris, 1965)
- Forgiveness and Mental Health
- What is Mental Health?
- "The Person in an Age of Conformity" in Are You Nobody?
- A Place for You (L'Homme et son lieu, Delachaux et Niestlé, Neuchâtel, 1966)
- A Dialogue between Doctor and Patient
- Listen to God
- There's a New World Coming
- Learn to Grow Old
- My Religious Vocation as Physician
- The Naming of Persons
- The Gift of Feeling
- The Meaning of Possessiveness
- Creative Suffering (Face a la souffrance, Labor et Fides 1981)
- The Violence Within, Harper & Rowe, 1978
- A Tournier Companion
