= Harold Wright (South African cricketer) =

South African cricketer (1921–2006)

Personal information
- Full name: Harold Frederick Wright
- Born: 25 June 1921; Kimberley, Cape Province, South Africa
- Died: 25 February 2006 (aged 84); Durban, KwaZulu-Natal, South Africa
- Role: All-rounder

Domestic team information
- Years: Team
- 1939/40–1952/53: Orange Free State

Career statistics
Competition	First-class
Matches	31
Runs scored	1,102
Batting average	19.33
100s/50s	2/1
Top score	105*
Balls bowled	7,069
Wickets	111
Bowling average	25.15
5 wickets in innings	8
10 wickets in match	1
Best bowling	7/154
Catches/stumpings	21/–
- Source: Cricinfo, 18 April 2026

Harold Frederick Wright (25 June 1921 – 25 February 2006) was a South African cricketer who played first-class cricket for Orange Free State between 1939 and 1953.

Wright was an all-rounder, a middle-order batsman who usually opened the bowling or bowled first change. His outstanding season was 1950–51, when he captained Orange Free State, and scored 355 runs in the Currie Cup at an average of 39.44, and took 35 wickets at an average of 19.20. He was the highest wicket-taker in that season's Currie Cup. He took 11 wickets in the victory over North Eastern Transvaal, when he and James Liddle dismissed North Eastern Transvaal for 49 when they were chasing a target of 87. He was selected to play in a trial match in advance of the South African tour of England in 1951, and although he was not chosen to tour, he was named as a reserve.

Wright broke a kneecap while playing hockey and missed the 1951–52 season, but he returned in 1952–53, taking his best first-class figures of 7 for 154 against Natal. In the Currie Cup season he took 23 wickets at 26.78, and Orange Free State finished only two points short of winning the Cup. He played no more first-class cricket after that season.

Wright married Gladys Beatrice Chenery in Bloemfontein in January 1948. He died in Durban in February 2006, aged 84.
