= Henry Wright (footballer) =

Australian rules footballer

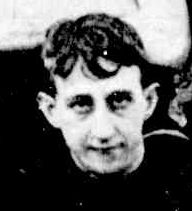

Personal information
- Full name: Henry Manly Derward Wright
- Born: 24 February 1882; Bendigo, Victoria
- Died: 5 February 1953 (aged 70); Balwyn, Victoria
- Original team: Bendigo

Playing career^{1}
Years	Club	Games (Goals)
1908–09	Melbourne	18 (1)
- ^{1} Playing statistics correct to the end of 1909.

Henry Manly Derward Wright (24 February 1882 – 5 February 1953) was an Australian rules footballer who played with Melbourne in the Victorian Football League (VFL).
