= Henry Parks Wright =

First dean of Yale University

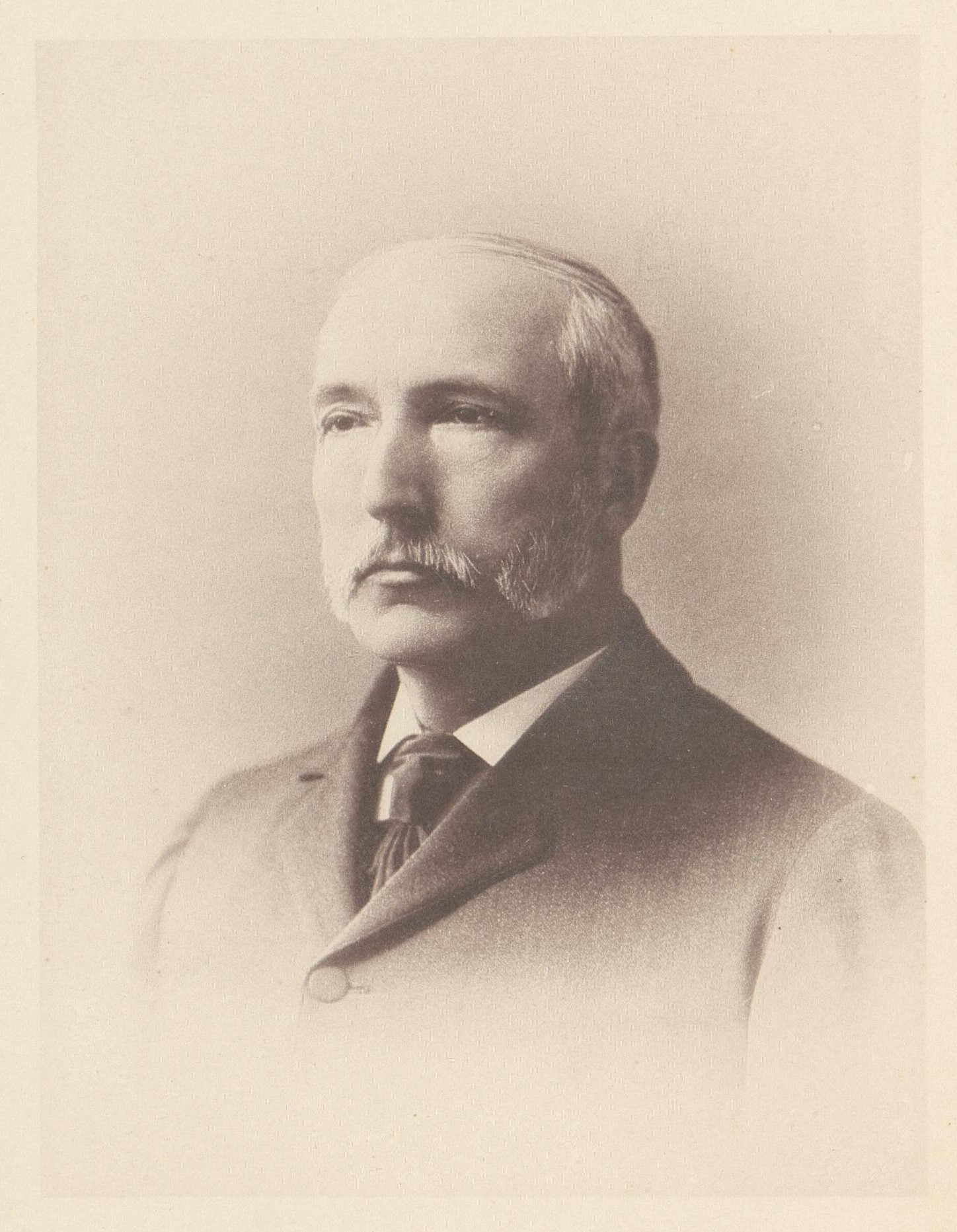
- Born: November 30, 1839; Winchester, New Hampshire, U.S.
- Died: March 17, 1918 (aged 78); New Haven Connecticut, U.S.
- Education: Yale University
- Occupation: Teacher

Henry Parks Wright (1839–1918) was an American teacher and professor who became the first college dean of Yale University.

== Biography ==
=== Youth and studies ===
Henry Parks Wright was born in Winchester, New Hampshire. His father died when he was a few weeks old, and his mother when he was 3. He was then raised in Oakham, Massachusetts by his grandmother, Mrs Hannah Wooley, and became a schoolteacher at 17. Although he had earned enough to attend Phillips Academy in Andover, he decided to stop studying and to join the Union army in 1862. He was nearly 25 when he entered Yale in 1864, graduated as valedictorian of the Class of 1868. After teaching for one year in the Chickering Institute in Cincinnati, he was appointed Tutor in Yale College, starting a 40-year career in the Yale faculty. He became an assistant professor of Latin in Yale in 1871, pursued graduate study and received a doctorate in 1876.

=== Family ===
On 7 July 1874, he married Martha Elizabeth Burt. Their four children were:

- Alice Lincoln, born in 1875, who received a PhD from Yale in 1901 and became a teacher of English in the State Normal School in New Haven;
- Henry Burt, born in 1877, who became a famous theology professor at Yale University;
- Alfred Parks, born in 1880, who died in 1901 while in senior class in Yale;
- Ellsworth, born in 1884.

=== Career as dean of Yale College ===
In 1884, he was appointed Dean of Yale College and served in that capacity for the next 25 years. Until 1884, Yale had functioned without a dean, but with enrollment approaching 1,100, President Noah Porter asked Wright to help him by taking over the records of the junior and senior classes. For the first two years Wright kept all of the records without help, while teaching a full schedule as Dunham Professor of Latin Language and Literature.

Undergraduate life changed dramatically during Wright’s deanship. From 1884 to 1894, the college enrollment had doubled to 1,150, forcing the freshmen to room off campus. This had led to the opening of privately owned residence halls around the campus, some of which were very luxurious. Over time, the students became widely separated by income and social standing. Wright felt that if the spirit of true democracy at Yale were to be perpetuated, it was essential that freshmen should be better integrated to the College and the University. The alumni committee of “Wright’s boys” responded by raising funds for a dormitory that for the first time would be a cooperative gift, rather than one person or family. There were many rich and poor contributors. A part of the funds raised was earmarked to provide a life pension for Wright.

An elegant Gothic hall designed by architect William Adams Delano, Class of 1895, was built in the place of Alumni Hall in 1911-1912. Accommodating 150, it was the largest dormitory on the Old Campus. The hall was also a memorial to others; two entries, five classrooms and twenty-five rooms were donated and named after deceased alumni. One suite was named for Wright’s son Alfred Parks Wright, Class of 1901, who died in May of his senior year. This building completed the new quadrangle begun with Farnam Hall in 1869.

On November 23, 1912, a few hours before the Yale-Harvard game, a group of alumni gathered to dedicate Wright Memorial Hall on the Old Campus in honor of Henry Parks Wright, in a significant break from tradition since the new residence and lecture hall (which was renamed Lanman-Wright Hall in 1993) became the first building at Yale to be named in honor of a living person. But 25 classes had cherished Wright’s counsel and friendship, and upon his retirement in 1909, they came together to fund an edifice that would fulfill Wright’s dream of unifying undergraduate life.

=== End of life ===
He retired in 1909 and died in New Haven, Connecticut on 17 March 1918.

== Recognition and distinctions ==
Henry P. Wright was a trustee of the Connecticut College for Women at New London and of the Hopkins Grammar School at New Haven. He was a member of the Committee on the Civil War Memorial erected at Yale.

At Wright’s retirement, a Yale professor said that Henry P. Wright had introduced “a new era” in student-faculty relations. “ To arbitrate between a large body of impulsive young men and a College Faculty, is no light matter. We all know how volcanic is the one, and how full of horned cattle is the other.”

During the construction of Wright Hall in 1911, a poignant testimonial by a former student was published in The Heir of Slaves, by William Pickens, Class of 1904: “Dean Henry P. Wright of Yale, after reading the recommendations of my former teachers, had written that I could enter the junior class. This great scholar and good man has been a constant friend since that first acquaintance.”
