= Henry Burt Wright =

American professor (1877–1923)

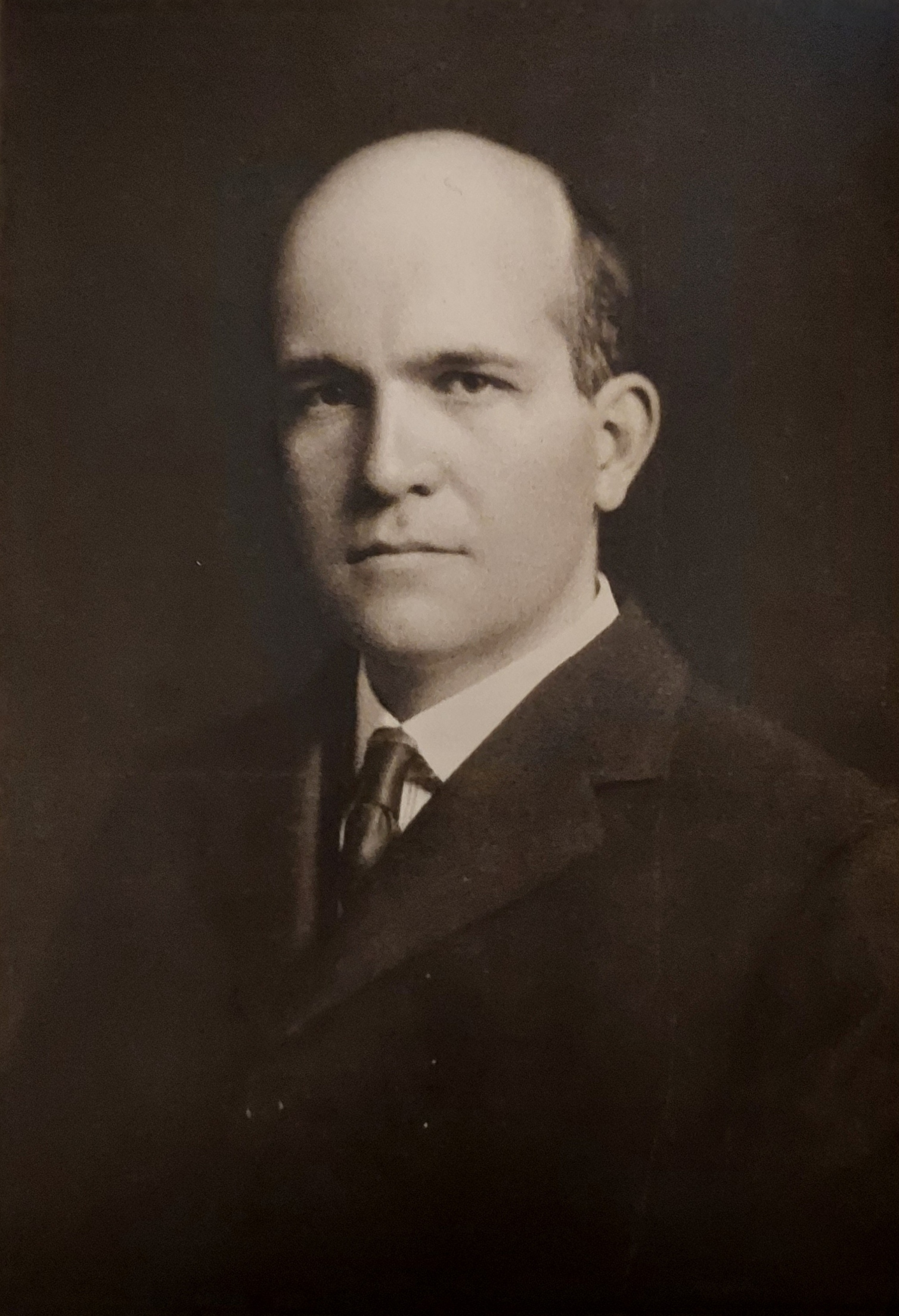
Pr Henry B. Wright (1877–1923), from Yale University

Henry Burt Wright (1877–1923) was an American professor from Yale University whose writings influenced, among others, Frank Buchman, and subsequently the work he developed under the name of Oxford Group, later Moral Rearmament.

== Biography ==
Henry Burt Wright was born on January 29, 1877, in New Haven, Connecticut. He was the second son of Henry Parks Wright, who was the first dean of Yale University and of Martha Burt.

His academic career included a BA in 1898 and a PhD in 1903, both from Yale. He became a tutor of Greek and Latin in Yale from 1903 to 1906, instructor from 1906 to 1907, assistant professor of Roman history and Latin literature from 1908 to 1911, assistant professor of history from 1911 to 1914 and, from 1914 on, Stephen M. Clement Professor of Christian Methods at Yale Divinity School.

While studying, he was the secretary of the Yale YMCA from 1898 to 1901. He was also an army YMCA chaplain at Camp Deven in 1917–1918. Henry Burt Wright married Josephine L. Hayward on July 24, 1907. He died in Oakham on December 27, 1923.

== Legacy ==
While Henry Burt Wright is quoted as having had a strong influence on thousands of students in Yale University, his influence was made wider by the publication of his book The Will of God and A Man's Lifework (New York: Association Press, 1924). It was copyrighted in 1909. Its studies were originally prepared by laymen to meet the needs of students in the Association Bible Classes for Seniors of the Academic and Scientific Departments of Yale University.

Several writers have pointed out that Henry B. Wright had been one of the major influences on Oxford Group founder Dr. Frank N.D. Buchman. While based at Hartford, teaching and gathering his team, Buchman used to travel four hours each way, once a week, to attend Wright's lectures at Yale. Many of the ideas later promoted by Buchman appear to be borrowed from Wright.

The Yale Dininity School chair of systematic theology is named after him. The current holder of Yale University's Henry B. Wright Professor of Systematic Theology chair is Croatian Protestant theologian Miroslav Volf.
