= Harry Wright (footballer, born 1900) =

English footballer

Harold "Harry" Wright (born 5 April 1900) was an English professional footballer of the 1920s. Born in Staveley, he joined Gillingham from Welbeck Colliery in 1920 and went on to make 33 appearances for the club in The Football League, after which he returned to the colliery team. In 1922, he joined Bradford City, where he played for five years before joining Staveley Town in November 1927.
