= Howard Clinebell =

American Methodist minister (1922–2005)

The Reverend Howard John Clinebell
- Born: 3 June 1922; Springfield, Illinois
- Died: 13 April 2005 (aged 82); Santa Barbara
- Education: DePauw University; Garrett Theological Seminary; Columbia University
- Occupations: Methodist minister and professor in pastoral counseling
- Spouse: Charlotte H. Clinebell
- Parent(s): Howard J. Clinebell and Clem (Whittenberg) Clinebell

Howard John Clinebell Jr. (June 3, 1922 – April 13, 2005) was an American Christian minister in the United Methodist Church and a professor in pastoral counseling. He pioneered a counseling approach that combined psychotherapy and religion.

== Early life and education ==
Howard Clinebell was born in Springfield, Illinois, on June 3, 1922, to Howard J. and Clem (Whittenberg) Clinebell. He graduated from DePauw University in Indiana and Garrett Theological Seminary in Illinois, and he received a doctorate from Columbia University. In addition he studied psychotherapy at the William Alanson White Institute in New York City.

== Career ==
In the mid-1950s Clinebell joined the staff at the First United Methodist Church in Pasadena. He went on to become counselor at Methodist Hospital in Arcadia. In 1959 he joined Claremont School of Theology as a professor of pastoral psychology. Clinebell retired in 1988.

Clinebell is author or co-author of more than 20 books of which the most influential are "Understanding and Counseling the Alcoholic Through Religion and Psychology" (1956) and "Basic Types of Pastoral Counseling" (1966, revised edition "Basic Types of Pastoral Care and Counseling" 1984). With his book on counseling of alcoholics Clinebell introduced the concept to view alcoholism as a disease rather than a character deficiency in religious circles. Clinebell also wrote an influential book on the spiritual aspects of environmentalism in 1996, "Ecotherapy: Healing Ourselves, Healing the Earth."

As one of the fathers of the pastoral counseling movement Clinebell was an early advocate of training in psychotherapy for seminarians aiming to work as counselors. He was a founding member of the American Association of Pastoral Counselors, along with the group Pastoral Counselors for Social Responsibility. He was also the founding director of the Institute for Religion and Wholeness at Claremont and the Clinebell Institute. In addition, he was a licensed marriage, family, and child counselor.

Besides pastoral counseling, Clinebell addressed topics like personal problems in the context of relationships, the effects of social systems on individual lives, parapsychology, and the relationship of human beings to the environment.

== Personal life and death ==
Clinebell was married to Charlotte Clinebell for almost 60 years, and had three children. He died April 13, 2005, of complications from Parkinson's disease at Vista del Monte Retirement Community in Santa Barbara.

== Works ==
- Clinebell, Howard J. (1966). Basic Types of Pastoral Counseling. Nashville: Abingdon Press. ISBN 9780687024919.
- Clinebell, Howard J. (1984). Basic Types of Pastoral Care and Counseling: Resources for the Ministry of Healing and Growth. Nashville: Abingdon Press. ISBN 0-68702-492-7.
- Clinebell, Howard J. (1968). Understanding and Counseling the alcoholic through Religion and Psychology. Nashville: Abingdon Press. ISBN 9780687428014.
- Clinebell, Howard J.; Clinebell, Charlotte H. (1970). The Intimate Marriage. New York: Harper & Row.
- Clinebell, Howard J.; Clinebell, Charlotte H. (1971). Crisis and Growth: Helping Your Troubled Child. Fortress Press. ISBN 9780800611040.
- Clinebell, Howard J. (1972). The People Dynamic: Changing Self and Society through Growth Groups. New York: Harper & Row. ISBN 0-06061-500-1.
- Clinebell, Howard J. (1977). Growth Counseling for Mid-Years Couples. Fortress Press. ISBN 9780800605582.
- Clinebell, Howard J. (1979). Growth Counseling: Hope-Centered Methods of Actualizing Human Wholeness. Abingdon. ISBN 9780687159741.
- Clinebell, Howard J. (1992). Well Being: A Personal Plan for Exploring and Enriching the Seven Dimensions of Life: Mind, Body, Spirit, Love, Work, Play, the Earth. HarperSanFrancisco. ISBN 9780060615031.
- Clinebell, Howard J. (1995). Counseling for Spiritually Empowered Wholeness: A Hope-Centered Approach. Routledge. doi:10.4324/9781315870311. ISBN 9781560249030.
- Clinebell, Howard J. (1996). Ecotherapy: Healing Ourselves, Healing the Earth. Haworth Press. ISBN 9780789060082.
