= Frank Buchman =

American Lutheran theologian (1878–1961)

The Reverend Frank Buchman
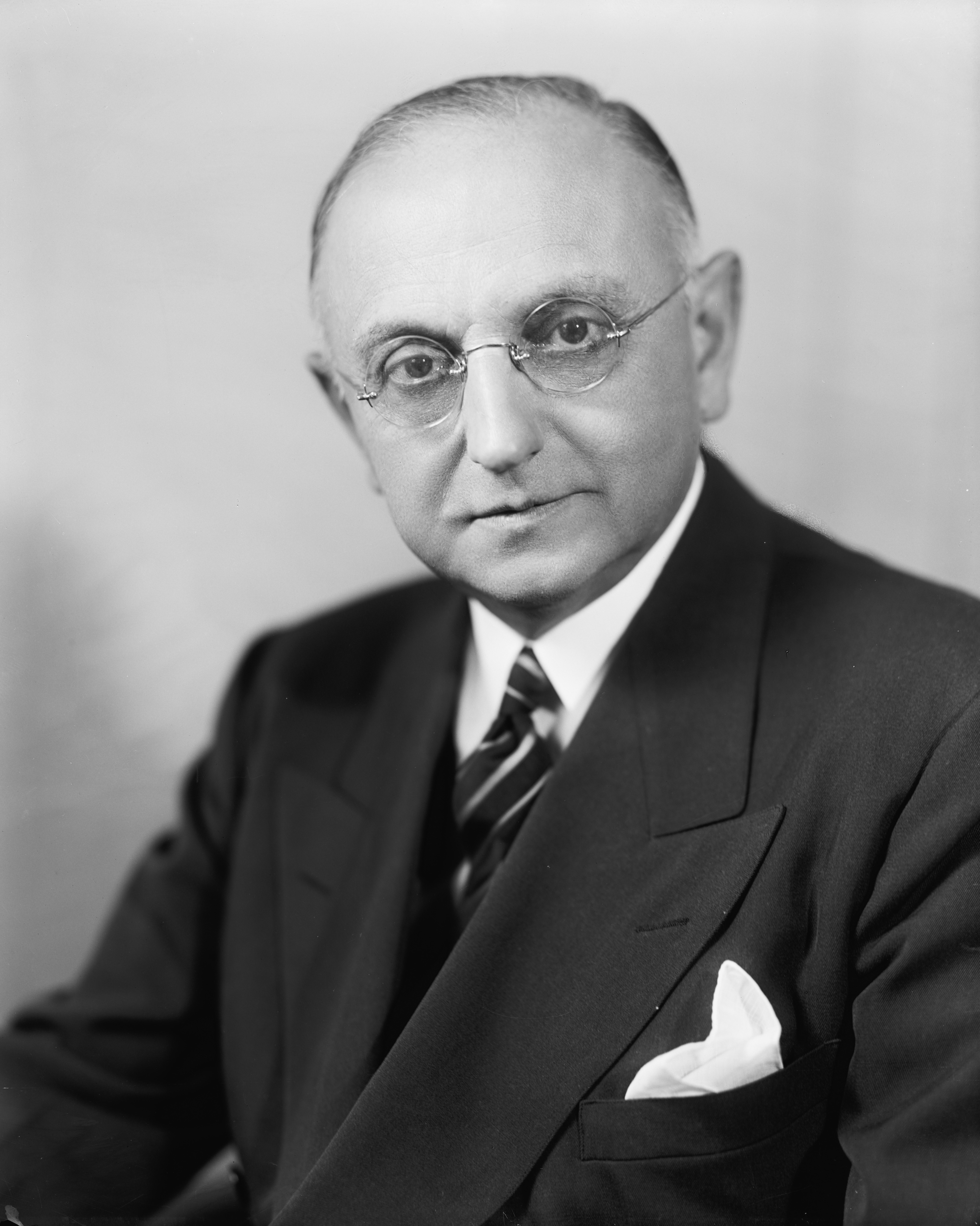
- Buchman, c. 1945
- Born: Franklin Nathaniel Daniel Buchman; June 4, 1878; Pennsburg, Pennsylvania, U.S.
- Died: August 7, 1961 (aged 83); Freudenstadt, West Germany
- Known for: Founding leader of the Oxford Group

Pennsylvania Historical Marker
- Official name: Frank N.D. Buchman
- Type: Roadside
- Designated: October 19, 1991
- Location: 772 Main St. (PA Route 29) near 8th St., Pennsburg, Pennsylvania

Franklin Nathaniel Daniel Buchman (June 4, 1878 – August 7, 1961), best known as Frank Buchman, was an American Lutheran who founded the First Century Christian Fellowship in 1921, renamed as the Oxford Group in 1928, that was transformed under his leadership in 1938 into the Moral Re-Armament and became Initiatives of Change in 2001. As a leader of the Moral Re-Armament, he was decorated by the French and German governments for his contributions to Franco-German reconciliation following the end of World War II.

== Early life and education ==
Buchman was born on June 4, 1878, in Pennsburg, Pennsylvania, the son of Sarah (Greenwalt) and Franklin Buchman, a farmer, then hotelier, restaurateur, and eventually wholesale drinks salesman. His mother was a pious Lutheran.

At age sixteen, circa 1894, he moved with his parents to Allentown to enter high school and then attended Muhlenberg College, where he graduated. He then moved to Philadelphia to enter Mount Airy Lutheran Seminary and was ordained a Lutheran minister in June 1902.

== Career ==
Buchman had hoped to be called to an important city church, but eventually accepted a call to Overbrook, a growing section of Philadelphia that did not yet have a Lutheran church building. No salary was given him the day he was ordained. He arranged the rental of an old storefront for worship space, settled upstairs, and opened the Church of the Good Shepherd. After a year of spending himself entirely on his work, he was so exhausted that his doctor prescribed a long holiday and he sailed to Europe where he visited Italy, Switzerland, and Germany. On his return, he decided to establish a home for young people in need in Overbrook, along the lines of Friedrich von Bodelschwingh's colony of hospital farms and workshops for the mentally ill in Bielefeld and of Canon Barnett's Toynbee Hall. However, conflict developed with the board of the new Luther hospice for young men. In Buchman's recollection, the dispute was due to the board's unwillingness to fund the hospice adequately. However, the Finance Committee of the Ministerium of Pennsylvania, which oversaw the budget, had no funds with which to make up an ongoing deficit and wanted the hospice to be self-supporting. Buchman resigned.

Exhausted and depressed, Buchman took his doctor's advice of a long holiday abroad. Still in turmoil over his hospice resignation, Buchman attended the 1908 Keswick Convention in England hoping to meet the renowned Quaker-influenced, Baptist evangelist F. B. Meyer (1847–1929), who he believed might be able to help him. Meyer was not there, but in a small half-empty chapel he listened to Jessie Penn-Lewis preach on the Cross of Christ, which led to a religious experience.

I thought of those six men back in Philadelphia who I felt had wronged me. They probably had, but I'd got so mixed up in the wrong that I was the seventh wrong man. ... I began to see myself as God saw me, which was a very different picture than the one I had of myself. I don't know how you explain it, I can only tell you I sat there and realized how my sin, my pride, my selfishness and my ill-will, had eclipsed me from God in Christ. ... I was the center of my own life. That big "I" had to be crossed out. I saw my resentments against those men standing out like tombstones in my heart. I asked God to change me and He told me to put things right with them. It produced in me a vibrant feeling, as though a strong current of life had suddenly been poured into me and afterwards a dazed sense of a great spiritual shaking-up.

Buchman wrote letters of apology to the six board members asking their forgiveness for harboring ill will. Buchman regarded this as a foundation experience and in later years frequently referred to it with his followers.

=== YMCA ===
From 1909 to 1915, Buchman was YMCA secretary at Penn State College. Despite quickly more than doubling the YMCA membership to 75% of the student body, he was dissatisfied, questioning how deep the changes went. Alcohol consumption in the college, for example, was unaffected. During this time he began the practice of a daily "quiet time". Buchman finally got to meet Frederick Brotherton Meyer, who when visiting the college asked Buchman, "Do you let the Holy Spirit guide you in all you are doing?" Buchman replied that he did indeed pray and read the Bible in the morning. "But," persisted Meyer, "do you give God enough uninterrupted time really to tell you what to do?"

Another decisive influence appears to have been Yale University theology professor Henry Burt Wright (1877–1923) and his 1909 book The Will of God and a Man's Lifework, which was itself influenced by Frederick Brotherton Meyer and Henry Drummond, among others.

Buchman's devotion to "personal evangelism", and his skill at re-framing the Christian message in contemporary terms, were admired by other campus ministry leaders. Maxwell Chaplin, YMCA secretary at Princeton University, wrote, after attending one of the Buchman's annual "Y[MCA] Week" campaigns: "In five years the permanent [YMCA] secretary at Penn State has entirely changed the tone of that one-time tough college." Lloyd Douglas, author of The Robe took part in the same campaign. "It was," he wrote afterwards, "the most remarkable event of its kind I ever witnessed. ... One after another, prominent fraternity men ... stood up before their fellows and confessed that they had been living poor, low-grade lives and from henceforth meant to be good."

In 1915, Buchman's YMCA work took him to India with evangelist Sherwood Eddy. There he met, briefly, Mahatma Gandhi (the first of many meetings), and became friends with Rabindranath Tagore and Amy Carmichael, founder of the Dohnavur Fellowship. Despite speaking to audiences of up to 60,000, Buchman was critical of the large-scale approach, describing it as "like hunting rabbits with a brass band."

From February to August 1916 Buchman worked with the YMCA mission in China, returning to Pennsylvania due to the increasing illness of his father.

=== Hartford Theological Seminary and missionary in China ===
Buchman next took a part-time post at Hartford Theological Seminary in Hartford, Connecticut, where he began to gather a group of men to assist in the conversion of China to Christianity. He was asked to lead missionary conferences at Guling and Beidaihe, which he saw as an opportunity to train native Chinese leaders at a time when many missionaries held attitudes of white superiority. Through his friendship with Xu Qian (vice-minister of justice and later acting prime minister,) he got to know Sun Yat-sen. However, his criticism of other missionaries in China, with an implication that sin, including homosexuality, was keeping some of them from being effective, led to conflict. Bishop Logan Roots, deluged with complaints, asked Buchman to leave China in 1918.

While still based at Hartford, Buchman spent much of his time traveling and forming groups of Christian students at Princeton University, Yale University, and the University of Oxford. Sam Shoemaker, a Princeton University graduate and one-time secretary of the Philadelphian Society who had met Buchman in China, became one of his leading American disciples. In 1922, after a prolonged spell with students at the University of Cambridge, Buchman resigned his position at Hartford, and thereafter relied on gifts from patrons such as Margaret (née Thorne) Tjader.

Shortly after, he founded the First Century Christian Fellowship.

=== Interaction with Romanian royalty ===
In June 1924, shortly after arriving in Europe on the SS Paris, Buchman accepted an invitation to meet with King George II of Greece and his family in Italy. The king’s mother, Sophie of Prussia, requested that Buchman visit her daughter Helen, wife of Crown Prince Carol of Romania, the future Carol II of Romania, in Bucharest. Carol’s mother, Queen Marie of Romania, invited Buchman to join her and her husband, King Ferdinand, at Peles Castle, where they were joined by Buchman’s close associate, Loudon Hamilton. When Hamilton was asked by both Queen Marie and her daughter-in-law, Crown Princess Helen, if he would accept the position of tutor to Helen’s young son Michael, the future King Michael, neither Hamilton or Buchman felt that he should accept.

In early 1926, Marie and Ferdinand were distressed by events concerning their eldest son, Crown Prince Carol, whose personal life had obliged him to renounce his succession rights to the throne a year earlier, his name being removed from the royal house of Romania by King Ferdinand. In March 1926, American friends of Queen Marie living in Turkey suggested that Buchman should spend time with her at Cotroceni Palace, offering his services as both spiritual guide and confidant, and “spreading his kind, uniting atmosphere over us all”.

Later in the year, as Buchman was preparing to return to the United States, he received a cable from Marie proposing that they travel to New York City together on the same boat, and on October 12, they set sail from France on the Leviathan. Queen Marie was accompanied by her youngest children, Prince Nicholas and Princess Ileana. During their time together on the voyage, Queen Marie expressed her wish to demonstrate publicly the debt she felt to Buchman, with Nicholas suggesting that a house party be arranged for that purpose. A reception was organized to take place at the New York residence provided for Buchman’s stay, and he sent a cable stating, “Queen accepts tea twenty-fourth Ileana Nicholas accompany”.

By the time October 24 arrived, Buchman found himself facing challenges in regard to his work, fueled by magazine articles and press reports. Queen Marie and her family were also facing challenges, pressured by their official host, William Nelson Cromwell, to cold shoulder Buchman, whom they considered a valued friend. Despite mounting criticism, the reception took place as planned, and although Prince Nicholas attended, his mother, Queen Marie, did not. According to the New York Herald Tribune, Buchman phoned Queen Marie, arranging a brief audience for his guests at her hotel and supplying each of them with a blank card on which he had written, "Ambassador Hotel to meet Queen Marie".

A month later, Queen Marie returned to Romania to be with King Ferdinand, who was suffering from a terminal illness. Correspondence with Buchman continued briefly, her last letter to him dated April 15, 1927, and addressed to "Uncle Frank". Part of Buchman’s reply stated, “What hope is there for royalty or anyone else but rebirth?… Can this 'still, small voice' be the deciding factor in political situations, such as face you in these days of crisis?… Let me say, with the utmost conviction, it is the only thing that will …. With the rarest sense of fellowship with you… Your devoted friend.”

=== Oxford Group ===
Buchman designed a strategy of holding "house parties" at various locations, during which he hoped for Christian commitment to his First Century Christian Fellowship among those attending.

In Oxford, England, men trained by Buchman began holding regular lunchtime meetings in the study of J. Thornton-Duesbery, then chaplain of Corpus Christi College, Oxford. By 1928, numbers had grown so large that the meetings moved to the ballroom of the Randolph Hotel, before being invited to use the library of the Oxford University church, St Mary's.

In response to criticism by Tom Driberg in his first scoop in the Daily Express that this "strange new sect" involved members holding hands in a circle and publicly confessing their sins (a fabrication according to those who were there), the Daily Express printed a statement by Canon L.W. Grensted, chaplain and fellow of University College and a university lecturer in psychology bearing "testimony not only to [their] general sanity ... but also to [their] real effectiveness. Men whom I have known ... have not only found a stronger faith and a new happiness, but have also made definite progress in the quality of their study, and in their athletics too."

In the summer of 1928, six of these Oxford men traveled for the vacations to South Africa, where they originated. There, the press, at a loss how to describe this new religious movement, coined the term Oxford Group. Between 1931 and 1935, around 150 Oxford undergraduates were attending Oxford Group meetings every lunchtime. Paul Hodder-Williams, of the publishing firm Hodder and Stoughton, arranged for a regular column about the group to appear in the firm's magazine, the British Weekly. In 1932, Hodder also published a book about the group: For Sinners Only by A.J. Russell, managing editor of the Sunday Express, which went through 17 editions in two years and was translated widely. During university vacations, teams from Oxford took part in campaigns in East London and other industrial areas. Meanwhile, the numbers attending "house parties" grew to several thousands.

Buchman traveled widely in Europe during the 1930s. With the rise of the Nazis, he focused on Germany, holding house parties and meeting church leaders. In 1932 and again in 1933 he sought, unsuccessfully, to meet with Adolf Hitler, whom he hoped to convert. By 1934, the Oxford Group's activities in Germany were being spied on and prominent members interrogated, making effective work under Hitler's regime increasingly difficult. In response, Buchman switched his focus to Scandinavia, believing that demonstrating a Christian revolution there would have a great impact in Germany.

Accepting an invitation from Carl Hambro, he led a team to Norway in 1934. The Oslo daily Tidens Tegn commented in its Christmas edition, "A handful of foreigners who neither knew our language, nor understood our ways and customs came to the country. A few days later the whole country was talking about God, and two months after the thirty foreigners arrived, the mental outlook of the whole country was definitely changed." In 1935 Bishop Berggrav of Tromsø said that "what is now happening in Norway is the biggest spiritual movement since the reformation." Major splits between conservative and liberal factions in the church were healed, paving the way for more effective church opposition to Nazi rule during the war. A campaign in Denmark a year later had a similar impact. Speaking to the World Council of Churches in Evanston, Illinois, in 1954, the Bishop of Copenhagen, Fuglsang-Damgaard, reported: "The visit of Frank Buchman to Denmark in 1935 was an historic experience in the story of the Danish Church. It will be written in letters of gold in the history of the Church and the nation."

Buchman attended the 1935 Nuremberg Rally. In 1936, the Central Security Office of the Gestapo sent out a document warning that the Oxford Group was "a new and dangerous opponent of National Socialism". This was followed by a 126-page report in 1939 claiming that the Oxford Group was "the pacemaker of Anglo-American diplomacy" and that "the Group as a whole constitutes an attack upon the nationalism of the state. ... It preaches revolution against the national state and has quite evidently become its Christian opponent."

== Moral Re-Armament ==
In 1938, as nations were rearming for World War II, a Swedish socialist and Oxford Group member named Harry Blomberg, wrote of the need to re-arm morally. Buchman liked the term, and launched a campaign for Moral and Spiritual Re-Armament in East London. More than just a new name for the Oxford Group, Moral Re-Armament (MRA) signaled a new commitment on Buchman's part to try to change the course of nations. In a speech to thousands on the Swedish island of Visby, he said: "I am not interested, nor do I think it adequate, if we are going to begin just to start another revival. Whatever thoughtful statesman you talk to will tell you that every country needs a moral and spiritual awakening." Referring to the Spanish Civil War, he continued: "I find here the same sort of inflammable matter that made Spain possible. Unless we and others see the bigger vision of spiritual revolution, the other may be possible." At this point, some who had been active with the Oxford Group ceased working with Buchman, uncomfortable with what they saw as a new "political" direction.

=== War work ===
During World War II, MRA's efforts were valued by U.S. President Franklin D. Roosevelt as a contribution to morale. At this time MRA started what became an extensive use of theatrical reviews and plays to convey its message. A play, You Can Defend America, based on an MRA booklet of the same name which called for "sound homes – teamwork in industry – a united nation", toured through 21 states and performed before more than a quarter of a million people. In Britain, novelist Daphne du Maurier wrote a best-selling book, which she titled Come Wind, Come Weather and dedicated to Buchman, telling stories of how ordinary people affected by MRA were facing up to wartime conditions.

Buchman and his team were in San Francisco at the time of the first United Nations conference in 1945. A dispute over the "Trusteeship Chapter" in the proposed UN Charter was averted by the change in General Romulo, attributed to MRA.

=== Centers ===
From 1942 to 1971, MRA had a base on Mackinac Island, Michigan. In 1946, Swiss supporters bought the derelict Caux Palace Hotel in the village of Caux, above Lake Geneva for use as a conference center. From 1946 to 1999, the Westminster Theatre served as the London base for MRA, continuing the tradition of using plays and reviews to promote its message.

=== Post-war reconciliation ===
After World War II, MRA played a significant role in enabling reconciliation between France and Germany, through its conferences in Caux and its work in the coal and steel industries of both countries. German Chancellor Konrad Adenauer was a regular visitor to the MRA conferences in Caux, and Buchman facilitated meetings between Robert Schuman, French Foreign Minister, and Adenauer. Buchman was awarded the Croix de Chevalier of the Légion d'honneur by the French government, and also the German Grand Cross of the Order of Merit for this work. Buchman's contact with surviving anti-Nazi Germans, stemming from his pre-war work in Germany, was an important factor in facilitating this reconciliation.

MRA facilitated some of the first large delegations of Japanese to travel abroad after the war. In 1950, a delegation of 76, including members of Parliament from all the main parties, seven governors of prefectures, the mayors of Hiroshima and Nagasaki and leaders of industry, finance, and labor traveled to the MRA center in Caux, and from there to the United States, where their senior representative, Chorijuo Kurijama, spoke in the United States Senate, where he apologized "for Japan's big mistake". In 1957, Prime Minister Kishi made historic apologies in nine of Japan's Southeast Asian neighbors, significantly improving relationships. Returning to Tokyo, he told the media, "I have been impressed by the effectiveness of Moral Re-Armament in creating unity between peoples who have been divided. I have myself experienced the power of honest apology in healing the hurts of the past."

=== Decolonization ===
MRA played an important role in the peaceful decolonization of Morocco and Tunisia. In 1956, King Mohammed V of Morocco wrote to Buchman, "I thank you for all you have done for Morocco, the Moroccans and myself in the course of these last testing years. Moral Re-Armament must become for us Muslims just as much an incentive as it is for you Christians and for all nations." In December of that year, President Habib Bourguiba of Tunisia declared: "The world must be told what Moral Re-Armament has done for our country." But attempts to provide similar mediation in Algeria failed.

In 1955, Buchman suggested to a group of African leaders from several countries meeting in Caux that they put what they had learned of MRA into a play. The play, Freedom, was written within 48 hours and first performed at the Westminster Theatre a week later, before touring the world and being made into a full-length color film. In Kenya, the film was shown to the imprisoned Jomo Kenyatta, who asked that it be dubbed into Swahili. The film was shown to a million Kenyans in the months before the first election. In the spring of 1961, The Reporter of Nairobi wrote: "MRA has done a great deal to stabilize our recent election campaign."

== Psychology and spirituality ==
Remaking The World, the title of Buchman's collected speeches, was central to Buchman's vision.

The Oxford Group is a Christian revolution for remaking the world. The root problems in the world today are dishonesty, selfishness and fear – in men and, consequently, in nations. These evils multiplied result in divorce, crime, unemployment, recurrent depression and war. How can we hope for peace within a nation, or between nations, when we have conflict in countless homes? Spiritual recovery must precede economic recovery. Political or social solutions that do not deal with these root problems are inadequate.

In order to "remake the world", people had to change:

Everybody wants to see the other fellow changed. Every nation wants to see the other nation changed. But everybody is waiting for the other fellow to begin. The Oxford Group is convinced that if you want an answer for the world today, the best place to start with is with yourself. This is the first and fundamental need.

Launching a campaign for "Moral Re-Armament" in East Ham Town Hall in 1938, Buchman said:

We need a power strong enough to change human nature and build bridges between man and man, faction and faction. This starts when everyone admits his own faults instead of spot-lighting the other fellow's. God alone can change human nature. The secret lies in that great forgotten truth, that when man listens, God speaks; when man obeys, God acts; when men change, nations change.

Drawing on his experiences in Penn State and China, Buchman advocated personal work with individuals that would go deep enough to deal with root motives and desires. Asked on a ship to China how he helped individuals, Buchman replied with the "five C's:" Confidence, Confession, Conviction, Conversion, and Continuance.

Nothing could be done unless the other person had "Confidence" in you, and knew that you could keep confidences. "Confession" meant getting honest about the real state of affairs behind the public persona. This would lead to a "Conviction" of sin, a desire to change, leading in turn to "Conversion", a decision of the will to live God's way. He felt that the most neglected "C" was "Continuance", the ongoing support of people who had decided to change. One additional aspect of becoming a free person was the need to make restitution and to put right, as far as possible, any wrong done. If the sin was a public one, restitution might involve making a public confession.

Buchman always stressed that "life changing" was not a matter of technique so much as the natural result of asking God for direction. God alone could change a person and the role of the "life changer" was to listen in silence for the "still small voice" of God.

Foundational to Buchman's spirituality was the practice of a daily "quiet time" during which, he claimed, anyone could search for, and receive, "divine guidance" on every aspect of their life. Because of the dangers of self-deception leading a person to mistake their own will, or shadow, for the will of God, Buchman proposed a "six-fold test" of the thoughts which came in the quiet time: 1. Look for a willingness to obey, without self-interested editing. 2. Watch and see if circumstances intervene to make the thought impractical. 3. Compare the thoughts against the highest moral standards of absolute honesty, absolute purity, absolute unselfishness and absolute love. 4. Is the thought consistent with Holy Scripture? 5. Get the advice of trusted friends. 6. Draw on the experience and teaching of the Church.

The founders of Alcoholics Anonymous, William "Bill W." Wilson and Bob Smith, were both active members in the Oxford Group and believed that the principles of the Oxford Group were the key to overcoming alcoholism. Psychologist Howard Clinebell called Buchman "one of the foremost pioneers of the modern mutual-assistance philosophy". Swiss psychologist and author Paul Tournier said: "The whole development of group therapy in medicine cannot all be traced back to Frank [Buchman], but he historically personified that new beginning, ending a chapter of the purely rational and opening a new era when the emotional and irrational also were taken into account." Referring to Buchman's effect on the Church, Tournier observed: "Before Buchman the Church felt its job was to teach and preach, but not to find out what was happening in people's souls. The clergy never listened in church, they always talked. There is still too much talking, but silence has returned. Frank helped to show again that the power of silence is the power of God."

== Attitude to other religions ==
Buchman's willingness to work with people of different religions without demand that they convert to Christianity was often a source of confusion and conflict with other Christians. In a speech in 1948, he said: "MRA is the good road of an ideology inspired by God upon which all can unite. Catholic, Jew and Protestant, Hindu, Muslim, Buddhist and Confucianist - all find they can change, where needed, and travel along this good road together." He had several meetings over the years with Mohandas Karamchand Gandhi, whom he greatly respected, saying: "The sphere of his usefulness will be sainthood, and a compelling one at that." He also expressed the hope that Muslim countries should become "a belt of sanity to bind East and West and bring moral rebirth."

Yet according to his biographer, Garth Lean, Buchman would always give those at his gatherings, whatever their faith or lack of it, "the deepest Christian truths he knew, often centered round the story of how he himself had been washed clean from his hatreds by his experience of the Cross at Keswick and how Christ had become his nearest friend. This was done with the utmost urgency - that everyone must face the reality of their own sin, and find change and forgiveness. But he never added that those in his audience must break with their traditions, or join this or that church."

== Buchman and communism ==
After his early experiences in China, Buchman believed that the failure of the vast Western missionary effort in China enabled an alternative set of beliefs, communism, to take root. In his subsequent work in British and American universities, he found that communism was a potent and attractive force. Though he did admire the boldness, and the passion for change, of communists, he believed that communism was inadequate because he found it to be built on moral relativism and militantly anti-God. A frequent theme became that the commitment and strategic ideology of communism must be matched by equally committed and strategic forces working for God. After visiting South America in the early 1930s, he told some of the young people working with the Oxford Group: "In one country I was told two young Communists had made it their duty to attach themselves to each Cabinet Minister to win him to the Party line. Which of you will plan as thoroughly to bring a Christian revolution to your leaders?"

Buchman believed that both fascism and communism had their roots in materialism, which he called "the mother of all '-isms'" and, as such, materialism was democracy's greatest enemy: "People get confused as to whether it is a question of being Rightist or Leftist. But the one thing we really need is to be guided by God's Holy Spirit. That is the Force we ought to study. ... The Holy Spirit will teach us how to think and live, and provide a working basis of our national service. ... The true battle line in the world today is not between class and class, not between race and race. The battle is between Christ and anti-Christ."

After Nikita Khrushchev's 1956 denunciation of Stalinism and the apparent thawing of relationships with the West, MRA produced a pamphlet, "Ideology and Co-Existence", alerting the West to the strategies and tactics of communism. It was translated into 24 languages and became the most widely distributed publication which MRA ever produced, giving rise to a popular perception of Buchman and MRA as being primarily anti-communist, and, therefore, right-wing. In the 1950s, he told a colleague: "If Britain and America were to defeat Communism today, the world would be in a worse state than it is. Because the other man is wrong doesn't make me right."

In the late 1940s, the coal mines and factories of Germany's heavily industrialized Ruhr Area were an ideological battleground. Communists expected to gain control of the workers' councils as part of their plan to turn Germany into a communist-run state. Many of these workers' leaders were among the 120,000 from the Ruhr who saw the MRA play The Forgotten Factor. Employers also changed their attitudes and methods in this time. Some communist bureaucrats from the area embraced MRA and were summoned to account for themselves at the Communist Party headquarters for North Rhine-Westphalia. There, they recommended that the Party should make itself acquainted with MRA and "take the next step of its development by facing up to the moral standards of absolute honesty, purity, unselfishness, and love", supporting their contention with quotations from Marx and Engels. But their approach was rejected, and the men were expelled from the party.

Buchman had accepted the invitation of Dr. Heinrich Kost, head of the German Coal Board, to send a team to the Ruhr. For two years, Buchman sustained over 100 MRA workers in the area. Before their arrival, 72% of the workers' council seats were held by communists. By 1950, the percentage had shrunk to 25%. According to Hubert Stein, an executive member of the German Miners Union, this decline was "to a great extent due to Moral Re-Armament". In 1950, Radio Berlin and other stations broadcast a speech by Buchman: "Marxists are finding a new thinking in a day of crisis. The class struggle is being superseded. Management and labour are beginning to live the positive alternative to the class war. ... Can Marxists pave the way for a greater ideology? Why not? They have always been open to new things. ... Why should they not be the ones to live for this superior thinking?"

From then, Radio Moscow periodically attacked both Buchman and Moral Re-Armament. In 1952, Georgi Arbatov described MRA as "a universal ideology" which "supplants the inevitable class war" with "the permanent struggle between good and evil".

== Personal life ==
Buchman never married. Despite a stroke in 1942 and failing health that eventually led to blindness and immobility, he remained as active as possible until his death on August 6, 1961. He was interred in Allentown, Pennsylvania.

== Controversy ==
Buchman was a controversial figure throughout much of his adult life, and critics dubbed his movement "Buchmanism" from the 1920s. In the UK, his critics included the Labour MP Tom Driberg, who wrote an influential critique, The Mystery of Moral Re-Armament.

=== Religious ===
Another prominent British critic was the Bishop of Durham, Hensley Henson, who wrote of disgust at "the unscrupulous and even unwarrantable use made of well-known names, at the grotesque exaggeration of the advertisements, at the unseemly luxury and extravagance of the travelling teams, at the artificiality of the 'sharing', at the mystery of the finance, at the oracular despotism of 'Frank'. ... I refrain from dwelling on the darkest shadow on the movement—I mean the trail of moral and intellectual wrecks which its progress leaves behind." On the other hand, Buchman was supported by figures such as Cosmo Lang, the Archbishop of Canterbury, and Gabriel Marcel. Malcolm Muggeridge professed that for a long time he could not understand why Buchman caused such "extraordinary hostility", and later came to the conclusion that "in a libertine society any attack on libertinism is an anathema."

Buchman provoked similarly polarised reactions from clergy and theologians internationally. German theologian Dietrich Bonhoeffer accused Buchman of naïveté over his attempts to convert Hitler:

- "The Oxford Group has been naïve enough to try to convert Hitler - a ridiculous failure to understand what is going on - it is we who are to be converted, not Hitler."

In the U.S., Buchman was strongly opposed by Reinhold Niebuhr, who suggested Buchman’s naïveté regarding the Nazis represented a broader dangerous attitude to worldly power:

- "In other words, a Nazi social philosophy has been a covert presumption of the whole Oxford group enterprise from the very beginning. We may be grateful to the leader for revealing so clearly what has been slightly hidden. Now we can see how unbelievably naïve this movement is in its efforts to save the world. If it would content itself with preaching repentance to drunkards and adulterers one might be willing to respect it as a religious revival method which knows how to confront the sinner with God. But when it runs to Geneva, the seat of the League of Nations, or to Prince Starhemberg or Hitler, or to any seat of power, always with the idea that it is on the verge of saving the world by bringing the people who control the world under God-control, it is difficult to restrain the contempt which one feels for this dangerous childishness."

The Swiss theologian Emil Brunner tried to dissuade Buchman from his efforts to convert the Nazi leadership on the basis that he was endangering the reputation of himself and his work. Buchman replied to Brunner: "Your danger is that you are still the Professor thundering from the pulpit and want the theologically perfect. But the German Church crisis will never be solved this way. Just think of your sentence, 'Unfortunately this hopeless fellow Hossenfelder has damaged the reputation of the Groups.' It sounds to me like associating with 'publicans and sinners.' Just keep your sense of humor and read the New Testament. The Groups in that sense have no reputation, and for myself, I have nothing to lose."

On other matters, Brunner had frequently acknowledged his debt to Buchman. Several other theologians spoke highly of Buchman. Canon B.H. Streeter, Provost of The Queen's College, Oxford and a highly respected New Testament scholar of the 1920s and 1930s, publicly associated himself with the Oxford School from 1934 until his death in a plane crash in 1937. Klaus Bockmuehl, Professor of Theology and Ethics, Regent College, Vancouver and author of Listening to the God Who Speaks, wrote: "The genius of Moral Re-Armament is to bring the central spiritual substance of Christianity (which it often demonstrates in a fresher and more powerful way than do the Churches) in a secular and accessible form. Hence the emphasis on absolute moral standards. But the direction of the Holy Spirit is just as essential. ... The genius is in the balance of the two."

Cardinal Franz König said that Buchman was "a turning point in the history of the modern world through his ideas", and Patriarch Athenagoras of Constantinople, called Buchman "a modern St. Paul".

=== Buchman, Hitler, and fascism ===
As noted above, Dietrich Bonhoeffer and other theologians criticised Buchman for naïveté in seeking to convert Hitler, with Reinhold Niebuhr describing this as indicative of a “dangerous childishness” in seeking to save the world by converting people holding power.

Other critics, including George Orwell, directly accused Buchman of being fascist.

One quote in particular always dogged Buchman, from an interview he gave to the New York World-Telegram, which it published on August 25, 1936:

- "I thank heaven for a man like Adolf Hitler, who built a front line of defense against the anti-Christ of Communism."

And along the same lines:

- "My barber in London told me Hitler saved Europe from Communism. That's how he felt. Of course, I don't condone everything the Nazis do. Anti-Semitism? Bad, naturally. I suppose Hitler sees a Karl Marx in every Jew."
- "Human problems aren't economic. They're moral and they can't be solved by immoral measures. They could be solved within a God-controlled democracy, or perhaps I should say a theocracy, and they could be solved through a God-controlled Fascist dictatorship."

Garrett Stearly, who was present when Buchman spoke to the journalist, was amazed at the story which was "so out of key with the interview. ... He said that Germany needed a new Christian spirit, yet one had to face the fact that Hitler had been a bulwark against Communism there - and you could at least thank heaven for that. It was a throw-away line. No eulogy of Hitler at all." Buchman himself refused to be drawn into further public comment, which he believed could only lead to more public controversy and endanger his friends in the Oxford Group inside Germany who were already, as stated above, facing difficulties.

Gestapo documents released after the war showed that the Nazis believed that Buchman was working for British intelligence, and referred to the Oxford Group as "a new and dangerous opponent of National Socialism". "The Group as a whole", says the 126-page report Die Oxfordgruppenbewegung, "constitutes an attack on the nationalism of the State and demands the utmost watchfulness on the part of the State. It preaches revolution against the National State, and has quite evidently become its Christian opponent."

During World War II, there was also controversy over British members of Moral Re-Armament working in the U.S. when they would have been eligible for call-up in the UK.

=== Sexual ===
Critics charged that the "total honesty" encouraged at Oxford Group house parties really concentrated morbidly on sexual issues, particularly masturbation. In response to these criticisms, Buchman said, "We do unhesitatingly meet sex problems in the same proportion as they are met and spoken of in that authoritative record, the New Testament... No one can read the New Testament without facing it, but never at the expense of what they consider more flagrant sins, such as dishonesty and selfishness." This was supported by J.W.C. Wand, then dean of Oriel College and later Bishop of London who wrote, in the August 1930 issue of Theology: "One hears more of selfishness, pride, ill-will than anything else, and the charge that 'Buchmanism' is unduly concerned with sexual matters had better be dismissed as the merest nonsense."

=== Princeton ===
An early criticism centered on the accusation that Buchman had been expelled from Princeton University in the 1920s. In fact, Buchman had never held any position there, though following his success at Hartford Seminary a group of Buchman's proteges were running the Philadelphian Society (the main Christian organization at the university) along Buchman's principles. After a number of complaints, President Hibben set up a high level committee to investigate, saying to the press, "There is no place for Buchmanism in Princeton." After some months, the report appeared, saying that it had looked into the charges that members of the Society had practiced an aggressive and offensive form of evangelism; that individual privacy had been invaded; that confessions of guilt had been required as a condition of Christian life; that meetings had been held where mutual confession of intimate sins had been encouraged; and that emphasis had been placed on confessions of sexual immorality. The authors concluded, "We have endeavored in every way to secure any evidence which would tend to substantiate or justify these charges ... no evidence has been produced before us which substantiates or justifies them ... Under these circumstances we feel that in justice we should state that in our opinion the charges are the result either of misapprehension or criticism without foundation." In fact, the report went farther, praising the "signal success" of the society's work. Despite this, Hibben demanded that the leadership of the Philadelphia Society sever their connections with Buchman or lose their positions. Rather than complying, they resigned.

== Awards ==
- Honorary degree in Doctor of Laws from Oglethorpe University (1939)
- Légion d'honneur, awarded on June 4, 1950
- Order of Merit of the Federal Republic of Germany, 1952

== Literary allusions ==
- In 1934, a group of Oxford Buchmanists is prominent in the action of one of Rose Macaulay's earlier novels, Going Abroad, published by William Collins, Sons.
- In 1945, Ngaio Marsh's mystery novel Died in the Wool, set in New Zealand during World War II, Fabian Losse, a medically discharged British soldier recuperating with family in New Zealand refers to Buchmanism to mean self-confession.
- In 1961, on the first page of The Prime of Miss Jean Brodie, by Muriel Spark, Miss Brodie's girls are described as having "heard of the Buchmanites and Mussolini", much to the consternation of the headmistress.
