= The Big Book (Alcoholics Anonymous) =

Bestselling book on how to recover from addiction

Alcoholics Anonymous: The Story of How More Than One Hundred Men and Women Have Recovered from Alcoholism
- 2nd edition cover, 1955
- Author: Bill W.
- Language: English
- Subject: Alcoholism, Alcoholics Anonymous
- Publisher: Alcoholics Anonymous World Services
- Publication date: April 10, 1939 (1st ed.); 1955 (2nd ed.); 1976 (3rd ed.); 2001 (4th ed.)
- Publication place: United States
- Media type: Print (hardback, paperback and online)
- ISBN: 1-893007-16-2
- OCLC: 408888189

Alcoholics Anonymous: The Story of How More Than One Hundred Men and Women Have Recovered from Alcoholism (nicknamed "The Big Book" because of the thickness of the paper used in the first edition) is a 1939 basic text describing how to seek recovery from alcoholism. The Big Book was written by William G. Bill W." Wilson, one of the founders of Alcoholics Anonymous (AA or A.A.), with the help of various editors. The composition process was not collaborative other than editing. Bill W. wrote all the book's chapters except "To Employers", which was authored by Bill W.'s right-hand man, Hank Parkhurst. Parkhurst influenced the more liberal notions of "God as we understand him" and "your own conception of God." Bill W.'s group in New York and Robert Holbrook Smith (a.k.a. "Dr. Bob"), the other AA founder, in Akron, Ohio, exchanged drafts of sections. Dr. Bob made no major changes. It is the predecessor of the well-known "twelve-step method" widely used to treat various addiction conditions and behaviors, including alcoholism, narcotic addiction, and marijuana addiction, as well as overeating, sex addiction, and gambling addiction, with strong spiritual and pro-social emphases. It is one of the best-selling books of all time, having sold 30 million copies as of August 2009. In 2011, Time magazine placed the book on its list of the 100 best and most influential books written in English since 1923, the year in which the magazine was first published. In 2012, the Library of Congress designated it as one of 88 "Books that Shaped America."

== History ==
Bill W. had been a successful Wall Street businessman, but his career was in shambles because of his chronic alcoholism. In 1934 he was invited by his friend and drinking buddy Ebby Thacher to join the Oxford Group, a spiritual movement based on the “Four Absolutes” of honesty, purity, unselfishness, and love. Bill W met Dr. Bob in May 1935, and the men shared their stories with one another. The two began to work on how to best approach alcoholics and began trying to help men recover from alcoholism. The idea for the book developed when Bill W. and Dr. Bob realized their system had helped over 40 men stay sober for more than 2 years. The book was meant to carry their message far and wide. Wilson started writing the book in 1938 with the financial support of Charles B. Towns (1862–1947), an expert on alcoholism and drug addiction who was a supporter and creditor of Alcoholics Anonymous and lent Wilson $2500 (equivalent to $57,181 in 2025).

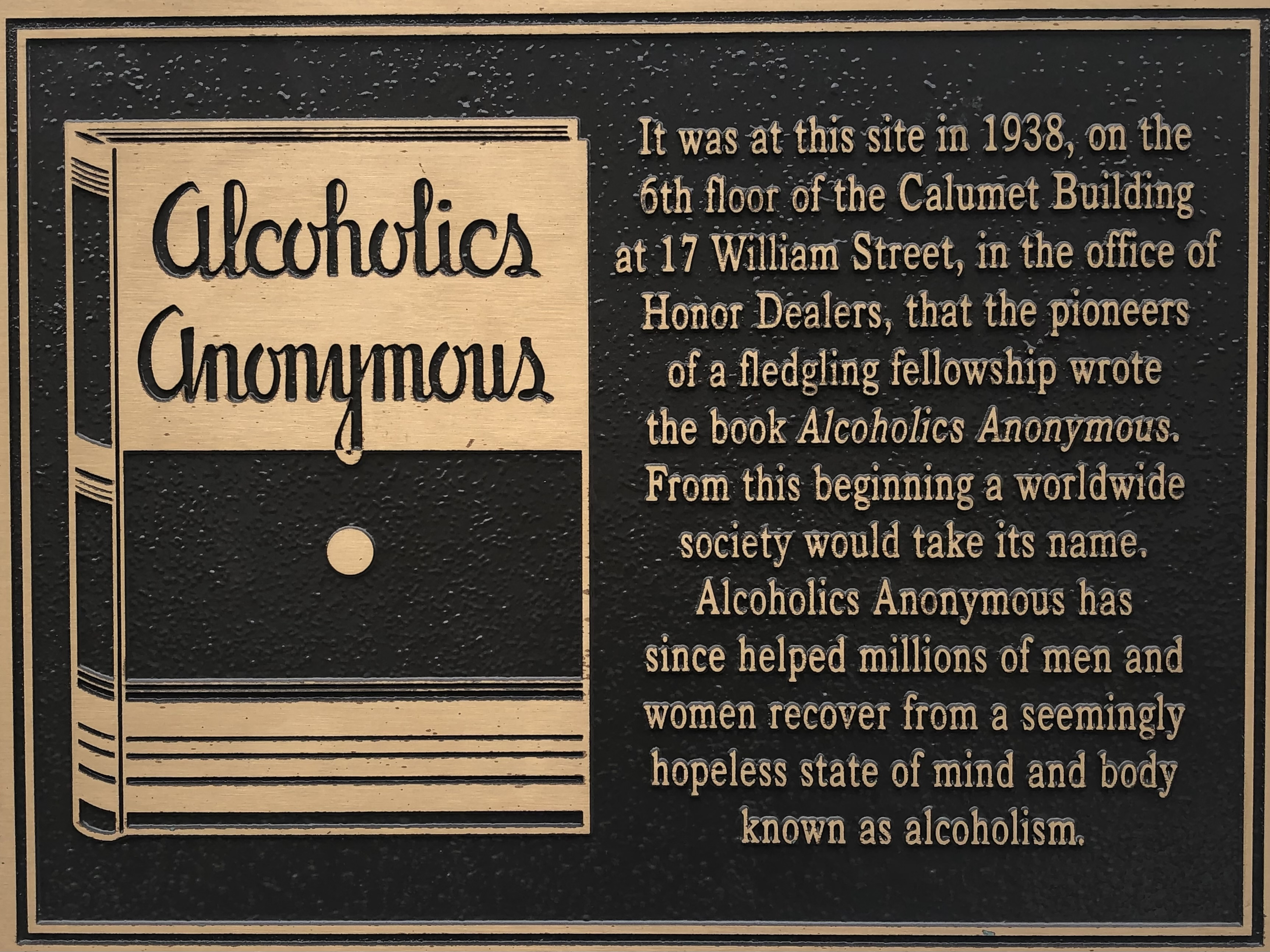
Plaque at site of Calumet Building

Much of the book was written in 1938 at the Calumet Building in Newark, New Jersey (the site of the first headquarters of Alcoholics Anonymous), using the secretarial services provided by Ruth Hock.

The Big Book was originally published in 1939, and serves as the basic text of AA. It has been reprinted and revised many times, and translated into dozens of languages. The second edition (1955) consisted of 1,150,000 copies. Alcoholics Anonymous World Services publishes the book, and it is available through AA offices and meetings, as well as through booksellers. The 4th edition (2001) is also available online for free. Marty Mann (1904–1980) wrote the chapter "Women Suffer Too" in the second through fourth editions of the Big Book.

U.S. President Richard Nixon received the millionth copy of the book. The 25-millionth copy of the Big Book was presented to Jill Brown, the warden of San Quentin State Prison, at the International Convention of Alcoholics Anonymous in Toronto, Ontario to commemorate the first prison meeting of Alcoholics Anonymous taking place at San Quentin in 1941. The 30-millionth copy of the book was presented to the American Medical Association in 2010, which declared alcoholism an illness in 1956.

== Synopsis ==
The book consists of over 400 pages. Bill W.'s Story and Dr. Bob's Nightmare and the personal experiences of some alcoholics are detailed as well as the series of solutions which evolved to become the twelve-step program. How to use the twelve steps is explained using examples and anecdotes. Some chapters target a specific audience. One chapter is devoted to agnostics, and another is named "To Wives" (most of the first AA members were men), and still another is for employers. The second part of the book (whose content varies from edition to edition) is a collection of personal stories, in which alcoholics tell their stories of addiction and recovery.

Frequently mentioned sections are:

- the "Twelve Steps", at the beginning of Chapter 5, "How It Works"
- the "Twelve Traditions", in the Appendix
- the "Ninth Step Promises", in Chapter 6, "Into Action" preceding the discussion of the 10th Step.

The main goal of the book is to make it possible for the reader to find a power greater than himself to solve his problem. The writers indicate that an alcoholic "of our type" can under no circumstances become a moderate drinker: only abstinence and the understanding of the community of alcoholics can lead to recovery. By way of anecdotal evidence, the example is provided of a man who, after 25 years sobriety, began to drink moderately and within two months landed in hospital. The reasoning is that once an alcoholic, always an alcoholic.

The book contends that it is impossible for an alcoholic to quit drinking by oneself. A new attitude or set of values also would not help. Whosoever is an alcoholic must admit that they cannot help themselves alone. Only a "higher power" and the community can help. An example of a man named Fred is given, who had no control over his drinking, but finally leads an "infinitely more satisfying life" than before thanks to the previously unexplained principles of AA. In the introduction to the Big Book, William Duncan Silkworth, M.D., a specialist in the treatment of alcoholism, endorses the AA program after treating Bill W., the founder of AA, and other apparently hopeless alcoholics who then regained their health by joining the AA fellowship. "For most cases," Silkworth claimed, "there is no other solution" than a spiritual solution. Today "many doctors and psychiatrists" confirm the effects of AA.

== Reception ==
=== First edition ===
At the time of the publication of the first edition, The Big Book was typically well received by most critics, referred to by one reviewer as "the greatest redemptive force of the 20th century." A reviewer for the New York Times stated that the thesis of the book had more of a sound base psychologically than any other book on the subject and that the book is unlike any other book ever published. Other critics called the book extraordinary and stated that it deserved the attention of anyone worried about the problem of alcoholism. It was noted by the American Association of Psychiatric Social Workers that contact with the members of an A.A. group increases one's respect for their work. "To the layman, the book is very clear. To the professional person it is at first a bit misleading in that the spiritual aspect gives the impression that this is another revival movement" and that "it is more impressive to the professional person to watch the technique in action than to read the book." However, not all reviewers, especially those in the medical field, found merit in the book. The review that appeared in the October 1939 volume of the Journal of the American Medical Association called the book "a curious combination of organizing propaganda and religious exhortation…in no sense a scientific book." Similarly, the Journal of Nervous and Mental Disease said The Big Book was "big in words…a rambling sort of camp meeting…Of the inner meaning of alcoholism there is hardly a word. It is all on the surface material." This review went on to "degrade" the alcoholic: "Inasmuch as the alcoholic, speaking generally, lives a wish-fulfilling infantile regression to the omnipotent delusional state, perhaps he is best handled for the time being at least by regressive mass psychological methods, in which, as is realized, religious fervors belong, hence the religious trend of the book." The views about the book and about alcoholism espoused in these two journals was typical of how alcoholics and other addicts were viewed by many in the psychiatric field during the middle of the 20th century.

=== Later editions ===
When the second version of The Big Book was released in 1955, reviewers once again gave their opinions, with reception still mostly positive. One reviewer stated that the pages of the book were American legend and would "remain there, through the full history of man's pursuit of maturity." This was the case with the release of the third edition in 1976 as well. The journal Employee Assistance Quarterly in 1985 asked three professionals in the field of addictive behaviors to review the book, with each reviewer asked to answer the following questions:

1. In light of current professional views of alcoholism, is the Big Book still appropriate in understanding the nature of the alcoholism and/or other addictive behaviours?
2. Does the Big Book provide an adequate explanation of alcoholism recovery?
3. Is the therapeutic approach to alcoholism as depicted in this text consistent with contemporary efforts to treating addictive behaviours like alcoholism?
4. Does this text adequately reflect how Alcoholics Anonymous and other self-help groups currently practice?
5. In your opinion, does the Big Book represent an effective therapeutic model for alcoholism and/or other addictive behaviours?

Albert Ellis called the book "complex and profound" and admitted it probably helped millions of people with addictions. Ellis found seven of the twelve steps to be useful to the recovering alcoholic: steps 1, 4, 5, 8, 9, 10, and 12, noting "these urge them to admit their addictive and self-destructive ways, make amends to those they have harmed, acquire a philosophic awakening, and carry their message to other alcoholics." However, Ellis believed that steps, 2, 3, 6, 7, and 11, those urging alcoholics to rely upon a Higher Power, to be of dubious value. Some of his reasons for distrusting these steps included the contention that millions had overcome alcohol while remaining agnostic or atheist and that the necessity to accept belief in a Higher Power likely pushed more people away from the program than it drew in. Ellis' analysis of the book was that it has some excellent views but that "A.A. is too good an organization to bow to the will of anyone – including any hypothetical Higher Power."

G. Alan Marlatt also questioned the necessity of a need for a Higher Power but concluded that he was "impressed with the amazing success of A.A. over the past 50 years of its existence. If alcoholism is really a disease of the spirit (for which alcohol is no real solution), then it makes sense that the religious fellowship of A.A. provides fulfillment of the alcoholic's underlying craving for union with a Higher Power. Especially if it keeps its members sober, which A.A. often does."

Abraham Twerski was the most positive of the three experts, claiming that "the continuing relevance of the Big Book to today's alcoholic is precisely due to the fact that it does not seek to treat nor teach by its contents. Rather, it is a description of a program that is effective, and provides testimonials of people whom the program has helped." Twerski also praised the ability of the 12-step program to treat other addictions as well "because the 12-steps are a protocol for personality, for growth, and for self-realization, a process of value to even the non-alcoholic or non-addicted individual." Twerski's praise is most easily summed up with his conclusion that "the Big Book and A.A. remain as effective today as the day they came into being, and are likely to remain unfettered by the continuing passage of time."

=== Plain Language Big Book ===
On November 1, 2025, Alcoholics Anonymous published Plain Language Big Book: A Tool for Reading Alcoholics Anonymous in paperback and ebook formats. According to the press release, this version of the book stands as "a new resource designed to make the Twelve Step recovery program more accessible to individuals who may encounter difficulties comprehending the language of the original text Alcoholics Anonymous, which was first published in 1939." The new text, written in plain language for greater accessibility, was reviewed and recommended for publishing by the General Service Conference in April 2024.

== Legacy ==
Before the publication of The Big Book, alcoholism in America was viewed largely as it had been in the 19th century. The temperance movements of the 19th century and the recent experiment with Prohibition focused on the individual, promoted by "degenerationism, the theory that biological factors, toxic environmental influences or moral vices may trigger a cascade of social, moral and medical problems". This theory was a holdover from the pre-Darwinian belief that offspring inherited acquired character traits from their parents. The increase in scientific knowledge in the early 20th century led to questions about this view of alcoholics, but the view still dominated for the first 30 years of the century. A decisive turn toward seeing alcoholism as a disease was the publication of The Big Book and the founding of A.A.

== See also ==
- History of Alcoholics Anonymous
- The Little Red Book
- Twelve Steps and Twelve Traditions
