= History of Alcoholics Anonymous =

AA Big Book, 2nd edition

Alcoholics Anonymous (AA) is a global fellowship founded in 1935 by Bill Wilson (known as Bill W.) and Robert Smith (known as Dr. Bob), and has since grown to be worldwide.

== Alcoholism in the 1700s and 1800s ==
Nearly two centuries before the advent of Alcoholics Anonymous, John Wesley established Methodist penitent bands, which were organized on Saturday nights, the evening on which members of these small groups were most tempted to frequent alehouses. The hymns and teaching provided during the penitent band meetings addressed the issues that members faced, often alcoholism. As a result, penitent bands have often been compared to Alcoholics Anonymous in scholarly discourse.

== Alcoholism in the 1930s ==
In post-Prohibition 1930s America, it was common to perceive alcoholism as a moral failing, and the medical profession standards of the time treated it as a condition that was likely incurable and lethal. Those without financial resources found help through state hospitals, the Salvation Army, or other charitable societies and religious groups. Those who could afford psychiatrists or hospitals were subjected to a treatment with barbiturate and belladonna known as "purge and puke" or were left in long-term asylum treatment.

Despite being aware of medical issues associated with alcoholism, doctors and scientists dismissed them. Skepticism of earlier 20th century claims about the dangers of alcohol arose, minimizing the reality of alcohol-related health problems. Moreover, alcohol-related diseases were not published during this time. Post-prohibition scientists allegedly were eager to separate themselves from the period of temperance. The legislature of Virginia burned scientific journals that condoned moderate drinking to distance themselves from the "wet-dry debate".

== The Oxford Group ==
The Oxford Group was a Christian fellowship founded by American Christian missionary Frank Buchman. Buchman was a minister, originally Lutheran, then Evangelical, who had a conversion experience in 1908 in a chapel in Keswick, England, the revival center of the Higher Life movement. As a result of that experience, he founded a movement named A First Century Christian Fellowship in 1921. This came to be known as the Oxford Group by 1928.

Buchman summarized the Oxford Group philosophy in a few sentences: "All people are sinners"; "All sinners can be changed"; "Confession is a prerequisite to change"; "The changed person can access God directly"; "Miracles are again possible"; and "The changed person must change others."

The practices they utilized were called the five C's:

- Confidence
- Confession
- Conviction
- Conversion
- Continuance

Their standard of morality was the Four Absolutes – a summary of the teachings of the Sermon on the Mount:

- Absolute-Honesty
- Absolute-Purity
- Absolute-Unselfishness
- Absolute-Love

In his search for relief from his alcoholism, Bill Wilson, one of the two co-founders of AA, joined The Oxford Group and learned its teachings. While Wilson later broke from The Oxford Group, he based the structure of Alcoholics Anonymous and many of the ideas that formed the foundation of AA's suggested Twelve-Step Program on the teachings of the Oxford Group. Later in life, Bill Wilson gave credit to the Oxford Group for saving his life.

An Oxford Group understanding of the human condition is evident in Wilson's formulation of the dilemma of the alcoholic; Oxford Group program of recovery and influences of Oxford Group evangelism still can be detected in key practices of Alcoholics Anonymous. The Oxford Group writers sometimes treated sin as a disease. They believed that sin was "anything that stood between the individual and God". Sin frustrated "God's plan" for oneself, and selfishness and self-centeredness were considered the key problems. Therefore, if one could "surrender one's ego to God", sin would go with it. In early AA, Wilson spoke of sin and the need for a complete surrender to God. The Oxford Group also prided itself on being able to help troubled persons at any time. AA gained an early warrant from the Oxford Group for the concept that disease could be spiritual, but it broadened the diagnosis to include the physical and psychological.

In 1955, Wilson wrote: "The early AA got its ideas of self-examination, acknowledgment of character defects, restitution for harm done, and working with others straight from the Oxford Group and directly from Sam Shoemaker, their former leader in America, and from nowhere else." According to Mercadante, however, the AA concept of powerlessness over alcohol departs significantly from Oxford Group belief. In AA, the bondage of an addictive disease cannot be cured, and the Oxford Group stressed the possibility of complete victory over sin.

=== How Alcoholics Connected with the Oxford Group ===
Rowland Hazard

In 1926, Rowland Hazard, an American business executive, went to Zurich, Switzerland, to seek treatment for alcoholism with psychiatrist Carl Jung. When Hazard ended treatment with Jung after about a year, and came back to the US, he soon resumed drinking, and returned to Jung in Zurich for further treatment. Jung told Hazard that his case was nearly hopeless (as with other alcoholics) and that his only hope might be a "spiritual conversion" with a "religious group".

Back in America, Hazard went to the Oxford Group, whose teachings were eventually the source of such AA concepts as "meetings" and "sharing" (public confession), making "restitution", "rigorous honesty" and "surrendering one's will and life to God's care". Hazard underwent a spiritual conversion" with the help of the Group and began to experience the liberation from drink he was seeking. He became converted to a lifetime of sobriety while on a train ride from New York to Detroit after reading For Sinners Only by Oxford Group member AJ Russell.

Ebby Thacher

Members of the group introduced Hazard to Ebby Thacher. Hazard brought Thacher to the Calvary Rescue Mission, led by Oxford Group leader Sam Shoemaker. Over the years, the mission had helped over 200,000 needy people. Thacher also attained periodic sobriety in later years and died sober.

Bill Wilson

In keeping with the Oxford Group teaching that a new convert must win other converts to preserve his own conversion experience, Thacher contacted his old friend Bill Wilson, whom he knew had a drinking problem.

== 1934 Bill Wilson sober ==
Bill Wilson was an alcoholic who had ruined a promising career on Wall Street by his drinking. He had also failed to graduate from law school because he was too drunk to pick up his diploma. His drinking damaged his marriage, and he was hospitalized for alcoholism at Towns Hospital in New York four times in 1933–1934 under the care of William Silkworth.

On Wilson's first stay at Towns Hospital, Silkworth explained to him his theory that alcoholism is an illness rather than a moral failure or failure of willpower. Silkworth believed that alcoholics were suffering from a mental obsession, combined with an allergy that made compulsive drinking inevitable, and to break the cycle one had to completely abstain from alcohol use. Wilson was elated to find that he suffered from an illness, and he managed to stay off alcohol for a month before he resumed drinking.

When Ebby Thacher visited Wilson at his New York apartment and told him "he had got religion," Wilson's heart sank. Until then, Wilson had struggled with the existence of God, but of his meeting with Thacher he wrote: "My friend suggested what then seemed a novel idea. He said, 'Why don't you choose your own conception of God?' That statement hit me hard. It melted the icy intellectual mountain in whose shadow I had lived and shivered many years. I stood in the sunlight at last." When Thacher left, Wilson continued to drink. Thacher returned a few days later bringing with him Shep Cornell, another Oxford Group member who was aggressive in his tactics of promoting the Oxford Group Program, but despite their efforts Wilson continued to drink.

The next morning Wilson arrived at Calvary Rescue Mission in a drunken state looking for Thacher. Once there, he attended his first Oxford Group meeting, where he answered the call to come to the altar and, along with other penitents, "gave his life to Christ". Wilson excitedly told his wife Lois about his spiritual progress, yet the next day he drank again and a few days later readmitted himself to Towns Hospital for the fourth and last time.

At Towns Hospital under Silkworth's care, Wilson was administered a drug cure concocted by Charles B. Towns. Known as the Belladonna Cure, it contained belladonna (Atropa belladonna) and henbane (Hyoscyamus niger). These plants contain deliriants, such as atropine and scopolamine, that cause hallucinations.

It was while undergoing this treatment that Wilson experienced his "Hot Flash" spiritual conversion. While lying in bed depressed and despairing, Wilson cried out: "I'll do anything! Anything at all! If there be a God, let Him show Himself!" He then had the sensation of a bright light, a feeling of ecstasy, and a new serenity. Wilson described his experience to Silkworth, who told him not to discount it.

Thacher visited Wilson at Towns Hospital and introduced him to the basic tenets of the Oxford Group and to the book Varieties of Religious Experience (1902) by American psychologist and philosopher William James. Upon reading the book, Wilson was later to state that the phrase "deflation at depth" leapt out at him from the page of William James's book; however, this phrase does not appear in the book. It was James's theory that spiritual transformations come from calamities, and their source lies in pain and hopelessness, and surrender. James's belief concerning alcoholism was that "the cure for dipsomania was religiomania".

Upon his release from the hospital on December 18, 1934, Wilson moved from the Calvary Rescue Mission to the Oxford Group meeting at Calvary House. There Wilson socialized after the meetings with other ex-drinking Oxford Group members and became interested in learning how to help other alcoholics achieve sobriety. It was during this time that Wilson went on a crusade to save alcoholics. Sources for his prospects were the Calvary Rescue Mission and Towns Hospital. Though not a single one of the alcoholics Wilson tried to help stayed sober, Wilson himself stayed sober.

== 1935 Dr. Bob sober ==
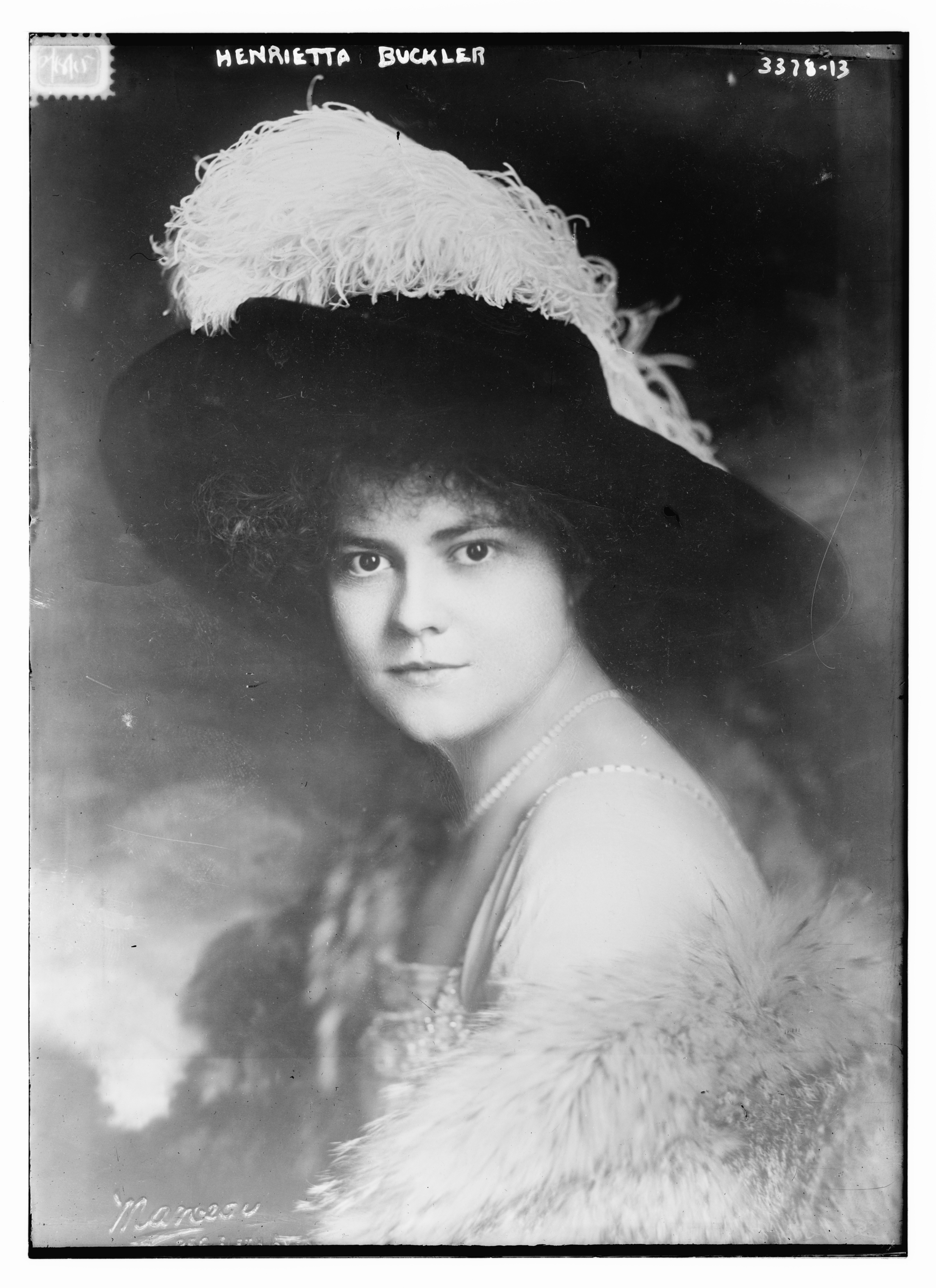
Henrietta Buckler Seiberling

Silkworth believed Wilson was making a mistake by telling new converts of his "Hot Flash" conversion and thus trying to apply the Oxford Group's principles. He advised Wilson of the need to "deflate" the alcoholic. He told Wilson to give them his medical understanding, and give it to them hard: tell them of the obsession that condemns them to drink and the physical sensitivity that condemns them to go mad and of the compulsion to drink that might kill them. He believed that if this message were told to them by another alcoholic, it would break down their ego. Only then could the alcoholic use the other "medicine" Wilson had to give – the ethical principles he had picked up from the Oxford Groups.

Subsequently, during a business trip to Akron, Ohio, Wilson was tempted to drink and realized he must talk to another alcoholic to stay sober. He phoned local ministers to ask if they knew any alcoholics. Norman Sheppard directed him to Oxford Group member Henrietta Seiberling, whose group had been trying to help a desperate alcoholic named Dr Bob Smith.

While he was a student at Dartmouth College, Smith started drinking heavily and later almost failed to graduate from medical school because of it. He opened a medical practice and married, but his drinking put his business and family life in jeopardy. For 17 years, Smith's daily routine was to stay sober until the afternoon, get drunk, sleep, then take sedatives to calm his morning jitters. Seiberling convinced Smith to talk with Wilson, but Smith insisted the meeting be limited to 15 minutes. Smith was so impressed with Wilson's knowledge of alcoholism and ability to share from his own experience, however, that their discussion lasted six hours.

Wilson moved into Bob and Anne Smith's family home. There both men made plans to take their message of recovery on the road. During this period, however, Smith returned to drinking while attending a medical convention. During his stay at the Smith home, Wilson joined Smith and his wife in the Oxford Group's practice of "morning guidance" sessions with meditations and Bible readings. The Bible's Book of James became an important inspiration for Smith and the alcoholics of the Akron group. Wilson spent a month working with Smith, and Smith became the first alcoholic Wilson brought to sobriety. Smith's last drink was on June 10, 1935 (a beer to steady his hand for surgery), and this is considered by AA members to be the founding date of AA.

=== A new program ===
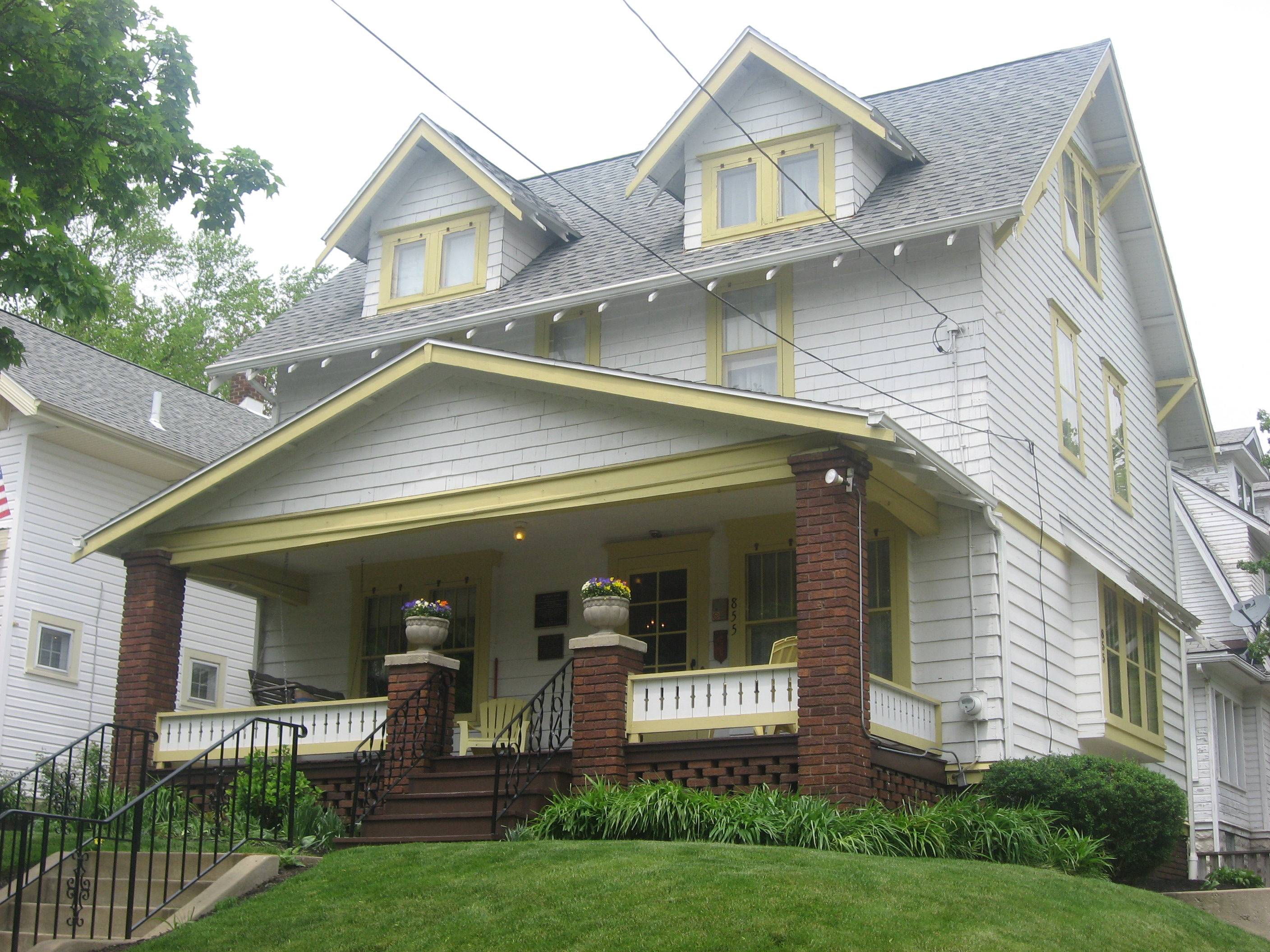
Robert Smith's House in Akron

Wilson and Smith sought to develop a simple program to help even the worst alcoholics, along with a more successful approach that empathized with alcoholics yet convinced them of their hopelessness and powerlessness. They believed active alcoholics were in a state of insanity rather than a state of sin, an idea they developed independently of the Oxford Group.

To produce a spiritual conversion necessary for sobriety and "restoration to sanity", alcoholics needed to realize that they couldn't conquer alcoholism by themselves – that "surrendering to a higher power" and "working" with other alcoholics were required. Sober alcoholics could show drinking alcoholics that it was possible to enjoy life without alcohol, thus inspiring a spiritual conversion that would help ensure sobriety.

The tactics employed by Smith and Wilson to bring about the conversion was first to determine if an individual had a drinking problem. To do this, they would first approach the man's wife, and later they would approach the individual directly by going to his home or by inviting him to the Smiths' home. The objective was to get the man to "surrender", and the surrender involved a confession of "powerlessness" and a prayer that said the man believed in a "higher power" and that he could be "restored to sanity". This process would sometimes take place in the kitchen, or at other times it was at the man's bed with Wilson kneeling on one side of the bed and Smith on the other side. This way the man would be led to admit his "defeat". Wilson and Smith believed that until a man had "surrendered", he couldn't attend the Oxford Group meetings. No one was allowed to attend a meeting without being "sponsored". Thus a new prospect underwent many visits around the clock with members of the Akron team and undertook many prayer sessions, as well as listening to Smith cite the medical facts about alcoholism. A new prospect was also put on a special diet of sauerkraut, tomatoes and Karo syrup to reduce his alcoholic cravings. The Smith family home in Akron became a center for alcoholics.

Two realizations came from Wilson and Smith's work in Akron. The first was that, to remain sober, an alcoholic needed another alcoholic to work with. The second was the concept of the "24 hours" – that if the alcoholic could resist the urge to drink by postponing it for one day, one hour, or even one minute, he could remain sober.

=== An Akron group and a New York group ===
After he and Smith worked with AA members three and four, Bill Dotson and Ernie G., an initial Akron group was established. Wilson returned to New York and began hosting meetings in his home in the fall of 1935.

Wilson allowed alcoholics to live in his home for long periods without paying rent and board. This practice of providing a halfway house was started by Bob Smith and his wife Anne. Wilson's wife, Lois, not only worked at a department store and supported Wilson and his unpaying guests, but she also did all the cooking and cleaning. She also tried to help many of the alcoholics that came to live with them. She was attacked by one man with a kitchen knife after she refused his advances, and another man committed suicide by gassing himself on their premises. Later they found that he had stolen and sold off their best clothes. Wilson stopped the practice in 1936 when he saw that it did little to help alcoholics recover. The Wilsons did not become disillusioned with the Oxford Group until later; they attended the Oxford Group meetings at the Calvary Church on a regular basis and went to a number of the Oxford Group "house parties" up until 1937.

=== Separating from the Oxford Group ===
There were two programs operating at this time, one in Akron and the other in New York. The Akron Oxford Group and the New York Oxford Group had two very different attitudes toward the alcoholics in their midst. The Akron Oxford members welcomed alcoholics into their group and did not use them to attract new members, nor did they urge new members to quit smoking as everyone was in New-York's Group; and Akron's alcoholics did not meet separately from the Oxford Group.

The Wilsons' practice of hosting meetings solely for alcoholics, separate from the general Oxford Group meetings, generated criticism within the New York Oxford Group. Oxford Group members believed the Wilsons' sole focus on alcoholics caused them to ignore what else they could be doing for the Oxford Group. While Sam Shoemaker was on vacation, members of the Oxford Group declared the Wilsons not "Maximum", and members were advised not to attend the Wilsons' meetings. In 1937, the Wilsons broke with the Oxford Group. According to the Oxford Group, Wilson quit; according to Lois Wilson, they "were kicked out." Wilson later wrote that he found the Oxford Group aggressive in their evangelism. He objected to the group's publicity-seeking and intolerance of nonbelievers, and those alcoholics who were practicing Catholics found their views to be in conflict with the Oxford Group teachings. The alcoholics within the Akron group did not break away from the Oxford Group there until 1939. Their break was not from a need to be free of the Oxford Group; it was an action taken to show solidarity with their brethren in New York.

At the end of 1937, after the New York separation from the Oxford Group, Wilson returned to Akron, where he and Smith calculated their early success rate to be about five percent. Over 40 alcoholics in Akron and New York had remained sober since they began their work. Wilson then made plans to finance and implement his program on a mass scale, which included publishing a book, employing paid missionaries, and opening alcoholic treatment centers. The 18 alcoholic members of the Akron group saw little need for paid employees, missionaries, hospitals or literature other than the Oxford Group's. Some of what Wilson proposed violated the spiritual principles they were practicing in the Oxford Group. By a one-vote margin, they agreed to Wilson's writing a book, but they refused any financial support of his venture.

== 1939 The Big Book ==
The title of the book Wilson wrote is Alcoholics Anonymous: The Story Of How More Than One Hundred Men Have Recovered From Alcoholism but it is referred to by AA members as "the Big Book". Its main objective is to help the alcoholic find a power greater than himself" that will solve his problem, the "problem" being an inability to stay sober on his or her own.

=== Rockefeller ===
One of the main reasons the book was written was to provide an inexpensive way to get the AA program of recovery to suffering alcoholics.

In the early days of AA, after the new program ideas were agreed to by Bill Wilson, Bob Smith and the majority of AA members, they envisioned paid AA missionaries and free or inexpensive treatment centers. But initial fundraising efforts failed.

In 1938, Bill Wilson's brother-in-law Leonard Strong contacted Willard Richardson, who arranged for a meeting with A. Leroy Chapman, an assistant to John D. Rockefeller Jr. Wilson envisioned receiving millions of dollars to fund AA missionaries and treatment centers, but Rockefeller refused, saying money would spoil things. Instead, he agreed to contribute $5,000 in $30 weekly increments for Wilson and Smith to use for personal expenses.

Later, in 1940, Rockefeller also held a dinner for AA that was presided over by his son Nelson and was attended by wealthy New Yorkers as well as members of the newly founded AA. Wilson hoped the event would raise much money for the group, but upon conclusion of the dinner, Nelson stated that Alcoholics Anonymous should be financially self-supporting and that the power of AA should lie in one man carrying the message to the next, not with financial reward but only with the goodwill of its supporters.

Although Wilson would later give Rockefeller credit for the idea of AA being nonprofessional, he was initially disappointed with this consistent position; and after the first Rockefeller fundraising attempt fell short, he abandoned plans for paid missionaries and treatment centers. Instead, Wilson and Smith formed a nonprofit group called the Alcoholic Foundation and published a book that shared their personal experiences and what they did to stay sober. The book they wrote, Alcoholics Anonymous: The Story Of How More Than One Hundred Men Have Recovered From Alcoholism (the Big Book), is the "basic text" for AA members on how to stay sober, and it is from the title of this book that the group got its name.

=== Works Publishing ===
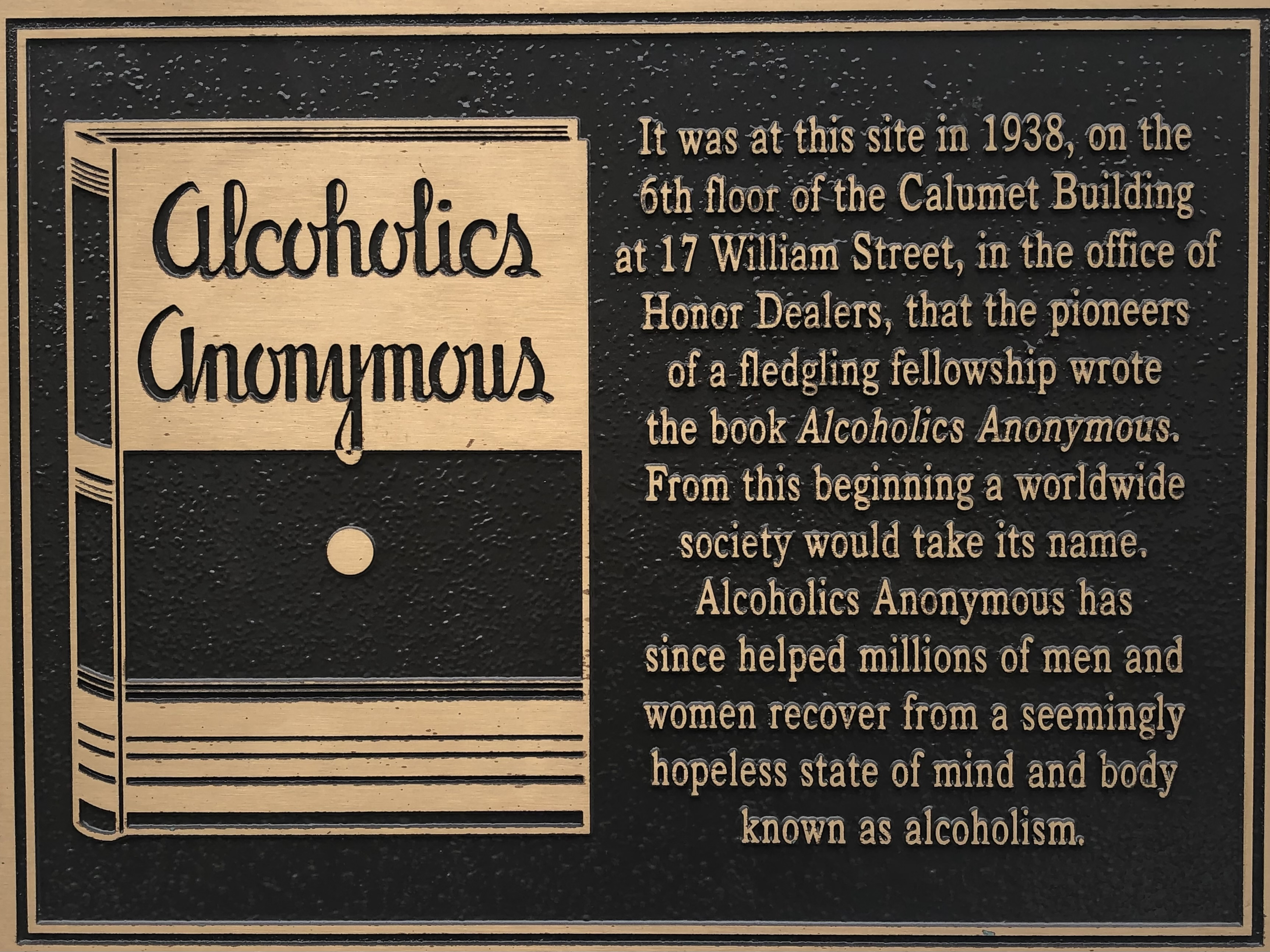
Plaque at site of Calumet Building

Much of Bill W.'s input for the book was written in 1938 at the Calumet Building in Newark, New Jersey at offices of Honor Dealers, a business of early New York member Hank P., using the secretarial services provided by Ruth Hock.

When Wilson had begun to work on the book, and as financial difficulties were encountered, the first two chapters, Bill's Story and There Is a Solution were printed to help raise money. After receiving an offer from Harper & Brothers to publish the book, Hank P., whose story The Unbeliever appears in the first edition of the "Big Book", convinced Wilson they should retain control over the book by publishing it themselves.

Hank devised a plan to form "Works Publishing, Inc.", and raise capital by selling its shares to group members and friends. With Wilson's knowledge as a stockbroker, Hank issued stock certificates, although the company was never incorporated and had no assets.

At first there was no success in selling the shares, but eventually Wilson and Hank obtained what they considered to be a promise from Reader's Digest to do a story about the book once it was completed. On the strength of that promise, AA members and friends were persuaded to buy shares, and Wilson received enough financing to continue writing the book. Subsequently, the editor of Reader's Digest claimed not to remember the promise, and the article was never published.

Bill and Hank held two-thirds of 600 company shares, and Ruth Hock also received some for pay as secretary. Two hundred shares were sold for $5,000 ($79,000 in 2008 dollar value) at $25 each ($395 in 2008 value), and they received a loan from Charlie Towns for $2,500 ($40,000 in 2008 value). This only financed writing costs, and printing would be an additional 35 cents each for the original 5,000 books. Edward Blackwell at Cornwall Press agreed to print the book with an initial $500 payment, along with a promise from Bill and Hank to pay the rest later.

Hank P. returned to drinking after four years of sobriety and could not account for Works Publishing's assets. Hank blamed Wilson for this, along with his own personal problems. By 1940, Wilson and the Trustees of the Foundation decided that the Big Book should belong to AA, so they issued some preferred shares, and with a loan from the Rockefellers they were able to call in the original shares at par value of $25 each. Hank P. initially refused to sell his 200 shares, then later showed up at Wilson's office broke and shaky. Wilson offered Hank $200 for the office furniture that belonged to Hank, provided he sign over his shares. Hank agreed to the arrangement after some prodding from Wilson. Not long after this, Wilson was granted a royalty agreement on the book that was similar to what Smith had received at an earlier date. The transaction left Hank resentful, and later he accused Wilson of profiting from Big Book royalties, something that Cleveland AA group founder Clarence S. also seriously questioned. Using principles he had learned from the Oxford Group, Wilson tried to remain cordial and supportive to both men. Works Publishing became incorporated on June 30, 1940.

=== The Twelve Steps ===
After the third and fourth chapters of the Big Book were completed, Wilson decided that a summary of methods for treating alcoholism was needed to describe their "word of mouth" program. The basic program had developed from the works of William James, Silkworth, and the Oxford Group. It included six basic steps:

1. We admitted that we were licked, that we were powerless over alcohol.
2. We made a moral inventory of our defects or sins.
3. We confessed or shared our shortcomings with another person in confidence.
4. We made restitution to all those we had harmed.
5. We tried to help other alcoholics, with no thought of reward in money or prestige.
6. We prayed to whatever God we thought there was for power to practice these precepts.

Wilson decided that the six steps needed to be broken down into smaller sections to make them easier to understand and accept. He wrote the Twelve Steps one night while lying in bed, which he felt was the best place to think. He "prayed for guidance" prior to writing, and in reviewing what he had written and numbering the new steps, he found they added up to twelve. He then thought of the Twelve Apostles and became convinced that the program should have twelve steps. With contributions from other group members, including atheists who reined in religious content (such as Oxford Group material) that could later result in controversy, by fall 1938 Wilson had expanded the six steps into the final version of the Twelve Steps, which are detailed in Chapter Five of the Big Book, called How It Works.

Many of the chapters in the Big Book were written by Wilson, including Chapter 8, To Wives. It was a chapter he had offered to Smith's wife, Anne Smith, to write, but she declined. His wife Lois had wanted to write the chapter, and his refusal to allow her left her angry and hurt. Some postulate the chapter appears to hold the wife responsible for her alcoholic husband's emotional stability once he has quit drinking.

Wilson kept track of the people whose personal stories were featured in the first edition of the Big Book. About 50 percent of them had not remained sober.

=== Promotion ===
Initially the Big Book did not sell. 5000 copies sat in the warehouse, and Works Publishing was nearly bankrupt. Morgan R., recently released from an asylum, contacted his friend Gabriel Heatter, host of the popular radio program We the People, to promote his newly found recovery through AA. The interview was considered vital to the success of AA and its book sales, so to ensure that Morgan stayed sober for the broadcast, members of AA kept him locked in a hotel room for several days under a 24-hour watch. The interview was a success, and Hank P. arranged for 20,000 postcards to be mailed to doctors announcing the Heatter broadcast and encouraging them to buy a copy of Alcoholics Anonymous: The Story Of How More Than One Hundred Men Have Recovered From Alcoholism Book sales and AA popularity also increased after positive articles in Liberty magazine in 1939 and the Saturday Evening Post in 1941.

=== Revisions ===
The second edition of the Big Book was released in 1955, the third in 1976, and the fourth in 2001. The first part of the book, which details the program, has remained largely intact, with minor statistical updates and edits. The second part contains personal stories that are updated with every edition to reflect current AA membership, resulting in earlier stories being removed – these were published separately in 2003 in the book Experience, Strength, and Hope.

=== Anonymity ===
Originally, anonymity was practiced as a result of the experimental nature of the fellowship and to protect members from the stigma of being seen as alcoholics. The name "Alcoholics Anonymous" referred to the members, not to the message. If members made their membership in AA public, especially at the level of public media, and then went out and drank again, it would not only harm the reputation of AA but threaten the very survival of the fellowship. Later, as a result of "anonymity breaks" in the public media by celebrity members of AA, Wilson determined that the deeper purpose of anonymity was to prevent alcoholic egos from seeking fame and fortune at AA expense. Wilson also saw anonymity as a principle that would prevent members from indulging in ego desires that might actually lead them to drink again – hence Tradition Twelve, which made anonymity the spiritual core of all the AA traditions, i.e., the AA guidelines.

== Into the 21st century ==
1989 movie about Bill W. and Bob Smith

As AA grew in size and popularity from over 100 members in 1939, other notable events in its history have included the following:

- 1939 AA co-founder Bill Wilson and Marty Mann founded High Watch Farm in Kent, Connecticut, the world's first 12-Step-based rehab center.
- 1941 2,000 members in 50 cities and towns. After the March 1941 Saturday Evening Post article on AA, membership tripled over the next year.
- 1944 in June, AA Grapevine magazine was published containing first-person stories of AA members. Its slogan "an AA meeting in print" was adopted after receiving supportive letters from AA members in overseas military.
- 1945 AA adopted the AA Grapevine as its national journal.
- 1946 in April, AA Grapevine first published the Twelve Traditions (in the long/original form) as Twelve Points to Assure Our Future. They were derived by Wilson from group letters to AA headquarters asking how to handle disputes over such issues as finance, publicity, and outside affiliations, and were intended to be guidelines on group conduct and avoiding controversy.
- 1949 AA Grapevine became the international journal of AA due to added readership in Canada and Europe.
- 1949 A group of recovering alcoholics and AA members founded Hazelden Farm, a Minneapolis refuge and treatment center. Since then, 93 percent of alcohol rehabilitation clinics use AA concepts in their treatment, and a reverse influence has also occurred, with AA receiving 31 percent of its membership from treatment-center referrals.
- 1950 The Twelve Traditions were unanimously adopted at AA's First International Convention.
- 1950 On November 16, Bob Smith dies. There were about 100,000 AA members.
- 1953 The Twelve Traditions were published in the book Twelve Steps and Twelve Traditions.
- 1953 Narcotics Anonymous received permission from AA to use the Twelve Steps and Twelve Traditions in its own program.
- 1955 Second Edition of the Big Book released; estimated 150,000 AA members.
- 1957 Alcoholics Anonymous Comes of Age was published.
- 1962 The Twelve Concepts for World Service were adopted by AA as a guideline for international issues.
- 1962 The movie Days of Wine and Roses depicted an alcoholic in AA.
- 1971 Bill Wilson dies. His last words to AA members were "God bless you and Alcoholics Anonymous forever."
- 1976 Third Edition of the Big Book released; estimated 1,000,000 AA members.
- 1980 Dr. Bob and the Good Oldtimers gave an account of AA development in and around Akron and Cleveland, Ohio.
- 1984 Pass It On detailed Wilson's life story.
- 1988 The movie Clean and Sober depicted such aspects of AA culture as sponsorship.
- 1989 The movie My Name Is Bill W. portrayed the AA story.
- 2001 Fourth Edition of the Big Book released; estimated 2 million or more members in 100,800 groups meeting in approximately 150 countries around the world.
- 2010 The TV movie When Love Is Not Enough: The Lois Wilson Story portrays the story of Lois and Bill Wilson, founders of Al-Anon and Alcoholics Anonymous.
- 2012 Bill W., an American biographical documentary directed by Dan Carracino and Kevin Hanlon, about William Griffith Wilson.

== See also ==
- Addiction recovery groups
- Alcohol intoxication
- List of twelve-step groups
- Substance abuse
- Recovery model
- Something to Live For

== Sources ==
- Alcoholics Anonymous (1957). Alcoholics Anonymous Comes of Age: A Brief History of A. A.. New York: Alcoholics Anonymous World Services. ISBN 091685602X.
- Alcoholics Anonymous (1984). Pass It On: The Story of Bill Wilson and How the A. A. Message Reached the World. New York: Alcoholics Anonymous World Services. ISBN 0916856127.
- Cheever, Susan (2004). My Name Is Bill: Bill Wilson – His Life and the Creation of Alcoholics Anonymous. New York: Simon & Schuster. ISBN 074320154X.
- Hartigan, Francis (2000). Bill W.: A Biography of Alcoholics Anonymous Cofounder Bill Wilson. New York: St. Martins Press. ISBN 0312200560.
- Pittman, Bill (1988). AA The Way It Began. Glen Abbey Books. ISBN 0934125082.

== Media documentaries ==
- Wright, Gwendolyn, "Alcoholics Anonymous Letter", History Detectives, Public Broadcasting Service, Season 4, Episode 7, 2006. In-depth look into the early founding days of AA, through a letter from Bill Wilson to Herbert Wallace.
