= William Silkworth =

William Silkworth may refer to:

- William Duncan Silkworth (1873–1951), doctor specializing in alcoholism
- William Sylvester Silkworth (1884–1971), American sharp shooter and stockbroker
