= Kinnon =

Kinnon is both a given name and a surname. Notable people with the name include:

- Kinnon Tatum (born 1975), American football player
- Kinnon Beaton (born 1956), Canadian musician
- Jimmy Kinnon (1911–1985), founder of Narcotics Anonymous
