= Mary Bolton (addiction counsellor) =

Irish counsellor and psychotherapist

Mary Bolton (16 September 1920 in County Donegal – 11 July 1996 in Enniskillen, County Fermanagh) was an Irish counsellor and (non-clinical) psychotherapist. A recovered alcoholic, (treated by Max Glatt), Bolton founded the Rutland Centre for addiction treatment in 1978, and co-founded the Irish branch of Narcotics Anonymous in 1983.
