= Monmouth Road =

Monmouth Road may refer to the following roads in New Jersey:

- County Route 537 (New Jersey), a major county road signed as Monmouth Road for most of its length
- County Route 15 (Monmouth County, New Jersey), a Monmouth County road signed as Monmouth Road within Ocean Township
- New Jersey Route 71, a state highway signed as Monmouth Road within the towns of Eatontown, Oceanport, and West Long Branch
