= Hank Parkhurst =

Early Alcoholics Anonymous member and publishing organizer

Henry G. "Hank" Parkhurst
- Born: March 13, 1895; Marion, Iowa, U.S.
- Died: 1954 (aged 58–59)
- Occupations: Businessman; publishing organizer
- Known for: Early member of Alcoholics Anonymous in New York; co-founder of Works Publishing; author of Big Book chapter "To Employers"

Henry Giffen "Hank" Parkhurst (March 13, 1895 – January 18, 1954) was an executive and one of the early architects of Alcoholics Anonymous (AA).

Parkhurst worked for Standard Oil as an executive before losing his job as a result of alcoholism. He became an early member of AA in New York and went on to co-founded the publishing company, Works Publishing, that produced the first edition of the AA bible The Big Book in 1939. Parkhurst played a major role in organizing the publication, fundraising, and early promotion of the book. He also authored a chapter of, and his own story as an anecdote in, the book. Parkhurst struggled with his sobriety and would later relapse and leave AA. However, he was a key although often overlooked figure, in the creation and success of the organisation.

== Early life and career ==
Parkhurst was born in Marion, Iowa, on March 13, 1895. He later worked as an executive for Standard Oil of New Jersey. Owing to alcoholism, he lost his position and in 1935 was treated at Charles B. Towns Hospital in Manhattan, where he met Bill Wilson.

== Alcoholics Anonymous ==
After meeting Wilson in 1935, Parkhurst became one of the first New York members to achieve sustained sobriety and is often noted as "AA #2" in the New York contingent. He maintained a pragmatic, sometimes agnostic outlook that influenced drafting choices in the Big Book, including language such as "God as we understood Him."

=== Works Publishing and the Big Book ===
In 1938, Wilson and Parkhurst formed Works Publishing to fund and publish the fellowship’s text. Shares were sold to friends and early supporters to raise capital; Parkhurt's secretary Ruth Hock in Newark helped prepare the manuscript. Parkhurst also organized promotional efforts for the 1939 launch.

Parkhurst authored the Big Book chapter "To Employers", drawing on his business background, and his personal story appeared in the first edition as "The Unbeliever". Subsequent editions revised the stories section, and "The Unbeliever" did not remain in later editions.

By 1940, ownership of the Big Book and Works Publishing stock was transferred to AA’s Alcoholic Foundation; Wilson first assigned his shares, and Parkhurst, who had returned to drinking, later transferred his as well.

=== Newark office and related ventures ===
Parkhurst’s Newark offices (including the Calumet Building and later 17 William Street) served as early administrative hubs for the New York/New Jersey AA effort, and for his entrepreneurial ventures, notably “Honor Dealers.”

== Later life and death ==
Parkhurst’s later years included periods of relapse. He died at Mercer Hospital in Pennington, New Jersey on 18 January 1954. Evaluations of his legacy in AA histories emphasize his energetic role in getting the Big Book written, financed, and distributed despite personal struggles.

== Legacy ==
Modern scholarship highlights Parkhurst as an “unsung” or “forgotten” figure in the creation of AA’s foundational text, stressing his organizing, editorial pressure, and business drive alongside Wilson’s authorship.

"Without Hank Parkhurst’s vision and practical efforts, the Big Book might never have come into existence, and AA’s message might never have spread as widely as it did. His personal struggles, however, led to his marginalization in AA’s history."

Imperfect Prophets - Hank Parkhurst and the Overlooked Influence at the Heart of Alcoholics Anonymous, published by Flawed Vessel Press.

== Works ==
- "To Employers", in Alcoholics Anonymous (1st ed., 1939)
- "The Unbeliever", personal story in Alcoholics Anonymous (1st ed., 1939)

== See also ==
- Dr. Bob Smith
