= The Little Red Book (Alcoholics Anonymous) =

Study guide by Alcoholics Anonymous

The Little Red Book is a non-conference approved study guide to The Big Book which was also called The Big Red Book because of the thickness of its pages when it was first published.

The original title was The Twelve Steps: An Interpretation of the Twelve Steps of the Alcoholics Anonymous Program. It was endorsed by AA co-founder Dr. Bob as a companion to The Big Book. The title later became The Little Red Book with the 5th printing in 1949.

There are three separate versions:

- The Little Red Book by Anonymous, 1946. (author was Ed Webster)
- The Little Red Book Study Guide by Bill P., 1998.
- The Little Red Book For Women by Karen Casey and Bill W., 2004. features the original text of The Little Red Book along with annotated passages addressing issues related to how women experience addiction and recovery.

The books are published by Hazelden Foundation.
