= William Duncan Silkworth =

American physician

William D. Silkworth
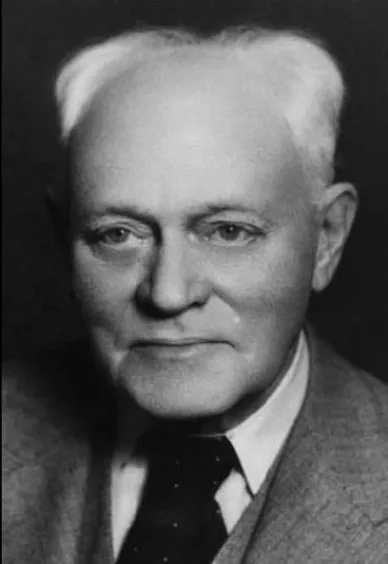
- William Silkworth
- Born: July 22, 1873; Brooklyn, NY, U.S.A.
- Died: March 22, 1951 (aged 77); Manhattan, New York
- Education: Princeton University (1896), Bellevue Hospital Medical College (1899)
- Known for: Medical treatment of alcoholism
- Notable work: The Doctor's Opinion
- Spouse: Marie Antoinette Bennett (m. 1898)

William Duncan Silkworth (July 22, 1873 – March 22, 1951) was an American physician and specialist in the treatment of alcoholism. He was director of the Charles B. Towns Hospital for Drug and Alcohol Addictions in New York City in the 1930s, during which time William Griffith Wilson, a future co-founder of Alcoholics Anonymous (A.A.), was admitted on three occasions for alcoholism. Dr. Silkworth had a profound influence on Wilson and encouraged him to realize that alcoholism was more than just an issue of moral weakness. He introduced Wilson to the idea that alcoholism had a pathological, disease-like basis.

== Early life ==
=== Birthplace ===
William Duncan Silkworth was born in Brooklyn on July 22, 1873, to parents William Silkworth and Isabelle Silkworth, née Duncan. William was the eldest of three siblings; he had a younger brother named Russel and a younger sister named Mabel.

=== Education ===
Silkworth attended Long Branch High School (then called Chattle High School), which was a three-year program when he began studying there. At the end of Silkworth's third year, the school authorities announced that they were converting the school to a four-year program. Aggrieved, Silkworth refused to return for a fourth year as he had already been accepted to Princeton University (then called the College of New Jersey).

Between 1892 and 1896, Silkworth obtained a bachelor's degree from Princeton University. It would take Silkworth several years to obtain a high school diploma; during which time, he was able to study at Princeton because the college authorities proved willing to overlook the fact that he technically had not graduated high school provided that he maintained excellent academic standings. Silkworth began his university studies as a pre-med student, but quickly developed an interest and began to specialize in neuropsychiatry.

Upon graduating from Princeton, Silkworth studied at Bellevue Hospital Medical College beginning in 1896 and graduating with a Medical Degree in 1899 after completing the four-year program in three years. While interning at Bellevue Hospital, Dr. Silkworth was exposed to many alcoholics and doctors with expertise on alcoholism since Bellevue was one of the only hospitals with a department specializing in the treatment of alcoholism in the United States at the time.

=== Marriage ===
Silkworth married Marie Antoinette Bennett in Manhattan on July 22, 1898. On February 27, 1909, his wife gave birth to a son who lived for only six days before dying on March 4, 1909. The couple would have no other children, though they remained married all their lives.

== Treatment of alcoholism ==
During Dr. Silkworth's career, he is estimated to have treated more than 40,000 alcoholics and was regarded as one of the world's leading experts in the field. In 1937, risking his professional reputation, Dr. Silkworth published a pair of articles in the Medical Record titled "Alcoholism as a Manifestation of Allergy" and "Reclamation of the Alcoholic" wherein he proposed a physical disease model of alcoholism and a psychotherapeutic treatment method that induced patients to admit powerlessness over their addiction and to adopt a new moral psychology. In the latter paper, Dr. Silkworth describes five case studies of patients that he had treated for alcoholism at the Towns Hospital; in Case V, Dr. Silkworth describes the successful recovery of Bill Wilson who was already in the early stages of founding the organization that would come to be known as Alcoholics Anonymous.

== 'The Doctor's Opinion' ==
During 1938 and 1939, Dr. Silkworth wrote letters in support of Alcoholics Anonymous which were included in a chapter titled "The Doctor's Opinion" in the book Alcoholics Anonymous and helped to provide the nascent organization with credibility. Crucially, he described the powerlessness of alcoholism as an obsession of the mind that compels one to drink and an allergy of the body that condemns one to go mad or die. Dr. Silkworth further observed that alcoholics could recover if they could obtain an essential psychic change brought about with the aid of a "Higher Power."

== End of life ==
Dr. Silkworth died at Towns Hospital on March 22, 1951, after suffering a heart attack. He is buried at the Glenwood Cemetery in West Long Branch, New Jersey.

== See also ==
- History of Alcoholics Anonymous
