= Jimmy Kinnon =

Primary founder of Narcotics Anonymous

James Patrick Kinnon (5 April 1911 – 9 July 1985), commonly known as Jimmy Kinnon or "Jimmy K.", was one of the primary founders of Narcotics Anonymous (NA), a worldwide fellowship of recovering addicts. During his lifetime, he was usually referred to as "Jimmy K." due to NA's principle of personal anonymity on the public level. He never referred to himself as a founder of NA, although the record clearly shows that he played a founding role.

== Early life ==
Kinnon was born in Paisley, Scotland on 5 April 1911, the first of seven children born to James Kinnon, of Irish Catholic descent, and Elizabeth Carrick.

When Kinnon was 7, he befriended a local alcoholic whom he referred to as Mr. Crookshank. Kinnon would often find him drunk and beaten. One day he found Crookshank badly beaten up and unresponsive. Kinnon ran for help. Over the following weeks Kinnon did not see Mr. Crookshank, and after numerous inquiries, his mother took him to see him. They went to an institution of which Mr. Crookshank was now a resident. He was incoherent and using a wheelchair. Upon leaving the facility, Kinnon told his mother that when he grew up, he was going to help people like Mr. Crookshank.

Jimmy Kinnon and his family emigrated to the United States on August 8, 1923. His family living in Philadelphia, he attended a Catholic seminary in nearby Germantown section of Philadelphia and had plans, or his parents had plans for him, of entering the priesthood, which meant six rigorous years of training. But he was progressively using paregoric, alcohol and codeine pills from late childhood until he got clean in Alcoholics Anonymous in 1950. He eventually became a roofer and painter. He met his future first wife Agnes Cragin and married her in Philadelphia in 1934. They had five children together in California where they moved in the early 1940s.

== Getting clean ==
Kinnon stopped using all mood and mind-altering substances on 2 February 1950. He began attending Alcoholics Anonymous, a twelve-step program. While in Alcoholics Anonymous he met other members who had struggled with addiction to substances other than alcohol, Due to its "singleness of purpose" principle, Alcoholics Anonymous often discouraged members from talking about addictions other than alcohol, but never prevented attendance by anyone. Kinnon attended meetings of another group called Habit-forming Drugs but was disappointed with it. He also saw the need to recover from more than the symptom, i.e. substance used (alcohol, pills, etc.), by addressing the addict's thinking and attitudes before, during and after using. This is why later on, for NA, he and the other founders would change the language of Step One of the Twelve Steps of AA from "We admitted we were powerless over ALCOHOL, that our lives had become unmanageable" to "We admitted we were powerless over OUR ADDICTION, that our lives had become unmanageable".

== Formation of Narcotics Anonymous ==
In the summer of 1953 Jimmy Kinnon and other members of Alcoholics Anonymous began holding their own separate meetings, which they called Narcotics Anonymous. They were given permission from Alcoholics Anonymous to adapt the AA Twelve Steps, and to change Step One from "We admitted we were powerless over alcohol..." to "We admitted we were powerless over our addiction..." as stated before. This was a significant change of focus from the AA program, because NA is then focused on recovery from the disease of addiction rather than from any particular substance use. Kinnon saw the substance use as a symptom of a deeper core issue (i.e. the obsessive thinking and compulsive behavior), from which the substances are used to gain a temporary relief. Narcotics Anonymous was officially founded in July 1953 in Sun Valley, California.

There was at the time a different organization also called Narcotics Anonymous that was previously founded in the 1940s by a recovering addict named Danny Carlsen in New York City, but it was more of a social-services organization than a Twelve-Step Fellowship, and it did not follow the Twelve Traditions. It was never connected to the Narcotics Anonymous Kinnon and his mates started in Sun Valley and died out in the mid-1960s.

In the book My Years with Narcotics Anonymous Bob Stone wrote about the contribution of Jimmy:

Details about the origins of today's Narcotics Anonymous come from a variety of sources, some of which corroborate other sources while others are contradictory. The most obvious source is the information Jimmy K. wrote in the "We Do Recover" segment of The Little White Booklet and records of group business meetings. The second source is the oral history Jimmy left us over the years. The third is the oral history from other people who were there at the time or who may have had discussions with the early participants.

— Bob Stone, My Years with Narcotics Anonymous

== Literature ==
Most of Narcotics Anonymous early literature was written by Jimmy Kinnon and is still used worldwide today in over 70,000 NA meetings. He was the main contributor to the Yellow Booklet and Little White Booklet that were used throughout the 1960s and 1970s. From 1953 to 1977 Narcotics Anonymous had only a set of pamphlets and booklets as literature. From 1979 to 1982 hundreds of Narcotics Anonymous members from the "new" generation of drug users of the sixties and seventies expanded on this literature and created The Basic Text. Kinnon also designed the NA logo, The Group Logo, The Service Symbol and wrote the Gratitude Prayer and Fruit of the Harvest statement found in the beginning of The Basic Text. This book was the first ever known that was written by recovering addicts for recovering addicts. It was first published in 1982. 9.3 million copies of The Basic Text have been published since 1982, in 31 languages.

== Death ==
Jimmy Kinnon, who had fought a battle against tuberculosis from the late fifties on, died of lung cancer on 9 July 1985, in California. Prior to his death he said, "if he ever had a headstone it would read, "All we did was sow some seeds and work and wrought to make this work, so that we and others could live. In Peace, in Freedom and in Love". He was clean for thirty five years at the time of his death.

== See also ==
- Narcotics Anonymous
- Twelve Steps
- Twelve Traditions
