= Boylan Act =

Piece of April 1914 legislation in New York State regarding narcotics and addiction

The Boylan Act (or the Boylan Bill or the Towns-Boylan Act) was a piece of April 1914 legislation in New York State, dealing with narcotics and addiction. The Act predated the federal 1915 Harrison Act, and in some ways anticipated it. Charles B. Towns, one of the sponsors of the Act, stated "it takes only five or six days to cure a drug fiend in hospital."

== Provisions ==
- That opium and morphine be dispensed only by pharmacists, with a written prescription from a physician
- Any prescription for opiates required a physical examination by a doctor to establish necessity
- Prescriptions exceeding four grains of morphine, 30 grains of opium, two grains of heroin, or six grains of heroin must be verified by the dispensing pharmacist with a phone call to the prescribing physician
- Only physicians and pharmacists may dispense syringes or hypodermic needles
- Per Section 249a, addicts who break the law may be institutionalized for addiction treatment, and addicts resisting treatment could be forced to enter an institution for vagrants

== Overturning ==
In 1917, the Whitney Act weakened the Boylan Act by allowing physicians to prescribe narcotics to addicts in the course of treating their addiction.

The Act was later overturned, as it had the unintended consequence of stimulating the black market for narcotics.
