= Marty Mann =

American writer (1904–1980)

Margaret Marty Mann (October 15, 1904 – July 22, 1980) was an American writer and the first woman to achieve longterm sobriety in Alcoholics Anonymous.

There were several women in the early days of AA, including Florence R. of New York, Sylvia K. of Chicago, and Ethel M. of Akron, Ohio. AA co-founder Bill Wilson was Marty's sponsor. Marty wrote her story (personal experience) "Women Suffer Too" in the stories section of second through fourth editions of the Big Book of AA.

Mann organized the National Committee for Education on Alcoholism (NCEA) in 1944. She traveled across the U.S. educating medical professionals, legislators, businessmen, and the public on the importance of treatment and education of the fatal disease of alcoholism.

In 1976, the NCA organized Operation Understanding where 50 people of relative fame gathered to address the social stigma surrounding alcoholism. Actors, politicians, sports people, physicians, lawyers, clergy, and more stood in the hotel ballroom and said "I am an alcoholic." The NCA hoped to reduce the social stigma surrounding alcoholism and encourage individuals and their families to get treatment. Mann hoped to raise social awareness that alcoholism is a deadly disease rather than a moral failure.

== Background ==
Marty Mann was born in Chicago into an upper-middle-class family, the daughter of William Henry Mann and Lillian Christy Mann. She attended private schools, traveled extensively, and was a debutante. Mann's father, once a top executive at the most prestigious department store in downtown Chicago, died of alcoholism.

Marty was a lesbian but was married briefly in her 20s. Mann was her maiden name, and she used the Mrs. title to protect her privacy. Society's prejudice against homosexuality was as strong as it was toward alcoholism during the 1940s and 1950s when she and the National Committee for Education on Alcoholism were struggling to survive.

Mann moved to England in 1930 and fell in love with photographer Barbara Ker-Seymer. The Tate Museum in London has photographs detailing their social circle. British photographer and society figure, considered one of the group designated by the tabloid press as "Bright Young People". They visited the Paris salon of Gertrude Stein and Alice B. Toklas. She also socialized with Janet Flanner, Virginia Woolf, and Vita Sackville-West.

She worked as a magazine editor, art critic, and photojournalist for Vogue, Harper's, and Tatler. However, her alcoholism had progressed to the point where she was no longer able to hold a job, drifting in and out of homelessness while living abroad in London.

Her alcoholism escalated, and she spent six months in a London Hospital after a second suicide attempt. She was encouraged to return home to the U.S. by her friends. In 1936, she returned to her family in the United States and sought help from doctors. She quickly became a charity patient at Bellevue Hospital in New York City. She eventually transferred to Blythewood Sanitarium in Greenwich, Connecticut. In 1939, her psychiatrist Dr. Harry Tiebout gave her a pre-publication manuscript of the book Alcoholics Anonymous, and he persuaded her to attend her first AA meeting. This meeting took place at the home of Lois and Bill W (co-founder of AA) at 182 Clinton Street in Brooklyn, New York.

Marty was involved romantically with Priscilla Peck for 40 years. Priscilla was an art editor at Vogue for 25 years. They owned a home together in Greenwich Village in New York City, a vacation home at Cherry Grove on Fire Island and later in life they had a home in Connecticut.

== Encouraging a change in viewpoint ==
In 1945, Mann became inspired to eliminate the stigma and ignorance regarding alcoholism and to encourage the "disease model" which viewed it as a medical/psychological problem, not a moral failing. She helped start the Yale School of Alcohol Studies (now at Rutgers) and organized the National Committee for Education on Alcoholism (NCEA), now the National Council on Alcoholism and Drug Dependence or NCADD.

She believed alcoholism runs in the family, and education of the disease was essential.

Three ideas formed the basis of her message:

1. Alcoholism is a disease and the alcoholic a sick person.
2. The alcoholic can be helped and is worth helping.
3. Alcoholism is a public health problem and therefore a public responsibility.

Marty Mann and R. Brinkley Smithers funded Dr. E. Morton (Bunky) Jellinek's initial 1946 study on Alcoholism. Dr. Jellinek's study was based on a narrow, selective study of a hand-picked group of members of Alcoholics Anonymous (AA) who had returned a self-reporting questionnaire.

In the 1950s, Edward R. Murrow included her in his list of the "10 Greatest Living Americans". Her book New Primer on Alcoholism was published in 1958.

== Legacy ==
Marty Mann wrote the following books:

Primer on Alcoholism

Marty Mann's New Primer on Alcoholism

Marty Mann Answers Your Questions about Alcoholism.

Mann was instrumental in the founding of High Watch Farm, the world's first recovery center founded on the principles of Alcoholics Anonymous.

In 1980, Mann suffered a stroke at home and died soon after, aged 75.
