= Charles B. Towns =

American addiction treatment specialist and writer (1862-1947)

- Born: Charles Barnes Towns; 1862; Georgia, US
- Died: 1947 (aged 84–85)
- Known for: Drug control bills Founding Charles B. Towns Hospital

Charles Barnes Towns (1862–1947) conducted experimentation with cures for alcoholism and drug addiction, and helped draft drug control legislation in the United States during the early 20th century.

== Biography ==
Charles B. Towns was born in LaGrange, Georgia, in 1862 on a small farm, the son of a Confederate cavalry man. In his youth he worked as a farm hand; and was noted for his animal handling skills. He later moved into railroading and eventually sold life insurance, at which he was successful. He then moved to New York, and between 1901 and 1904 he had a partnership in a brokerage firm that failed. It was at this time he was approached by a mysterious unnamed individual who claimed that he had a cure for drug addictions such as heroin, opium and alcoholism. The mysterious person suggested to Towns they could make a lot of money from it.

In spite of Towns' own doctor stating the cure was ridiculous, Towns set out to find addicted people by placing ads for "drug fiends" who wanted to be cured. Towns by this time had read all the known literature on drug addiction and alcoholism. By trial and error, Towns refined his cure over time. His reputation spread in the criminal underworld and he treated addicted gangsters. Towns involved Dr. Alexander Lambert in his venture; Dr. Lambert was a professor at Cornell University Medical College, who as a physician to President Theodore Roosevelt informed various people in government about the Towns-Lambert cure. Towns was eventually sent by the US government to China to assist with the recovery of some of the 160 million drug addicts in the country. By 1908 while in China, Towns claimed to have cured thousands by his methods.

Towns was one of the first to identify the disease model of substance abuse. He lobbied tirelessly to prohibit the sale of hypodermic needles unless prescribed, to pass laws against driving while impaired, and for drug and alcohol education at a time when the subjects were politely avoided. Between the years 1910 and 1920 he aided in the drafting of the Boylan Bill and the Harrison Act.

Towns claimed a 90% success rate from his cure based on the reasoning that those people he never heard from again had been cured, but as his claims regarding his cure became more exaggerated, Towns' reputation by the 1920s greatly diminished in the medical community. The Towns-Lambert cure was viewed as bordering on quackery.

Lambert eventually broke off his association with Towns Hospital. Towns was making claims that his cure was guaranteed to work for any compulsive behavior, from morphinism to nicotinism to caffeinism, to kleptomania and bedwetting. Lambert realized that the percentage of those deemed to be cured needed to be greatly reduced since he had observed that a number of people over the years kept returning for cure after cure. During the 1920s a large part of the hospital revenues was from repeat business.

== The Belladonna Cure ==
The formula for the Towns-Lambert Alcoholism Cure, also known as the Belladonna Cure, was the deliriant Atropa belladonna, commonly known as belladonna or deadly nightshade. The effects of belladonna include delirium, hallucinations, light sensitivity, confusion, and dry mouth. The second ingredient in the mixture was another deliriant, Hyoscyamus niger, also known as henbane, hog's bean, or insane root. It contained two alkaloids, hyoscyamine and hyoscine. The third major ingredient was the dried bark or berries of Xanthoxylum americanum, or prickly ash, added to help with diarrhea and intestinal cramps. The dosage given was determined by the physiologic reaction of each patient. When the face became flushed, the throat dry, and the eyes dilated, the amount of the mixture was reduced or stopped.

The mixture was given every hour, day and night, for nearly 50 hours. The end of the treatment was marked by the abundance of stools and then castor oil was given to the patient as a further purgative. The treatment was also described as 'puke and purge'.

Every 12 hours the patient was given CC (Compound Cathartic) pills and Blue Mass. These were 19th century medications of varying composition. Blue Mass included mercury, and was prescribed for a cornucopia of ailments.

When a patient was admitted to the hospital while intoxicated or at the end of a spree, the first thing that was done was to put the patient to sleep. The only medication given prior to the hypnotic was the four CC pills. The hypnotic Lambert found best contained chloral hydrate and morphine along with one or two grams of paraldehyde. If the patient went to sleep easily on this hypnotic it was safe to wake him every hour for his belladonna regimen. Dr Lambert believed it was important to administer a small amount of strychnine every four hours. The week following the treatment a diet of a special tonic and simple and easy to digest meals would relax the patient.

== Towns Hospital ==
Charles B. Towns reportedly began treating patients as early as 1901. His obituary stated that he began working with doctors in 1903. In 1905, he advertised a cure for the “opium habit,” using a secret formula, in the New York Times. He had partnered with a physician named Dr. Mariette G. McGinnis for a couple of years, reportedly operating an opium cure business out of her office.

In June 1905, he operated his “cure” from 119 West 81st Street with McGinniss, a servant and a nurse, according to the New York City census. His wife and son also lived at this address. He and McGinniss are listed as head of household.

The Charles B. Towns Hospital opened in 1909, the year the Towns-Lambert Cure formula was published. In 1914, the hospital moved to 293 Central Park West. Four onsite physicians were residents there. He retained the 81st Street facility as an “annex” for people who could not afford treatment at the new hospital, with its 50 beds and rooftop solarium, on Central Park.

The roaring twenties and the increase in alcoholism contributed to the hospital’s success. However, after the stock market crash of 1929 admissions to the hospital had significantly declined.

The hospital aimed at drying out the well-to-do patient. It was an expensive detoxification facility and one was not admitted unless the fee was paid in advance or a backer guaranteed to pay the fee which in those days was $200 to $350 for a five-day stay. W. C. Fields, Lillian Russell, and John Barrymore reportedly required the treatment that Towns provided. At this time the Chief of Staff was Dr. William Duncan Silkworth.

After Towns’ death in 1947, his son Edward, a Columbia University graduate who practiced law until 1940, operated the hospital until it closed in 1965, after fifty years of treating alcoholics and addicts. The building is now residential.

== Literature ==
Towns wrote three important books on alcoholism. These were Habits That Handicap in 1915, which was given a review in the New York Times, Reclaiming the Drinker in 1931, and Alcohol and Drug Sickness in 1934.

== Influences ==
=== Corporations ===
It was Towns' belief that lack of occupation was the destroyer of men; helping the alcoholic was useless if the man had no job to which he could return. He promoted the idea of educational plans to enlighten people on the hazards of drinking along with the idea that society was to blame for the problem of alcohol hence society needed to take responsibility for those who lost control of their drinking.

It was during the period from 1910 to the 1930s that Towns encouraged corporations and big institutions to help alcoholics while they were still on the job.

=== Alcoholics Anonymous ===
Bill Wilson, cofounder of Alcoholics Anonymous (AA), was admitted to Towns Hospital four times between 1933 and 1934. On his last stay, beginning December 11, 1934, the date of his last drink, he showed signs of delirium tremens and was treated with the Belladonna Cure. Three days later, Wilson underwent a so-called “white light experience," also known as a spiritual awakening, which occurred on Friday, December 14, 1934.

Wilson's description: "All at once I found myself crying out, ‘If there is a God, let Him show himself! I am ready to do anything, anything!’ Suddenly the room lit up with a great white light. I was caught up in an ecstasy which there are no words to describe. It seemed to me in my mind's eye, that I was on a mountain and that a wind not of air but of spirit was blowing. And then it burst upon me that I was a free man. Slowly the ecstasy subsided. I lay there on the bed, but now for a time I was in another world, a new world of consciousness... and I thought to myself, ‘So this is the God of the preachers!’ A great peace stole over me."

Earlier that evening, Wilson’s old drinking buddy, Ebby Thacher, a member of the Oxford Group who had impressed Wilson by getting sober with the help of spirituality, had visited and tried to persuade Wilson to turn himself over to the care of a “power greater than himself,” in Wilson’s case a Christian-based deity, who would liberate him from alcohol. It was at Towns Hospital during this last stay that Wilson first read William James’ 1902 book, The Varieties of the Religious Experience, which Thatcher had brought to him. Wilson would credit its author, philosopher and psychologist William James, as among the founders of Alcoholics Anonymous.

Before Wilson’s last stay at Towns Hospital, Ebby Thacher sat at the kitchen table in Wilson’s Brooklyn home, in mid November 1934, and spoke about finding sobriety through help from the Oxford Group, the Christian-based, nondenominational revivalistic movement that would eventually help Wilson achieve sobriety. Wilson consequently used some of the principles of the Oxford Group, among several sources, to develop AA.

Towns became a supporter and creditor of Alcoholics Anonymous, lending Wilson $2500 ($53,000 in 2023 dollar values) to enable him to write what became "The Big Book" of Alcoholics Anonymous. In July 1939, on the rooftop of the Towns Hospital, Charlie Townsend announced to Wilson that he told the AA story to a writer who would publish it in Liberty, which led to the sale of several hundred Big Books. He also offered Wilson, who had been unemployed for several years, a job as a lay therapist, which Wilson declined.

== Sources ==
- Alcoholics Anonymous. Pass it On The Story of Bill Wilson and How The A.A. Message Reached the World, New York: Alcoholics Anonymous World Services, Inc., 1984
- Cheevers, Susan. My Name is Bill, Simon & Schuster, 2004
- Neidhardt, Gary W.. King Charles of New York City: The Life of Charles Barnes Towns. United States, Westwood Books Publishing LLC, 2018.
- Pittman, Bill. AA: the Way it Began, Glenn Abbey Books, 1988
