= Glenwood Cemetery West Long Branch =

Cemetery in Monmouth County, New Jersey

Coordinates: 40°17′42″N 74°01′33″W

Glenwood Cemetery is located in West Long Branch, Monmouth County, New Jersey. The cemetery is located at the intersection of Route 36 and Monmouth Road.

== Notable interments ==
- Mike Donlin, a.k.a. "Turkey Mike" (1878–1933), Major League Baseball Player and movie actor; known as "Turkey Mike" because of his unique strut
- George Fotheringham (1883–1971), Scottish-American professional golfer
- Wallace McCutcheon Sr. (1862–1918), cinematographer and director
- Arthur Pryor, (1870–1942), jazz trombonist and bandleader with the Sousa Band and New Jersey politician
