= Twelve Traditions =

Organizational principles developed by Bill Wilson for Alcoholics Anonymous

The Twelve Traditions of twelve-step programs provide guidelines for relationships between the twelve-step groups, members, other groups, the global fellowship, and society at large. Questions of finance, public relations, donations, and purpose are addressed in the traditions. They were originally written by Bill Wilson after the founding of the first twelve-step group, Alcoholics Anonymous (AA).

== Origins ==
Several of the tenets of what was to become AA's Twelve Traditions were first expressed in the foreword to the first edition of the Big Book of Alcoholics Anonymous in 1939. By 1944 the number of AA groups had grown, along with the number of letters being sent to the AA headquarters in New York asking how to handle disputes caused by issues like publicity, religion, and finances. By 1946 AA cofounder Bill Wilson had formulated the basic ideas for the Twelve Traditions based on this correspondence with groups (via the group conscience method), setting guidelines on how groups and members should interact with each other, the public, and AA as a whole. The traditions were first published in the April 1946 AA Grapevine under the title Twelve Points to Assure Our Future and were formally adopted at AA's first international convention in 1950. Wilson's book on the subject, Twelve Steps and Twelve Traditions, was published in April 1953.

== The Twelve Traditions of Alcoholics Anonymous ==
1. Our common welfare should come first; personal recovery depends upon AA unity.
2. For our group purpose there is but one ultimate authority — a loving God as He may express Himself in our group conscience. Our leaders are but trusted servants; they do not govern.
3. The only requirement for AA membership is a desire to stop drinking.
4. Each group should be autonomous except in matters affecting other groups or AA as a whole.
5. Each group has but one primary purpose — to carry its message to the alcoholic who still suffers.
6. An AA group ought never endorse, finance, or lend the AA name to any related facility or outside enterprise, lest problems of money, property, and prestige divert us from our primary purpose.
7. Every AA group ought to be fully self-supporting, declining outside contributions.
8. AA should remain forever non-professional, but our service centers may employ special workers.
9. AA, as such, ought never be organized; but we may create service boards or committees directly responsible to those they serve.
10. AA has no opinion on outside issues; hence the AA name ought never be drawn into public controversy.
11. Our public relations policy is based on attraction rather than promotion; we need always maintain personal anonymity at the level of press, radio, and films.
12. Anonymity is the spiritual foundation of all our traditions, ever reminding us to place principles before personalities.

=== Long Form ===
Our AA experience has taught us that:

1. Each member of AA is but a small part of a great whole. AA must continue to live or most of us will surely die. Hence our common welfare comes first. But individual welfare follows close afterward.
2. For our group purpose there is but one ultimate authority — a loving God as He may express Himself in our group conscience.
3. Our membership ought to include all who suffer from alcoholism. Hence we may refuse none who wish to recover. Nor ought AA membership ever depend upon money or conformity. Any two or three alcoholics gathered together for sobriety may call themselves an AA group, provided that, as a group, they have no other affiliation.
4. With respect to its own affairs, each AA group should be responsible to no other authority than its own conscience. But when its plans concern the welfare of neighboring groups also, those groups ought to be consulted. And no group, regional committee, or individual should ever take any action that might greatly affect AA as a whole without conferring with the trustees of the General Service Board. On such issues our common welfare is paramount.
5. Each AA group ought to be a spiritual entity having but one primary purpose — that of carrying its message to the alcoholic who still suffers.
6. Problems of money, property, and authority may easily divert us from our primary spiritual aim. We think, therefore, that any considerable property of genuine use to AA should be separately incorporated and managed, thus dividing the material from the spiritual. An AA group, as such, should never go into business. Secondary aids to AA, such as clubs or hospitals which require much property or administration, ought to be incorporated and so set apart that, if necessary, they can be freely discarded by the groups. Hence such facilities ought not to use the AA name. Their management should be the sole responsibility of those people who financially support them. For clubs, AA managers are usually preferred. But hospitals, as well as other places of recuperation, ought to be well outside AA — and medically supervised. While an AA group may cooperate with anyone, such cooperation ought never go so far as affiliation or endorsement, actual or implied. An AA group can bind itself to no one.
7. The AA groups themselves ought to be fully supported by the voluntary contributions of their own members. We think that each group should soon achieve this ideal; that any public solicitation of funds using the name of AA is highly dangerous, whether by groups, clubs, hospitals, or other outside agencies; that acceptance of large gifts from any source, or of contributions carrying any obligation whatever, is unwise. Then too, we view with much concern those AA treasuries which continue, beyond prudent reserves, to accumulate funds for no stated AA purpose. Experience has often warned us that nothing can so surely destroy our spiritual heritage as futile disputes over property, money, and authority.
8. AA should remain forever non-professional. We define professionalism as the occupation of counseling alcoholics for fees or hire. But we may employ alcoholics where they are going to perform those services for which we may otherwise have to engage nonalcoholics. Such special services may be well recompensed. But our usual AA "12 Step" work is never to be paid for.
9. Each AA group needs the least possible organization. Rotating leadership is the best. The small group may elect its secretary, the large group its rotating committee, and the groups of a large metropolitan area their central or intergroup committee, which often employs a full-time secretary. The trustees of the General Service Board are, in effect, our AA General Service Committee. They are the custodians of our AA Tradition and the receivers of voluntary AA contributions by which we maintain our AA General Service Office at New York. They are authorized by the groups to handle our over-all public relations and they guarantee the integrity of our principal newspaper, the AA Grapevine. All such representatives are to be guided in the spirit of service, for true leaders in AA are but trusted and experienced servants of the whole. They derive no real authority from their titles; they do not govern. Universal respect is the key to their usefulness.
10. No AA group or member should ever, in such a way as to implicate AA, express any opinion on outside controversial issues — particularly those of politics, alcohol reform, or sectarian religion. The AA groups oppose no one. Concerning such matters they can express no views whatever.
11. Our relations with the general public should be characterized by personal anonymity. We think AA ought to avoid sensational advertising. Our names and pictures as AA members ought not be broadcast, filmed, or publicly printed. Our public relations should be guided by the principle of attraction rather than promotion. There is never need to praise ourselves. We feel it better to let our friends recommend us.
12. And finally, we of AA believe that the principle of anonymity has an immense spiritual significance. It reminds us that we are to place principles before personalities; that we are actually to practice a genuine humility. This to the end that our great blessings may never spoil us; that we shall forever live in thankful contemplation of Him who presides over us all.

== The Traditions in other twelve-step programs ==
Other twelve-step programs make small changes to the original Twelve Traditions used in AA and offer interpretations specific to their programs. The Twelve Traditions of Narcotics Anonymous (NA), the second largest twelve-step program, are as stated in the above (short form only) with all instances of AA replaced with NA, the word alcoholic replaced with the word addiction, and the word drinking replaced with the word using. NA published their It Works: How and Why as its own study of the Twelve Traditions.

Marijuana Anonymous has made similar changes to adapt the traditions to marijuana use, and has gone a step further by eliminating male pronouns in reference to God. This parallels the wording of MA's Twelve Steps. The MA Steps and Traditions are listed and expanded upon in MA's text, Life With Hope.

== Singleness of purpose ==
AA's Singleness of Purpose is a principle derived from the Fifth Tradition of AA, "Each group has but one primary purpose—to carry its message to the alcoholic who still suffers." Other groups replace the word alcoholic with the identifying characteristic of their fellowship, or otherwise rephrase it to have a similar meaning. For instance, in Marijuana Anonymous that member would be a marijuana addict, while in Narcotics Anonymous that member would be an addict. The principle is based on the philosophy that those that share common physical cravings and mental obsessions can best understand and help those that are struggling with their specific addictions. AA founder Bill Wilson wrote in the February 1958 AA Grapevine that

We cannot give AA membership to non-alcoholic narcotics-addicts. But like anyone else, they should be able to attend certain open AA meetings, provided, of course, that the groups themselves are willing. AA members who are so inclined should be encouraged to band together in groups to deal with sedative and drug problems. But they ought to refrain from calling themselves AA groups. There seems to be no reason why several AAs cannot join, if they wish, with a group of straight addicts to solve the alcohol and the drug problem together. But, obviously, such a "dual purpose" group should not insist that it be called an AA group nor should it use the AA name in its title. Neither should its "straight addict" contingent be led to believe that they have become AA members by reason of such an association. Certainly there is every good reason for interested AAs to join with "outside" groups, working on the narcotic problem, provided the Traditions of anonymity and of "no endorsements" are respected.

— Bill W., AA Grapevine

== See also ==
- Addiction recovery groups
- History of Alcoholics Anonymous
- Self-help groups for mental health
- List of twelve-step groups
- Twelve-step program
- Alcoholics Anonymous
- Narcotics Anonymous
