= High Watch Recovery Center =

Alcohol and drug recovery center in Connecticut, US

- Type: Private non-profit
- Industry: Rehabilitation
- Founded: 1939
- Headquarters: Kent, Connecticut, United States
- Key people: Bill Wilson; Marty Mann
- Number of employees: 90+
- Website: highwatchrecovery.org

High Watch Recovery Center is an alcohol and drug addiction recovery center located in Kent, Connecticut. It was the first recovery center in the World founded on the principles of Alcoholics Anonymous (AA).

== History ==
High Watch Recovery Center is a seventy-eight-bed treatment center which began in 1939 as High Watch Farm. It is the oldest such facility based on the program of Alcoholics Anonymous, inspired but not founded by Bill Wilson, the co-founder of Alcoholics Anonymous.

The farm was previously called Joy Farm since 1926 and had been the site of a residential community of spiritual seekers. These seekers were followers of a teacher named Emma Curtis Hopkins who was renowned in her time and boasted a following of 50,000 students. Hopkins, known as "The Teacher of Teachers," was one of the major founders of the New Thought movement that today still informs such major churches as Unity Church.

In 1939 the farm was bought and was operated by a philanthropist and heiress from the Winthrop and Stuyvesant families, Etheldred F. Folsom, who was a devotee of Hopkins. She continued to utilize the farm as a spiritual retreat center where she disseminated Hopkins' teachings under "The Ministry of the High Watch". Folsom preferred to be known as Sister Francis in the manner of the Quakers and in honor of her favorite saint, Saint Francis of Assisi. High Watch Recovery Center was founded that year when Folsom met Marty Mann and Bill Wilson, who had recently founded Alcoholics Anonymous.

Marty Mann, Bill Wilson, his wife Lois, and other friends drove to Kent, Connecticut, to meet Sister Francis at Joy Farm in the fall of 1939. It was a historic weekend, ending in Sister Francis asking Bill W. to take over the farm because she felt his program aligned with her beliefs and he could find more success with alcoholics than she had. Wilson refused, saying AA couldn't own property. Eventually, it was decided that Sister Francis would retain land title and AA would run the recovery program.

Mann later said of her first encounter with High Watch Farm, "There was something there, something that was really palpable that you could feel, and every one of us felt it. To say that we fell in love with it is not to use the right terminology at all. We were engulfed... What is at the Farm was at the Farm before we ever found it. It found us, in my opinion."

Marty Mann was an early ally of Bill W.’s in founding AA, often thought of as the third co-founder. The earliest and most significant friend of High Watch Farm, she had her own cabin there, and for a year her mother ran the Farm. Her speech at the 25th Anniversary of High Watch is notable for her description of the historic meeting of Bill W. and Sister Francis. A celebrated speaker, Mann was Bill W.’s chosen replacement on the speaker’s platform when he was too ill to appear.

In later years, Ebby Thacher, the man Bill Wilson would refer to as "my sponsor", would be a guest at High Watch.

The High Watch board, with its new AA members, were startled awake in July 1941, when Sister Francis, board president, declared herself physically incapable of setting foot on her own land and Marty Mann abruptly resigned her secretary position on the board. "The vision is lost," Sister Francis mourned.

It turned out that a psychologist, a recovering alcoholic, had been put in place as director of the new High Watch Farm. Though he agreed to operate "in full collaboration with AA," he later decided that only what he alone had to offer would work.

Alerted by Marty and Sister Francis, Bill W. wrote to the director about this "impasse" in a strong, mediating letter. Not long after, the director resigned peacefully, and Sister Francis, Marty Mann and Alcoholics Anonymous returned to High Watch Farm.

AA is constantly evaluated by scholars and historians, who consider this historic 1941 fight for the return of Alcoholics Anonymous to High Watch Farm to be one of the major "tests" that foreshadowed AA's future success. This marks High Watch's status as a landmark site in the history of AA.

High Watch is listed in the compendium of "Places and Things in AA History".

== Clinical care ==
The High Watch program of addiction recovery addresses the neurobiology of addiction and co-occurring disorders (such as depression, anxiety or bi-polar disorder) and residents receive individual bio-psycho-social evaluation. Once identified, biological interventions to repair brain neural and neurotransmitter systems damaged by addiction are integrated into the individual's Twelve Step recovery program.

A new facility was opened in October 2012 with Lt. Governor Nancy Wyman and then-Board member Susan Saint James in attendance to cut the ribbon.

In November 2016, High Watch opened a new facility called the Treatment Living Center. The building houses thirty-eight guests and, according to High Watch, "allows High Watch to offer a more advanced, wide range of care."

High Watch was included in Psychology Today's 2012 "Best Treatment Guide: The Referral Guide for Professionals."
