= Narcotics Anonymous =

Mutual help 12-Step organization

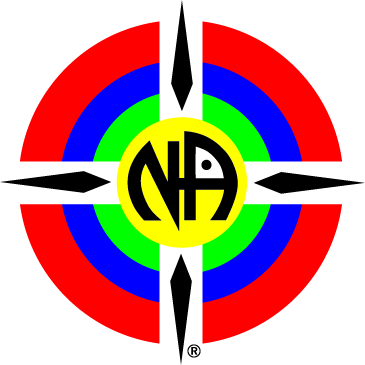
- Formation: 1953 (73 years ago)
- Founder: Jimmy Kinnon
- Type: Mutual help addiction recovery
- Purpose: Twelve-step program
- Headquarters: NA World Service Office; Chatsworth, Los Angeles, California, U.S.
- Website: na.org

The NA logo designed by Jimmy K.

The NA Service symbol designed by Jimmy K.

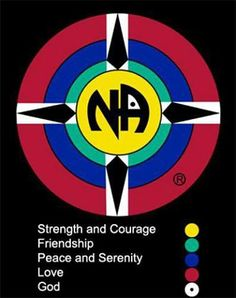
The Group Logo explained

Narcotics Anonymous (NA), founded in 1953, describes itself as a "nonprofit fellowship or society of men and women for whom drugs had become a major problem." Narcotics Anonymous uses a 12-step model developed for people with varied substance use disorders and is the second-largest 12-step organization, after 12-step pioneer Alcoholics Anonymous.

As of 2024, there were 77,000 NA meetings in 145 countries each week.

== Narcotics Anonymous program ==
All facts and quotes presented in "The Narcotics Anonymous program" section, unless otherwise sourced, come from the book Narcotics Anonymous (Basic Text).

=== Membership and organization ===
The third tradition of NA states that the only requirement for membership is "a desire to stop using". NA says its meetings are where members can "meet regularly to help each other stay clean." Membership in NA is free, and there are no dues or fees.

The foundation of the Narcotics Anonymous program is the Twelve Steps and Twelve Traditions. Narcotics Anonymous uses a slight variation of wording in both the Twelve Steps and Twelve Traditions when compared to other Twelve Step groups.

According to the Basic Text, Narcotics Anonymous "has no opinion on outside issues", including those of politics, science or medicine, and does not endorse any outside organization or institution. The fellowship does not promote itself, but rather attracts new members through public information and outreach. Individuals can also be compelled to attend by courts or rehab programs. NA groups and areas supply outside organizations with factual information regarding the NA program, and individual members may carry the NA message to hospitals and institutions, such as treatment centers and jails.

=== The nature of addiction ===
According to the philosophy of the NA program, most addicts did not realize they had a problem with drugs until they had no other choice besides ending up dead or in jail. Even if other people pointed out they may have a drug problem they were convinced otherwise. But once an addict on his or her own tries to stop and realizes they cannot, they finally see that drugs have been controlling them. Addicts "lived to use and used to live". NA helps show them a different way of life and helps them fight their disease. NA describes addiction as a progressive disease with no known cure, which affects every area of an addict's life: physical, mental, emotional, and spiritual. NA suggests that the disease of addiction can be arrested, and recovery is possible through the NA twelve-step program. The steps never mention drugs or drug use, rather they refer only to addiction, to indicate that addicts have a disease of which drug use is one symptom. In the NA program, all drugs are considered equal, and alcohol is also a drug. Other symptoms include obsession, compulsion, denial, and self-centeredness.

== Meetings ==
Regular meetings, hosted by NA groups, are the basic unit of the NA fellowship. Meetings are held in a variety of places such as church meeting rooms, libraries, hospitals, community centers, parks, or any other place that can accommodate a meeting.

Members who attend the same meeting regularly to establish a recovery network and reliable routine understand this to be their "home group". Home-group members can participate in the group's business and play an important role in deciding how the group's meetings should be conducted.

=== Formats ===
There are two basic types of meetings: "open" and "closed". Anyone is welcome to attend an open meeting, while closed meetings are limited to addicts and to people who think they may have a problem with drugs.

Meeting formats vary, but often include time devoted to the reading aloud of NA literature regarding the issues involved in living life clean which is written by and for members of NA. Many meetings are conducted by the chairperson who chooses the speakers. Other meetings include an "open sharing" component, during which anyone attending has the opportunity to share. There is usually no direct feedback during the "share"; thus only one person ever speaks at any given time during this portion of the meeting. These types of meetings are sometimes described as discussion meetings. Some groups choose to host a single speaker (such meetings are usually denoted "speaker meetings") to share for the majority of the meeting time.

Other meeting formats include round-robin (sharing goes around in a circle), tag meeting (each speaker picks the next person to share), and stick meetings (each member draws a stick with a topic to share on). Some meetings focus on reading, writing, and/or sharing about one of the Twelve Steps or some other portion of NA literature. Some meetings are "common needs" (also known as special-interest) meetings, supporting a particular group of people based on gender, sexual identity, age, language, or another characteristic. These meetings are not exclusionary, as any addict is welcome at any NA meeting. NA communities will often make an effort to have a separate meeting run at the same time for members who do not identify with the common-needs meeting.

During the meeting, some groups allot time for NA-related announcements and many meetings set aside time to recognize clean-time "anniversaries" or "birthdays". Individuals are sometimes allowed to announce their clean time to the group. Key tags and medallions, which denote various amounts of clean time, are distributed to those who have achieved various milestones. In some areas, the addict who is celebrating a "clean-time anniversary" will be able to have support group members read the readings for the meeting and he or she will have a speaker carry the NA message. Then the addict celebrating will have their sponsor or a friend or family member give them a medallion at which time the friend will share some of the celebrating addict's achievements during the last year or from during the entire course of their recovery. Then the addict celebrating can share their experience, strength, and hope (ESH) with the group on how they did it.

NA states in the fifth tradition that "each group has but one primary purpose – to carry the message to the addict who still suffers." Therefore, the newcomer is considered to be the most important person in any meeting. Our message is hope and the promise of freedom. The NA message, as quoted in the Basic Text, states, "an addict, any addict, can stop using drugs, lose the desire to use, and find a new way to live" (Basic Text p. 68). "NA offers one promise: freedom from active addiction" (Basic Text p. 106). According to the Narcotics Anonymous Basic Text, the "Twelve Steps" are the source of this hope and freedom when worked to the best of one's ability.

== Service ==
NA literature suggests that service work is an essential part of a program of recovery. Service is "doing the right thing for the right reason", and is the best example of "goodwill", which is the basis for the freedom only from active addiction by the NA program. Service work is usually chairing a meeting, but may be as simple as cleaning up after the meeting, putting away chairs, or answering a phone. Additionally, there are basic, formalized service positions at the group level to help the group perform its function, such as treasurer, secretary, and Group Service Representative (GSR), who represents the group in the larger service structure.

The NA service structure operates at the area, regional, and world levels. These levels of service exist to serve the groups and are directly responsible to those groups; they do not govern. World services are accountable to its member regions, who are in turn responsible to member areas. Area service committees directly support member groups and often put on special events, such as dances and picnics. Area service committees also provide special subcommittees to serve the needs of members who may be confined in jails and institutions, and will also provide a public interface to the fellowship.

== Literature ==
- The Basic Text called Narcotics Anonymous is divided into two books. Book one discusses the basics of the NA program and the twelve steps and traditions. Book two is composed of many personal stories.
- It Works: How and Why offers detailed discussion of the twelve steps and traditions. and is often called the "green and gold" after its cover.
- The Step Working Guides is a workbook with questions on each step and is often called the "Flat Book".
- Just For Today is a book of daily meditations with quotes from the Basic Text and other NA-approved literature including the "Information Pamphlets".
- Sponsorship is an in-depth discussion of the role of sponsorship in NA, including the personal experiences of members.
- Miracles Happen describes the early years of the NA organization. This book contains many photographs of early literature and meeting places.
- Living Clean: The Journey Continues was approved by the World Service Conference in May 2012. It contains members' experiences of staying clean and in recovery as they go through challenges in life such as illness, death, parenthood, spiritual paths, and employment.
- Guiding Principles; The Spirit of Our Traditions was approved by the World Service Conference in May 2016. The book explores the principles found in the 12 Traditions of NA and is a resource for members of NA to learn what the essence of the Traditions are, as well as understanding their application for NA groups, members, and service committees.

NA has also produced dozens of "Informational Pamphlets", or "IPs", of varying length that cover a wide range of recovery-related topics, including questionnaires for those who think they may have a drug addiction and information for those addicts trying to stay clean while still inside hospitals or institutions.

== Spirituality ==
NA calls itself a spiritual program of recovery from the disease of addiction. The NA program places importance on developing a working relationship with a "higher power". The literature suggests that members formulate their own personal understanding of a higher power. The only suggested guidelines are that this power is "loving, caring, and greater than one's self and more powerful than the disease of addiction".

Members are given absolute freedom in coming to an understanding of a higher power that works for them. Individuals from various spiritual and religious backgrounds, as well as many atheists and agnostics, have developed a relationship with their own higher power. NA also makes frequent use of the word "God" and some members who have difficulty with this term substitute "higher power" or read it as an acronym for "Good Orderly Direction". Narcotics Anonymous is a spiritual, not religious program.

The twelve steps of the NA program are based upon spiritual principles, three of which are honesty, open-mindedness, and willingness, embodied in the first three steps. These three are hardly exhaustive. The Basic Text of NA says, in Chapter Four, about all twelve steps, "These are the principles which made our recovery possible". According to NA members these principles, when followed to the best of one's ability, allow for a new way of life.

NA meetings usually close with a circle of the participants, a group hug, and a prayer of some sort. Prayers used to close meetings today include the "we" version of the "Serenity Prayer" ("God, Grant us the serenity to accept the things we cannot change, the courage to change the things we can, and the wisdom to know the difference."); the Third Step Prayer ("Take my will and my life. Guide me in my recovery. Show me how to live.") or the "Gratitude Prayer" ("That no addict seeking recovery need ever die. ... My Gratitude speaks when I care and when I share with others the NA way.")

== Sponsorship ==
One addict helping another is an essential part of the NA program. It is therefore highly recommended that NA members find a sponsor. A sponsor is a member of NA who helps another member of the fellowship by sharing their experience, strength, and hope in recovery and serves as a guide through the Twelve Steps. In doing so, NA members often choose a sponsor with experience in applying the NA's Twelve Steps.

To feel most comfortable, many NA members have sponsors of the same sex although members are free to choose any other member as a sponsor. It is also suggested that one should find a sponsor who has worked all 12 steps of Narcotics Anonymous.

== Anonymity ==
"Anonymity is the spiritual foundation of all our traditions, ever reminding us to place principles before personalities." (12th Tradition, Basic Text)

Many NA members identify themselves in meetings by their first name only. The spirit of anonymity is about placing "principles before personalities" and recognizing that no individual addict is superior to another and that individual addicts do not recover without the fellowship or its spiritual principles.

The Eleventh Tradition states that NA members "need always maintain personal anonymity at the level of press, radio, and films".

== History ==
NA sprang from the Alcoholics Anonymous Program of the mid-1930s, and was founded by Jimmy Kinnon. Meetings first emerged in Los Angeles in the early 1950s. The NA program, officially founded in 1953, started as a small US-based movement that has grown into the world's largest 12 step recovery program for drug addiction.

=== Predecessors ===
Alcoholics Anonymous was the first 12-step program, and through it many with drug and drinking problems found sobriety. The Fourth Tradition gives each AA group the autonomy to include or exclude non-alcoholic addicts from "closed" meetings – where only those with an expressed desire to quit drinking may attend. At "open" AA meetings, non-alcoholics are welcome.

In 1944, AA's co-founder Bill Wilson discussed a separate fellowship for drug addicts. In 1947, NARCO (also called Addicts Anonymous) met weekly at the U.S. Public Health Service's treatment center (Federal Medical Center, Lexington) inside the Lexington, Kentucky federal prison for 20 years. In 1948, a NARCO member started a short-lived fellowship also called "Narcotics Anonymous" in the New York Prison System in New York City, New York. This version of NA did not follow the 12 Traditions of NA, which resulted in problems for the fellowship and ultimately the end of that NA in the late 1940s. Jimmy K., who is credited with starting the NA as we know it today, did contact Rae Perez, a leading member of this NA fellowship. Because that fellowship did not want to follow the 12 traditions written by AA, the two NA fellowships never united.

=== Early history of NA ===
On August 17, 1953, Narcotics Anonymous was founded by Jimmy Kinnon and others. Differing from its predecessors, NA formed a fellowship of mutually supporting groups. Founding members, most of whom were from AA, debated and established the 12 Traditions of the NA fellowship. On September 14, 1953, AA authorized NA the use of AA's 12 steps and traditions on the condition that they stop using the AA name, causing the organization to call itself Narcotics Anonymous.

In 1954, the first NA publication was printed, called the "Little Brown Book". It contained the 12 steps and early drafts of several pieces that would later be included in subsequent literature.

The initial group had difficulty finding places that would allow them to meet and often had to meet in people's homes. The first meetings of Narcotics Anonymous were held in the basements of churches for the members' protection because at that time a law prohibiting convicted felons from congregating was still being upheld and churches offered their basements as a sanctuary. Addicts would have to cruise around meeting places and check for surveillance, to make sure meetings would not be busted by police. It was many years before NA became recognized as a beneficial organization, although some early press accounts were very positive.

In addition, many NA groups were not following the 12 traditions very closely (which were quite new at the time). These groups were at times accepting money from outside entities, conflating AA with NA, or even adding religious elements to the meetings. For a variety of reasons, meetings began to decline in the late 1950s, and there was a four-month period in 1959 when there were no meetings held anywhere at all. Spurred into action by this, Kinnon and others dedicated themselves to restarting NA, promising to hold to the traditions more closely.

=== Resurgence ===
In late 1959, meetings began to form again and grow. The NA White Booklet was written in 1962 and became the heart of NA meetings and the basis for all subsequent NA literature. NA was called a "hip pocket program" because the entire literature could fit into a person's hip pocket. This booklet was republished in 1966 as the NA White Book and included the personal stories of many addicts.

The first NA phone line started in 1960, and the first "H&I" group was formed in 1963 (H&I stands for Hospitals and Institutions, a sub-committee of Narcotics Anonymous that carries the message into hospitals and institutions where people cannot get to an outside meeting). That year a "Parent Service Board" (later renamed the World Service Board) was formed to ensure that NA stayed healthy and followed closely to the traditions. Confusingly, in 1962, the Salvation Army started a group also called "Narcotics Anonymous" that followed a different "13-step" program, but this program soon died out. The NA program grew slowly in the 1960s. Members of the program learned what was effective and what was not. Relapse rates declined over time and friction between NA groups began to decrease.

The 1970s was a period of rapid growth in NA's history. In 1970, there were only 20 regular, weekly meetings, all of them in the United States. Within two years there were 70, including meetings in Germany and Bermuda. By 1976, there were 200 regular meetings, including 83 in California alone, and in the early 1980s in Australia (August 1981), Brazil, Canada, Colombia, India, the Republic of Ireland, Japan, New Zealand, and the United Kingdom. In 1980, the first London meeting opened in Millman Street, Chelsea, with around six members and a second followed months later. By 1981, there were 1,100 different meetings all over the world and in 1983 Mary Bolton founded Narcotics Anonymous in Ireland. A World Service Office was officially opened in 1977. In 1971, the first NA World Conference was held, and others have followed annually.

=== The development of NA literature ===
From the beginnings of NA, the need for official NA literature was evident. Unfortunately, the process of creating and approving official NA literature has seen some of the most contentious periods of debate within the fellowship. Although the Yellow Booklet, Little White Booklet, and Little White Book were used in the 1960s and 1970s, many people desired to have a more detailed book on recovery, paralleling the "Big Book" of Alcoholics Anonymous. Some meetings offered AA literature at meetings, while others considered writing their own books on recovery. One group even planned to print a bootlegged version of AA's Big Book with every instance of the word "alcohol" replaced with "drugs". The need for a unified text approved by the fellowship's "group conscience" was recognized, and in October 1979 the first NA World Literature Conference was held in Wichita, Kansas.

While previous literature had been written by just a few addicts (primarily by Jimmy Kinnon), the NA Basic Text was written as a massive collaboration between hundreds of people. There were a total of seven World Literature Conferences within three years, all of them open to any addict who wished to help. It was decided that the book would use the Little White Book as its outline, filling in and expanding on the subjects discussed in that text.

In November 1981, a finalized version was distributed to all of NA for approval, and the text was approved with a 2/3 majority required for passage. After passage, however, the publication was held up due to a spirited disagreement between the World Service Office and the members who wrote the book regarding a few key sentences which described the nature of the World Service Organization and other NA service entities. The book was printed in 1983 with the passages removed. A second edition that restored the passages quickly followed at the demand of the fellowship. A hasty vote which required Regional Service Representatives to respond within 60 days (even though most regions only met every 90 days) making it impossible to actually poll the NA Groups and membership again removed the sentences in a third edition.

Professional editors and writers were hired in 1986 to improve the Basic Text so that it was more consistent in tone and style. The resultant 4th edition, released in 1987, was improperly reviewed and had many problems, including 30 lines that were missing and text that was inconsistent with other NA literature. A 5th edition was released in 1988, purportedly correcting those problems.

In 2004, the WSC initiated a project to revise the Basic Text. This new edition would remove some of the personal stories from the 5th edition, and supplement the remainder of the original stories with more diverse personal stories from around the world. The first 10 chapters were to remain the same. Also, the preface would remain the same, as well as the "Symbol" page. There is a new preface but the original preface will be called "preface to the 1st edition". There were some other changes to the structure of the book, including the layout and flow of the book, while keeping the original message clear and unchanged. The task of choosing these stories was handed down from the World Service Office to regional meetings, to Area Service Committee meetings, and then to the individual home group meetings, where each member had a chance to review the new text.

When the Approval Draft came out on September 1, 2006, 7,500 copies were distributed (4,493 copies were mailed and 3,009 copies were electronic copies downloaded by members). The approximate number of input received was 350 pieces, of which 60 percent came from individuals, 17 percent came from groups, and 23 percent came from committees. More than 20 percent (161) of the personal stories submitted came from outside of the United States. Submissions were received from the following countries (although later on more personal stories were submitted and the additional statistics are unknown):

- Argentina
- Australia
- Bangladesh
- Belgium
- Brazil
- Canada
- Colombia
- Egypt
- France
- Germany
- Greece
- India
- Iran
- Ireland
- Israel
- Italy
- Japan
- Mexico
- Nepal
- Netherlands
- New Zealand
- Nicaragua
- Norway
- Portugal
- Puerto Rico
- Russia
- Saudi Arabia
- Singapore
- South Africa
- Spain
- Sweden
- Switzerland
- Trinidad
- Turkey
- United Kingdom
- The United States
- Venezuela
- West Indies

The 6th edition of the NA Basic Text was approved with over forty new "personal stories" from around the world. Because of the addition of so many new stories of NA member experiences, it is larger in size than all earlier editions. After the rapid succession of five editions during the 1980s, this was the first new edition in twenty years.

On October 1, 2008, the 5th edition was replaced by the 6th edition in the Narcotics Anonymous World Services inventory at NA.org. Copies of the Basic Text are sold, or given away for free at the group's expense, at NA meetings, and are available in over 30 different languages. Millions have been sold worldwide, and have been useful to many addicts.

=== More recent history ===
The Sixth Edition Basic Text was published in 2008, and there was also a special edition released that same year known as the 25th Anniversary Commemorative (of the First Edition Basic Text) Sixth Edition Basic Text.

In 2003, NA World Services approved a new text entitled Sponsorship. This book endeavors to help people explore the concept of NA sponsorship.

In the more recent months, there has been a motion to revise the pamphlet "In Times of Illness".

A motion for a project to create a new book was put to the World Service Conference in the 2008–2010 conference cycle. The motion was carried by unanimous consent in 2010. over the next two years members of the Narcotics Anonymous fellowship took part in a collective effort to create this new book-length piece of literature. The book was to be titled Living Clean: The Journey Continues. At the 2012 World Service Conference, a motion to approve the final draft of the book was presented to the conference for approval and once again the delegates carried the motion unanimously. Living Clean: The Journey Continues was released to the public in 2012.

Another book, Guiding Principles, was developed during this period.

Most recently in 2022, Narcotics Anonymous published the Spiritual Principal A Day book (often shortened to SPAD). This book consists of a short message about a different spiritual principle for each day of the year. This is similar to another book previously published by NA called Just for Today, containing a message for thought on a recovery related topic for each day of the year.

=== Membership demographics ===
Membership in Narcotics Anonymous is voluntary; no attendance records are kept either for NA's own purposes or for others. Because of this, it is sometimes difficult to provide interested parties with comprehensive information about NA membership. There are, however, some objective measures that can be shared based on data obtained from members attending one of NA world conventions; the diversity of membership, especially ethnic background, seems to be representative of the geographic location of the survey. The following demographic information was revealed in a survey returned by almost half of the 13,000 attendees at the 2003 NA World Convention held in San Diego, California: • Gender: 55% male, 45% female. • Age: 3% 20 years old and under, 12% 21–30 years old, 31% 31–40 years old, 40% 41–50 years old, 13% over age 51, and 1% did not answer. • Ethnicity: 51% Caucasian, 24% African-American, 14% Hispanic, and 11% other. • Employment status: 72% employed full-time, 9% employed part-time, 7% unemployed, 3% retired, 3% homemakers, 5% students, and 1% did not answer. • Continuous abstinence/recovery: The 2015 Membership Survey showed the range from less than one year up to 54 years, with a mean average of 8.32 years. The 2015 Membership Survey of 22,803 members is available on NA.org, under the "For the Public" tab.

=== Rate of growth ===
Because no attendance records are kept, it is impossible to estimate what percentages of those who come to Narcotics Anonymous remain active in NA over time. The only sure indicator of the program's ability to attract members is the rapid growth in the number of registered Narcotics Anonymous meetings in recent decades and the rapid spread of Narcotics Anonymous outside North America.

- In 1978, there were fewer than 200 registered groups in three countries.
- In 1983, more than a dozen countries had 2,966 meetings.
- In 1993, 60 countries had over 13,000 groups holding over 19,000 meetings.
- In 2002, 108 countries had 20,000 groups holding over 30,000 meetings.
- In 2005, 116 countries had over 21,500 groups holding over 33,500 weekly meetings.
- In 2007, over 25,065 groups were holding over 43,900 weekly meetings in 127 countries.
- In 2012, there were over 62,700 meetings worldwide in over 142 countries.
- In 2018, there were more than 70,000 weekly meetings in 144 countries.

== Organizational structure ==
Members meet at NA Groups; Representatives of which participate in Area Service Committees (ASC); Several Area Service Committees form a Regional Service Committee (RSC) and the Regional Delegates (RD) make up NA World Service Committee. The foundation for this structure is the Twelve Traditions of NA and the 12 Concepts for NA Service.

=== NA Groups ===
Narcotics Anonymous is fundamentally made up of NA Groups. An NA Group is a number of NA members who meet regularly; usually at the same time and place each week. Some Groups have more frequent meetings but are considered to be part of a single Group. Groups have one primary purpose, to carry the message to the addict who still suffers. Groups are largely independent of one another and members of NA are encouraged to choose a "homegroup" to belong to, a group they attend regularly and where they will be missed if they are absent. Each Group elects any number of leaders, or "trusted servants", to serve the needs of the Group. These may include a Group Secretary, a Group Treasurer, a Group Chairperson, a Group Service Representative (GSR), and an alternate GSR. This election process is carried out by the Group Conscience which is a business meeting made up of the members of the Group who strive for consensus-based decisions. With each group being autonomous, without affecting NA as a whole, the responsibilities of trusted servants vary from meeting to meeting. These responsibilities or "group policies" are contrived through the group's business meeting by inviting a Higher Power to guide each recovering person's decision, also known as a group conscience. An example of one specific trusted servant's responsibilities are, "The secretary is responsible for opening the meeting, choosing someone to chair the meeting, making sure coffee gets made, etc. He or she also arranges for purchasing supplies and keeping group records. The treasurer keeps financial records and pays the group's bills. The GSR attends the Area Service Committee meetings and represents the group to the ASC. The alternate GSR assists the GSR and prepares to replace the GSR when need be."

=== Area service committees ===
An ASC is made up of all the participating NA Groups in a given area. The Group Service Representatives (GSRs) and alternate GSRs from each Group in an Area meet regularly together for a business meeting where issues are raised and discussed to better meet the needs of the groups in the Area. Each ASC elects its own officers: the chairperson, vice-chairperson, secretary, treasurer, and regional committee members (RCMs). Frequently an ASC will have various subcommittees (such as a but not limited to Hospitals and Institutions (H&I), Public Information (PI), Activities, Website, Outreach, Policy, Literature, Literature Review, Newsletter, Recovery By Mail and Convention) which are led by subcommittee leaders that are elected by the entire ASC. In some regions, several ASCs will be grouped into a Metropolitan Service Committee at the sub-regional level; this is typical in especially large cities, like Los Angeles, that contain multiple ASCs.

=== Regional service committees ===
An RSC is composed of the regional committee members (RCMs) of all the participating ASCs in a region. It is similar in organization to an ASC but is further removed from the day-to-day activities of individual home groups. Many of the issues dealt with by RSCs are the same ones that will come before the World Service Conference, with the RSC being the best way for local groups to help craft policies that will affect NA as a whole. In some cases, only the RCMs in a region will meet to vote on issues; in other situations, all GSRs in a region will be invited to attend an RSC meeting. The RSC elects a delegate to attend the World Service Conference.

=== Zonal Forums ===
The Zonal Forums are service-oriented organizational structures designed to improve communication between RSCs. They are not decision-making entities.

Some Zonal Forums actively participate in "Fellowship Development" to help NA fellowships grow in new countries and geographic areas where NA is still forming. Zonal Forums help NA groups, areas, or regions to work together to translate literature, inform the local community about NA and create new service committees. This is achieved through annual or biannual Zonal Forum meetings together with development visits to NA groups and members in other countries. Experienced NA members hold workshops, and meetings and present material to help the newer communities.

Zonal forums also provide an important opportunity for World Services and the World Board to interact with newer and growing NA communities to better understand their needs and challenges. Zonal forums are an important part of the growth of NA in some of the most populous and remote parts of the world. Eastern Europe, central and eastern Asia, and Latin America NA communities have grown significantly through the work of Zonal Forums.

Some Zonal Forums are a service-oriented sharing session that provides the means by which NA communities in their zone can communicate, cooperate, and grow with one another. Although not a part of NA's formal decision-making system, Zonal Forums interact with World Services in many ways. Each Zonal Forum provides a biannual report on the floor of the World Service Conference and, when requested by the conference, may also answer specific questions or address the body. To improve communications, the Zonal Forums are provided with conference participant mailings and send each Zonal Forum meeting record to World Services. To more effectively serve the fellowship, World Services and the Zonal Forums maintain an ongoing partnership to plan and conduct the Worldwide Workshop system.

=== NA World Service Conference ===
The NA World Service Conference (WSC) is a triennial service meeting made up of the delegates of the seated Regions and Zones of the world and the members of the NA World Board. This service conference has the executive right to make decisions for the entire NA Fellowship. This includes electing members to serve on the World Board, approving all new NA Literature, service material, and making policy decisions that affect the fellowship including the organizational structure. This responsibility has been executed as recently as the late 1990s when the World Service Conference voted to re-structure the NA Service structure including the removal of the Board of Trustees, Board of Directors, and several other World Service level committees (Public Information, Hospitals & Institutions, Literature, and Translations) replacing them with a single board elected by the conference.

=== NA World Service Office ===
The WSC through the World Board is responsible for the NA World Service Office located in the Chatsworth, a neighborhood of Los Angeles, California, United States. This office handles the production of all approved literature, provides resources for projects approved by the WSC, and also provides limited services to the fellowship as a whole. The office also administers the legal responsibilities of the fellowship concerning copyrights, intellectual property, and accounting. The office employs many people who carry out these functions.

=== Finances ===
Narcotics Anonymous members are not required to pay any dues or fees. NA is committed to being fully self-supporting, declining any outside contributions. Group expenses are covered entirely by voluntary contributions from its members. Groups meet costs such as meeting room rental, tea and coffee, and any literature that the group provides for free from these contributions, after which surplus funds are passed to the service structure. Group often provide some literature items such as IPs (Double sided single sheet pamphlets) and keytags/chips celebrating clean time. Area Service Committees are typically funded from Group contributions plus money raised by events such as dances and recovery events attended by members. In some countries Area committees also supply literature to the Groups. Areas pass funds on to the Regions, which can also receive contributions from Groups and also raise money through conventions attended by hundreds to thousands and tens of thousands of members. Regions also sometimes run Regional Service Offices which buy literature from the World Service Office and its branch offices for sale to Areas and Groups. Because Regional Service Offices can purchase in bulk and sell at list price sometimes this surplus exceeds the running costs of the office. Regions then pass funds to Zonal Forums and also the World Service Conference via the World Service Office according to the decision of the Region.

At the World Service level of Narcotics Anonymous expenses are met partially by the voluntary donations via the service structure and also through the sale of recovery literature. NA does not accept donations from non-members, organizations, or governments. NA recovery literature is produced by the NA World Service Office (NAWS) located in California, US. Typically NA groups will purchase literature using group funds from local (area or regional) service offices, or direct from NAWS.

Some literature is provided to new members for free (such as the "Information Pamphlets") while other, typically book-length pieces, are sold at the purchase cost to the group. Literature is also purchased from Group contributions and made available to new members. NAWS receives 87% (2004/5) of its income from the sale of literature. Other expenses include group refreshments, meeting-place rent, etc. Financial information is publicly available on the NA website. The 2007 World Convention of NA ran at a net financial loss of $596,000.

== Effectiveness ==
The first sophisticated outcome studies of NA were conducted in the early 1990s in London, England. The first study found a roughly linear relationship between the length of membership and abstinence with reduced anxiety and increased self-esteem. While the NA sample had higher anxiety than the non-addicted comparison groups, these levels were equivalent for those with three or more years of membership, which is consistent with the hypothesis that NA membership reduces anxiety as well as substance use. This study also, contrary to the authors' expectations, found that spiritual beliefs and disease concept beliefs were not prerequisites for attendance of NA and even if these beliefs were adopted they were not found to cause external attributions for previous drug use or possible future lapse events.

A study of the early experience of new NA members in Victoria Australia in 1995 interviewed 91 members initially and 62 (68%) after 12 months and found that higher self-help participation as measured by service role involvement, step work, and stable meeting attendance, in the 12 months before the follow-up was associated with a four-fold reduction in levels of hazardous drug and alcohol use, less illicit income and sickness benefits and higher emotional support at reinterview.

One approach is to provide professional 12-step facilitation (TSF) either in an individual or group setting. TSF sessions are designed to introduce the patient to 12-step concepts and facilitate the entry of the patient into community-based 12-step programs. It must be emphasized that TSF is not NA, it is an implementation of 12-step program elements by a professional counsellor. NA recommends 12 step work with another member who has worked the steps.

One study, sponsored by NIDA, randomly assigned people using cocaine into four groups: individual drug counseling plus group drug counseling (GDC), cognitive therapy plus GDC, supportive expressive therapy plus GDC, or GDC alone. Individual drug counseling was based on the 12-step philosophy. Group drug counseling was designed to educate patients about the stages of recovery from addiction, to strongly encourage participation in 12-step programs, and to provide a supportive group atmosphere for initiating abstinence and an alternative lifestyle. Nearly 500 patients participated in the study.

The results suggested that all four treatment conditions resulted in similar reductions in cocaine use with the IDC + GDC group (TSF) more effective than the other three groups. One issue with this study is that there was significant attrition of patients, with significantly larger numbers of dropouts from the TSF groups than from the others.

=== Fiorentine 1999 ===
Fiorentine 1999 was a 24-month longitudinal study measuring the effectiveness of Alcoholics Anonymous and NA. Like other longitudinal studies, it shows a strong correlation between 12-step attendance and being both clean from drugs and sober from alcohol: People who went to 12-step meetings in the study had about a 75% success rate.

In more detail, at the 24-month follow up, 77.7% of people who went to one or more meetings a week self-reported being clean; urinalysis was very close to that figure, showing some 76.4% of the regular attendees being clean. For participants who did not regularly go to meetings, the self-reported figure for being abstinent was 56% and the drug test showed 57.9% being clean. The self-reported figures for excessive alcohol use were similar: 74.8% of regular 12-step attenders self-reported being completely sober, but only 40% of people who did not go to 12-step meetings claimed to be sober. Urinalysis showed 96.6% of people regularly going to meetings as sober, in contrast to the 88.9% of people who did not go to meetings once a week or more whose urine sample was alcohol-free.

The report then sees if 12-step meetings have a specific effect (in other words, if there is causation or merely correlation) by using statistical analysis to compare participants self-reported level of motivation, 12-step attendance, and successfully getting clean and sober. The result of this observation was that "Weekly or more frequent 12-step participants are 1.59 times more likely than less-than-weekly participants to maintain abstinence after controlling for the differences in recovery motivation measured by the scale."

== Controversies ==
The NA program attempts to avoid controversy through its application of the 12 traditions, which specify that "Narcotics Anonymous has no opinion on outside issues; hence the NA name ought never be drawn into public controversy." Even so, the Basic Text points out that there are still "communication problems, differences of opinion, internal controversies, and troubles with individuals and groups outside the Fellowship", and various controversies of this type have disturbed NA throughout its history.

=== Internal controversies ===
Early in the history of NA, different groups emphasized different aspects of recovery. In particular, the make-up and process of creating an NA text was a contentious period for the fellowship. Different factions supported different versions of the Basic Text, and in the ensuing power struggle there were many accusations made and resentments cultivated. The basis of the dispute was whether the service committees were described as a part of NA, or as a separate entity, basically a tool of the NA groups with no decision-making power; instead being charged with collecting the decisions of the NA groups themselves. This dispute reached its nadir when the NA World Service Office sued an NA member in an attempt to prevent him from distributing free versions of the Basic Text. Today there are some NA groups who use a self-produced version of the Basic Text that has come to be known as the Baby Blue which is basically the Third Edition, Revised Basic Text (except that it contains originally approved essays on the Traditions). Some Traditionalist groups use the Second Edition or Approval Draft (both of which contain the original Traditions and are nearly identical to each other).

=== Approaches of other twelve-step groups ===
NA is unusual but not unique in its focus on the symptom/substance not being the core problem, but rather the disease of addiction, as is stated in the NA Step 1. In NA, it does not matter what substance you used, and alcohol is seen as a drug. 12-step groups differ in their approach to the treatment of addiction and recovery. Alcoholics Anonymous "is a program for alcoholics who seek freedom from alcohol" but does refer to "some AA members who have misused drugs...in such a manner as to become a threat to the achievement and maintenance of sobriety" and mentions that drugs can "create a dependence just as devastating as dependence on alcohol". Cocaine Anonymous originally formed to address the special needs of cocaine addicts, but "is not a drug specific fellowship" and "welcomes anyone with a drug or alcohol problem and offers a solution". CA's program involves abstaining from cocaine "and all other mind-altering substances", thus taking the same stance as NA pertaining to abstinence from all drugs, including alcohol and marijuana. Methadone Anonymous is similar to NA, but considers the use of methadone to be a tool of recovery and not a drug. NA has no opinion on these groups, as these are outside issues and the traditions suggest against taking a definitive stand on outside issues.

== See also ==
- Nar-Anon, a separate organization for family members and friends of Narcotics Anonymous members
