= Twelve Steps and Twelve Traditions =

History of a book at the heart of the Alcoholics Anonymous programme since 1953

- First edition
- Author: Bill W. and Tom Powers
- Language: English
- Subject: Alcoholism, Alcoholics Anonymous, Twelve Steps, Twelve Traditions
- Published: 1953 Alcoholics Anonymous World Services, Inc.
- Publication place: United States
- Media type: Print (hardback, paperback and online)

Twelve Steps and Twelve Traditions is a 1953 book which explains the 24 basic principles of Alcoholics Anonymous and their application. The book dedicates a chapter to each step and each tradition, providing a detailed interpretation of these principles for personal recovery and the organization of the group. Bill W. began work on this project in early 1952. By 1957, 50,000 copies were in circulation.

== Use in AA meetings ==
The book is commonly used at AA meetings and other 12-step programs. A step or tradition is chosen to read and discuss as a prompt for a topic of discussion or sharing at the meeting.
