= Alcohol abuse =

Substance abuse of alcoholic beverages

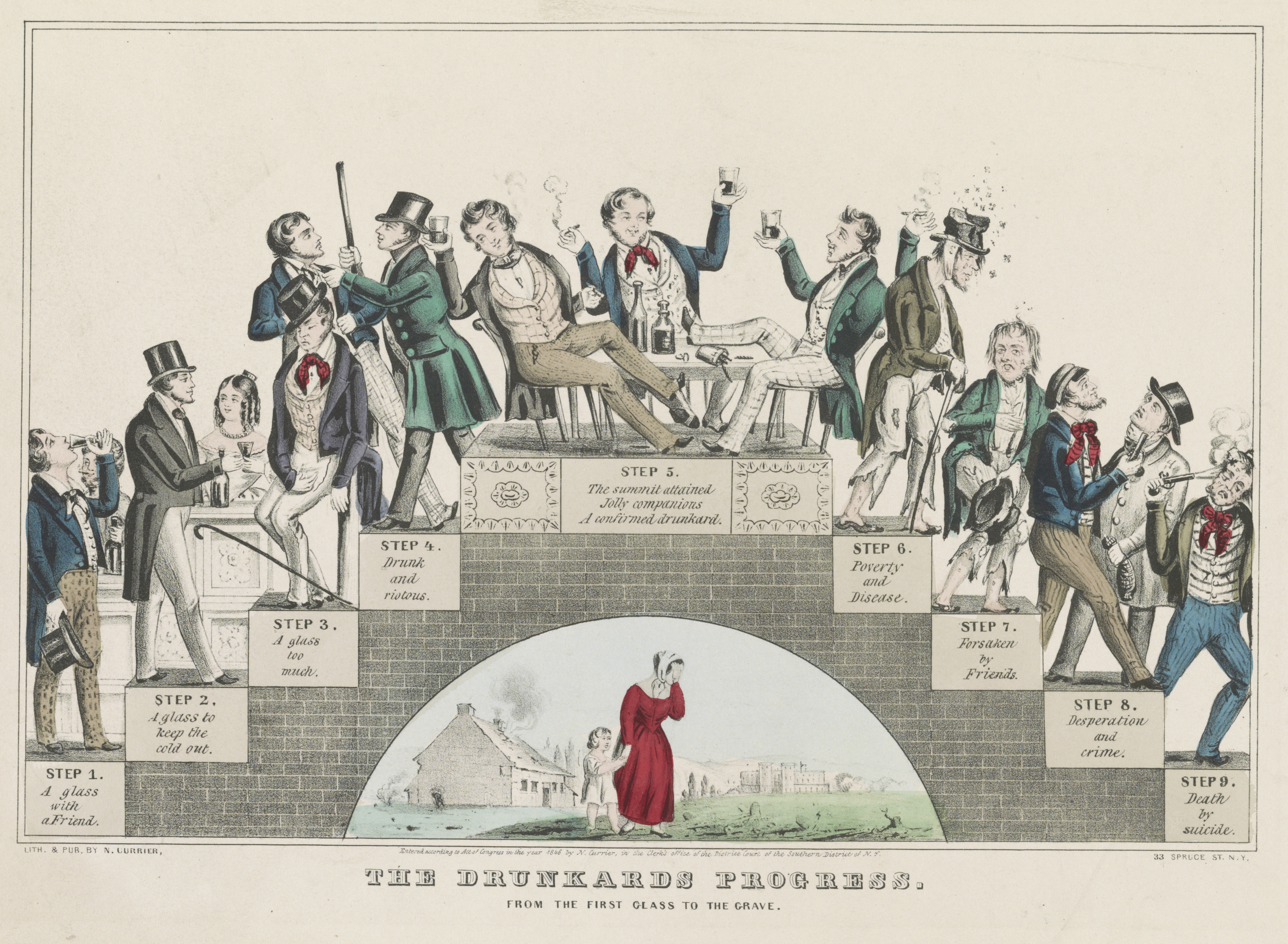
- "The Drunkard's Progress", an 1846 lithograph depicting a man's journey through alcoholism
- Specialty: Psychiatry
- Symptoms: Relationship difficulties, legal problems, problems at work or school, insomnia, irritability, chronic fatigue.
- Complications: Alcoholic liver disease, Pancreatitis (acute or chronic), cancer
- Diagnostic method: Clinical history, DSM-5 criteria
- Treatment: Contingency management, motivational interviewing, Alcoholics Anonymous or SMART Recovery meeting attendance

The 2010 ISCD study "Drug Harms in the UK: a multi-criteria decision analysis" found that alcohol scored highest overall and in Economic cost, Injury, Family adversities, Environmental damage, and Community harm.

Alcohol abuse encompasses a spectrum of alcohol-related substance abuse. This spectrum can range from being mild, moderate, or severe. This can look like consumption of more than 2 drinks per day on average for men, or more than 1 drink per day on average for women, to binge drinking.

Alcohol abuse was a psychiatric diagnosis in the DSM-IV, but it has been merged with alcohol dependence in the DSM-5 into alcohol use disorder.

Alcohol use disorder, also known as AUD, shares similar conditions that some people refer to as alcohol abuse, alcohol dependence, alcohol addiction, and the most used term, alcoholism.

Globally, excessive alcohol consumption is the seventh leading risk factor for both death and the burden of disease and injury, representing 5.1% of the total global burden of disease and injury, measured in disability-adjusted life years (DALYs). After tobacco, alcohol accounts for a higher burden of disease than any other drug. Alcohol use is a major cause of preventable liver disease worldwide, and alcoholic liver disease is the main alcohol-related chronic medical illness. Millions of people of all ages, from adolescents to the elderly, engage in unhealthy drinking. In the United States, excessive alcohol use costs more than $249 billion annually. There are many factors that play a role in causing someone to have an alcohol use disorder: genetic vulnerabilities, neurobiological precursors, psychiatric conditions, trauma, social influence, environmental factors, and even parental drinking habits. Data shows that those that began drinking at an earlier stage in life were more likely to report experiencing AUD than those that began later. For example, those who began at age 15 are more likely to report suffering from this disorder than those that waited until age 26 and older. The risk of females reporting this is higher than that of males.

== Definitions ==
Risky drinking (also called hazardous drinking) is defined by drinking above the recommended limits:

- greater than 14 standard drinks units per week or greater than 4 standard drinks on a single occasion in men
- greater than 7 standard drinks units per week or greater than 3 standard drinks on a single occasion in women
- any drinking in pregnant women or persons < 21 years old

Binge drinking is a pattern of alcohol consumption that brings blood alcohol concentration ≥ 0.08%, usually corresponding to:

- ≥ 5 standard drinks on a single occasion in men
- ≥ 4 standard drinks on a single occasion in women

In the DSM-IV, alcohol abuse and alcohol dependence were defined as distinct disorders from 1994 to 2013. The DSM-5 combined those two disorders into alcohol use disorder with mild, moderate, and severe sub-classifications of severity. The term "alcoholism" is no longer a diagnosis in medical care.

Alcohol misuse is a term used by United States Preventive Services Task Force to describe a spectrum of drinking behaviors that encompass risky drinking, alcohol abuse, and alcohol dependence (similar meaning to alcohol use disorder but not a term used in DSM).

== Signs and symptoms ==
Specific diagnostic criteria for Alcohol Use Disorder, according to the DSM-5 includes: alcohol taken in excessive amounts over a long duration of time, a recurring desire/craving for alcohol, trouble stopping/resisting alcohol, recurrent alcohol use resulting in failure to adhere to social, occupational and personal obligations, continued alcohol use after continual social and interpersonal complications, physically hazardous alcohol use, continued alcohol use knowing that it causes persistent physical and cognitive problems, high alcohol tolerance and withdrawal syndrome for alcohol.

Individuals with an alcohol use disorder will often complain of difficulty with interpersonal relationships, problems at work or school, and legal problems. Additionally, people may complain of irritability and insomnia. Alcohol use disorder is also an important cause of chronic fatigue. Signs of alcohol abuse are related to alcohol's effects on organ systems. However, while these findings are often present, they are not necessary to make a diagnosis of alcohol abuse. Alcohol use disorder causes acute central nervous system depression which leads to inebriation, euphoria, impulsivity, sedation and poor judgment. Chronic alcohol use may lead to dependence, reckless behavior, anxiety, irritability, and insomnia.

Alcohol is hepatotoxic and chronic use leads to elevated liver enzyme levels in the bloodstream (classically the aspartate aminotransferase level is at least twice as high as the alanine transaminase level), cirrhosis, and liver failure. Cirrhosis leads to an inability to process hormones and toxins and increased estrogen levels. The skin of a patient with alcoholic cirrhosis can feature spider angiomas, palmar erythema, and — in acute liver failure — jaundice and ascites. The derangements of the endocrine system may lead to the enlargement of the male breasts. The inability to process toxic metabolites such as ammonia in alcoholic cirrhosis may lead to hepatic encephalopathy.

Alcohol is also an established carcinogen and its excessive use causes an increased risk of various cancers, such as breast cancer and head and neck cancer. Using alcohol, especially together with tobacco, is a major risk factor for head and neck cancer. 72% of head and neck cancer cases are caused by using both alcohol and tobacco. This rises to 89% when looking specifically at laryngeal cancer.

Chronic alcohol use is also associated with malnutrition, Wernicke-Korsakoff syndrome, alcoholic cardiomyopathy, hypertension, stroke, arrhythmias, pancreatitis, depression, and dementia. Alcohol is also an established carcinogen with chronic use associated with increased risk of cancer.

Alcohol use disorder can result in brain damage which causes impairments in executive functioning such as impairments to working memory and visuospatial function. Alcohol abuse is also associated with incidence of personality disorders, affective disorders, and emotional dysregulation. Binge drinking is associated with individuals reporting fair to poor health compared to non-binge drinking individuals and which may progressively worsen over time. Alcohol also causes impairment in critical thinking, ability to handle stress, and attention. Alcoholism can cause significant impairment in social skills, due to the neurotoxic effects of alcohol on the brain, especially the prefrontal cortex area of the brain. The prefrontal cortex is responsible for cognitive functions such as working memory, impulse control, and decision making. This region of the brain is vulnerable to chronic alcohol-induced oxidative DNA damage. The social skills that can be impaired by alcohol abuse include impairments in perceiving facial emotions, difficulty with perceiving vocal emotions, theory of mind deficits, and ability to understand humor. Adolescent binge drinkers are most sensitive to damaging neurocognitive functions especially executive functions and memory. People who abuse alcohol are less likely to survive critical illness with a higher risk for having sepsis and increased risk of death during hospitalization. Cessation of alcohol use after dependence is formed may lead to alcohol withdrawal disorder and associated sequela including seizures, insomnia, anxiety, cravings, and delirium tremens.

A smaller volume of consumed alcohol has a greater impact on the older adult than it does on a younger individual. As a result, the American Geriatrics Society recommends for an older adult with no known risk factors less than one drink a day or fewer than two drinks per occasion regardless of gender.

=== Violence ===
Alcohol use disorder has a significant association with suicide and violence. Though many people with Alcohol use disorder may take alcohol to ease their mental suffering, an increased intake of alcohol may serve to further exacerbate psychological issues. This could lead to an increase in suicidal behavior. Alcohol has been implicated in up to 80 percent of suicides and 60 percent of violent acts in Native American communities.

=== Pregnancy ===
A label on alcoholic drinks promoting zero alcohol during pregnancy

Alcohol consumption during pregnancy can pose significant risk facts, as it can harm the developing fetus. The umbilical cord is a direct pathway for the mother's blood alcohol to reach the infant, which can result in miscarriage, and a number of lasting physical and cognitive impairments that can persist throughout the child's life.

Among pregnant women, alcohol use disorder can result in a condition called fetal alcohol syndrome. Fetal alcohol syndrome is a pattern of physical abnormalities and impairments of mental development seen among children of alcoholic mothers. Fetal alcohol syndrome is the most common preventable cause of intellectual disability in the United States. Symptoms include a thin upper lip, short palpebral fissures, smooth philtrum, microcephaly, and other facial dysmorphic features. Surviving infants may also have structural heart defects, heart-lung fistulas, skeletal abnormalities, impaired renal development, short stature, and various cognitive disabilities. Prenatal alcohol exposure is associated with lasting deleterious effects on the endocrine, reproductive, and immune systems. Prenatal alcohol exposure is also associated with increased incidence of disease, cancer, and behavioral issues during adulthood There is no safe quantity or time period for alcohol use during pregnancy and complete abstinence is recommended. Therefore, the biological implications of alcohol abuse are also further reaching than just the physical issues experienced by the consumer.

=== Adolescence ===
Adolescence and the onset of puberty invoke significant physical, social, emotional, and cognitive changes. Increases in risk-taking, impulsivity, reward sensitivity, and social behavior lead to the emergence of alcohol use. New research is shedding light on pre-existing neurobiological markers that are predictive for the initiation of drug and alcohol abuse in adolescents. Alcohol use in adolescence is consistently associated with loss of grey matter volume, aberrant white matter development, and poor white matter integrity. A dose-dependent relationship among adolescent alcohol users is also consistently found for declines in various areas of cognition including executive function, visuospatial learning, impulsivity, working memory, attention, and language abilities. In the US, about 38% of adolescents aged 15–19 drink with 19% being classified as binge drinkers. Adolescents who drink are more likely to display symptoms of conduct disorder including disruptive behavior in school, violating social norms or the rights of others, aggression, learning disabilities, and other social impairments.

Alcohol abuse during adolescence greatly increases the risk of developing an alcohol use disorder in adulthood due to changes to neurocircuitry in the vulnerable adolescent brain. Younger ages of initial consumption among males in recent studies has shown to be associated with increased rates of alcohol abuse within the general population.

== Risk factors ==
The causes of alcohol abuse are complex and multi-faceted. Alcohol abuse is related to economic and biological origins and is associated with adverse health consequences. Additionally, drinking at an early age may cause increased risk for alcohol use disorders. Peer pressure influences individuals to abuse alcohol; however, most of the influence of peers is due to inaccurate perceptions of the risks of alcohol abuse. Easy accessibility, social influence, and positive and negative reinforcement contribute to continued use. Another influencing factor among adolescents and college students are the perceptions of social norms for drinking; people will often drink more to keep up with their peers, as they believe their peers drink more than they actually do. Furthermore, adolescents that perceive more of their friends to consume alcohol are at greater risk for alcohol abuse. They might also expect to drink more given the context (e.g. sporting event, house party, etc.). This perception of norms results in higher alcohol consumption than is normal. Alcohol abuse is also associated with acculturation, because social and cultural factors such as an ethnic group's norms and attitudes can influence alcohol abuse.

=== Mental illness ===
Alcohol consumption is often used as a temporary reprieve from states of severe anxiety, stress, or depression. Among individuals with mood disorders and anxiety disorders, the prevalence of a comorbid alcohol use disorder was significant. One study suggests that the median lifetime prevalence of alcohol use disorder in individuals with major depressive disorder was 30% across 35 US epidemiological studies. Despite this evidence, debate exists among how the relationship exists between alcohol use disorder and mood and anxiety disorders. That is, the role of alcohol use disorder as causal in depression and anxiety and alcohol use disorder as resultant have been established within the literature. Research suggests that more than one of every three individuals with alcohol dependence have experienced episodes of severe depression and/or anxiety. While some individuals with alcohol dependence drink to relieve stress or sadness, not all research supports the claim that depressive and anxiety disorders precede alcoholism. Instead, high amounts of alcohol consumption can cause depressive and anxious symptoms especially during intoxication and withdrawal. This highlights the complex relationship between alcohol misuse and psychological symptoms. More specifically, while some individuals experiencing emotional distress may self-medicate using alcohol, these symptoms often worsen over time due to alcohol dependence.

The numbing effects afforded by alcohol and other substances can serve as a coping strategy for traumatized people who are otherwise unable to dissociate themselves from trauma. This is most often seen in populations with post-traumatic stress disorder (PTSD), where alcohol is used to suppress intrusive thoughts, emotional pain, and hyperarousal symptoms. Research suggests that individuals suffering with PTSD are two to four times more likely to develop comorbid substance use disorder. Also, among current United States military populations, PTSD prevalent post deployment is estimated to be around 15% with about half showing alcohol misuse. Among individuals who already have substance use disorders, the presence of lifetime PTSD was shown to be as high as 50%.

However, the altered or intoxicated state of the abused person prevents the full consciousness necessary for healing. Alcohol misuse over a long period of time can lead to increased emotional dysregulation, impaired decision-making, and increased difficulty taking part in therapeutic interventions. Therefore, treatment strategies for individuals with co-occurring alcohol use disorder and mental health disorders need to address both conditions simultaneously for effective recovery. Treatments that take into account underlying psychological conditions such as cognitive-behavioral therapy (CBT) and medication-assisted treatment have been shown to help decrease alcohol dependence. Often both the alcohol misuse and psychological problems need to be treated at the same time. Another specialized psychotherapy that has been developed is Concurrent Treatment of PTSD and Substance Use Disorders with Prolonged Exposure (COPE). This approach incorporates exposure-based techniques for PTSD with cognitive-behavioral strategies used for substance disorders like alcohol misuse.

=== Puberty ===
Gender differences may affect drinking patterns and the risk for developing alcohol use disorders. Sensation-seeking behaviors have been previously shown to be associated with advanced pubertal maturation, as well as the company of deviant peers. Early pubertal maturation, as indicated by advanced morphological and hormonal development, has been linked to increased alcohol usage in both male and female individuals. Additionally, when controlling for age, this association between advanced development and alcohol use still held true.

Until recently, the underlying mechanisms mediating the link between pubertal maturation and increased alcohol use in adolescence was poorly understood. Now research has suggested that sex steroid hormone levels may play a role in this interaction. When controlling for age, it was demonstrated that elevated estradiol and testosterone levels in male teenagers undergoing pubertal development was linked to increased alcohol consumption. It has been suggested that sex hormones promote alcohol consumption behaviors in teens by stimulating areas in the male adolescent brain associated with reward processing. The same associations with hormone levels were not demonstrated in females undergoing pubertal development. It is hypothesized that sex steroid hormones, such as testosterone and estradiol, are stimulating areas in the male brain that function to promote sensation-seeking and status-seeking behaviors and result in increased alcohol usage.

Additionally, the enzyme TTTAn aromatase, which functions in the male brain to convert testosterone to estradiols, has been linked to addictive and reward-seeking behaviors. Therefore, the increased activity of the enzyme may be influencing male adolescent alcohol-usage behaviors during pubertal development. The underlying mechanisms for female alcohol consumption and abuse is still under examination, but is believed to be largely influenced by morphological, rather than hormonal, changes during puberty as well as the presence of deviant peer groups.

=== Genetic influences ===
Several research studies suggest significant genetic contributions to alcohol use disorder. According to some adoption research, biological influences were strongly related to outcomes of adoptees. Among adoptees, a stronger correlation was found between alcohol use disorder and their biological parents than their adoptive parents. Other research adds that while multiple genes may be potentially implicated, alcohol dehydrogenase 1B (ADH1B) and aldehyde dehydrogenase 2 (ALDH2; mitochondrial aldehyde dehydrogenase), have been chiefly associated with excess alcohol consumption.

Nevertheless, alcohol use disorder entails a biopsychosocial component and genetics alone may not necessarily be causal in alcohol use disorder. There are numerous contributing risk factors which add to the complexity of alcohol including age, environment, psychiatric comorbidities and other substance use.

== Mechanisms ==
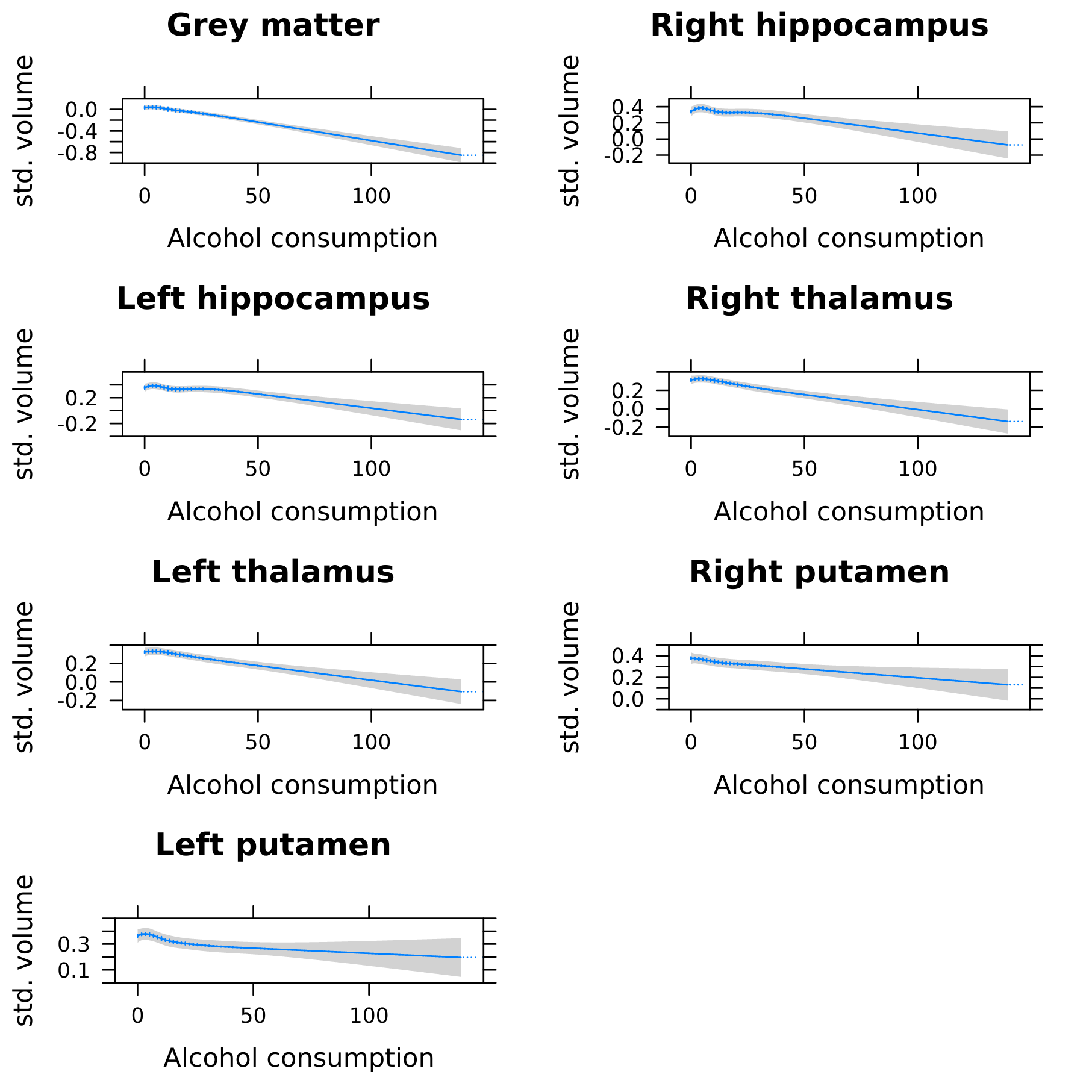
Effects of alcohol use on volume of various brain regions

Excessive alcohol use causes neuroinflammation and leads to myelin disruptions and white matter loss. The developing adolescent brain is at increased risk of brain damage and other long-lasting alterations to the brain. Adolescents with an alcohol use disorder damage the hippocampal, prefrontal cortex, and temporal lobes. Chronic alcohol exposure can result in increased DNA damage in the brain, as well as reduced DNA repair and increased neuronal cell death. Alcohol metabolism generates genotoxic acetaldehyde and reactive oxygen species.

The brain goes through dynamic changes during adolescence as a result of advancing pubertal maturation, and alcohol can damage long- and short-term growth processes in teenagers. The rewarding effects of alcohol are attributed to dopamine, serotonin, GABA, endocannabinoids, serotonin and opioid peptides.

Alcohol is the most recreationally used drug internationally; throughout history it has played a variety of roles, from medicine to a mood enhancer. Alcoholism and alcohol abuse, however, have undergone rigorous examination as a disease which has pervasive physiological and biosocial implications. The genesis and maintenance of the disease involves the mind, body, society and culture. A common anthropological approach to understanding alcoholism is one which relates to a social factor, and this is cross-cultural studies. The description and analysis of the degree of possibilities in drinking and its results among various populations indeed constitutes one of anthropology's major contributions to the field of alcohol studies. Understanding interactions between factors and evaluating ideas regarding how alcohol usage correlates to other cultural elements requires a number of cross-cultural comparisons. Anthropologists have analyzed a large global sample of cultures examining the association between particular traits for each which relate to the cultural components of alcoholism, these include significant measures which emphasize the social system, reliance and anxiety and strength as physical and social measures. These are the primary drivers of consuming alcohol affecting individuals on a psychosocial level.

== Cultural influences ==
Individualistic cultures such as the United States or Australia are amongst some of the highest consumers of alcohol in the whole world, however this rate of consumption does not necessarily coincide with the rate of abuse as countries like Russia which are highly collectivist see the highest rates of alcohol use disorder. Research suggests that people who score highly on individualism, a trait commonly fostered by the culture, report a lower rate of alcohol abuse and alcohol related disorders so much so that the association was negative, however a higher average consumption of alcohol per week. It is implied that individuals will drink more in a given setting, or on average because they are less receptive towards negative social attitudes surrounding excessive consumption. This however acts on another component, by where individualism protects from maladaptive consumption by lowering the need to drink socially. The final axis by which individualism protects from abusive consumption is that it promotes higher degrees of individualization and achievement values which promote personally suited rewards, this allow the individual to be more cognizant of potential alcohol abuse, and therefore protect from damaging mentalities in those who already identify as drinkers.

Alcohol use disorder also has a variety of biosocial implications, such as the physiologically effects of a detox, how the detox period interacts with ones social life and how these interactions can make overcoming addiction a complex, difficult process. Alcohol use disorder can lead to a number of physical issues and may even create a mental health condition, leading to a double classification for the alcoholic. The stress, the social perceptions of these issues may reinforce abusive drinking habits.

== Diagnosis ==
=== DSM-IV ===
Alcohol abuse was defined in the DSM-IV as a maladaptive pattern of drinking. For its diagnosis, at least one of the following criteria had to be fulfilled in the last 12 months:

- Recurrent use of alcohol resulting in a failure to fulfill major role obligations at work, school, or home
- Recurrent alcohol use in situations in which it is physically hazardous
- Recurrent alcohol-related legal problems
- Continued alcohol use despite having persistent or recurrent social or interpersonal problems caused or exacerbated by the effects of alcohol

=== DSM-5 ===
The alcohol abuse diagnosis is no longer used in the DSM-5 (released in 2013), it is now part of the alcohol use disorder diagnosis. Of the four alcohol abuse criteria, all except the one referring to alcohol-related legal problems are included in the alcohol use disorder criteria. For the specific diagnosis, clinicians use the ICD-10-CM system to classify the specific disorder, which includes the disorder classification and its severity. There are two main categories of codes - one for the use disorder itself, and one for substance-induced disorder. If the alcohol use is causing other problems, the induced disorder code must be used; if the alcohol use is present but not causing additional problems, the use disorder code must be used. F10 is the umbrella subcode for various alcohol-related disorders.

=== Screening ===
The Alcohol Use Disorders Identification Test (AUDIT) is considered the most accurate alcohol screening tool for identifying potential alcohol misuse, including dependence. It was developed by the World Health Organisation, designed initially for use in primary healthcare settings with supporting guidance.

== Prevention ==
Amid the medical world's reappraisal of alcohol's health effects, the proportion of Americans who believe even moderate alcohol consumption—one or two drinks per day—is bad for one's health has doubled. Concurrently, the number of people who report drinking alcohol has declined.

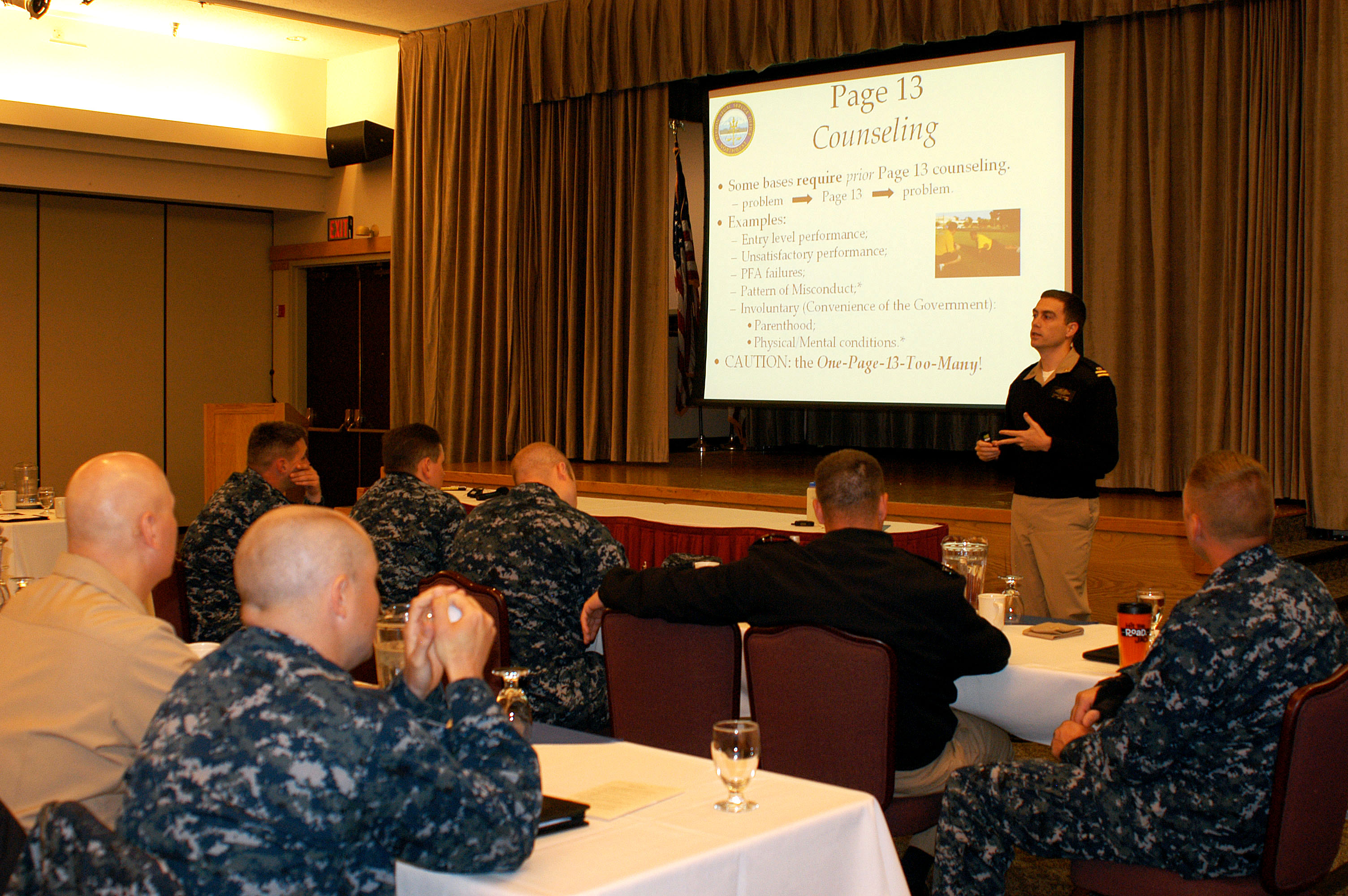
The United States Navy provides informative, in-depth training on alcohol and drug abuse prevention to sailors and supervisors.

Preventing or reducing the harm has been called for via increased taxation of alcohol, stricter regulation of alcohol advertising, and the provision of brief Interventions. Brief Interventions for alcohol abuse reduce the incidence of unsafe sex, sexual violence, unplanned pregnancy, and, likely, STD transmission. Information and education on social norms and the harms associated with alcohol abuse delivered via the internet or face-to-face has not been found to result in any meaningful benefit in changing harmful drinking behaviours in young people.

According to European law, individuals who are suffering from alcohol abuse or other related problems cannot be given a driver's license, or if in possession of a license cannot get it renewed. This is a way to prevent individuals driving under the influence of alcohol, but does not prevent alcohol abuse per se.

An individual's need for alcohol can depend on their family's alcohol use history. For instance, if it is discovered that their family history with alcohol has a strong pattern, there might be a need for education to be set in place to reduce the likelihood of reoccurrence (Powers, 2007). However, studies have established that those with alcohol abuse tend to have family members who try to provide help. On many of these occasions, the family members would try to help the individual to change or to help improve the individual's lifestyle.

== Social stigma ==
Several research studies suggest that stigmatization of substance use disorder is partially rooted in the belief that addiction is not a chronic illness but rather a conscious decision indicative of poor self-control or lacking restraint. Necessarily, public and internalized stigma surrounding alcoholism can have widespread effects. In an epidemiological survey of individuals with reported alcohol use disorder, the desire to both initiate and complete treatment were severely impacted by the stigma of substance use disorder. Participants conveyed fears pertaining to social rejection and discrimination, job loss, and potential legal consequences.

Men's issues with alcohol are shockingly common, yet societal norms often downplay the severity of this problem. Prevailing cultural images of men as stoic figures who can handle their alcohol perpetuate the dangerous myth that excessive drinking is a sign of strength. However, the reality is far from this stereotype, as men face unique challenges contributing to their struggles with alcohol, such as societal expectations, workplace pressures, and traditional notions of masculinity that discourage vulnerability.

A major barrier to seeking treatment for those struggling with alcohol abuse is the stigma associated with alcohol abuse itself. Those who struggle with alcohol abuse are less likely to utilize substance (or alcohol) abuse treatment services when they perceived higher stigma with alcohol abuse. Additionally, study participants described the physical act of initiating treatment as substantiation of problematic drinking. Others attempted to avoid treatment and subsequent stigmatization by adjusting drinking behaviors to what they believed to be less maladaptive. Modifications included limiting excessive drinking to non-school or workdays, avoiding alcohol consumption before 5PM, or limiting use to weekends. stigmatization of individuals who abuse alcohol has been linked to increased levels of depression, increased levels of anxiety, decreased levels of self-esteem, and poor sleeping habits. While negative thoughts and views around the subject of alcohol abuse can keep those struggling with this issue from seeking the treatment they need, there have been several things that have been found to reduce this stigma. Social support can be an effective tool for counteracting the harmful effects of stigma and shame on those struggling with alcohol abuse. Social support can help push those struggling with alcohol abuse to overcome the negative connotation associated with their struggle and finally seek the treatment that they need.

== Treatment ==
=== Rehabilitation ===
- Outpatient: Patients may live at home while in treatment and schedule therapy as needed. This allows patients the ability to work, attend school, and attend to activities of daily living as they normally would.
- Intensive Outpatient: Allows patients who do not require regular supervision to attend weekly therapy and is less intensive than PHPs.
- Partial Hospitalization Program: Allows patients who require regular supervision and need further detoxification to attend frequent therapy. While services are outpatient, sessions may occur up to 5 days per week and up to 8hrs per day.
- Residential: Available as short-term or long-term. Residential treatment offers 24-hour rehabilitation and care. Patients receive supervised and structured therapy focusing on how to manage their alcohol use disorder in a day to day living situation, learning how to interact with the world without the use of substances.

=== Pharmacotherapy ===
- Naltrexone: Naltrexone is a prescribed opioid receptor antagonist which reduces both the cravings and the rewarding effects associated with alcohol consumption. Because patients may experience an overall reduction of alcohol consumption (reduced drinks per day, extended time between drinking days), it may allow some patients to moderate their alcohol use. As Naltrexone will precipitate withdrawal in patients with opioid dependence, patients should be detoxified from opioids.
- Acamprosate: Though the mechanism of action is unclear, it is thought that Acamprosate modulates glutamate transmission. By modifying transmission along GABA and glutamine pathways, patients may experience decreased rewarding effects associated with alcohol intake and decreased withdrawal cravings.
- Disulfiram: Disulfiram is a prescribed medication which acts as an Aldehyde Dehydrogenase inhibitor, resulting in the accumulation of acetaldehyde. When Alcohol is consumed following Disulfiram, acetaldehyde builds up leading to unpleasant physiological effects (tachycardia, flushing, headache, nausea, and vomiting). Further, the severity of the reaction is dependent on the amount of alcohol consumed. Because of this physical discomfort, Disulfiram functions as a psychological deterrent and can be effective for highly motivated, abstinent patients under supervised settings. Notably, due its distressing effects with continued alcohol consumption, medication adherence can be difficult.
- Topiramate: Topiramate is an anticonvulsant approved for the management of epileptic seizures and used off label in the treatment of alcohol use disorder. It modulates GABA neurotransmission, and inhibits glutamate receptors, reducing cravings for alcohol and alcohol use.
- Gabapentin: Gabapentin is an anticonvulsant approved for the management of epileptic seizures and neuropathic pain and used off label in the treatment of alcohol use disorder. It modulates GABA synthesis, reducing cravings for alcohol and alcohol use.

=== Therapy Based Treatment ===
- Cognitive Behavioral Therapy (CBT): Patient and therapist set an agenda, review homework, and challenge cognitive distortions. The patients learn how their feelings and behavior are influenced by their thoughts. It can help patients manage the urge to drink using a problem-solving based approach.
- Motivational Interviewing (MI): Focuses on strengthening personal motivations for change. Patients discuss the need to alter their behavior and the reasons underlying their desire to do so.
- Motivational Enhancement Therapy (MET): MET is a version of MI that focuses specifically on patients struggling with alcohol and/or substance use. It is organized based on interventions designed changing patterns of alcohol consumption summarized as FRAMES: Feedback, Responsibility, Advice, Menu, Empathy, Self-Efficacy
- Mindfulness: Mindfulness-based intervention programs (that encourage people to be aware of their own experiences in the present moment and of emotions that arise from thoughts) can reduce the consumption of alcohol.

=== Peer Support Groups ===
- Alcoholics Anonymous
- Al-Anon
- 12 step programs
- SMART Recovery

== Prognosis ==
Alcohol abuse during adolescence, especially early adolescence (i.e. before age 15), may lead to long-term changes in the brain which leaves them at increased risk of alcoholism in later years; genetic factors also influence age of onset of alcohol abuse and risk of alcoholism. For example, about 40 percent of those who begin drinking alcohol before age 15 develop alcohol dependence in later life, whereas only 10 percent of those who did not begin drinking until 20 years or older developed an alcohol problem in later life. It is not entirely clear whether this association is causal, and some researchers have been known to disagree with this view.

Alcohol use disorders often cause a wide range of cognitive impairments that result in significant impairment of the affected individual. If alcohol-induced neurotoxicity has occurred a period of abstinence for on average a year is required for the cognitive deficits of alcohol abuse to reverse.

College/university students who are heavy binge drinkers (three or more times in the past two weeks) are 19 times more likely to be diagnosed with alcohol dependence, and 13 times more likely to be diagnosed with alcohol abuse compared to non-heavy episodic drinkers, though the direction of causality remains unclear. Occasional binge drinkers (one or two times in the past two weeks), were found to be four times more likely to be diagnosed with alcohol abuse or dependence compared to non-heavy episodic drinkers.

== Epidemiology ==
Alcohol abuse is said to be most common in people aged between 15 and 24 years, according to Moreira 2009. However, this particular study of 7275 college students in England collected no comparative data from other age groups or countries.

Causes of alcohol abuse are complex and are likely the combination of many factors, from coping with stress to childhood development. The US Department of Health & Human Services identifies several factors influencing adolescent alcohol use, such as risk-taking, expectancies, sensitivity and tolerance, personality and psychiatric comorbidity, hereditary factors, and environmental aspects.

Studies show that child maltreatment such as neglect, physical, and/or sexual abuse, as well as having parents with alcohol abuse problems, increases the likelihood of that child developing alcohol use disorders later in life. According to Shin, Edwards, Heeren, & Amodeo (2009), underage drinking is more prevalent among teens that experienced multiple types of childhood maltreatment regardless of parental alcohol abuse, putting them at a greater risk for alcohol use disorders. Genetic and environmental factors play a role in the development of alcohol use disorders, depending on age. The influence of genetic risk factors in developing alcohol use disorders increase with age ranging from 28% in adolescence and 58% in adults.

== Societal and economic costs ==
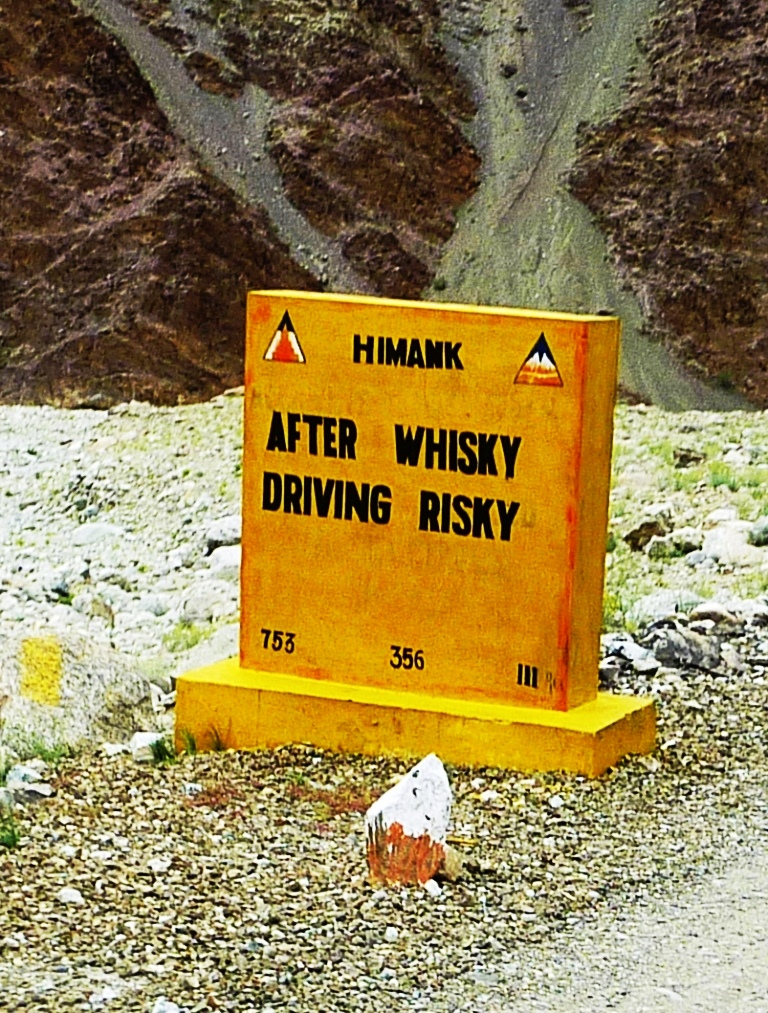
"After Whisky Driving Risky." Safety roadsign in Ladakh, India

Alcohol abuse is associated with many accidents, fights, and offences, including criminal. Alcohol is responsible in the world for 2.6 million deaths and results in disability in approximately 115.9 million people. Approximately 40 percent of the 115.9 million people disabled through alcohol abuse are disabled due to alcohol-related neuropsychiatric disorders. Alcohol abuse is highly associated with adolescent suicide. Adolescents who abuse alcohol are 17 times more likely to commit suicide than adolescents who don't drink. Additionally, alcohol abuse increases the risk of individuals either experiencing or perpetrating sexual violence. Alcohol availability and consumption rates and alcohol rates are positively associated with violent crimes, through specifics differ between particular countries and cultures.

=== By country ===
According to studies of present and former alcoholic drinkers in Canada, 20% of them are aware that their drinking has negatively impacted their lives in various vital areas including finances, work and relationships.

Problems caused by alcohol abuse in Ireland cost about 3.7 billion euro in 2007. The last cost analysis of the financial burden of alcohol-related harm was carried out in 2014 and amounted to around €2.35 billion. The OECD estimates that the annual damage is now between 9.6 and 12 billion euros.

In South Africa, where HIV infection is epidemic, alcohol abusers expose themselves to an increased risk of this infection due to displaying more sexually risky behaviour after drinking. This kind of behaviour includes not using protection, taking part in transactional sex, and/or having multiple sexual partners.

The introduction of alcopops, sweet and pleasantly flavoured alcoholic drinks, was responsible for half of the increase in alcohol abuse in 15- and 16-year-olds, according to one survey in Sweden. In the case of girls, the alcopops, which disguise the taste of alcohol, were responsible for two thirds of the increase. The introduction of alcopops to Sweden was a result of Sweden joining the European Union and adopting the entire European Union law.

Alcohol misuse costs the United Kingdom's National Health Service £3 billion per year. The cost to employers is 6.4 billion pounds sterling per year. These figures do not include the crime and social problems associated with alcohol misuse. The number of women regularly drinking alcohol has almost caught up with men. According to the Institute of Alcohol Studies in 2024, the annual cost of alcohol harm to society in England is £27.44 billion.

In the United States, many people are arrested for drinking and driving. Also, people under the influence of alcohol commit a large portion of various violent crimes, including child abuse and homicide. They also commit a large portion of acts of suicide. In addition, people of minority groups are affected by alcohol-related problems disproportionately, with the exception of Asian Americans. According to criminologist Hung-En Sung "alcohol is the most widely abused psychoactive substance in the United States".

In 2018, Ministry of Social Justice and Empowerment under the Government of India launched the National Action Plan for Drug Demand Reduction (NAPDDR). The Scheme of Assistance for the Prevention of Alcoholism & Substance (Drugs) Abuse and for Social Defence Services is the flagship programme which was launched under this action plan. Its objective is to create awareness about the ill effects of alcoholism and substance abuse, as well as providing a comprehensive range of community-based services for indemnification, motivation, counselling, de-addiction, aftercare, and rehabilitation for whole-person recovery (WPR) of addicts. In the 2025-26 budget, the Union Government allocated ₹333 crores to the NAPDDR.

== See also ==
- 0-0-1-3 – a United States Air Force program for alcohol abuse prevention
- Acting out
- Drunken monkey hypothesis
- Lying
- Manipulation (psychology)
- Peer pressure
- Psychological stress
- Self-medicating
- Stress-related disorders
- Tortured artist
