= Reactance (psychology) =

Unpleasant emotion experienced when behavioral freedom is threatened

In psychology, reactance is an unpleasant motivational reaction to offers, persons, rules, regulations, advice, recommendations, information, and messages that are perceived to threaten or eliminate specific behavioral freedoms. Reactance occurs when an individual feels that an agent is attempting to limit their choice of response or range of alternatives.

Reactance can occur when someone is heavily pressured into accepting a certain view or attitude. Reactance can encourage an individual to adopt or strengthen a view or attitude which is indeed contrary to that which was intended — which is to say, to a response of noncompliance — and can also increase resistance to persuasion. Some individuals might employ reverse psychology for their benefit, in an attempt to influence someone to choose the opposite of what is being requested. Reactance can occur when an individual senses that someone is trying to compel them to do something; often the individual will offer resistance and attempt to extricate themselves from the situation.

Some individuals are naturally high in reactance, a personality characteristic called trait reactance.

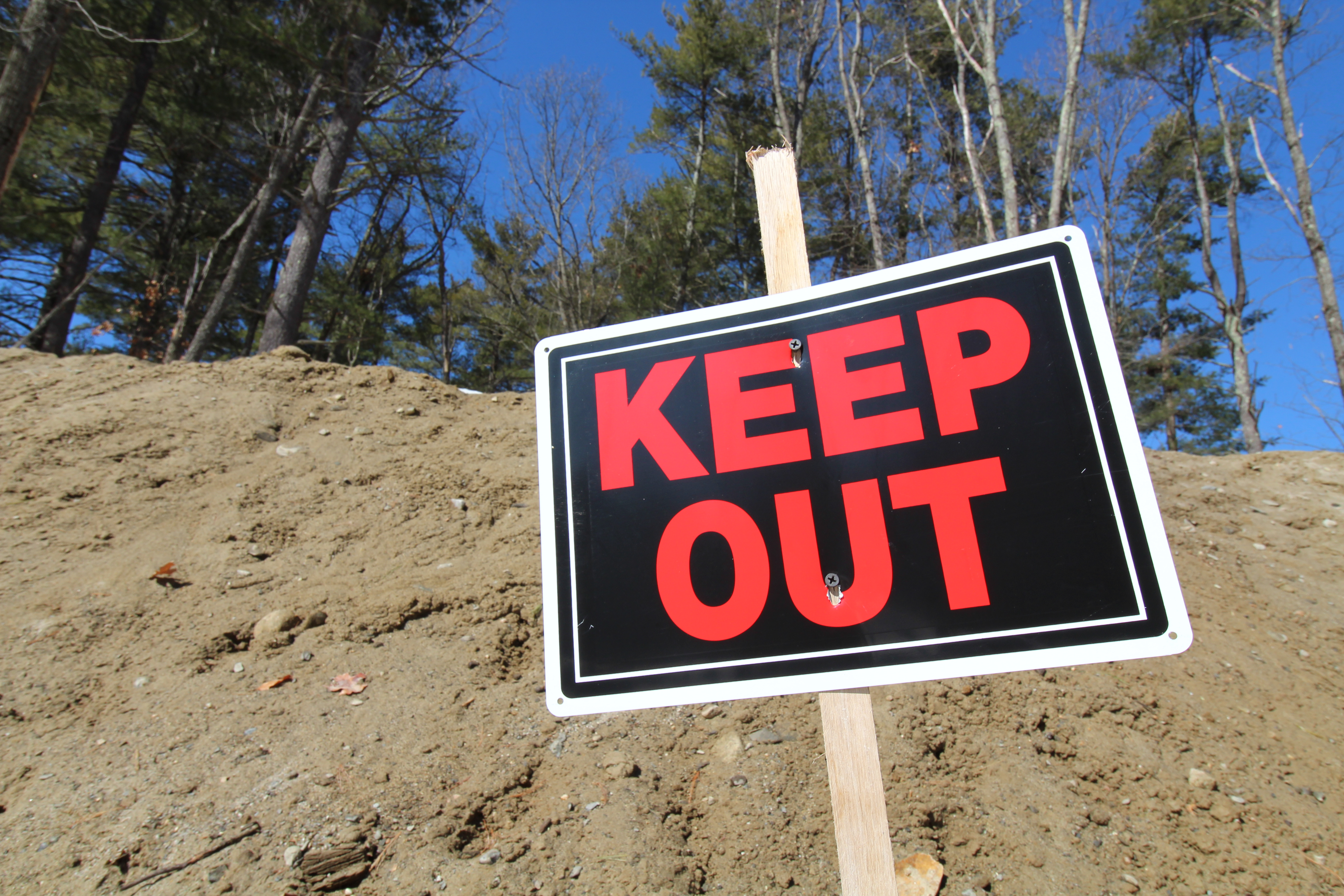
Signs such as these may arouse curiosity in the protected object or area, more so than if the sign wasn't there, due to the reactance effect

== Definition ==
Psychological reactance is "an unpleasant motivational arousal that emerges when people experience a threat to or loss of their free behaviors." An individual's freedom to select when and how to conduct their behavior, and the level to which they are aware of the relevant freedom—and are able to determine behaviors necessary to satisfy that freedom—affect the generation of psychological reactance. It is assumed that if a person's behavioral freedom is threatened or reduced, they become motivationally aroused. The fear of loss of further freedoms can spark this arousal and motivate them to re-establish the threatened freedom. Because this motivational state is a result of the perceived reduction of one's freedom of action, it is considered a counterforce, and thus is called "psychological reactance".

There are four important elements to reactance theory: perceived freedom, threat to freedom, reactance, and restoration of freedom. Freedom is not an abstract consideration, but rather a feeling associated with real behaviors, including actions, emotions, and attitudes.

Reactance also explains denial as it is encountered in addiction counselling. According to William R. Miller, "Research demonstrates that a counselor can drive resistance (denial) levels up and down dramatically according to his or her personal counseling style". Use of a "respectful, reflective approach" described in motivational interviewing and applied as motivational enhancement therapy, rather than by argumentation, the accusation of "being in denial", and direct confrontations, lead to the motivation to change and avoid the resistance and denial, or reactance, elicited by strong direct confrontation.

== Theory ==
The theory of psychological reactance specifies what is considered a freedom, how said freedom can be taken away or threatened, and how the psychological reactance will manifest itself. Reactance theory aims to understand motive behind behaviors when freedom is threatened or eliminated. In this theory, with the removal of freedom, an individual will attempt to restore said freedom. Reactance in this case is now the manifestation of the behaviors aimed to restore freedom. When the freedom is completely eliminated, reactance becomes maximal, as the lost freedom becomes more desirable.

Reactance theory assumes there are "free behaviors" individuals perceive and can take part in at any given moment. For a behavior to be free, the individual must have the relevant physical and psychological abilities to partake in it, and must know they can engage in it at the moment, or in the near future.

"Behavior" includes any imaginable act. More specifically, behaviors may be explained as "what one does (or doesn't do)", "how one does something", or "when one does something". It is not always clear, to an observer, or the individuals themselves, if they hold a particular freedom to engage in a given behavior. When a person has such a free behavior they are likely to experience reactance whenever that behavior is restricted, eliminated, or threatened with elimination.

There are several rules associated with free behaviors and reactance:

1. When certain free behaviors are threatened or removed, the more important a free behavior is to a certain individual the greater the magnitude of the reactance.
  1. The level of reactance has a direct relationship to the importance of the eliminated or threatened behavioral freedom, in relationship to the importance of other freedoms at the time.
2. With a given set of free behaviors, the greater the proportion threatened or eliminated, the greater will be the total level of reactance.
3. When an important free behavior has been threatened with elimination, the greater will be the threat, and the greater will be the level of reactance.
  1. When there is a loss of a single free behavior, there may be by implication a related threat of removal of other free behaviors now or in the future.
  2. A free behavior may be threatened or eliminated by virtue of the elimination (or threat of elimination) of another free behavior; therefore a free behavior may be threatened by the relation of the elimination of (or threat to) another person's free behavior.

Other core concepts of the theory are justification and legitimacy. A possible effect of justification is a limitation of the threat to a specific behavior or set of behaviors. For example, if Mr. Doe states that he is interfering with Mrs. Smith's expectations because of an emergency, this keeps Mrs Smith from imagining that Mr. Doe will interfere on future occasions as well. Likewise, legitimacy may point to a set of behaviors threatened since there will be a general assumption that an illegitimate interference with a person's freedom is less likely to occur. With legitimacy there is an additional implication that a person's freedom is equivocal.

== Effects ==
In the phenomenology of reactance, there is no assumption that a person will be aware of reactance. When persons become aware of reactance, they will feel a higher level of self-direction in relationship to their own behaviour. In other words, they will feel that if they are able to do what they want, then they do not have to do what they do not want. In this case, when the freedom is in question, that person alone is the director of their own behaviour.

When considering the direct re-establishment of freedom, the greater the magnitude of reactance, the more the individual will try to re-establish the freedom that has been lost or threatened. When a freedom is threatened by a social pressure, then reactance will lead a person to resist that pressure. Also, when there are restraints against a direct re-establishment of freedom, there can be attempts at re-establishment by implication whenever possible.

Freedom can and may be reestablished by a social implication. When an individual has lost free behavior because of a social threat, then the participation in a free-like behavior by a similar person will allow the individual to re-establish their freedom.

Reactance is a motivational state that is aimed at re-establishment of a threatened or eliminated freedom. In short, the level of reactance has a direct relationship with the importance of the eliminated or threatened freedom, and the proportion of free behaviours eliminated or threatened.

== Empirical evidence ==
A number of studies have looked at psychological reactance, providing empirical evidence for the behaviour; some key studies are discussed below.

Brehm's 1981 study, "Psychological reactance and the attractiveness of unobtainable objects: sex differences in children's responses to an elimination of freedom", examined the differences in sex and age in a child's view of the attractiveness of obtained and unobtainable objects. The study reviewed how well children respond in these situations and determined if the children being observed thought the "grass was greener on the other side". It also determined how well the child made peace with the world if they devalued what they could not have. This work concluded that when a child cannot have what they want, they experience emotional consequences of not getting it.

In this study the results were duplicated from a previous study by Hammock and J. Brehm (1966). The male subjects wanted what they could not obtain, however the female subjects did not conform to the theory of reactance. Although their freedom to choose was taken away, it had no overall effect on them.

Silvia's 2005 study "Deflecting reactance: The role of similarity in increasing compliance and reducing resistance" concluded that one way to increase the activity of a threatened freedom is to censor it, or provide a threatening message toward the activity. In turn a "boomerang effect" occurs, in which people choose forbidden alternatives. This study also shows that social influence has better results when it does not threaten one's core freedoms. Two concepts revealed in this study are that a communicator may be able to increase the positive force towards compliance by increasing their credibility, and that increasing the positive communication force and decreasing the negative communication force simultaneously should increase compliance.

Miller and colleagues concluded in their 2006 study, "Identifying principal risk factors for the initiation of adolescent smoking behaviors: The significance of psychological reactance", that psychological reactance is an important indicator in adolescent smoking initiation. Peer intimacy, peer individuation, and intergenerational individuation are strong predictors of psychological reactance. The overall results of the study indicate that children think that they are capable of making their own decisions, although they are not aware of their own limitations. This is an indicator that adolescents will experience reactance to authoritative control, especially the proscriptions and prescriptions of adult behaviors that they view as hedonically relevant.

Latané and Darley's 1968 study demonstrated how the nonreactance of others can influence an individual's own, even in potentially health-hazardous situations. Male subjects were placed in a room into which smoke was pumped, and the subjects were tested for whether or not they reported the smoke to experimenters. When individually tested, 75% of participants reported smoke coming into the room, compared to 10% when there were two nonreactive others. In the third group, three individuals were grouped together and were generally watching each other for reactions. In this third group, there was a 38% report of smoke. When seeing others nonreactive to the smoke, the individual would interpret the smoke as something not harmful.

A number of studies have also looked into media use and reactance. For instance, an experiment that exposed participants to immigration messages that was threatening (for example via group stereotypes and uncivil language) resulted in very large reactance, in the form of anger and counterarguing.

== Measurement ==
Dillard & Shen have provided evidence that psychological reactance can be measured, in contrast to the contrary opinion of Jack Brehm, who developed the theory. In their work they measured the impact of psychological reactance with two parallel studies: one advocating flossing and the other urging students to limit their alcohol intake.

They formed several conclusions about reactance. Firstly reactance is mostly cognitive; this allows reactance to be measurable by self-report techniques. Also, in support of previous research, they conclude reactance is in part related to an anger response. This verifies Brehm's description that during the reactance experience one tends to have hostile or aggressive feelings, often aimed more at the source of a threatening message than at the message itself. Finally, within reactance, both cognition and affect are intertwined; Dillard and Shen suggest they are so intertwined that their effects on persuasion cannot be distinguished from each other. Dillard and Shen's research indicates reactance can effectively be studied using established self-report methods. Furthermore, it provided a better understanding of reactance theory and its relationship to persuasive health communication.

Miller and colleagues conducted their 2007 study Psychological reactance and promotional health messages: the effects of controlling language, lexical concreteness, and the restoration of freedom at the University of Oklahoma, with the primary goal being to measure the effects of controlling language in promotional health messages. Their research revisited the notion of restoring freedom by examining the use of a short postscripted message tagged on the end of a promotional health appeal. The results of the study indicated that more concrete messages generate greater attention than less concrete (more abstract) messages. Also, the source of concrete messages can be seen as more credible than the source of abstract messages. They concluded that the use of more concrete, low-controlling language, and the restoration of freedom through the inclusion of a choice-emphasizing postscript, may offer the best solution to reducing ambiguity and reactance created by overtly persuasive health appeals.

== Origin ==
Claims were made by evolutionary psychologists that reactance owes its origin to competitive tendencies of human ancestors. Researcher Abilio de Almeida Neto believes that the tendency to act against communication from others (as he interprets reactance) has an evolutionary function – it is a signal that carries information about the status in the dominance hierarchy. These claims weren't sufficiently founded, as the studies, used to demonstrate reactance in animals didn't account for 2 factors:

- In humans, a certain option is valued higher precisely because of its obvious limitation or prohibition;
- Citation of animal experiments that fail to reflect the dominance aspect cannot prove that reactance is rooted in dominance.

If dominance hypothesis is right, reactance would only be manifested in animals that live in groups and compete for status, while there are many other factors in animal life which require preserving amounts of behavioral options. Behavioral extension of reactance must first be studied in other primates, for which more experimental methods of measurement are needed.

== See also ==
- Bre'er Rabbit and the Tar Baby, an Uncle Remus trickster tale known for its quotation, "Please don't fling me in that briar patch"
- Ironic process theory
- Reverse psychology (and iterations including "double[-]reverse psychology", etc.)
- Streisand effect, the phenomenon whereby an attempt to hide, remove, or censor a piece of information has the unintended consequence of publicizing the information more widely, usually facilitated by the Internet.
- The Scout Mindset
