= Cocaine dependence =

Neurological disorder related to persistent cocaine use

- Specialty: Psychiatry, clinical psychology

Cocaine dependence is a neurological disorder characterized by withdrawal symptoms upon cessation of cocaine use. It often occurs alongside cocaine addiction, a biopsychosocial disorder characterized by persistent use of cocaine despite substantial harm. The Diagnostic and Statistical Manual of Mental Disorders, 5th edition (DSM-5) classifies problematic cocaine use as a stimulant use disorder. The 11th revision of the International Classification of Diseases (ICD-11) includes "Cocaine dependence" as a classification (diagnosis) under "Disorders due to use of cocaine".

Cocaine use generally induces feelings of euphoria and increased energy. Adverse effects include mood swings, paranoia, insomnia, psychosis, high blood pressure, tachycardia, panic attacks, seizures that are extremely difficult to control, cognitive impairments, and drastic changes in personality. Overdoses can cause cardiovascular and brain damage, such as vasoconstriction in the brain, potentially resulting in a stroke; constricted arteries in the heart, potentially causing heart attacks; and status epilepticus.

Symptoms of cocaine withdrawal range from moderate to severe and include dysphoria, depression, anxiety, decreased libido, weakness, pain, and cravings for cocaine.

== Signs and symptoms ==
Cocaine is a powerful stimulant known to make users feel energetic, cheerful, talkative, etc. In time, negative side effects include increased body temperature, irregular or rapid heart rate, high blood pressure, increased risk of heart attacks, strokes and even sudden death from cardiac arrest. Many people who habitually use cocaine develop a transient, manic-like condition similar to amphetamine psychosis and schizophrenia, whose symptoms include aggression, severe paranoia, restlessness, confusion and tactile hallucinations; which can include the feeling of something crawling under the skin (formication), also known as "coke bugs", during binges. Different ingestion techniques have their own symptoms that accompany them. Snorting it can cause a loss of sense of smell, nose bleeds, problems swallowing and an inflamed, runny nose. Smoking it causes lung damage and injecting it puts users at risk of contracting infectious diseases like HIV and hepatitis C. Heavy users of cocaine have also reported having thoughts of suicide, unusual weight loss, trouble maintaining relationships, and an unhealthy, pale appearance.

Assessment tools like the Obsessive Compulsive Cocaine Use Scale (OCCUS) may be employed to quantify obsessive and compulsive thoughts related to cocaine consumption; it has been used and validated in a clinical study with cocaine-dependent individuals.

=== Cocaine-induced midline destructive lesions ===
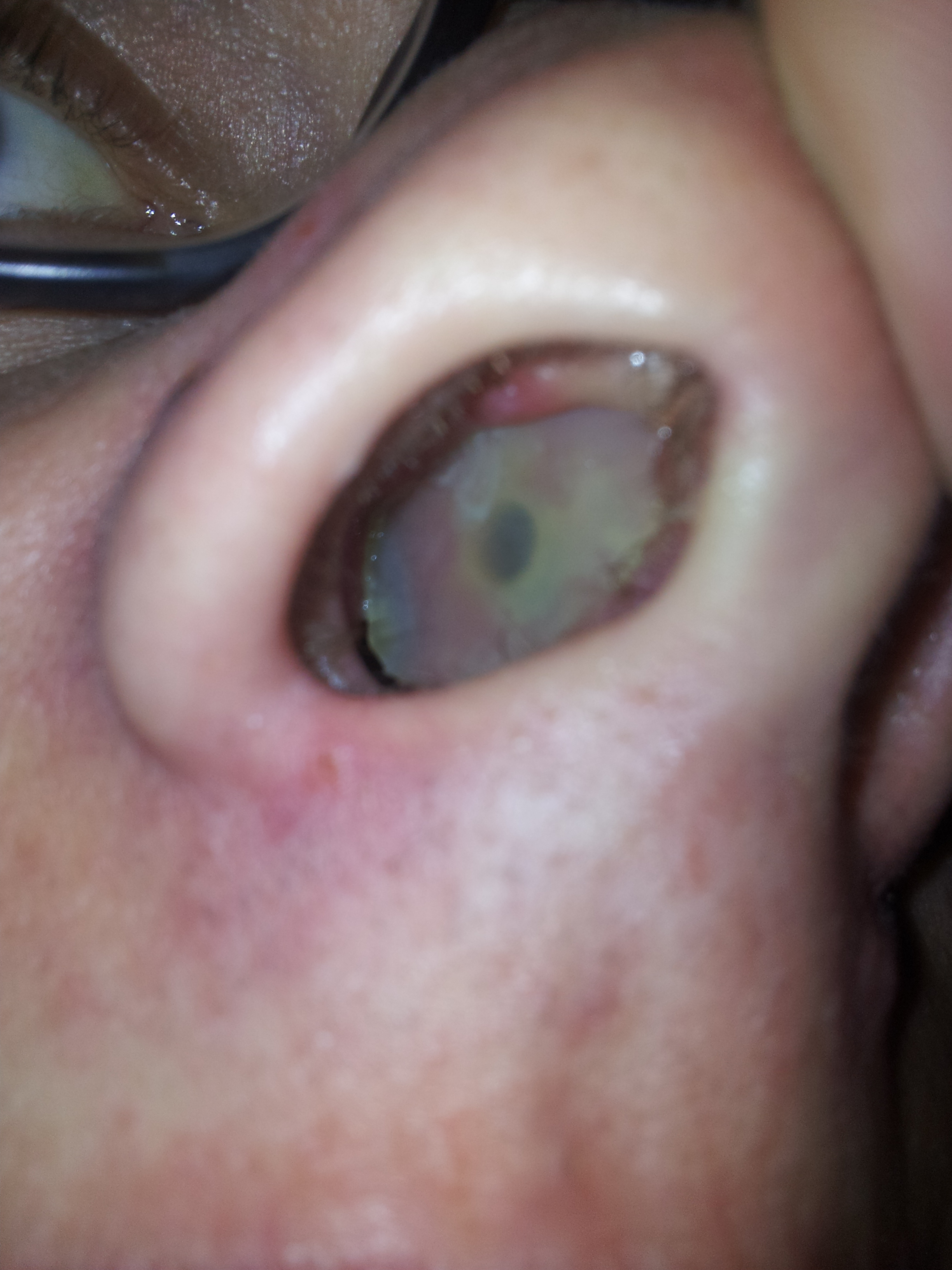
Nasal septum perforation (pictured), which can result from chronic cocaine abuse, may progress to more extensive damage known as CIMDL.

Cocaine-induced midline destructive lesions (CIMDL), colloquially known as "coke nose", is the progressive destruction of nasal architecture with the erosion of the palate, nasal conchae, and ethmoid sinuses associated with prolonged insufflation, colloquially 'snorting', of cocaine.

=== Withdrawal symptoms ===
When used habitually, cocaine can change brain structure and function, resulting in addiction. Circuits within the brain structure that play a part in stress signals become more sensitive. When cocaine is not being used this increases an individual's displeasure and negative moods. In 1986, Gawin and Kleber led an important study on the withdrawal symptoms of cocaine users. In this study, three distinct phases were reported. These phases are the 'crash', 'withdrawal' and 'extinction'. The 'crash' phase or phase 1 occurs directly after cocaine is not being used anymore. Withdrawal symptoms for this phase are exhaustion, hypersomnia, no cravings to use, dysthymia, increased appetite, restlessness, and irritability. The second phase, or 'withdrawal' phase occurs 1–10 weeks after cocaine users quit. Symptoms include lethargy, anxiety, erratic sleep, strong craving, emotional lability, irritability, depression, poor concentration, and bowel issues. Finally, the last phase or the 'extinction' phase occurs up to 28 weeks after discontinued use. Symptoms include episodic cravings and some dysphoria.

== Epidemiology ==
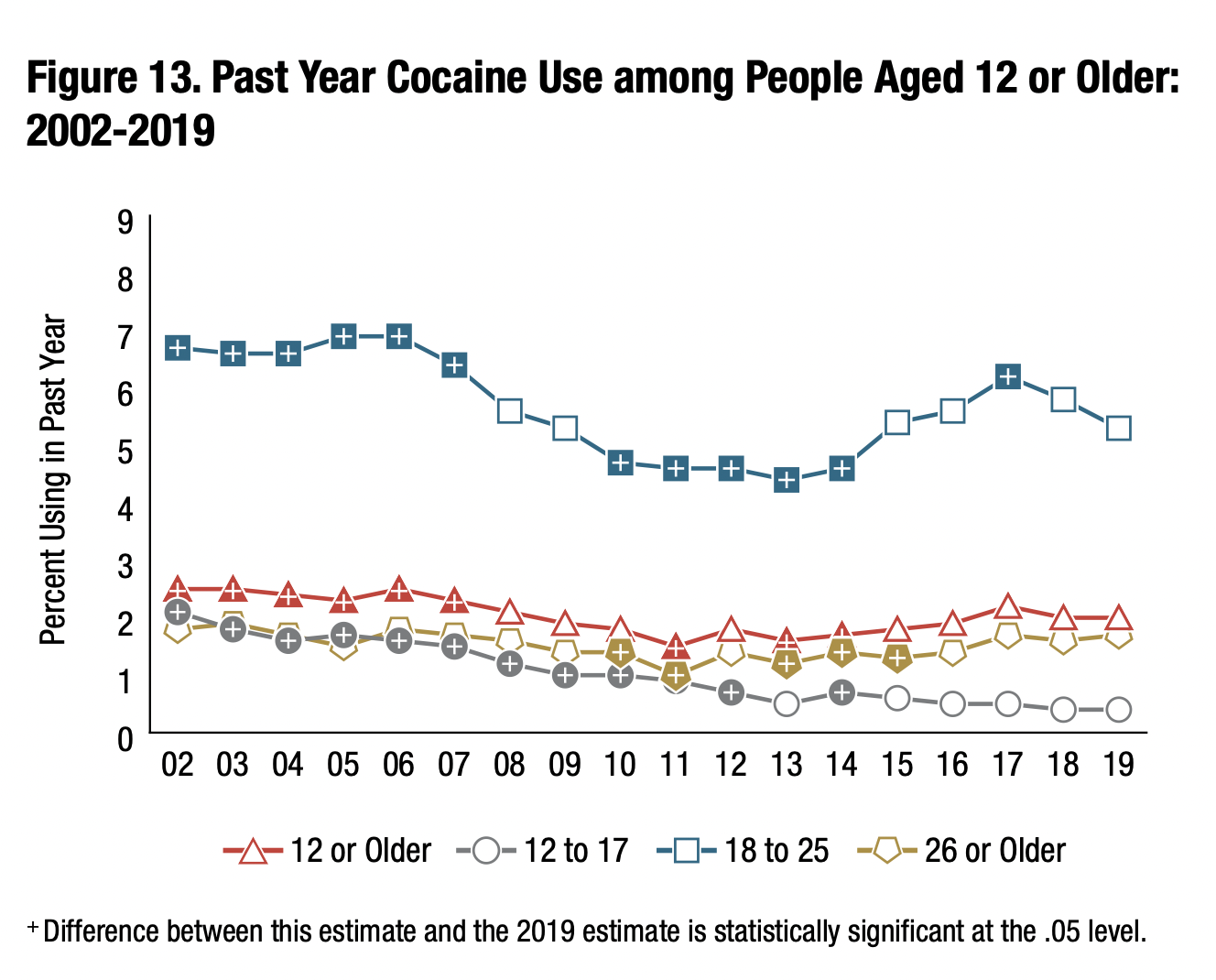
Past year cocaine use among people aged 12 or older: 2002–2019 (U.S.)

In the United States, past year cocaine users in 2019 was 5.5 million for people aged 12 or older. When broken into age groups, ages 12–17 had 97,000 users; ages 18–25 had 1.8 million users and ages 26 or older had 3.6 million users.

Past year cocaine users with a cocaine use disorder in 2019 was 1 million for people aged 12 or older. When broken into age groups, ages 12–17 had 5,000 people with a cocaine use disorder; ages 18–25 had 250,000 people with a cocaine use disorder and ages 26 or older had 756,000 people with a cocaine use disorder

In the United States, cocaine overdose deaths have been on the rise and in 2019, the CDC reported over 16,000 deaths from cocaine overdose.

== Risk ==
Death rate from cocaine

A study consisting of 1,081 U.S. residents who had first used cocaine within the previous 24 months was conducted. It was found that the risk of becoming dependent on cocaine within two years of first use was 5–6%. The risk of becoming dependent within 10 years of first use increased to 15–16%. These were the aggregate rates for all types of use considered, such as smoking, snorting, and injecting. Among recent-onset users individual rates of dependency were higher for smoking (3.4 times) and much higher for injecting. Women were 3.3 times more likely to become dependent, compared with men. Users who started at ages 12 or 13 were four times as likely to become dependent compared to those who started between ages 18 and 20.

However, a study of non-deviant (Note: The study's authors stated that they wanted to know which effects and consequences of cocaine use would become visible with persons who are mainstream citizens or as close to that social stratum as possible) users in Amsterdam found a "relative absence of destructive and compulsive use patterns over a ten year period" and concluded that cocaine users can and do exercise control. "Our respondents applied two basic types of controls to themselves: 1) restricting use to certain situations and to emotional states in which cocaine's effects would be most positive, and 2) limiting mode of ingestion to snorting of modest amounts of cocaine, staying below 2.5 grams a week for some, and below 0.5 grams a week for most. Nevertheless, those whose use level exceeded 2.5 grams a week all returned to lower levels".

== Comorbidity ==
About 25% of adults with attention deficit hyperactivity disorder (ADHD) use cocaine, and 10% develop a cocaine use disorder during their lifetime. Because cocaine use can worsen health outcomes, adults with ADHD should be screened for cocaine use disorder and referred for treatment if needed.

After adjusting for demographic factors and other substance use disorders (SUDs), only bipolar disorder and antisocial personality disorder (ASPD) were directly linked to greater severity of cocaine dependence. The presence of another SUD generally increased cocaine dependence severity, especially with opioids and alcohol, while cannabis use was associated with less severe cocaine dependence. Severe psychiatric disorders like bipolar disorder and ASPD may lead to longer periods of heavy cocaine use, highlighting the need for targeted interventions in these groups.

Additionally, while major depressive disorder (MDD) and post-traumatic stress disorder (PTSD) did not increase the severity of cocaine dependence, they were associated with a higher likelihood of seeking treatment or self-help. This suggests that mood and anxiety disorders may increase psychosocial stress, motivating individuals to pursue help. The findings emphasize the importance of addressing co-occurring mood or anxiety disorders with specific psychotherapy or medication in those with cocaine dependence.

== Treatment ==
=== Therapy ===
Twelve-step programs such as Cocaine Anonymous (modeled on Alcoholics Anonymous) have been widely used to help those with cocaine addiction. Cognitive behavioral therapy (CBT), dialectical behavior therapy (DBT), rational emotive behavior therapy (REBT), and motivational interviewing (MI) can be especially powerful approaches to treating cocaine addiction. Cognitive behavioral therapy combined with motivational therapy (MT) has proven to be more helpful than 12 step programs in treating cocaine dependency. However, both these approaches have a fairly low success rate as research suggests that the withdrawal symptoms can last for several weeks. For instance, one of the main predictors of a successful recovery is the number of continuous days a person is able to go without using the substance. Alternative holistic treatments such as physical exercise and meditation have been proven effective in reducing cocaine cravings. Other non-pharmacological treatments such as acupuncture and hypnosis have been explored, but without conclusive results.

=== Medications ===
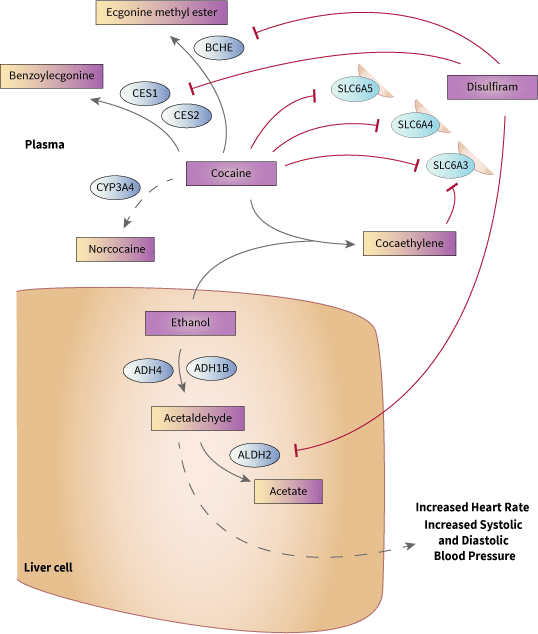
Stylized diagram showing candidate genes involved in the pharmacodynamics of disulfiram and its impact on the pharmacokinetics of ethanol and cocaine.

Numerous medications have been investigated for use in cocaine dependence, but as of 2015, none of them were considered to be effective.

Disulfiram is a dopamine β-hydroxylase (DBH) inhibitor. DBH inhibition by disulfiram may explain its possible therapeutic benefits in cocaine dependence as well as cases of psychosis and mania associated with the drug.

Anticonvulsants, such as carbamazepine, gabapentin, lamotrigine, and topiramate, do not appear to be effective as treatment. Limited evidence suggests that antipsychotics are also ineffective for treatment of cocaine dependence. Few studies have examined bupropion (a novel antidepressant) for cocaine dependence; however, trials performed thus far have not shown it to be an effective form of treatment for this purpose.

The National Institute on Drug Abuse (NIDA) of the U.S. National Institutes of Health is researching modafinil, a narcolepsy drug and mild stimulant, as a potential cocaine treatment. Ibogaine has been under investigation as a treatment for cocaine dependency and is used in clinics in Mexico, the Netherlands and Canada. It was legal for a time in Costa Rica, but has been illegal since 2018. It is illegal to use in many countries, such as Sweden, Norway, the United Kingdom, and in the United States. Other medications that have been investigated for this purpose include acetylcysteine, baclofen, and vanoxerine. Medications such as phenelzine, have been used to cause an "aversion reaction" when administered with cocaine. (Note: ←Page #928 (4th page of article) ¶4. §(1), (2) & (3); Lines 10—12 & 15—18 of aforementioned 4th ¶.)

==== Vaccine ====
TA-CD is an active vaccine developed by the Xenova Group which is used to negate the effects of cocaine, making it suitable for use in treatment of addiction. It is created by combining norcocaine with inactivated cholera toxin.

== Research ==
Transcranial magnetic stimulation (TMS) is being studied as a treatment for cocaine addiction, although definitive evidence for efficacy does not yet exist.

Other research on rodents has suggested that cocaine use leads to complexes of dopamine transporters, which build up tolerance to the drug. It's possible that future treatment for cocaine addiction might target those complexes. Synaptogyrin-3, a synaptic vesicle protein, binds to dopamine transporters and regulates the effects of cocaine on dopamine neurotransmission and rodent self-administration behavior. Elevating levels of synaptogyrin-3 made animals resilient to cocaine, and a possible future treatment for cocaine addiction might be based on targeting this protein.

== See also ==
- SB-277011-A – a dopamine D_{3} receptor antagonist, used in the study of cocaine addiction. Where cocaine reduces the threshold for brain electrical self-stimulation in rats, an indication of cocaine's rewarding effects, SB-277011-A completely reverses this effect.
