= Motivational enhancement therapy =

Type of therapy used to treat substance use disorders

Motivational enhancement therapy (MET) is a time-limited, four-session adaptation used in Project MATCH, a U.S.-government-funded study of treatment for alcohol problems, and the "Drinkers' Check-up", which provides normative-based feedback and explores client motivation to change in light of the feedback. It is a development of motivational interviewing and motivational therapy. It focuses on the treatment of alcohol and other substance use disorders. The goal of the therapy is not to guide the patient through the recovery process, but to invoke inwardly motivated change through motivational strategies. The method has two elements: initial assessment battery session, and two to four individual therapeutic sessions with a therapist. During the first session, the specialist stimulates discussion on the patient's experiences with substance use disorder and elicits self-motivational statements by providing feedback to the initial assessment. The principles of MET are utilized to increase motivation and develop a plan for further change; coping strategies are also presented and talked over with the patient. Changes in the patients behavior are monitored and cessation strategies used are reviewed by the therapist in the subsequent sessions, where patients are encouraged to sustain abstinence and progress.

Motivational enhancement therapy is effective in helping adolescents because it focuses on the relationship of the counselor and the counselee. The most effective way to integrate this form of therapy is by light guidance directed to the intrinsic desire of the individual to change. Most adolescents will not trust their counselors which is why it is important to develop this relationship. By providing an environment that is receptive to change, a counselee can find this intrinsic motivation. A unique aspect of motivational enhancement therapy is that it is uniquely tailored to support adolescents that struggle with substance abuse by matching their attributes and readiness/willingness to change.

Affective change is how someone who is experiencing an insight of a solution. These moments can build confidence and have a positive effect on the person. Affective deals with changes in epistemic emotions. In order to invoke a change we need to have some sort of satisfaction in doing the change. Change can affect us emotionally and physically.

Motivational change can have a change in beliefs and attitudes, thus if you set your mind to it you can change the behavior. Satisfaction of a change is to have a renewed factory of oneself. Using statistical modeling we can improve our motivation to change our lives. Self-regulation explains the quality of progress towards a goal. Making small steps towards a goal will have a self of achievement as the progress is being made. This effort being made can have a positive feeling towards that goal.

Problem finding moments usually leads to moments that are able to find a solution. This is included because as we try to change our behavior there will be moments that are problematic and when we find a solution to that problem. We will learn about how to get to that certain goal with a different way of looking at how to reach a goal.

== Process ==
Motivational enhancement therapy is a strategy of therapy that involves a variation of motivational interviewing to analyze feedback gained from client sessions. Motivational Interviewing was originated by William Miller and Stephen Rollnick based on their experiences treating problem drinkers. The idea of Motivational Interviewing is based on engaging the client to pursue a behavior change. The method revolves around goal making, with assistance from the counselor to help guide the client to that specific set goal. This concept of motivational interviewing later developed into motivational enhancement therapy. The goal of this therapy is to help lead the client to achieve the goals they have set for themselves. Its aim is to provide the client with the opportunity to develop a focus in their life, other than their addiction.

The MET approach is grounded on the trans-theoretical perspective that "individuals move through a series of stages of change as they progress in modifying problem behaviors". In understanding change, this concept of stages is notable. Every stage has certain processes used and specific tasks to be accomplished in order to achieve change. MET focuses on motivational strategies using the client's own resources rather than training them through recovery step by step. This approach is very personal to each individual client it is used with, centered around the main goal of evoking change. Oftentimes individuals who undergo motivational transformation can subjectively experience a sudden realization or understanding of a formerly perplexing situation. Like a light bulb illuminating a dark room, an otherwise dark and bewildering issue can be made clear within an individual's internal self-concept. This is termed as an "aha moment", and can aid individuals in their newfound sense of focus in life.

Reality therapy is a closely related form of therapeutical work that works specifically with the present state of life. It stresses improving relationships through our choices. It asserts that even though we cannot control how we feel we do have control over our thoughts and actions. Through this, a client will be able to achieve control over their life and work toward improving the aspects they are dissatisfied with.

Therapists use "change talk" or motivational statements. It is claimed that this will help the patient challenge their belief that it is impossible to change.

== Patients/Clients ==
Addicts are one of the primary populations motivational enhancement therapy lends an aid to. The therapist works closely with the client to help create an inner willingness to fight their addiction. Unlike other therapy or counseling programs that offer a step-by-step process, MET focuses on creating an internally motivated change. A typical therapy session consists of an initial assessment, and two to four treatment sessions with the therapist. In the initial session, the therapist conducts a discussion about the client's substance use. They encourage the use of self-motivational statements through Motivational Interviewing. It is in this first session where a plan for change is established between the therapist and client. The following sessions are based around achieving that plan. Early research studies have indicated that psychedelics paired with MET can result in increased levels of abstinence, and the decrease of relapse and heavy drinking days. Further experimentation with the combining of psychedelics and MET could provide additional support for individuals struggling with alcoholism.

MET has become increasingly effective because it is grounded in self-motivation, meaning that individuals who seek help are genuinely motivated to change. It is also known by the National Institute on Alcohol Abuse and Alcoholism (NIAAA) to be one of the most cost-effective methods available.

== Key components ==
There are 5 key components to motivational enhancement therapy:

- Express empathy – Therapists seek to build trust and respect with the patient, making sure that each individual knows that the decision to change is ultimately up to them. The therapist acts as both a "supportive companion and knowledgeable consultant" in meetings.
- Develop discrepancy – Client's attention is enhanced and focused on discrepancies. Raising a client's awareness of personal consequences brings about a motivation for change, allowing the client to willingly discuss options to change "in order to reduce the perceived discrepancy and regain emotional equilibrium".
- Avoid argument – Arguments will be avoided and not engaged in. Therapists use strategies to help clients see true consequences and reduce the "perceived positive aspects" of behaviors, such as drinking alcohol.
- Rolling with resistance – As resistance of some kind will exist. MET encourages that the therapist "roll with" these resistances, "with a goal of shifting clients perceptions". Rather than therapists providing solutions, they are usually "evoked from the client".
- Support self-efficacy – Self-efficacy is defined as the way people view their own competence and achieve their own goals. Therapists encourage clients to realize they are capable of many things, including having the strength to give up alcohol.

== Sources ==
- Miller, W. R. (2000) Motivational Enhancement Therapy: Description of Counseling Approach. in Boren, J. J. Onken, L. S., & Carroll, K. M. (Eds.) Approaches to Drug Abuse Counseling, US Department of Health and Human Services; NIH Publication No. 00-4151 edition (2000)
- Miller, W.R. and Rollnick, S. Motivational Interviewing: Preparing People for Change. NY: Guilford Press, 2002. ISBN 1-57230-563-0
- Miller, W.R., Zweben, A., DiClemente, C.C., Rychtarik, R.G. (1994) 'Motivational Enhancement Therapy Manual. Washington, DC:National Institute on Alcohol Abuse and Alcoholism, Project MATCH Monograph Series, Volume 2. ISBN 978-0-7881-1476-2
- Sussex Publishers. (n.d.). Reality therapy. Psychology Today. https://www.psychologytoday.com/us/therapy-types/reality-therapy
