= PsyMontréal =

PsyMontréal is a psychology services company headquartered in Montreal, Quebec, Canada, with psychologists and mental health professionals offering psychotherapy, coaching, and training services, using empirically based methods such as cognitive behavioral therapy and motivational interviewing.

== Notable contributions ==
PsyMontréal's contribution to Quebec's health care sector consists of being the first to provide trainings to the health care professionals of the Quebec government's "Direction de santé publique" in Motivational Interviewing for the specific purposes of motivating positive health related lifestyle changes. Three Quebec government evaluation reports detail the state of major shifts in the way health care is being delivered in Quebec, with a shift away from intervention (i.e. waiting for somebody to get sick before entry to health care services), to the prevention of illnesses (motivating the population of Quebec to modify their lifestyles by eating better, exercising more, and stopping to smoke). The reports explain the government's prevention strategy and the key use of Motivational Interviewing (supported by the training and consulting services of PsyMontreal) over the years, based on scientifically based best practices. By 2014, the mental health departments of most CSSS of Quebec had adopted Motivational Interviewing through the trainings offered by PsyMontreal. The Motivational Interviewing trainings offered by PsyMontreal also guided the elaboration of the VirTele (Virtual reality & telerehabilitation) intervention elaborated by Dorra Rakia Allegue of the University of Montreal's Faculty of Medecine

In addition to providing the trainings, PsyMontréal itself has notably contributed to the knowledge base of Quebec health care professionals in the use of Motivational interviewing, as the trainers of PsyMontreal has had many articles (all related to the use of Motivational Interviewing to promote healthy lifestyle changes) published in various scientific and professional journals, including the official journals of Quebec's professional Orders of Psychologists, of Respiratory Specialists, of Nurses, and the official journal of the Canadian Thoracic Society.

PsyMontréal trainings were the subject of a RDI Santé television news program (the medical and health program of the Réseau de l'information news channel.

Members of PsyMontréal have also been interviewed about how Motivational Interviewing trainings are helpful to different members of professional orders in Quebec, as well as about the benefits of methods used by PsyMontreal, such as mindfulness meditation, teletherapy, behavioural interventions, encouraging social support and empirically validated online depression and anxiety questionnaires.
