= Boomerang effect =

Boomerang effect may refer to:

- Boomerang effect (psychology) in social psychology
- Imperial boomerang in sociology and political science
- Unintended consequences in general
