= Nothing Happens (anti-drug PSA) =

Anti-cannabis public service announcement in the United States

"Nothing Happens", also called "Nothing can happen to you, too", or "Marijuana can make nothing happen to you, too", was an anti-cannabis public service announcement created by the United States Office of National Drug Control Policy (ONDCP).

== Description ==
The black-and-white PSA shows two friends sharing a joint in a dark room with a single window backlighting them. The room turns out to belong to one of the friends' parents, in their house where the friends have lived for "what, fifteen years?" one of them guesses. One friend sarcastically says to the other "Marijuana can mess you up," and asks if he means it makes you "get into other drugs and start mugging people." The interlocutor answers "Nah, I didn't do anything. In fact, I'd say I'm exactly the same as when I smoked my first joint." An off-screen voice is heard to say "Eddie, did you even look for a job today?" to which he replies "No, ma." while quickly trying to conceal evidence of drug use. The scene fades out and the words "Nothing happens with marijuana" appear above "Partnership for a Drug-Free America" with a voice-over "Marijuana can make nothing happen to you, too." (Note: Details from Wagner and Sundar 2008, Appendix A)

== Academic research ==
The campaign is notable for having been assessed in a 1999 controlled media research study, followed up by further research in 2008, to be a specific example of a PSA that actually increased teen use of cannabis by showing that it is "healthy experimentation, interesting to try, fun, and normal". (Note: The study used The Simpsons episode "Simpsoncalifragilisticexpiala(Annoyed Grunt)cious" as a masking stimulus, with variable PSAs played during breaks "in order to avoid participants recalling" the PSA used.) Other ONDCP public service announcements are said by researchers to have had the same boomerang effect on cannabis consumption. A review of the 1999 study stated:

Exposure to the PSAs (versus control messages) reduced the perceived risk of drug use and increased curiosity to use marijuana. Youth may have misinterpreted ... the tagline "marijuana can make nothing happen to you, too" ... literally.

— Ratneshwar and Mick, 2005

== Other reactions ==
Author Tamim Ansary cited the ad, withdrawn from television "right away", as a counterpoint to anti-drug propaganda when educating his own children.
