= Motivational therapy =

Treatment for substance abuse

Motivational therapy (or MT) is a combination of humanistic treatment and enhanced cognitive-behavioral strategies, designed to treat substance use disorders. It is similar to motivational interviewing and motivational enhancement therapy.

== Method ==
The focus of motivational therapy is to encourage a patient to develop a negative view of their substance use (contemplation), along with a desire to change their behavior (determination to change). A motivational therapist does not explicitly advocate change and tends to avoid directly contradicting their patient, but instead expresses empathy, rolls with resistance, and supports self-efficacy. Relapses in addictive behaviors are part of the treatment and are not considered a step back or a failure to advance in treatment.

Often, a methadone or similar program is used in conjunction with motivational therapy.

Some suggest that the success of motivational therapy is highly dependent on the quality of the therapist involved and, like all therapies, has no guaranteed result. Others explain the frequent successes of motivational therapy by noting that the patient is the ultimate source of change, choosing to reduce their dependency on drugs.

Motivational therapies are focused specifically on a person's needs, or on what their problems may be. The duration of the first session is typically short, but may lengthen over the following sessions. During these sessions there are different methods and techniques used by the therapist. Techniques consist of:

- brief solution focused therapy
- cognitive behavioural therapy
- schema focused therapy
- interpersonal therapy
- compassion focused therapy
- compassionate mind training
- hypnosis.

== History ==
First publicized by Miller and Rollnick in 1991, motivational therapy is now seen as a highly effective treatment strategy for substance use disorders, especially in the case of opiate and euphoric-enhancement drugs, where users tend to resist traditional negative reinforcement strategies. Motivational Therapy was brought to public awareness by William Miller in a 1983 article published in Behavioural Psychotherapy. In 1991, Miller and Stephen Rollnick expanded on the fundamental approaches and concepts, while making more detailed descriptions of procedures in the clinical setting. He later defined it as a directive, client-centered counseling style for eliciting behavior change by helping clients to explore and resolve ambivalence. Compared with non-directive counseling, Motivational Therapy is more focused and goal-directed. The examination and resolution of ambivalence is its central purpose, and the counselor is intentionally directive in pursuing this goal. Since Miller and Rollnick, other psychologists have introduced models and various techniques to try to implement within the Motivational Therapy realm to help with substance use. Carlo DiClemente introduced models that linked motivation with change, proposing the Stages of Change Model, and using it to explain relapse, and the struggle of addiction being a matter of behavior change. The model states seven different stages of change, and a brief description of each stage:

Precontemplation
Not ready to change
Contemplation
Thinking about change
Preparation
Getting ready to make a change, planning and commitment
Action
Making the change, implementing the plan, taking the action
Maintenance
Sustaining behavior change until integrated into lifestyle, maintaining, integrating
Relapse/recycling
Slipping back to previous behavior and re-entering the cycle of change
Termination
Leaving the cycle of change

The models, along with the techniques formulated by Rollnick and Miller have helped create a client-driven form of therapy that has been known to help clients with substance use and different caliber athletes in achieving success. Motivational Therapy was designed to be less confrontational than other therapies that encourage clients to realize that they have a problem that they need to confront in order to change. MT is different from those therapies that:

- Argue that the person has a problem and needs to change
- Offer direct advice or prescribes solutions to the problem without the person's permission or without actively encouraging the person to make his or her own choices
- Use an authoritative/expert stance leaving the client in a passive role
- Do most of the talking, or functions as a unidirectional information delivery system
- Impose a diagnostic label
- Behave in a punitive or coercive manner

The aforementioned therapy techniques are known to violate the essential spirit of motivational therapy. MT is designed to be an interpersonal style of therapy that is not restricted to formal counseling settings. It focuses on the understanding of what initiates change while utilizing a guiding philosophy, and fosters a balance of components that are both directed and client-centered.

== Intervention ==
Motivational intervention is described as a directive, patient-centered counseling style that enhances motivation for change by helping patients clarify and resolve ambivalence about behavior change.

This type of therapy helps patients refocus on their goals in life and restructure the important things in their life.

Motivational problems are increasing in addiction treatment settings, as more patients are identified by early interventions, and are court-ordered, ambivalent, and unmotivated. The earlier the intervention occurs, the less the motivation.

Early intervention allows people to set realistic goals for their recovery. Recovery can take a while, so it is ideal that the patients receives the therapy as soon as possible. the sooner the better because it allows the patients to have confidence in the recovery process and the help that they are receiving.

One of the most motivational to change interventions and evidence based were the principles of the Transtheorical Model of Prochaska & Diclemente (1983).

== Substance use disorders ==
Motivational therapy is not only helpful to the person using substances but also helpful towards their family as well. There has been an equally growing understanding and concern not only for people who use substances but also for their family and friends. Current literature assessments have consistently identified three main findings: (1) involvement of family members during the pre-treatment phase significantly improves engagement of people who use substances in treatment; (2) involvement of the family also improves retention in treatment, and (3) long-term outcomes are more positive when families and/or social networks are components of the treatment approach. Within motivational therapy, specific models have been introduced relating to various reasons for treatment. The Systematic Motivational Therapy (SMT) Model is used for treatment of substance use. The emphasis of this model is the focus on family relationships. This model does not only show the happiness and appreciation of the family in these relationships but also the complications and ambivalent relationships that comes with substance use. There are two distinct versions of the SMT model. Version one of the model includes the family approach towards substance use; emphasizing four different principles: assessment, detoxification, relapse prevention, and rehabilitation. When being addressed, the entire family is present and attentive. Version 2 of the SMT model uses motivational interviewing approaches and combines these with family systems by using five basic principles that are critical in shaping therapist behavior: expressing empathy about the patients condition(s), developing discrepancies regarding the patients beliefs about his or her behavior, avoiding arguments about continued substance use; rolling with resistance to change and supporting patient self-efficacy regarding decisions about behavior change.

== Differences from other therapies ==
Although very often used in similar contexts, motivational therapy, motivational interviewing and motivational enhancement theory/therapy have their differences.

Motivational interviewing (MI) is similar to motivational therapy in the sense that it attempts not to create change within an individual but give foundation and support to the change the individual finds within him or her self. As a treatment for individuals with all types of substance use disorders, motivational interview therapists focus on trying to erase any type of ambivalence the individual may have towards their use. Similar to MET, motivational interviewing finds 'change talk' very important and the clinician interacts with the patient through open-ended questions, affirmations, reflections, and summaries. There are three key elements that build the foundation of motivational interviewing; collaboration, evocation and autonomy. Evocation is expressed through the clinician's responsibility to "draw out" the opinions and commitment to change of the client, rather than suggesting or imposing ideas. The client and the therapist, through collaboration, work together to build a trusting relationship, as opposed to the therapist taking the expert or higher role between the two.

While Motivational Therapy is a method to treat substance use, Motivational Enhancement Therapy (MET) is also a very common way to treat alcohol use disorder. MET is very focused on the individual or patient taking responsibility for their use and speaking about the actions needed to evoke change in their life. Through this therapy, patients learn alternative routes to deal with such a huge change in their lifestyle. Similar to MT, therapists attempt throughout MET to evoke a feeling of optimism within patients, but unlike motivational therapy, therapists are very clear on their advice and suggestions for change. Without taking the back seat and just listening to their patients' thoughts, therapists of MET are more vocal in their feedback towards patient improvement. Like MT, there are five stages which set the stage for successful MET (in order, from beginning to end): Pre-contemplation, contemplation, determination, action, maintenance. If not permanently successful, there becomes a sixth stage to work through – relapse.
