= Alcoholism in adolescence =

Alcoholism in adolescence, though less common than in adults, presents a unique set of dangers due to the developing brain's vulnerability to alcohol's effects. Alcohol can cause damage to a person's DNA. "Alcohol consumption is recognized worldwide as a leading risk factor for disease, disability, and death" and is rated as the most used substance by adolescents. Adolescence is a transitional stage of physical and psychological changes, usually a time in a person life in which they go through puberty. Combining these transitional stages and the intake of alcohol can leave a number of consequences for an adolescent.

== Consequences of alcohol use disorder throughout adolescence ==
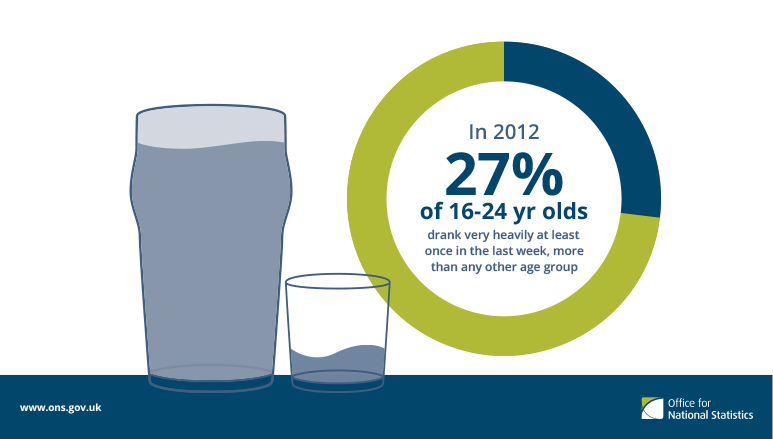
In 2012, 27% of UK 16- to 24-year-olds drank very heavily at least once in the last week, more than any other age group.

Most research is based on alcohol and the effects on people in general, essentially relating to adults. Little to no research is shown on the intake of alcohol throughout adolescents and the consequences that binge drinking from a young age can create. "The rate of alcohol use increases sharply between the ages of 12 and 21 years, and adolescents frequently adopt a binge-like drinking pattern". These patterns can then lead to various consequences including automobile accidents, substance use disorders, sexual activity, skipping school and failing grades. "Recent studies show that alcohol consumption has the potential to trigger long-term biological changes that may have detrimental effects on the developing adolescent brain, including neurocognitive impairment." The effects of alcohol use in adolescents do not just stop at substance abuse disorders and bad behavior; the brain is also highly affected. Researchers have found that adolescents with a history of binge drinking and substance abuse disorder have decreased growth in their frontal lobe, hippocampus, amygdala, and corpus collosum development.

Underaged drinking can cause higher risks for depression, anxiety, and low self-esteem. If a person is going through puberty, it can also cause changes in their hormones. It can also disrupt growth and puberty, and if too much alcohol is consumed, it can cause death from injury or alcohol poisoning. It also damages the brain, which can cause behavioral changes, sleep deprivation, permanent damage to memory, and eventually affect academic performance. It can also lead to increased sexual behavior, and could also lead to sexually transmitted infections, unwanted pregnancy, and sexual assault or rape. It is also a significant risk factor for car accidents, falls or drowning, suicide, violence and homicide, being a victim of a violent crime, and many more accidents that affect underage drinkers. If a child drinks, they have a better chance of being an alcoholic when they are older. That means they might get drunk, be involved in more accidents, and get into trouble with the law, family, friends, schools, and love interests. Because of all of these effects, researchers found that underage drinking causes 5,000 deaths a year: 1,900 by motor vehicle, 1,600 involving homicides, and 300 from suicides.

== Reason for occurrence ==
Marquis states "Adolescent alcohol use is not an acceptable rite of passage but a serious threat to adolescent development and health, as the statistics related to adolescent impairment, injury, and death attest." Research shows how an adolescent makes the decision to consume alcohol because they are influenced by various factors. "These factors include normal maturational changes that all adolescents experience; genetic, psychological and social factors specific to each adolescent and the various social and cultural environments that surround adolescent, including their families, schools and communities". It is also shown that early onset of alcohol intake can lead to high levels of alcohol use in adulthood. Alcoholism throughout adolescents is increasing yearly for a number of different reasons. These reasons include:

- Availability of alcohol
- Peer pressure
- Role model
- Television
- Anxiety or stress

== Prevention ==
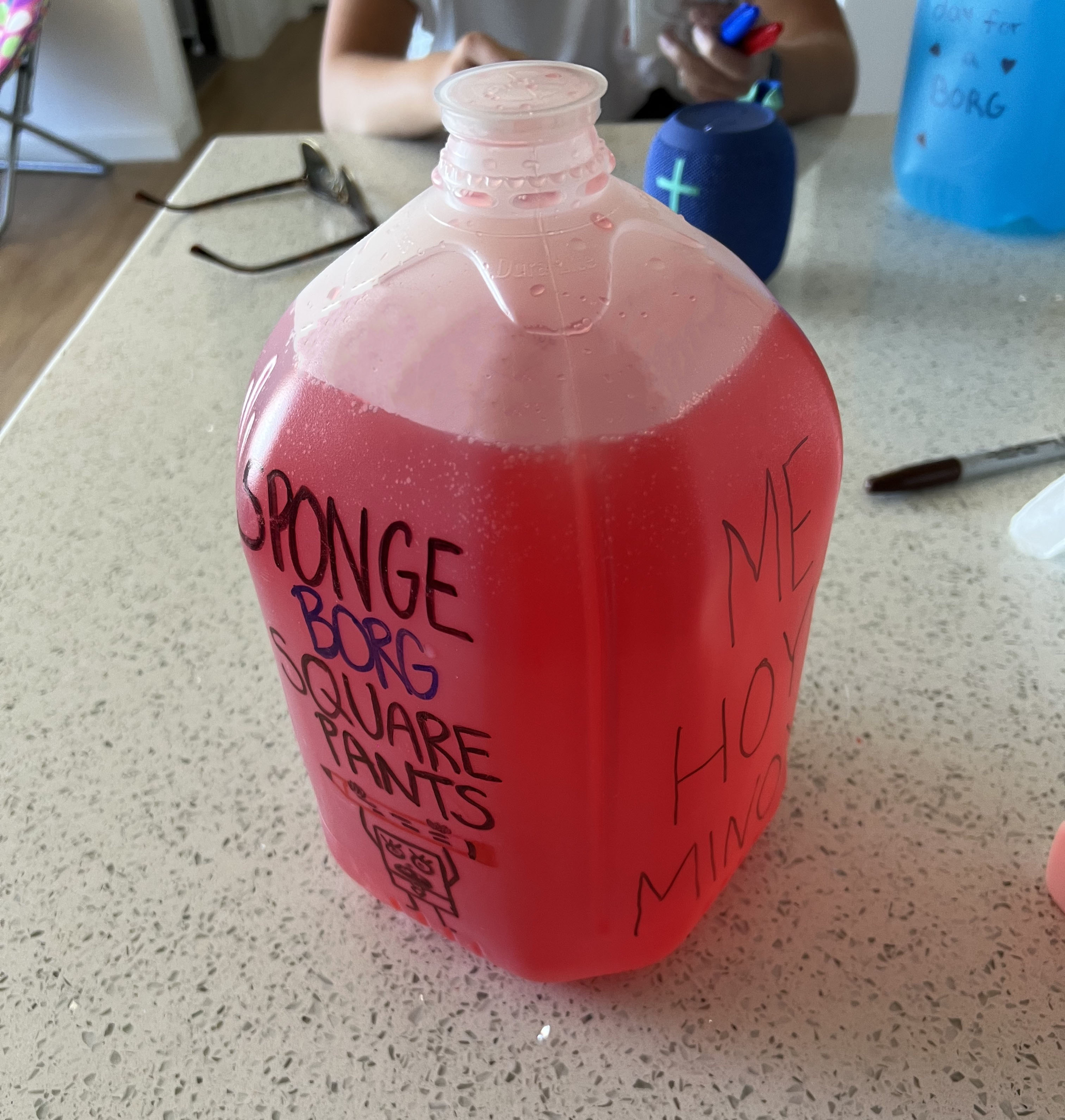
Experts and governments have warned and discouraged a few alcoholic beverages including caffeinated alcoholic drinks, alcopop, and borg (pictured), that often makes young people binge drink.

There are a number of ways to preventing alcohol use disorder throughout adolescents. One of the main ways to do this is to "Promote an understanding of underage alcohol consumption in the context of human development and maturation that takes into account individual adolescent characteristics as well as environmental, ethic, cultural and gender differences". Another way to prevent underage drinking is reducing the cultural forces which encourage and support underage drinking, preventing adolescents from consuming alcohol in a culture in which adolescents feel that it is acceptable. Another important component to preventing alcohol use disorder throughout adolescence is the responsibility of the government, to send a message to underage drinkers informing them how themselves and the rest of society strongly disapprove underage alcohol use because of the severe consequences it can cause and that it will not be tolerated.

=== Legal drinking age ===
Minimum legal age to purchase alcohol by country (2021): Minimum age is 21 Minimum age is 20 Minimum age is 19 Minimum age is 18 Minimum age is 17 Minimum age is 16 No regulation/no age set

A legal drinking age for the buying or consuming of alcohol is in place in many of the world's countries, typically with the intent to protect the young from alcohol-related harm. This age varies between countries; for example, the legal drinking age for Australia is 18, whereas the legal drinking age in the United States is 21.

== See also ==
- Adolescence
- Short-term effects of alcohol consumption
- Long-term effects of alcohol consumption
