= Boomerang effect (psychology) =

Unintended effect of persuasion

In social psychology, the boomerang effect, also known as "psychological reactance", refers to the unintended consequences of an attempt to persuade resulting in the adoption of an opposing position instead. It is sometimes also referred to as "the theory of psychological reactance", stating that attempts to restrict a person's freedom often produce an "anticonformity boomerang effect". In other words, the boomerang effect is a situation where people tend to pick the opposite of what something or someone is saying or doing because of how it is presented to them. Typically, the more aggressively a position is presented to someone, the more likely they are to adopt an opposing view.

== Conditions and explanations ==
=== Early recognition ===
Hovland, Janis and Kelly first recorded and named the boomerang effect in 1953, noting that it is more likely under certain conditions:

- When weak arguments are paired with a negative source.
- When weak or unclear persuasion leads the recipient to believe that the communicator is propounding a different position to that which the communicator really intends.
- When the persuasion triggers aggression or unalleviated emotional arousal.
- When the communication adds to the recipient's knowledge of the norms and increases their conformity.
- When non-conformity to their own group results in feelings of guilt or social punishment.
- When the communicator's position is too far from the recipient's position and thus produces a "contrast" effect and thus enhances their original attitudes.

Later in 1957, Hovland, Sherif and Harvey further discussed the necessity of understanding these unintended attitude changes in persuasion communication and suggested possible approaches for analysis via underlying motivational processes, psychophysical stimuli, as well as ego-involving verbal material. Jack Brehm and Arthur Cohen were among the first to provide theoretical explanations.

Jack Brehm first raised attention to the phenomenon a fait accompli that might conceivably create dissonance if an event has led to the opposite behavior predicted at a prior point. He conducted an experiment to examine the behaviors of eighth graders eating a disliked vegetable. About half of them were told that their parents would be informed on the vegetable they ate. Then liking the vegetable was measured before and after the procedure. The results show that for kids who indicated little or no discrepancy between serving and actually eating the disliked vegetable at home, they should experience little or no dissonance in liking the vegetable from the low to the high consequence condition. They thereby concluded that the greater was the individual's initial dislike, the greater was the pressure produced by the experiment to increase his liking. In Jack Brehm's experiment it shows how even at a young age we are greatly impacted by the boomerang effect and it can have positive or negative outcomes that come with it. There was also larger resistance to change the attitude when the initial attitude was more extreme. However, they argued that in this experiment, the pressure to reduce dissonance increased more rapidly with increasing discrepancy than did the resistance against change, which verified Festinger's cognitive dissonance theory.

In a follow-up, Sensenig and Brehm focused on the boomerang effect in experiments and applied Brehm's psychological reactance theory to explain the unintended attitudinal change.

=== Psychological reactance theory analysis ===
Sensenig & Brehm applied Brehm's reactance theory to explain the boomerang effect. They argued that when a person thinks that his freedom to support a position on attitude issue is eliminated, the psychological reactance will be aroused and then he consequently moves his attitudinal position in a way so as to restore the lost freedom. He told college students to write an essay supporting one side of five issues and led some of them believe that their persuasive essays might influence the decision on those issues. Therefore, the people who had the impression that their preference was taken into account in the decision regarding which side they would support on the 1st issue showed attitude change in favor of the preferred position, while others who are concerned with their freedom lost move toward the intended position held by the communicator.

This experiment resulted in various links in the chain of reasoning: (a) when a person's freedom is threatened, his motivational state will move toward restoration of the threatened freedom; (b) the greater the implied threatened freedoms, the greater the tendency to restore the threatened freedom will be; (c) the reestablishment of freedom may take the form of moving one's attitudinal position away from the position forced by others.

Jack Brehm and Sharon Brehm later developed psychological reactance theory and discussed its applications. They also listed a series of reactions reactance can evoke in addition to the boomerang effect, which includes but is not limited to related boomerang effect, indirect restoration or vicarious boomerang effects.

=== Cognitive dissonance theory analysis ===
The dissonance theory by Leon Festinger has thrived the progress of social psychology research in the 1960s as it is not confined to the prediction of intended influence but can support almost all sub fields of psychology studies. Although Festinger himself was ambiguous about the role of commitment in the theory, later researchers such as Brehm and Cohen have emphasized its importance in providing a general conceptualization of the boomerang effect.

According to Cohen, dissonance theory can provide not only an explanation, but also a prediction of both the intended and the unintended influence of persuasion communication on attitudinal change. According to Saul McLeod, Cognitive dissonance refers to a situation involving conflicting attitudes, beliefs or behaviors. This produces a feeling of mental discomfort leading to an alteration in one of the attitudes, beliefs or behaviors to reduce the discomfort and restore balance. For example, when people smoke (behavior) and they know that smoking causes cancer (cognition), they are in a state of cognitive dissonance. Showing how the dissonance theory directly correlates to the boomerang effect has made impact on our knowledge of why humans act and can be influenced the way that they are.

In his experiment, he presented factors that can lead to a boomerang effect, while suggesting a broader view of the unintended consequences than simply the case of a response to attempted attitude change. Cohen proposed the following dissonance formulation model for the unintended attitude change by persuasive communication. First, suppose that dissonance aroused in regard to some unspecified cognition. According to Festinger's Cognitive Dissonance Theory, we know the dissonance could be reduced by a change in the cognition. Now suppose the resistance to change is great because the actual event cannot be changed and its meaning is ambiguous (for example, the person is strongly committed to the original cognition position), then the person will resort to other forms to reduce or eliminate the dissonance. In this latter form, one can solve the discrepancy problem through the addition of elements consonant either with the original cognition, in which produced the boomerang effect. Cohen formulated a situation of "mutual boomerang effect", in which the communicator is strongly committed to convince the other person of his attitudinal position by means of a persuasion communication.

Because of this strong original attitude position the communicator holds, Cohen predicts that the more distant the target person's original attitude, the more dissonance will be also experienced by the communicator. The expected "unintended influence" arises when the communicator tried to persuade the other of the worth of his own position by becoming even more extreme in that position. He asked his subjects write a strongly persuasive essay to the partners with an opposite side of attitude on an issue, who are actually confederates. The subjects here thus act as the communicator to bring their partners over to their own sides. The subjects were also asked to rate the partners' likability and friendliness before they read "their partner's essay" returned. Cohen used attitude change of the partners as the manipulation of dissonance where he randomly allocated his subjects into high-dissonance group and low-dissonance group. The results exposed strong boomerang effects for high-dissonance group. He also found out that the response to the likability and friendliness of the partners are relevant. The data showed that the difference between dissonance conditions was largely confined to and exaggerated for those subjects who originally rated their partners to be relatively more likable and friendly.

Cohen's study on boomerang effect has broadened the scope of persuasive communication from merely the recipient's reaction to the persuasive message to the communicator's attempt to influence the target. Dissonance theory suggests that the basic issue is under what conditions a person strengthens his original attitude as a way of reducing some attitudinal inconsistency. Cohen suggested that, one can reduce the dissonance via boomerang when dissonance is created (a) with a strong commitment to convincing the other person, (b) with no anticipation of a further influence attempt, and (c) with no easy chance to repudiate the other person. His results on the likability have strengthened the interpretation as the low-dissonance group who found their partners likable and friendly move toward them in the attitudes more, while likability only increased dissonance for the highs.

In other words, the dissonance can be reduced by becoming more extreme in the original position, thereby increasing the proportion of cognition supporting the initial stand and decreasing the proportion of dissonant cognition.

=== Other analysis ===
Boomerang effect is sometimes also referred to the attribution/attitude boomerang effect. Researchers applied Heider's attribution theory to explain why it would occur. For example, Skowronski, Carlston, Mae, and Crawford demonstrated association-based effects in their study on spontaneous trait transference. Despite that the descriptions of other people are independent of the communicator, simple associative processes link the two together and produce boomerang phenomena.

== Examples of applications ==
=== Consumer behavior ===
Wendlandt and Schrader studied the resistance of consumers against loyalty programs encountered in relationship marketing. They found that contractual bonds provoke reactance effects, social-psychological bonds increased neither reactance nor perceived utility of the program, and economic bonds raised perceived utility to a certain threshold level, from which the reactance effect dominated afterwards.

=== Persuasive health communication ===
Researchers have reported that some public health interventions have produced effects opposite to those intended in health communication such as smoking and alcohol consumption behaviors, and thus have employed various methods to study them under different contexts. Ringold argued that some consumer's negative reactions on alcoholic beverage warnings and education efforts can be explained concisely by Brehm's psychological reactance theory.

Dillard and Shen also emphasized the importance of reactance theory to understand failures in persuasive health communication but argued that there be a measurement problem. They thereby developed four alternative conceptual perspectives on the nature of reactance as well as providing an empirical test of each.

Hyland and Birrell found that a government health warning on cigarette advertisements published in 1979 led to a "boomerang effect" leading to an increase desire to smoke after viewing the campaign. The results of their study indicated that the presence of a more aggressive health warning in an advertisement increased the desire to smoke and it decreased the perceived goodness of the advertisement.

Another negative impact of this effect happens in drug and supplement marketing. Bolton et al. researched how the marketing of health drugs and supplements lead to less healthy life style due to the drugs' marketing reducing risk perceptions and perceived importance of, and motivation to engage in, complementary health-protective behaviors.

In a 2010 study, researchers explored ways to reduce and/or eliminate the boomerang effect. 289 undergraduate students from the University of Georgia participated, and each of them was assigned to a random section of laptop computers, which would play public service announcement videos on different message topics (on drunk-driving and anti-smoking) and with varying levels of empathy present. After watching each of the five public service announcements they were assigned, participants recorded their immediate perceptions, and rated each clip on how much it invoked an emotional response within them. Students recorded their attitude towards the advocacy of each clip, completed a trait empathy scale and stated some demographic information. Results in this study suggested that empathy-induced messages in storytelling seemed to reduce psychological reactance in users, therefore reducing the boomerang effect.

=== Environmental behaviors ===
Mann and Hill investigated the case of litter control and showed that the combination of different positive influence strategies could actually create boomerang effect and increase the amount of littering.

A field experiment in which the normative messages were used to promote household energy conservation found the descriptive message of neighborhood usage created a boomerang effect depending on the high prior household consumption. They also eliminated the boomerang effect by adding an injunctive message about social approval.

Another randomized controlled trial examined water conservation behavior among primary school children in Singapore. The study found that when children were told to limit showers to five minutes, those already showering for less than five minutes increased their shower duration. However, when the message was accompanied by either private or public written pledges, the boomerang effect was neutralized, leading to reduced shower times across the group. The study highlights how commitment devices can mitigate unintended reactance in environmental behavior interventions.

== Related effects ==
- Backfire effect – Maintenance of a belief despite new information that firmly contradicts it
- Sleeper effect – Psychological phenomenon
- Streisand effect – Increased awareness of information after suppression efforts

== See also ==
- Unintended consequences – Unforeseen outcomes of an action
- Imperial boomerang – Concept in political science
- Persuasion – Umbrella term of influence and mode of communication
- Reactance (psychology) – Unpleasant emotion experienced when behavioral freedom is threatened
