= Stephen Rollnick =

South African psychologist

Stephen Rollnick is Honorary Distinguished Professor in the School of Medicine, Cardiff University, Wales, UK. Alongside William R Miller, he developed many of the founding principles of motivational interviewing.

== Biography ==
Professor Stephen Rollnick grew up in Cape Town, South Africa and completed a Masters training in research methods in Strathclyde University in Glasgow (1978) and a professional training in clinical psychology in Cardiff (1983). Since then he has lived and worked there as a clinical psychologist in the National Health Service and more recently, as a member of the Department of General Practice. His early experience as a trainee nurse in a hospital addiction treatment setting led to an interest in constructive methods for helping people resolve difficult behaviour change problems. This has taken him through a close collaboration with Professor William R Miller on the subject of motivational interviewing, a Doctoral thesis (1993) on counselling for excessive drinkers, to more recent work on consultations about lifestyle and medication use in healthcare practice. Through collaboration with Professor Chris Butler and Dr Paul Kinnersley he is now studying broader communication challenges like the antibiotic consultation, and the development and evaluation of methods for helping undergraduates and qualified practitioners change their communication and consulting behaviour.

== Development of motivational interviewing ==
Rollnick developed many fundamental concepts of motivational interviewing with Miller in their 1991 book. Rollnick used his experience in the field of addiction treatment to find ways in which healthcare professionals could combat ambivalence regarding change. The technique has since been adopted by many healthcare professionals in their practice.

== Books ==
- Motivational Interviewing, Third Edition: Helping People Change, ISBN 978-1-60918-227-4.
- Motivational Interviewing in Health Care: Helping Patients Change Behavior, ISBN 978-1-59385-612-0.
- Motivational Interviewing in the Treatment of Psychological Problems, ISBN 978-1-59385-585-7.

== Sources ==
- Steve Rollnick motivational interviewing resources
- Motivational Interviewing Trainer Network
- Miller, W.R. and Rollnick, S. Motivational Interviewing: Preparing People to Change. NY: Guilford Press, 2002.
- Rollnick, Miller and Butler: Motivational Interviewing in Health Care: Helping Patients Change Behavior (Applications of Motivational Interviewing). Guilford Press, 2008.
- Professor Stephen Rollnick research profile on Cardiff University website
