= William Richard Miller =

American psychologist (born 1947)

William Richard Miller (born June 27, 1947) is an American clinical psychologist, an emeritus distinguished professor of psychology and psychiatry at the University of New Mexico in Albuquerque. Miller and Stephen Rollnick are the co-founders of motivational interviewing.

== Education ==
Miller received his Ph.D. in clinical psychology from the University of Oregon in 1976.

== Career ==
Miller is emeritus distinguished professor of psychology and psychiatry and affiliated with the Center on Alcoholism, Substance Abuse, and Addictions (CASAA) at the University of New Mexico (UNM). He joined the UNM faculty in 1976. He has taught a wide range of subjects, including courses on alcoholism and abnormal psychology, and seminars on positive psychology and on self-fulfilling prophecies. His primary scientific interest is in the psychology of change, but his research spans the treatment of addictive behaviors, self-regulation, spirituality and psychology, motivation for change, and pastoral psychology. He has been a visiting scholar at the Oregon Health & Science University, the University of New South Wales in Sydney, Australia, Stanford University, and the University of Bergen and the Hjellestad Clinic in Norway.

=== Motivational interviewing ===
Miller has changed the way clinicians think about the nature of substance use disorders, their treatment and the means to effect change in patients. Early in his career, he emphasized that not all alcohol problems are severe and tested briefer interventions for mid-range problem drinkers. His meta-analysis of the research on treatments of alcohol problems shows a rank ordering of those treatments with the most effective being active and empathic (brief interventions and motivational enhancement), while the least effective are passive (films, lectures) or confrontational. He also demonstrated through controlled experiment that confrontation leads to states of resistance and denial, which many in the addiction field attribute to traits of those with addiction. Motivational interviewing, or motivational enhancement therapy, avoids creating such resistance by avoiding confrontation and eliciting motivation with open-ended questions and empathy.

== Publications ==
- Miller, William R.; Thoresen, Carl E. (January 2003). "Spirituality, religion, and health: An emerging research field". American Psychologist. 58 (1): 24–35. doi:10.1037/0003-066X.58.1.24. PMID 12674816. S2CID 3176180.
- Miller, W.R. Living As If: How positive faith can change your life. Philadelphia: Westminster Press, c 1985.
- Miller, W.R. and Rollnick, S. Motivational Interviewing, Third Edition: Helping People Change. NY: Guilford Press, 2012. ISBN 978-1-60918-227-4.
- Miller, W.R., Zweben, A., DiClemente, C.C., Rychtarik, R.G. 'Motivational Enhancement Therapy Manual. Washington, DC:National Institute on Alcohol Abuse and Alcoholism, Project MATCH Monograph Series, Volume 2.
- Miller, W. R., & Muñoz, R. F. (2005). Controlling Your Drinking: Tools to Make Moderation Work for You. New York: Guilford Press. ISBN 978-1-57230-903-6.
- Miller, W. R., & Delaney, H. D. (Eds.) (2005). Judeo-Christian perspectives on psychology: Human nature, motivation, and change. Washington, DC: American Psychological Association.
- Miller, W. R., & Carroll, K. M. (Eds.) (2006). Rethinking substance abuse: What the science shows and what we should do about it. New York: Guilford Press.
- Miller, W. R., & Baca, J. C. (2001). Quantum Change: When Epiphanies and Sudden Insights Transform Ordinary Lives. New York: Guilford Press. ISBN 978-1-57230-505-2.
- Miller, W. R., & Forcehimes A. A., Zweben, A. (2011). Treating Addiction: A Guide for Professionals. New York: Guilford Press. ISBN 978-1-60918-638-8.
- Miller, William R., ed. (1999). Integrating spirituality into treatment : resources for practitioners. Washington, DC: American Psychological Association. ISBN 1557985812. OCLC 40948408.
