= Motivational interviewing =

Approach to psychological counseling

Motivational interviewing (MI) is a counseling approach developed in part by clinical psychologists William R. Miller and Stephen Rollnick. It is a directive, client-centered counseling style for eliciting behavior change by helping clients to explore and resolve ambivalence. Compared with non-directive counseling, it is more focused and goal-directed, and departs from traditional Rogerian client-centered therapy through this use of direction, in which therapists attempt to influence clients to consider making changes, rather than engaging in non-directive therapeutic exploration. The examination and resolution of ambivalence is a central purpose, and the counselor is intentionally directive in pursuing this goal. MI is most centrally defined not by technique but by its spirit as a facilitative style for interpersonal relationship.

Core concepts evolved from experience in the treatment of problem drinkers, and MI was first described by Miller (1983) in an article published in the journal Behavioural and Cognitive Psychotherapy. Miller and Rollnick elaborated on these fundamental concepts and approaches in 1991 in a more detailed description of clinical procedures. MI has demonstrated positive effects on psychological and physiological disorders according to meta-analyses.

== Overview ==
Motivational interviewing (MI) is a person-centered strategy. It is used to elicit patient motivation to change a specific negative behavior. MI engages clients, elicits change talk and evokes patient motivation to make positive changes. Change talk refers to statements made by clients that express desire, ability, reasons, or need for change. For example, change talk can be elicited by asking the patient questions such as: "How might you like things to be different?" or "How does ______ interfere with things that you would like to do?"

Unlike clinical interventions and treatment, MI is the technique where the interviewer (clinician) assists the interviewee (patient) in changing a behavior by expressing their acceptance of the interviewee without judgement. By this, MI incorporates the idea that every single patient may be in differing stages of readiness levels and may need to act accordingly to the patient's levels and current needs. Change may occur quickly or may take considerable time, depending on the client. Knowledge alone is usually not sufficient to motivate change within a client, and challenges in maintaining change should be thought of as the rule, not the exception. The incorporation of MI can help patients resolve their uncertainties and hesitancies that may stop them from their inherent want of change in relation to a certain behavior or habit. At the same time, it can be seen that MI ensures that the participants are viewed more as team members to solve a problem rather than a clinician and patient. Hence, this technique can be attributed to a collaboration that respects sense of self and autonomy.

To be more successful at motivational interviewing, a clinician must have a strong sense of "purpose, clear strategies and skills for such purposes". This ensures that the clinician knows what goals they are trying to achieve prior to entering into motivational interviewing. Additionally, clinicians need to have well-rounded and established interaction skills including asking open ended questions, reflective listening, affirming and reiterating statements back to the patient. Such skills are used in a dynamic where the clinician actively listens to the patient then repackages their statements back to them while highlighting what they have done well. In this way, it can improve their self-confidence for change.

Furthermore, at the same time the clinician needs to keep in mind the following five principles when practicing MI.

=== Express empathy ===
This means to listen and express empathy to patients through the use of reflective listening. In this step, the clinician listens and presents ideas the patient has discussed in a different way, rather than telling the patient what to do. This hopes to ensure that the patient feels respected and that there are no judgments given when they express their thoughts, feelings and experiences but instead, shows the patient that the clinician is genuinely interested about the patient and their circumstances. This aims to strengthen the relationship between the two parties and ensures it is a collaboration, and allows the patient to feel that the clinician is supportive and therefore will be more willing to be open about their real thoughts.

=== Develop discrepancy ===
This means to assist patients in developing discrepancies between the current self and what they want to be like in the future after a change has taken place. The main goal of this principle is to increase the patient's awareness that there are consequences to their current behaviors. This allows the patient to realize the negative aspects and issues caused by the particular behavior that MI is trying to change. This realization can help and encourage the patient towards a dedication to change as they can see the discrepancy between their current behavior and desired behavior. It is important that the patient be the one making the arguments for change and realize their discrepancies themselves. An effective way to do this is for the clinician to participate in active reflective listening and repacking what the patient has told them and delivering it back to them.

=== Avoid arguments ===
During the course of MI the clinician may be inclined to argue with a patient, especially when they are ambivalent about their change and this is especially true when "resistance" is met from the patient. If the clinician tries to enforce a change, it could exacerbate the patient to become more withdrawn and can cause degeneration of what progress had been made thus far and decrease rapport with the patient. Arguments can cause the patient to become defensive and draw away from the clinician which is counterproductive and diminishes any progress that may have been made. When patients become a little defensive and argumentative, it usually is a sign to change the plan of attack. The biggest progress made towards behavior change is when the patient makes their own arguments instead of the clinician presenting it to them.

=== Roll with resistance ===
"Rolling with resistance" is now an outdated concept in MI; in the third edition of Miller & Rollnick's textbook Motivational Interviewing: Helping People Change, the authors indicated that they had completely abandoned the word "resistance" as well as the term "rolling with resistance", due to the term's tendency to blame the client for problems in the therapy process and obscure different aspects of ambivalence. "Resistance", as the idea was previously conceptualized before it was abandoned in MI, can come in many forms such as arguing, interrupting, denying and ignoring. Part of successful MI is to approach the "resistance" with professionalism, in a way that is non-judgmental and allows the patient to once again affirm and know that they have their autonomy and that it is their choice when it comes to their change.

=== Support self-efficacy ===
Strong self-efficacy can be a significant predictor of success in behavior change. In many patients there is an issue of the lack of self-efficacy. They may have tried multiple times on their own to create a change in their behavior (e.g. trying to cease smoking, losing weight, sleep earlier) and because they have failed it causes them to lose their confidence and hence lowers their self-efficacy. Therefore, it is clear to see how important it is for the patient to believe that they are self-efficacious and it is the clinician's role to support them by means of good MI practice and reflective listening. By reflecting on what the patient had told them, the clinician can accentuate the patient's strengths and what they have been successful in (e.g. commending a patient who had stopped smoking for a week instead of straining on the fact they failed). By highlighting and suggesting to the patient areas in which they have been successful, this can be incorporated into future attempts and can improve their confidence and efficacy to believe that they are capable of change.

While there are as many differences in technique, the underlying spirit of the method remains the same and can be characterized in a few key points:

1. Motivation to change is elicited from the client, and is not imposed from outside forces.
2. It is the client's task, not the counsellor's, to articulate and resolve the client's ambivalence.
3. Direct persuasion is not an effective method for resolving ambivalence.
4. The counselling style is generally quiet and elicits information from the client.
5. The counsellor is directive, in that they help the client to examine and resolve ambivalence.
6. Readiness to change is not a trait of the client, but a fluctuating result of interpersonal interaction.
7. The therapeutic relationship resembles a partnership or companionship.

Ultimately, practitioners must recognize that motivational interviewing involves collaboration not confrontation, evocation not education, autonomy rather than authority, and exploration instead of explanation. Effective processes for positive change focus on goals that are small, important to the client, specific, realistic, and oriented in the present and/or future.

== Four processes ==
There are four steps used in motivational interviewing. These help to build trust and connection between the patient and the clinician, focus on areas that may need to be changed and find out the reasons the patient may have for changing or holding onto a behavior. This helps the clinician to support and assist the patient in their decision to change their behavior and plan steps to reach this behavioral change. These steps do not always happen in this order.

=== Engaging ===
In this step, the clinician gets to know the patient and understands what is going on in the patient's life. The patient needs to feel comfortable, listened to and fully understood from their own point of view. This helps to build trust with the patient and builds a relationship where they will work together to achieve a shared goal. The clinician must listen and show empathy without trying to fix the problem or make a judgement. This allows the patient to open up about their reasons for change, hopes, expectations as well as the barriers and fears that are stopping the patient from changing. The clinician must ask open ended questions which helps the patient to give more information about their situation, so they feel in control and that they are participating in the decision-making process and the decisions are not being made for them. This creates an environment that is comfortable for the patient to talk about change. The more trust the patient has towards the clinician, the more likely it is reduce resistance, defensiveness, embarrassment or anger the patient may feel when talking about a behavioural issue. Overall, the patient is more likely to come back to follow up appointments, follow an agreed plan and get the benefit of the treatment.

=== Focusing ===
This is where the clinician helps the patient find and focus on an area that is important to them, where they are unsure or are struggling to make a change. This step is also known as the "WHAT?" of change. The goal is for the clinician to understand what is important to the patient without pushing their own ideas on the patient. The clinician needs to ask questions to understand the reasons if and why the patient would be motivated to change and choose a goal to reach together. The patient must feel that they share the control with the clinician about the direction and agree on a goal. The clinician will then aim to help the patient order the importance of their goals and point out the current behaviors that get in the way of achieving their new goal or "develop discrepancy" between their current and desired behaviors. The focus or goal can come from the patient, situation or the clinician. There are three styles of focusing; directing, where the clinician can direct the patient towards a particular area for change; following, where the clinician let the patient decide the goal and be led by the patient's priorities, and; guiding, where the clinician leads the patient to uncover an area of importance.

=== Evoking ===
In this step the clinician asks questions to get the patient to open up about their reasons for change. This step is also known as the "WHY?" of change. Often when a patient puts this into words it reinforces their reasons to change and they find out they have more reasons to change rather than to stay the same. Usually, there is one reason that is stronger than the others to motivate the patient to change their behavior. The clinician needs to listen and recognise "change talk", where the patient is uncovering how they would go about change and are coming up with their own solutions to their problems. The clinician should support and encourage the patient when they talk about ways and strategies to change, as the patient is more likely to follow a plan they set for themselves. When the patient is negative or is resisting change the clinician should "roll with resistance" where they don't affirm or encourage the negative points but highlight the ways and reasons the person has come up with to change. The clinician must resist arguing or the "righting reflex" where they want to fix the problem or challenge the patient's negative thoughts. This comes across as they are not working together and causes the patient to resist change even more. The clinician's role is to ask questions that guide the patient to come up with their own solution to change. The best time to give advice is if the patient asks for it, if the patient is stuck with coming up with ideas, the clinician can ask permission to give advice and then give details, but only after the patient has come up with their own ideas first. If the clinician focuses more on their own reasons they believe the patient should change this would not come across as genuine to the patient and this would reduce the bond they made in the engaging process.

=== Planning ===
In this step the clinician helps the patient in planning how to change their behavior and encourages their commitment to change. This step is also known as the "HOW?" of change. The clinician asks questions to judge how ready the patient is to change and helps to guide the patient in coming up with their own step by step action plan. They can help to strengthen the patient's commitment to changing, by supporting and encouraging when the patient uses "commitment talk" or words that show their commitment to change. In this step the clinician can listen and recognize areas that may need more work to get to the core motivation to change or help the patient to overcome uneasiness that is still blocking their behavioral change. In doing this, they help to strengthen the patients motivation and support that they are capable of achieving this goal on their own. The clinician should help the patient to come up with SMART goals which are; Specific, Measurable, Achievable, Relevant and Time bound. This helps to set benchmarks and measure how their behavior has changed towards their new goal.

== Adaptations ==
=== Motivational enhancement therapy ===
Motivational enhancement therapy is a time-limited four-session adaptation used in Project MATCH, a US-government-funded study of treatment for alcohol problems and the Drinkers' Check-up, which provides normative-based feedback and explores client motivation to change in light of the feedback.

Motivational interviewing is supported by over 200 randomized controlled trials across a range of target populations and behaviors including substance use disorders, health-promotion behaviours, medical adherence, and mental health issues.

=== Pre-contemplation ===
Motivational Interviewing with individuals in the pre-contemplation stage of the stages of change represent a use case in which Motivational Interviewing processes excel beyond other methods. If the patient/client/individual is in this stage, they may not be consciously aware of, accepting of, or consider they have a problem. Motivational interviewers in this situation are trained to use processes like rolling with resistance which reduces a client's need to repeat and reframe their own sustain talk. Additionally Motivational Interviewing adapts to this stage by adapting the *change target*. Clients starting in pre-contemplation stage of change are unlikely to jump 3 steps to the action stage of change. By adapting the change target talented Motivational Interviewers can help clients to advance 1 stage of change into the "contemplation stage".

=== Motivational interviewing groups ===
MI groups are highly interactive, focused on positive change, and harness group processes for evoking and supporting positive change. They are delivered in four phases:

1. Engaging the group
2. Evoking member perspectives
3. Broadening perspectives and building momentum for change
4. Moving into action

=== Behaviour Change Counselling (BCC) ===
Behaviour change counselling (BCC) is an adaptation of MI which focuses on promoting behavior change in a healthcare setting using brief consultations. BCC's main goal is to understand the patient's point of view, how they're feeling and their idea of change. It was created with a "more modest goal in mind", as it simply aims to "help the person talk through the why and how of change" and encourage behavior change. It focuses on patient-centered care and is based on several overlapping principles of MI, such as respect for patient choice, asking open-ended questions, empathetic listening and summarizing. Multiple behavior change counselling tools were developed to assess and scale the effectiveness of behaviour change counselling in promoting behavior change such as the Behaviour Change Counselling Index (BECCI) and the Behaviour Change Counselling Scale (BCCS).

=== Behaviour Change Counselling Scale (BCCS) ===
The Behaviour Change Counselling Scale (BCCS) is a tool used to assess lifestyle counselling using BCC, focusing on feedback on the skill achieved. "Items of BCCS were scored on 1-7 Likert scales and items were tallied into 4 sub-scales, reflecting the 3 skill-sets: MI and readiness assessment, behavior modification, and emotion management". The data obtained is then presented on: item characteristics, sub-scale characteristics, interrater reliability, test-retest reliability and construct validity. Based on a study conducted by Vallis, the results suggest that BCCS is a potentially useful tool in assessing BCC and aid to training practitioners as well as assessing training outcomes.

=== Behaviour Change Counselling Index (BECCI) ===
The Behaviour Change Counselling Index (BECCI) is a BCC tool that assesses general practitioner behavior and incites behavior change through talking about change, encouraging the patient to think about change and respecting the patient's choices in regards to behavior change. BECCI was developed to assess a practitioner's competence in the use of Behaviour Change Counselling (BCC) methods to elicit behavior change. Used primarily for the use of learning practitioners in a simulated environment to practice and learn the skills of BCC. It "provides valuable information about the standard of BCC that practitioners were trained to deliver in studies of BCC as an intervention". Rather than the result and response from the patient, the tool emphasizes and measures the practitioner's behaviors, skills and attitude. Results from the study show that after receiving training in BCC, practitioners show great improvement based on BECCI. However, as BECCI has only been used in a simulated clinical environment, more study is required to assess its reliability in a real patient environment. Furthermore, it focuses heavily on practitioner behavior rather than patient behavior. Therefore, BECCI may be useful for trainers to assess the reliability and effectiveness of BCC skills but further research and use is required, especially in a real consultation environment.

=== Technology Assisted Motivational Interview (TAMI) ===
Technology Assisted Motivational Interview (TAMI) is "used to define adaptations of MI delivered via technology and various types of media". This may include technological devices and creations such as computers, mobile phones, telephones, videos and animations. A review of multiple studies shows the potential effectiveness of the use of technology in delivering motivational interviewing consultations to encourage behavior change. However, some limitations include: the lack of empathy that may be expressed through the use of technology and the lack of face-to-face interaction may either produce a positive or negative effect on the patient. Further studies are required to determine whether face-to-face consultations to deliver MI is more effective in comparison to those delivered via technology. "A 2025 scoping review reported that AI systems delivering motivational interviewing show promise for enhancing patient engagement and scaling behavior change interventions but noted that most systems are in early development and few have been rigorously evaluated."

== Limitations ==
=== Underlying mental health conditions ===
Patients with an underlying mental illness present one such limitation to motivational interviewing. In a case where the patient has an underlying mental illness such as depression, anxiety, bipolar disorder, schizophrenia or other psychosis, more intensive therapy may be required to induce a change. In these instances, the use of motivational interviewing as a technique to treat outward-facing symptoms, such as not brushing teeth, may be ineffective where the root cause of the problem stems from the mental illness. Some of the patients may act like listening to the interviewer just to veil their underlying mental health issue. When working with these patients, it is important to recognize the limitations of behaviorally-focused counseling and motivational interviewing. The treating therapists should, therefore, ensure the patient is referred to the correct medical or psychological professional to address the cause of the behavior, and not simply one of the symptoms.

=== Motivation ===
Professionals attempting to encourage people to make a behavioral change often underestimate the effect of motivation. Simply advising clients how detrimental their current behavior is and providing advice on how to change their behavior will not work if the client lacks motivation. Many people have full knowledge of how dangerous smoking is yet they continue the practice. Research has shown that a client's motivation to alter behavior is largely influenced by the way the therapist relates to them.

=== Therapist/client trust ===
Clients who don't like or trust their health care professionals are likely to become extremely resistant to change. In order to prevent this, the therapist must take time to foster an environment of trust. Even when the therapist can clearly identify the issues at hand it is important that the patient feels the session is collaborative and that they are not being lectured to. Confrontational approaches by therapists will inhibit the process.

=== Time limitations ===
Time limits placed on therapists during consultations also have the potential to impact significantly on the quality of motivational interviewing. Appointments may be limited to a brief or single visit with a patient; for example, a client may attend the dentist with a toothache due to a cavity. The oral health practitioner or dentist may be able to broach the subject of a behavior change, such as flossing or diet modification but the session duration may not be sufficient when coupled with other responsibilities the health practitioner has to the health and wellbeing of the patient. For many clients, changing habits may involve reinforcement and encouragement which is not possible in a single visit. Some patients, once treated, may not return for a number of years or may even change practitioners or practices, meaning the motivational interview is unlikely to have sufficient effect.

=== Training deficiencies ===
While psychologists, mental health counselors, and social workers are generally well trained and practiced in delivering motivational interviewing, other health-care professionals are generally provided with only a few hours of basic training. Although perhaps able to apply the underpinning principles of motivational interviewing, these professionals generally lack the training and applied skills to truly master the art of dealing with the patient's resistant statements in a collaborative manner. It is important that therapists know their own limitations and are prepared to refer clients to other professionals when required. To address training difficulties, one study outlines successful evidence-based modalities (e.g., workshops, ongoing coaching, etc.) for training busy clinical providers in motivational interviewing.

=== Group treatment ===
Although studies are somewhat limited, it appears that delivering motivational interviewing, in a group may be less effective than when delivered one-on-one. Research continues into this area however what is clear is that groups change the dynamics of a situation and the therapist needs to ensure that group control is maintained and input from group members does not derail the process for some clients.

== Applications ==
Motivational interviewing was initially developed for the treatment of substance use disorder, but MI is continuously being applied across health fields and beyond that. The following fields have used the technique of MI.

=== Brief intervention ===
Brief intervention and MI are both techniques used to empower behavioral change within individuals. Behavioral interventions "generally refer to opportunistic interventions by non-specialists (e.g. GPs) offered to patients who may be attending for some unrelated condition". Due to speculation in the health industry the use of brief intervention has been deemed to be used too loosely and the implementation of MI is increasing rapidly.

=== Classroom management ===
Motivational interviewing has been incorporated into managing a classroom. Due to the nature of MI where it elicits and evokes behavioral change within an individual it has shown to be effective in a classroom especially when provoking behavior change within an individual. In association with MI, the classroom check-up method is incorporated which is a consultation model that addresses the need for classroom level support.

=== Coaching ===
Motivational interviewing has been implemented in coaching, specifically health-based coaching to aid in a better lifestyle for individuals. A study titled "Motivational interviewing-based health coaching as a chronic care intervention" was conducted to evaluate if MI had an impact on individuals health who were assessed as chronically ill. The study's results showed that the group that MI was applied to had "improved their self-efficacy, patient activation, lifestyle change and perceived health status".

=== Environmental sustainability ===
Initially, in the early 1980s, motivational interviewing was implemented and formulated to elicit behavioral change in individuals suffering from substance use disorder. However, MI is based on the work of Psychologist Carl Rogers, Unconditional Positive Regard, and has shown to be applicable in hundreds of behavioral use cases. This includes applications of Motivational Interviewing to environmental sustainability. One view of climate change's cause is a global effect from billions of people choosing thousands of behaviors. Motivational Interviewing is effective at evoking thoughts, feelings, and action towards change and this includes readiness for change towards greater personal sustainable choices. Applications have included use by citizens for interacting with elected representatives on climate policy, interfamilial discussions based on listening instead of judgement and education. New use cases by environmental NGO's, and municipal governments include facilitating new personal choices in the scopes of waste management, home energy use, water use, personal transportation habits, consumption habits and many other environmental applications.

=== Mental disorders ===
Motivational interviewing was originally developed by William R. Miller and Stephen Rollnick in the 1980s in order to aid people with substance use disorders. However, it has also been implemented to help aid in established models with mental disorders such as anxiety and depression. Currently an established model known as cognitive behavioral therapy (CBT) is being implemented to aid in these issues. Research suggests that with collaborating motivational interviewing and CBT has proved to be effective as they have both shown to be effective. A study was conducted as a randomized cluster trial that suggests that when MI was implemented it "associated with improved depressive symptoms and remission rate". There is currently insufficient research papers to prove the effect of MI in mental disorders. However, it is increasingly being applied and more research is going into it.

==== Dual diagnosis ====
Dual diagnosis can be defined as a "term that is used to describe when a person is experiencing both mental health problems and substance misuse". Motivational interviewing is used as a preventative measure for individuals suffering from both a mental health issue and substance misuse due to the nature of MI eliciting behavioral change in individuals.

=== Problem gambling ===
Gambling issues are on the rise and it is becoming a struggle for therapists to maintain it. Research suggests that many individuals "even those who actively seek and start gambling treatment, do not receive the full recommended course of therapy". Motivational interviewing has been widely used and adapted by therapists to overcome gambling issues, it is used in collaboration with cognitive behavioral therapy and self-directed treatments. The goal of using MI in an individual who is having issues with gambling is to recognize and overcome those barriers and "increase overall investment in therapy by supporting an individual's commitment to changing problem behaviours".

=== Parenting ===
Motivational interviewing is implemented to evoke behavioral change in an individual. Provoking behavioral change includes the recognizing of the issue from an individual. A research study was conducted using motivational interviewing to help promote oral regime and hygiene within children under the supervision of a parent. In this study the experimental group was parents who received MI education in a "pamphlet, watched a videotape, as well as received an MI counselling session and six follow-up telephone calls". Children in the MI group, "exhibited significantly less new cavities (decayed or filled surfaces)" than children in the control group. This suggests that the application of MI with parenting can significantly impact children's outcomes.

=== Substance dependence ===
Motivational interviewing was initially developed in order to aid people with substance use, specifically alcohol. However, MI has been implemented in other substance use or dependence treatments. Research that was conducted utilized MI with a cocaine-detoxification program. This research had found that for the 105 randomly assigned patients, "completers who received MI increased use of behavioural coping strategies and had fewer cocaine-positive urine samples on beginning the primary treatment". This evidence suggests that the application of MI for cocaine dependence may have a positive impact in aiding the individual to overcome this issue.

A 2016 Cochrane review focused on alcohol misuse in young adults in 84 trials found no substantive, meaningful benefits for MI for preventing alcohol misuse or alcohol-related problems.

=== Stigma Reduction ===
Stigma is the deleterious, structural force that devalues members of groups that hold undesirable characteristics. In the case of people living with HIV (PLHIV), HIV-related stigma has negative effects on health outcomes, including non-optimal medication adherence, lower visit adherence, higher depression, and overall lower quality of life. HIV-related stigma causes PLHIV to lose social standing due to their HIV positive status, and therefore, eliminating stigma against PLHIV, is a high priority. A study conducted in 2021 found that Healthy Choices, an intervention that was developing using Motivational Enhancement Therapy, an adaptation of Motivational Interviewing, was associated with reductions in stigma among youth living with HIV. While the authors suggest that their findings should be replicated, this study provides a basis for including Motivational Interviewing in stigma reduction research.

== See also ==
- Motivational interviewing: What is MI and how can it be applied in everyday life? (Wikiversity)
- Motivational therapy
- Transtheoretical model

== Sources ==
- Ajzen, I., & Fishbein, M. (1980). Understanding attitudes and predicting social behavior. Englewood Cliffs, NJ: Prentice-Hall. ISBN 978-0139364358.
- Brennan, T. (1982) Commitment to Counseling: Effects of Motivational Interviewing and Contractual Agreements on Help-seeking Attitudes and Behavior. Doctoral Thesis:University.of Nebraska.
- Herman, K. C., Reinke, W.M., Frey, A.J., & Shepard, S.A. (2013). Motivational interviewing in schools: Strategies for engaging parents, teachers, and students. New York: Springer. ISBN 978-0826130723
- Miller, W. R., & Rollnick, S. (1991). Motivational Interviewing: Preparing People to Change Addictive Behavior. New York: Guilford Press. ISBN 978-0-89862-566-0
- Miller, W. R. and Rollnick, S. (2002). Motivational Interviewing: Preparing People to Change, 2nd ed. New York: Guilford Press. ISBN 978-1572305632
- Miller, W. R., & Rollnick, S. (2012). Motivational Interviewing, Helping People Change, 3rd ed. New York: Guilford Press. ISBN 978-1-60918-227-4
- Rollnick, S.; Heather, N.; Bell, A. (1992). "Negotiating behaviour change in medical settings: The development of brief motivational interviewing". Journal of Mental Health. 1: 25–37.
- Patterson, D. A. (2008). "Motivational interviewing: Does it increase retention in outpatient treatment?". Substance Abuse. 29 (1): 17–23.
- Patterson, D. A. (2009). Retaining Addicted & HIV-Infected Clients in Treatment Services. Saarbrücken, Germany: VDM Publishing House Ltd. ISBN 978-3639076714.
- Prochaska, J. O. (1983). "Self changers vs. therapy changers vs.Schachter". American Psychologist. 38: 853–854.
- Reinke, W. M., Herman, K. C., & Sprick, R. (2011). Motivational Interviewing for Effective Classroom Management: The Classroom Check-Up. New York: Guilford Press. ISBN 978-1609182588.
- Rogers, Carl (1961). On becoming a person: A therapist's view of psychotherapy. London: Constable. ISBN 1-84529-057-7.
- Rollnick, S., Miller, W. R., & Butler, C. C. (2007). Motivational Interviewing in Health Care: Helping Patients Change Behavior. New York: Guilford Press. ISBN 978-1-59385-613-7.
- Wagner, C. C., Ingersoll, K. S., With Contributors (2012). Motivational Interviewing in Groups. New York: Guilford Press. ISBN 978-1-4625-0792-4
