= Substance dependence =

Need for a drug, whose discontinuation results in withdrawal symptoms

- Other names: Drug dependence
- Specialty: Psychiatry

Substance dependence, also known as drug dependence, is a biopsychological situation whereby an individual's functionality is dependent on the necessitated re-consumption of a psychoactive substance because of an adaptive state that has developed within the individual from psychoactive substance consumption that results in the experience of withdrawal and that necessitates the re-consumption of the drug. A drug addiction, a distinct concept from substance dependence, is defined as compulsive, out-of-control drug use, despite negative consequences. An addictive drug is a drug which is both rewarding and reinforcing. ΔFosB, a gene transcription factor, is now known to be a critical component and common factor in the development of virtually all forms of behavioral and drug addictions, but not dependence.

The International Classification of Diseases classifies substance dependence as a mental and behavioural disorder. In the Diagnostic and Statistical Manual of Mental Disorders (DSM-5) (released in 2013), substance abuse and substance dependence were eliminated and replaced with the single diagnosis of substance use disorders. This was done because "the tolerance and withdrawal that previously defined dependence are actually very normal responses to prescribed medications that affect the central nervous system and do not necessarily indicate the presence of an addiction."

Addiction and dependence glossary
- addiction – a neuropsychological disorder characterized by a persistent and intense urge to use a drug or engage in a behavior that produces natural reward; addictive drug – psychoactive substances that with repeated use are associated with significantly higher rates of substance use disorders, due in large part to the drug's effect on brain reward systems; dependence – an adaptive state associated with a withdrawal syndrome upon cessation of repeated exposure to a stimulus (e.g., drug intake); drug sensitization or reverse tolerance – the escalating effect of a drug resulting from repeated administration at a given dose; drug withdrawal – symptoms that occur upon cessation of repeated drug use; physical dependence – dependence that involves persistent physical–somatic withdrawal symptoms (e.g., delirium tremens and nausea); psychological dependence – dependence that is characterized by emotional-motivational withdrawal symptoms (e.g., anhedonia and anxiety) that affect cognitive functioning.; reinforcing stimuli – stimuli that increase the probability of repeating behaviors paired with them; rewarding stimuli – stimuli that the brain interprets as intrinsically positive and desirable or as something to approach; sensitization – an amplified response to a stimulus resulting from repeated exposure to it; substance use disorder – a condition in which the use of substances leads to clinically and functionally significant impairment or distress; drug tolerance – the diminishing effect of a drug resulting from repeated administration at a given dose

== Withdrawal ==
Withdrawal is the body's reaction to abstaining from a substance upon which a person has developed a dependence syndrome. When dependence has developed, cessation of substance-use produces an unpleasant state, which promotes continued drug use through negative reinforcement; i.e., the drug is used to escape or avoid re-entering the associated withdrawal state. The withdrawal state may include physical-somatic symptoms (physical dependence), emotional-motivational symptoms (psychological dependence), or both. Chemical and hormonal imbalances may arise if the substance is not re-introduced. Psychological stress may also result if the substance is not re-introduced.

Infants also experience substance withdrawal, known as neonatal abstinence syndrome (NAS), which can have severe and life-threatening effects. Addiction to drugs such as alcohol in expectant mothers not only causes NAS, but also an array of other issues which can continually affect the infant throughout their lifetime.

== Risk factors ==
Mental health as a risk factor for illicit drug dependency or abuse

=== Dependence potential ===
The dependence potential or dependence liability of a drug varies from substance to substance, and from individual to individual. Dose, frequency, pharmacokinetics of a particular substance, route of administration, and time are critical factors for developing a drug dependence.

An article in The Lancet compared the harm and dependence liability of 20 drugs, using a scale from zero to three for physical dependence, psychological dependence, and pleasure to create a mean score for dependence. Selected results can be seen in the chart below.

Drug	Mean	Pleasure	Psychological dependence	Physical dependence
Heroin/Morphine	3.00	3.0	3.0	3.0
Cocaine	2.39	3.0	2.8	1.3
Tobacco	2.21	2.3	2.6	1.8
Barbiturates	2.01	2.0	2.2	1.8
Alcohol	1.93	2.3	1.9	1.6
Ketamine	1.54	1.9	1.7	1.0
Benzodiazepines	1.83	1.7	2.1	1.8
Amphetamine	1.67	2.0	1.9	1.1
Cannabis	1.51	1.9	1.7	0.8
Ecstasy	1.13	1.5	1.2	0.7

=== Capture rates ===
Capture rates enumerate the percentage of users who reported that they had become dependent to their respective drug at some point.

Drug	% of users
Cannabis	9%
Caffeine	9%
Alcohol	15.4%
Cocaine	16.7%
Heroin	23.1%
Tobacco	31.9%

== Biomolecular mechanisms ==
=== Psychological dependence ===
Two factors have been identified as playing pivotal roles in psychological dependence: the neuropeptide "corticotropin-releasing factor" (CRF) and the gene transcription factor "cAMP response element binding protein" (CREB). The nucleus accumbens (NAcc) is one brain structure that has been implicated in the psychological component of drug dependence. In the NAcc, CREB is activated by cyclic adenosine monophosphate (cAMP) immediately after a high and triggers changes in gene expression that affect proteins such as dynorphin; dynorphin peptides reduce dopamine release into the NAcc by temporarily inhibiting the reward pathway. A sustained activation of CREB thus forces a larger dose to be taken to reach the same effect. In addition, it leaves the user feeling generally depressed and dissatisfied, and unable to find pleasure in previously enjoyable activities, often leading to a return to the drug for another dose.

In addition to CREB, it is hypothesized that stress mechanisms play a role in dependence. Koob and Kreek have hypothesized that during drug use, corticotropin-releasing factor (CRF) the hypothalamic–pituitary–adrenal axis (HPA axis) and other stress systems in the extended amygdala. This activation influences the dysregulated emotional state associated with psychological dependence. They found that as drug use escalates, so does the presence of CRF in human cerebrospinal fluid. In rat models, the separate use of CRF inhibitors and CRF receptor antagonists both decreased self-administration of the drug of study. Other studies in this review showed dysregulation of other neuropeptides that affect the HPA axis, including enkephalin which is an endogenous opioid peptide that regulates pain. It also appears that μ-opioid receptors, which enkephalin acts upon, is influential in the reward system and can regulate the expression of stress hormones.

Increased expression of AMPA receptors in nucleus accumbens MSNs is a potential mechanism of aversion produced by drug withdrawal.

=== Physical dependence ===
Upregulation of the cAMP signal transduction pathway in the locus coeruleus by CREB has been implicated as the mechanism responsible for certain aspects of opioid-induced physical dependence. The temporal course of withdrawal correlates with LC firing, and administration of α_{2} agonists into the locus coeruleus leads to a decrease in LC firing and norepinephrine release during withdrawal. A possible mechanism involves upregulation of NMDA receptors, which is supported by the attenuation of withdraw by NMDA receptor antagonists. Physical dependence on opioids has been observed to produce an elevation of extracellular glutamate, an increase in NMDA receptor subunits NR1 and NR2A, phosphorylated CaMKII, and c-fos. Expression of CaMKII and c-fos is attenuated by NMDA receptor antagonists, which is associated with blunted withdrawal in adult rats, but not neonatal rats While acute administration of opioids decreases AMPA receptor expression and depresses both NMDA and non-NMDA excitatory postsynaptic potentials in the NAC, withdrawal involves a lowered threshold for LTP and an increase in spontaneous firing in the NAc.

== Diagnosis ==
=== DSM classification ===
"Substance dependence", as defined in the DSM-IV, can be diagnosed with physiological dependence, evidence of tolerance or withdrawal, or without physiological dependence. DSM-IV substance dependencies include:

- 303.90 Alcohol dependence
- 304.00 Opioid dependence
- 304.10 Sedative, hypnotic, or anxiolytic dependence (including benzodiazepine dependence and barbiturate dependence)
- 304.20 Cocaine dependence
- 304.30 Cannabis dependence
- 304.40 Amphetamine dependence (or amphetamine-like)
- 304.50 Hallucinogen dependence
- 304.60 Inhalant dependence
- 304.80 Polysubstance dependence
- 304.90 Phencyclidine (or phencyclidine-like) dependence
- 304.90 Other (or unknown) substance dependence
- 305.10 Nicotine dependence

== Management ==
Addiction is a complex but treatable condition. It is characterized by compulsive drug craving, seeking, and use that persists even if the user is aware of severe adverse consequences. For some people, addiction becomes chronic, with periodic relapses even after long periods of abstinence. As a chronic, relapsing disease, addiction may require continued treatments to increase the intervals between relapses and diminish their intensity. While some with substance issues recover and lead fulfilling lives, others require ongoing additional support. The ultimate goal of addiction treatment is to enable an individual to manage their substance misuse; for some this may mean abstinence. Immediate goals are often to reduce substance abuse, improve the patient's ability to function, and minimize the medical and social complications of substance abuse and their addiction; this is called "harm reduction".

Treatments for addiction vary widely according to the types of drugs involved, amount of drugs used, duration of the drug addiction, medical complications and the social needs of the individual. Determining the best type of recovery program for an addicted person depends on a number of factors, including: personality, drugs of choice, concept of spirituality or religion, mental or physical illness, and local availability and affordability of programs.

Many different ideas circulate regarding what is considered a successful outcome in the recovery from addiction. Programs that emphasize controlled drinking exist for alcohol addiction. Opiate replacement therapy has been a medical standard of treatment for opioid addiction for many years.

Treatments and attitudes toward addiction vary widely among different countries. In the US and developing countries, the goal of commissioners of treatment for drug dependence is generally total abstinence from all drugs. Other countries, particularly in Europe, argue the aims of treatment for drug dependence are more complex, with treatment aims including reduction in use to the point that drug use no longer interferes with normal activities such as work and family commitments; shifting the addict away from more dangerous routes of drug administration such as injecting to safer routes such as oral administration; reduction in crime committed by drug addicts; and treatment of other comorbid conditions such as AIDS, hepatitis and mental health disorders. These kinds of outcomes can be achieved without eliminating drug use completely. Drug treatment programs in Europe often report more favorable outcomes than those in the US because the criteria for measuring success are functional rather than abstinence-based. The supporters of programs with total abstinence from drugs as a goal believe that enabling further drug use means prolonged drug use and risks an increase in addiction and complications from addiction.

=== Residential ===
Residential drug treatment can be broadly divided into two camps: 12-step programs and therapeutic communities. 12-step programs are a nonclinical support-group and spiritual-based approach to treating addiction. Therapy typically involves the use of cognitive-behavioral therapy, an approach that looks at the relationship between thoughts, feelings and behaviors, addressing the root cause of maladaptive behavior. Cognitive-behavioral therapy treats addiction as a behavior rather than a disease, and so is subsequently curable, or rather, unlearnable. Cognitive-behavioral therapy programs recognize that, for some individuals, controlled use is a more realistic possibility.

One of many recovery methods are 12-step recovery programs, with prominent examples including Alcoholics Anonymous, Narcotics Anonymous, and Pills Anonymous. They are commonly known and used for a variety of addictions for the individual addicted and the family of the individual. Substance-abuse rehabilitation (rehab) centers offer a residential treatment program for some of the more seriously addicted, in order to isolate the patient from drugs and interactions with other users and dealers. Outpatient clinics usually offer a combination of individual counseling and group counseling. Frequently, a physician or psychiatrist will prescribe medications in order to help patients cope with the side effects of their addiction. Medications can help immensely with anxiety and insomnia, can treat underlying mental disorders (cf. self-medication hypothesis, Khantzian 1997) such as depression, and can help reduce or eliminate withdrawal symptomology when withdrawing from physiologically addictive drugs. Some examples are using benzodiazepines for alcohol detoxification, which prevents delirium tremens and complications; using a slow taper of benzodiazepines or a taper of phenobarbital, sometimes including another antiepileptic agent such as gabapentin, pregabalin, or valproate, for withdrawal from barbiturates or benzodiazepines; using drugs such as baclofen to reduce cravings and propensity for relapse amongst addicts to any drug, especially effective in stimulant users, and alcoholics (in which it is nearly as effective as benzodiazepines in preventing complications); using clonidine, an alpha-agonist, and loperamide for opioid detoxification, for first-time users or those who wish to attempt an abstinence-based recovery (90% of opioid users relapse to active addiction within eight months or are multiple relapse patients); or replacing an opioid that is interfering with or destructive to a user's life, such as illicitly-obtained heroin, dilaudid, or oxycodone, with an opioid that can be administered legally, reduces or eliminates drug cravings, and does not produce a high, such as methadone or buprenorphine – opioid replacement therapy – which is the gold standard for treatment of opioid dependence in developed countries, reducing the risk and cost to both user and society more effectively than any other treatment modality (for opioid dependence), and shows the best short-term and long-term gains for the user, with the greatest longevity, least risk of fatality, greatest quality of life, and lowest risk of relapse and legal issues including arrest and incarceration.

In a survey of treatment providers from three separate institutions, the National Association of Alcoholism and Drug Abuse Counselors, Rational Recovery Systems and the Society of Psychologists in Addictive Behaviors, measuring the treatment provider's responses on the "Spiritual Belief Scale" (a scale measuring belief in the four spiritual characteristics of AA identified by Ernest Kurtz); the scores were found to explain 41% of the variance in the treatment provider's responses on the "Addiction Belief Scale" (a scale measuring adherence to the disease model or the free-will model of addiction).

=== Behavioral programming ===
Behavioral programming is considered critical in helping those with addictions achieve abstinence. From the applied behavior analysis literature and the behavioral psychology literature, several evidence based intervention programs have emerged: (1) behavioral marital therapy; (2) community reinforcement approach; (3) cue exposure therapy; and (4) contingency management strategies. In addition, the same author suggests that social skills training adjunctive to inpatient treatment of alcohol dependence is probably efficacious. Community reinforcement has both efficacy and effectiveness data. In addition, behavioral treatment such as community reinforcement and family training (CRAFT) have helped family members to get their loved ones into treatment. Motivational intervention has also shown to be an effective treatment for substance dependence.

=== Alternative therapies ===
Alternative therapies, such as acupuncture, are used by some practitioners to alleviate the symptoms of drug addiction. In 1997, the American Medical Association (AMA) adopted, as policy, the following statement after a report on a number of alternative therapies including acupuncture:

There is little evidence to confirm the safety or efficacy of most alternative therapies. Much of the information currently known about these therapies makes it clear that many have not been shown to be efficacious. Well-designed, stringently controlled research should be done to evaluate the efficacy of alternative therapies.

In addition, new research surrounding the effects of psilocybin on smokers revealed that 80% of smokers quit for six months following the treatment, and 60% remained smoking free for 5 years following the treatment.

== Treatment and issues ==
Medical professionals need to apply many techniques and approaches to help patients with substance related disorders. Using a psychodynamic approach is one of the techniques that psychologists use to solve addiction problems. In psychodynamic therapy, psychologists need to understand the conflicts and the needs of the addicted person, and also need to locate the defects of their ego and defense mechanisms. Using this approach alone has proven to be ineffective in solving addiction problems. Cognitive and behavioral techniques should be integrated with psychodynamic approaches to achieve effective treatment for substance related disorders. Cognitive treatment requires psychologists to think deeply about what is happening in the brain of an addicted person. Cognitive psychologists should zoom in to neural functions of the brain and understand that drugs have been manipulating the dopamine reward center of the brain. From this particular state of thinking, cognitive psychologists need to find ways to change the thought process of the addicted person.

=== Cognitive approach ===
There are two routes typically applied to a cognitive approach to substance abuse: tracking the thoughts that pull patients to addiction and tracking the thoughts that prevent them if so from relapsing. Behavioral techniques have the widest application in treating substance related disorders. Behavioral psychologists can use the techniques of "aversion therapy", based on the findings of Pavlov's classical conditioning. It uses the principle of pairing abused substances with unpleasant stimuli or conditions; for example, pairing pain, electrical shock, or nausea with alcohol consumption. The use of medications may also be used in this approach, such as using disulfiram to pair unpleasant effects with the thought of alcohol use. Psychologists tend to use an integration of all these approaches to produce reliable and effective treatment. With the advanced clinical use of medications, biological treatment is now considered to be one of the most efficient interventions that psychologists may use as treatment for those with substance dependence.

=== Medicinal approach ===
Another approach is to use medicines that interfere with the functions of the drugs in the brain. Similarly, one can also substitute the misused substance with a weaker, safer version to slowly taper the patient off of their dependence. Such is the case with Suboxone in the context of opioid dependence. These approaches are aimed at the process of detoxification. Medical professionals weigh the consequences of withdrawal symptoms against the risk of staying dependent on these substances. These withdrawal symptoms can be very difficult and painful at times for patients. Most will have steps in place to handle severe withdrawal symptoms, either through behavioral therapy or other medications. Biological intervention should be combined with behavioral therapy approaches and other non-pharmacological techniques. Group therapies including anonymity, teamwork and sharing concerns of daily life among people who also have substance dependence issues can have a great impact on outcomes. However, these programs proved to be more effective and influential on persons who did not reach levels of serious dependence.

==== Vaccines ====
- TA-CD is an active vaccine developed by the Xenova Group which is used to negate the effects of cocaine, making it suitable for use in treatment of addiction. It is created by combining norcocaine with inactivated cholera toxin.
- TA-NIC is a proprietary vaccine in development similar to TA-CD but being used to create human anti-nicotine antibodies in a person to destroy nicotine in the human body so that it is no longer effective.

== History ==
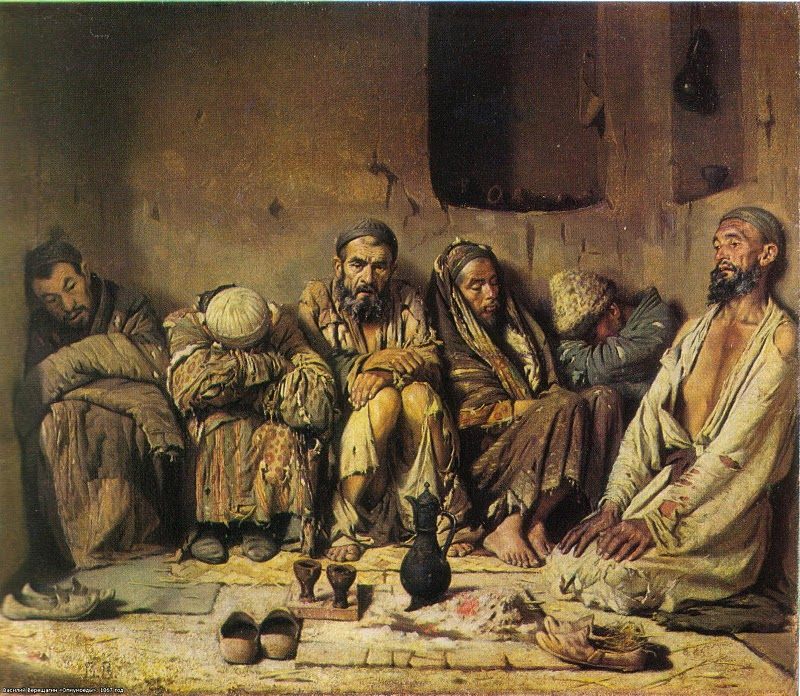
Opium-eaters (1868), painting by Vasily Vereshchagin, Museum of Arts of Uzbekistan, Tashkent.

The phenomenon of drug addiction has occurred to some degree throughout recorded history (see Opium). Modern agricultural practices, improvements in access to drugs, advancements in biochemistry, and dramatic increases in the recommendation of drug usage by clinical practitioners have exacerbated the problem significantly in the 20th century. Improved means of active biological agent manufacture and the introduction of synthetic compounds, such as fentanyl and methamphetamine, are also factors contributing to drug addiction.

For the entirety of US history, drugs have been used by some members of the population. In the country's early years, most drug use by the settlers was of alcohol or tobacco.

The 19th century saw opium usage in the US become much more common and popular. Morphine was isolated in the early 19th century, and came to be prescribed commonly by doctors, both as a painkiller and as an intended cure for opium addiction. At the time, the prevailing medical opinion was that the addiction process occurred in the stomach, and thus it was hypothesized that patients would not become addicted to morphine if it was injected into them via a hypodermic needle, and it was further hypothesized that this might potentially be able to cure opium addiction. However, many people did become addicted to morphine. In particular, addiction to opium became widespread among soldiers fighting in the Civil War, who very often required painkillers and thus were very often prescribed morphine. Women were also very frequently prescribed opiates, and opiates were advertised as being able to relieve "female troubles".

Many soldiers in the Vietnam War were introduced to heroin and developed a dependency on the substance which survived even when they returned to the US. Technological advances in travel meant that this increased demand for heroin in the US could now be met. Furthermore, as technology advanced, more drugs were synthesized and discovered, opening up new avenues to substance dependency.

== Society and culture ==
=== Demographics ===
Internationally, the U.S. and Eastern Europe contain the countries with the highest substance abuse disorder occurrence (5-6%). Africa, Asia, and the Middle East contain countries with the lowest worldwide occurrence (1-2%). Across the globe, those that tended to have a higher prevalence of substance dependence were in their twenties, unemployed, and men. The National Survey on Drug Use and Health (NSDUH) reports on substance dependence/abuse rates in various population demographics across the U.S. When surveying populations based on race and ethnicity in those ages 12 and older, it was observed that American Indian/Alaskan Natives were among the highest rates and Asians were among the lowest rates in comparison to other racial/ethnic groups.

Substance Use Disorder by Racial/Ethnic Groups in 2021
Race/Ethnicity	Substance Use Disorder Rate
Asian	8.0%
Black	17.2%
White	17.0%
Hispanic	15.7%
Mixed race	25.9%
American Indian/ Alaskan Native	27.6%

When surveying populations based on gender in those ages 12 and older, it was observed that males had a higher substance dependence rate than females. However, the difference in the rates are not apparent until after age 17.

Substance Use in Different Genders w/ Respect to Age
Age	Male	Female
12 and older	10.8%	5.8%
12-17	5.3%	5.2%
18 or older	11.4%	5.8%

=== Health Disparities in Substance Dependence ===
There are significant health disparities present amongst demographics that contribute to differences in substance dependence. Health disparities, as defined by the National Institute of Health, include preventable inequities in health caused by barriers that overwhelmingly affect minority demographics. These disparities are commonly related to gender, socioeconomic status, race, ethnicity, and geographic location. Native American, Pacific Islander, Black, and Latinx populations are much less likely to have health insurance than White populations, which can inhibit their ability to seek proper treatment for substance use disorder (SUD). Minorities are also much less likely to receive an alcohol intervention. Minority patients are less likely to seek diagnoses and treatments for their SUDs. Specifically looking at opioid use disorder (OUD), Black patients were significantly less likely to receive a treatment prescription and follow-ups. Minority groups are also less likely to receive early treatment and complete their treatment. Additionally, minorities are disproportionately affected by environmental stressors after treatment, such as unsafe housing, which contribute to the decrease in treatment seeking and completion. These differences can be attributed to a lack of culturally sensitive care and access to same physicians, as well as a historical mistrust of the healthcare system.

Percentage of Individuals Seeking SUD Treatment by Race/Ethnicity
Race/Ethnicity	Percentage
Native American	24.8
White	14.9
Black/African American	15.8
Hispanic/Latino	12.6
Asian	5.9
Mixed	18.4

Native Americans have the highest rates of substance dependence amongst races. The historical oppression and displacement that this group faced continues to cause isolation, poverty, and a lack of education amongst Native Americans. Factors such as forced relocation, loss of land, exposure to violence, and poverty-related stressors are closely associated with the higher rates of SUD. Additionally, the areas inhabited by Native Americans often lack necessary healthcare facilities and services, which contribute to challenges in treatment. Treatment centers in Native American communities often receive lower funding despite the greater need for services.

The justice system has an impact on racial disparities in SUD, as White individuals are more likely to receive treatment for their SUD instead of imprisonment. The justice system is thought to further propagate disparities for minorities who receive a jail term, as it becomes harder to find employment and resume a role in society. Institutional changes in the justice system are therefore necessary to protect minorities suffering from SUDs and offering them help instead of punishment. Solutions currently being examined include raising awareness and educating community members and healthcare professionals, improving health insurance coverage, and increasing the availability of services for underserved populations.

Gender plays a large role in the development of substance dependence. Women become addicted faster and have more difficulty quitting then men do due to differences in sociocultural norms, biology, psychology. Women also face unique risk factors, including increased chances of abuse, mental health disorders such as anxiety and depression, and stress from managing households and children. These challenges can make women more prone to taking substances to relieve stress. Victims of domestic violence are particularly vulnerable, as the risk of obesity, depression, chronic pain, and substance abuse increases. Native American and Black women are more likely to experience abuse.

Alcohol dependence or abuse rates were shown to have no correspondence with any person's education level when populations were surveyed in varying degrees of education from ages 26 and older. However, when it came to illicit drug use there was a correlation, in which those that graduated from college had the lowest rates. Furthermore, dependence rates were greater in unemployed populations ages 18 and older and in metropolitan-residing populations ages 12 and older.

Illicit Drug Dependence Demographics (Education, Employment, and Regional)
Education level	Rates	Employment status	Rates	Region	Rates
high school	2.5%	un-employed	15.2%	large metropolitan	8.6%
no-degree, college	2.1%	part-time	9.3%	small metropolitan	8.4%
college graduate	0.9%	full-time	9.5%	non-metropolitan	6.6%

The National Opinion Research Center at the University of Chicago reported an analysis on disparities within admissions for substance abuse treatment in the Appalachian region, which comprises 13 states and 410 counties in the Eastern part of the U.S. While their findings for most demographic categories were similar to the national findings by NSDUH, they had different results for racial/ethnic groups which varied by sub-regions. Overall, Whites were the demographic with the largest admission rate (83%), while Alaskan Native, American Indian, Pacific Islander, and Asian populations had the lowest admissions (1.8%).

Disparities in SUD prevalence and treatment are being improved through efforts to decrease stigma against SUDs, provide culturally sensitive training to healthcare professionals, and improve access to health insurance and treatment centers in underserved areas.

=== Legislation ===
Depending on the jurisdiction, addictive drugs may be legal, legal only as part of a government sponsored study, illegal to use for any purpose, illegal to sell, or even illegal to merely possess.

Most countries have legislation which brings various drugs and drug-like substances under the control of licensing systems. Typically this legislation covers any or all of the opiates, amphetamines, cannabinoids, cocaine, barbiturates, benzodiazepines, anesthetics, hallucinogenics, derivatives and a variety of more modern synthetic drugs. Unlicensed production, supply or possession is a criminal offence.

Although the legislation may be justifiable on moral or public health grounds, it can make addiction or dependency a much more serious issue for the individual: reliable supplies of a drug become difficult to secure, and the individual becomes vulnerable to both criminal abuse and legal punishment.

It is unclear whether laws against illegal drug use do anything to stem usage and dependency. In jurisdictions where addictive drugs are illegal, they are generally supplied by drug dealers, who are often involved with organized crime. Even though the cost of producing most illegal addictive substances is very low, their illegality combined with the addict's need permits the seller to command a premium price, often hundreds of times the production cost. As a result, addicts sometimes turn to crime to support their habit.

==== United States ====
In the United States, drug policy is primarily controlled by the federal government. The Department of Justice's Drug Enforcement Administration (DEA) enforces controlled substances laws and regulations. The Department of Health and Human Services' Food and Drug Administration (FDA) serve to protect and promote public health by controlling the manufacturing, marketing, and distribution of products, like medications.

The United States' approach to substance abuse has shifted over the last decade, and is continuing to change. The federal government was minimally involved in the 19th century. The federal government transitioned from using taxation of drugs in the early 20th century to criminalizing drug abuse with legislations and agencies like the Federal Bureau of Narcotics (FBN) mid-20th century in response to the nation's growing substance abuse issue. These strict punishments for drug offenses shined light on the fact that drug abuse was a multi-faceted problem. The President's Advisory Commission on Narcotics and Drug Abuse of 1963 addressed the need for a medical solution to drug abuse. However, drug abuse continued to be enforced by the federal government through agencies such as the DEA and further legislations such as The Controlled Substances Act (CSA), the Comprehensive Crime Control Act of 1984, and Anti-Drug Abuse Acts.

In the past decade, there have been growing efforts through state and local legislations to shift from criminalizing drug abuse to treating it as a health condition requiring medical intervention. 28 states currently allow for the establishment of needle exchanges. Florida, Iowa, Missouri and Arizona all introduced bills to allow for the establishment of needle exchanges in 2019. These bills have grown in popularity across party lines since needle exchanges were first introduced in Amsterdam in 1983. In addition, AB-186 Controlled substances: overdose prevention program was introduced to operate safe injection sites in the City and County of San Francisco. The bill was vetoed on 30 September 2018, by California Governor Jerry Brown. The legality of these sites are still in discussion, so there are no such sites in the United States yet. However, there is growing international evidence for successful safe injection facilities.

== See also ==
- Addictive personality
- Dual diagnosis
- Physical dependence
- Risk factors in pregnancy
- Self medication
- Stimulant maintenance
- Substance abuse

Questionnaires

- Alcohol Use Disorders Identification Test
- CAGE questionnaire
- CRAFFT Screening Test
- Paddington Alcohol Test
- Severity of Alcohol Dependence Questionnaire
