= Alcohol dependence =

- Specialty: Psychiatry

Women drinking during pregnancy can cause a fetal alcohol spectrum disorder.

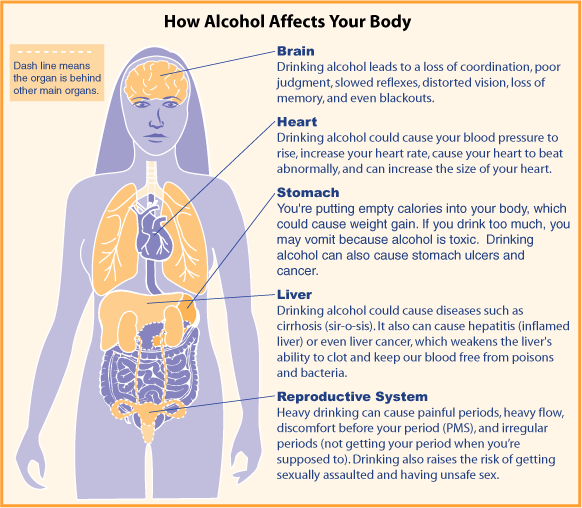
The effects of alcohol has on the body.

Alcohol dependence is a previous (DSM-IV and ICD-10) psychiatric diagnosis in which an individual is physically or psychologically dependent upon alcohol (also chemically known as ethanol).

In 2013, it was reclassified as alcohol use disorder in DSM-5, which combined alcohol dependence and alcohol abuse into this diagnosis.

== Definition ==
Addiction and dependence glossary
- addiction – a neuropsychological disorder characterized by a persistent and intense urge to use a drug or engage in a behavior that produces natural reward; addictive drug – psychoactive substances that with repeated use are associated with significantly higher rates of substance use disorders, due in large part to the drug's effect on brain reward systems; dependence – an adaptive state associated with a withdrawal syndrome upon cessation of repeated exposure to a stimulus (e.g., drug intake); drug sensitization or reverse tolerance – the escalating effect of a drug resulting from repeated administration at a given dose; drug withdrawal – symptoms that occur upon cessation of repeated drug use; physical dependence – dependence that involves persistent physical–somatic withdrawal symptoms (e.g., delirium tremens and nausea); psychological dependence – dependence that is characterized by emotional-motivational withdrawal symptoms (e.g., anhedonia and anxiety) that affect cognitive functioning.; reinforcing stimuli – stimuli that increase the probability of repeating behaviors paired with them; rewarding stimuli – stimuli that the brain interprets as intrinsically positive and desirable or as something to approach; sensitization – an amplified response to a stimulus resulting from repeated exposure to it; substance use disorder – a condition in which the use of substances leads to clinically and functionally significant impairment or distress; drug tolerance – the diminishing effect of a drug resulting from repeated administration at a given dose

=== Diagnosis ===
==== DSM: Alcohol dependence ====
According to the DSM-IV criteria for alcohol dependence, at least three out of seven of the following criteria must be manifest during a 12-month period:

- Tolerance
- Withdrawal symptoms or clinically defined alcohol withdrawal syndrome
- Use in larger amounts or for longer periods than intended
- Persistent desire or unsuccessful efforts to cut down on alcohol use
- Time is spent obtaining alcohol or recovering from effects
- Social, occupational and recreational pursuits are given up or reduced because of alcohol use
- Use is continued despite knowledge of alcohol-related harm (physical or psychological)

==== Other alcohol-related disorders ====
Because only 3 of the 7 DSM-IV criteria for alcohol dependence are required, not all patients meet the same criteria and therefore not all have the same symptoms and problems related to drinking. Not everyone with alcohol dependence, therefore, experiences physiological dependence. Alcohol dependence is differentiated from alcohol abuse by the presence of symptoms such as tolerance and withdrawal. Both alcohol dependence and alcohol abuse are sometimes referred to by the less specific term alcoholism. However, many definitions of alcoholism exist, and only some are compatible with alcohol abuse. There are two major differences between alcohol dependence and alcoholism as generally accepted by the medical community.

1. Alcohol dependence refers to an entity in which only alcohol is the involved addictive agent. Alcoholism refers to an entity in which alcohol or any cross-tolerant addictive agent is involved.
2. In alcohol dependence, reduction of alcohol, as defined within DSM-IV, can be attained by learning to control the use of alcohol. That is, a client can be offered a social learning approach that helps them to 'cope' with external pressures by re-learning their pattern of drinking alcohol. In alcoholism, patients are generally not presumed to be 'in remission' unless they are abstinent from alcohol.

The following elements are the template for which the degree of dependence is judged:

1. Narrowing of the drinking repertoire.
2. Increased salience of the need for alcohol over competing needs and responsibilities.
3. An acquired tolerance to alcohol.
4. Withdrawal symptoms.
5. Relief or avoidance of withdrawal symptoms by further drinking.
6. Subjective awareness of compulsion to drink.
7. Reinstatement after abstinence.

=== Screening ===
AUDIT has replaced older screening tools such as CAGE but there are many shorter alcohol screening tools, mostly derived from the AUDIT. The Severity of Alcohol Dependence Questionnaire (SAD-Q) is a more specific twenty-item inventory for assessing the presence and severity of alcohol dependence.

==== AUDIT ====
The Alcohol Use Disorders Identification Test (AUDIT) is considered the most accurate alcohol screening tool for identifying potential alcohol misuse, including dependence. It was developed by the World Health Organization, designed initially for use in primary healthcare settings with supporting guidance.

==== CAGE ====
The CAGE questionnaire, the name of which is an acronym of its four questions, is a widely used method of screening for alcohol dependence.

- Online version of the CAGE questionnaire

==== SADQ ====
The Severity of Alcohol Dependence Questionnaire (SADQ or SAD-Q) is a 20 item clinical screening tool designed to measure the presence and level of alcohol dependence.

== Withdrawal ==
Withdrawals from alcohol dependence is a common side effect that occurs when a person with the dependency stops drinking abruptly or even cuts back on their drinking after a prolonged period of indulgence. Withdrawal from alcohol dependence can vary from mild, moderate to severe, depending on several factors such as: how long the person has been drinking, whether they are a binge drinker, whether they relapse chronically, and how much they drink daily. All these factors can vary from one person to the next depending on psychological, environmental, and biological factors. Some common withdrawal side effects are as listed:

=== Mild ===
- Nausea
- Vomiting
- Rapid heartbeat
- Elevated blood pressure
- Fatigue
- Body aches / tremors
- Anxiety / Irritability / Depression
- Fuzzy brain
- Issues with sleeping

=== Severe ===
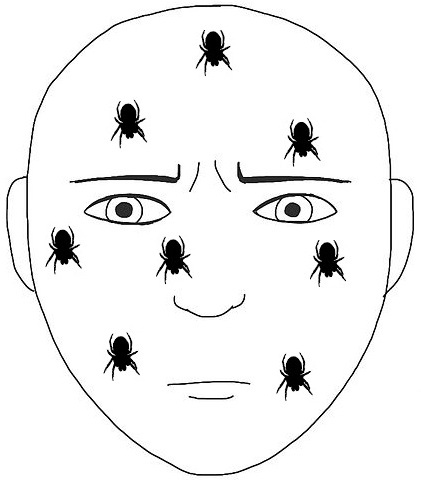
Hallucinations from alcohol withdrawal.

- Vomiting
- Hypertensive crisis
- Seizures / Tremors
- Delusions / Hallucinations
- Dehydration
- Fever
- Chills / Shakes
- Extreme mood lability
- Mental pandemonium
- Little to no appetite

The spectrum of alcohol withdrawal symptoms range from such minor symptoms as insomnia and tremulousness to severe complications such as withdrawal seizures and delirium tremens. Alcohol withdrawal syndrome can be very tricky to diagnose, due to other preliminary conditions that may exist from individual to individual.

== Treatment ==
Treatments for alcohol dependence can be separated into two groups, those directed towards severely alcohol-dependent people, and those focused for those at risk of becoming dependent on alcohol. Treatment for alcohol dependence often involves utilizing relapse prevention, support groups, psychotherapy, and setting short-term goals. The Twelve-Step Program is also a popular faith-based process used by those wishing to recover from alcohol dependence.

The ultimate goal when it comes to treating alcohol dependence or as the DSM-5 now calls it alcohol use disorder, is to help with establishing abstinence from drinking. There are several other benefits that come along with treatment. For some, it is reconnecting with themselves and obtaining self-esteem and confidence, a healthier lifestyle (physically and mentally), creating new relationships with other like-minded people as well as rekindling or mending old relationships if possible. The treatment process consists typically of two parts short-term and long-term. First, there is the path to abstinence and/or recovery. There are several reasons why someone with alcohol use disorder or alcohol dependency would seek treatment. This can either be a personal reason or because of law enforcement. There is a series of different levels of treatment processes depending on the severity subtype. Some would or could benefit from medication treatment with psychosocial treatment, while others could just benefit from psychosocial treatment. Listed below are some different types of treatments that are used with treating alcohol dependency/alcohol use disorder depending on several factors that vary from person to person.

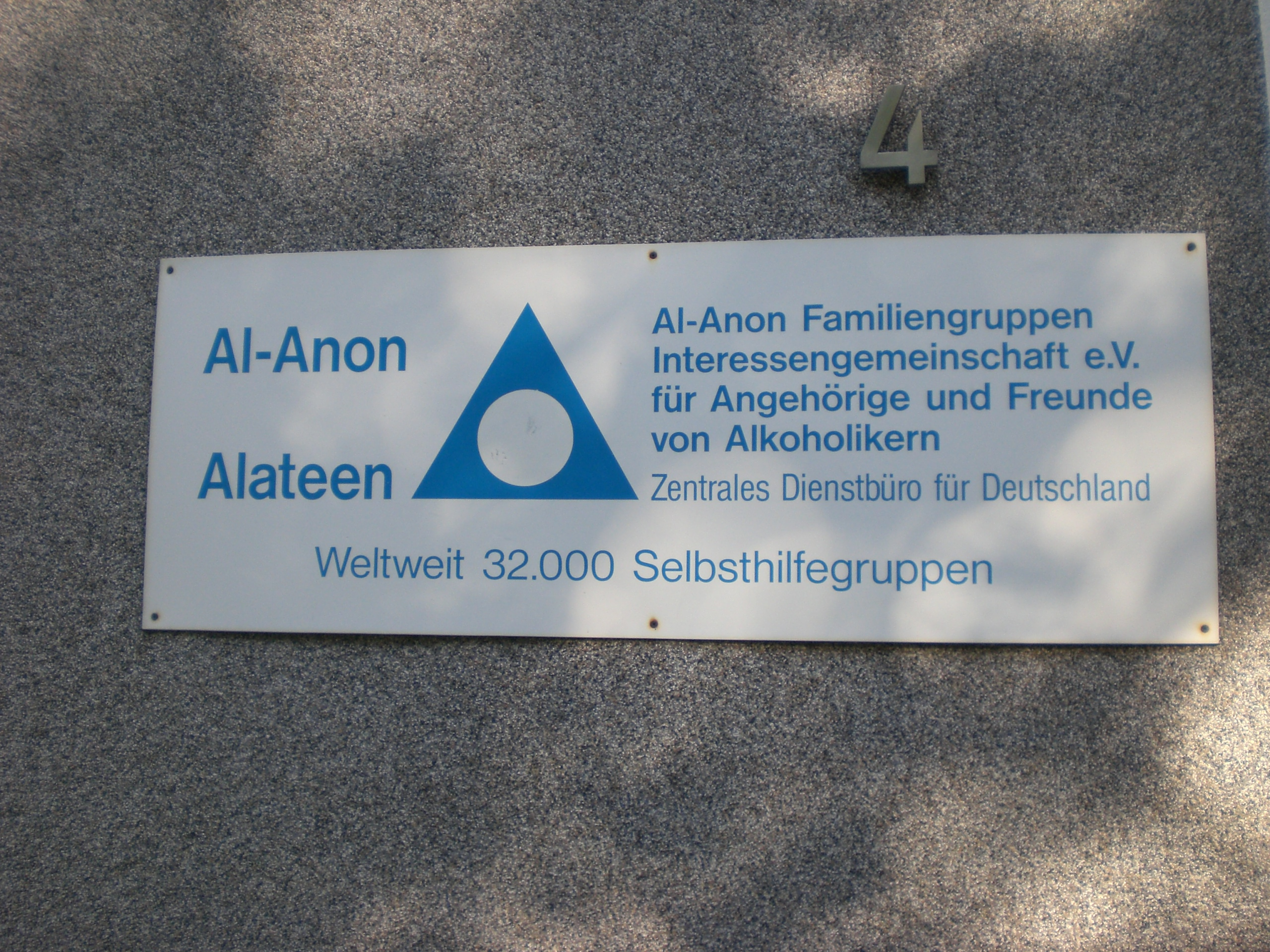
Treatment and support

Types of treatments:

- Withdrawals (no medication aid needed)
- Withdrawals (depending on severity of symptoms, could be accompanied with supervision by medical personal and medication)
- Psychosocial treatment (counseling, CBT, psychoeducation, assertive community treatment)
- Alcoholics Anonymous
- Inpatient or outpatient programs
- Social services (case management)
- Al-Anon/Alateen
- Acceptance and mindfulness-based interventions

Acceptance and mindfulness-based interventions show evidence of efficacy in being used to target Alcohol Use Disorder. These types of interventions are often most effectively delivered in group settings, however, they are also proven effective in individual therapy contexts. Overall, this is crucial in helping individuals who are dependent on alcohol because it raises awareness, provides a non-judgemental environment for people to express their thoughts, and allows individuals to be heard and accepted in the present moment.

== Epidemiology ==
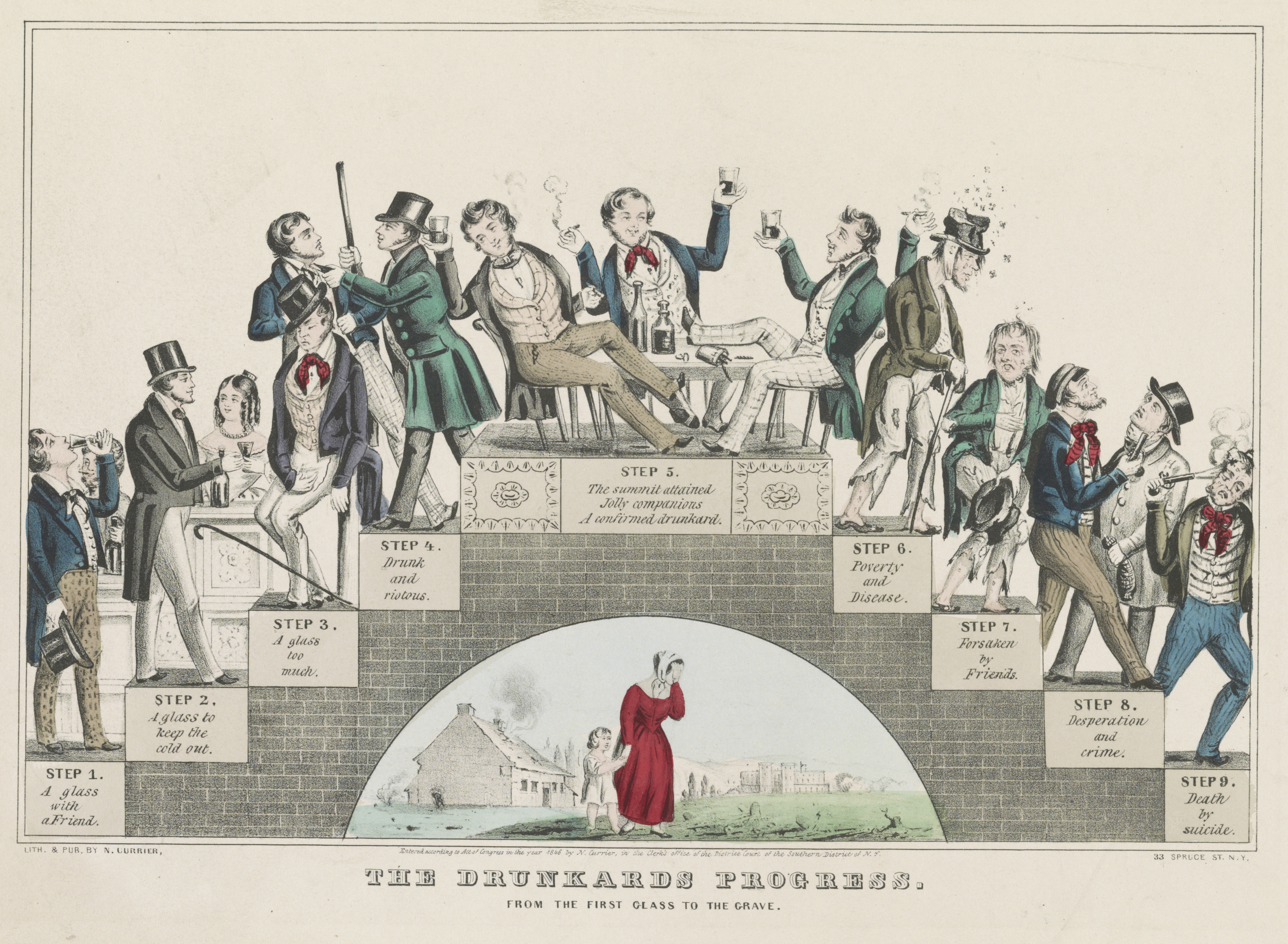
"The Drunkard's Progress", 1846

About 12% of American adults have had an alcohol dependence problem at some time in their life. In the UK the NHS estimates that around 9% of men and 4% of UK women show signs of alcohol dependence.

== Genetic factors ==
A 2015 study found that alcohol dependency may have genetic risk factors. Linkage disequilibrium between an AD-associated GABA receptor gene cluster, GABRB3/GABRG3, and eye color genes, OCA2/HERC2, as well as between AD-associated GRM5 and pigmentation-associated TYR, were all associated with alcohol dependency. GABA downregulation may decrease sensitivity to the toxic effects of alcohol, leading to increased alcohol consumption in blue-eyed individuals.

== History ==
The term 'alcohol dependence' has replaced 'alcoholism' as a term in order that individuals do not internalize the idea of cure and disease, but can approach alcohol as a chemical they may depend upon to cope with outside pressures.

The contemporary definition of alcohol dependence is still based upon early research. There has been considerable scientific effort over the past several decades to identify and understand the core features of alcohol dependence. This work began in 1976, when the British psychiatrist Griffith Edwards and his American colleague Milton M. Gross collaborated to produce a formulation of what had previously been understood as 'alcoholism' –the alcohol dependence syndrome.

The alcohol dependence syndrome was seen as a cluster of seven elements that concur. It was argued that not all elements may be present in every case, but the picture is sufficiently regular and coherent to permit clinical recognition. The syndrome was also considered to exist in degrees of severity rather than as a categorical absolute. Thus, the proper question is not 'whether a person is dependent on alcohol', but 'how far along the path of dependence has a person progressed'.

== See also ==
- Alcohol intoxication
- Alcoholic drink
- Alcohol-related dementia
- CRAFFT Screening Test
- Disulfiram-like drug
- High-functioning alcoholic
- Long-term effects of alcohol consumption
- Paddington alcohol test
