= Brief intervention =

Technique used to initiate change for an unhealthy or risky behaviour

Brief intervention can often be referred to as screening and brief intervention (SBI) or, in England, identification and brief advice (IBA). Brief interventions are a technique used to initiate change for an unhealthy or risky behaviour such as smoking, lack of exercise, exposure to hazards related to international travel, or alcohol misuse. This page primarily describes brief interventions as applied to alcohol. As an alcohol intervention it is typically targeted to non-dependent drinkers, or drinkers who might be experiencing problems but are not seeking treatment. It is an approach which aims to prevent the acceleration or impact of alcohol problems, and/or to reduce alcohol consumption. It can be carried out in a range of settings such as in primary care, emergency or other hospital departments, criminal justice settings, workplaces, online, university/college settings, and other settings.

Brief intervention includes 'screening' or 'identification' whereby a person's drinking risk level is assessed using a validated tool such as the Alcohol Use Disorders Identification Test (AUDIT). This is then followed by some degree of feedback on this assessment. Alcohol Brief Interventions can be brief, such as delivered in a single session, or extended with multiple components or designed to be used multiple times.

It works in two ways:

- by getting people to think differently about their alcohol use so that they begin to think about or make changes in their alcohol consumption.
- by providing those who choose to drink with skills that allow them to consume alcoholic beverages in a safer way.

== FRAMES ==
For alcohol misuse, the following elements have been identified as particularly important, and forming the acronym FRAMES:

- Feedback on the risk for alcohol problems
- Responsibility: where the individual with alcohol misuse is responsible for change
- Advice: about reduction or explicit direction to change
- Menu: providing a variety of strategies for change
- Empathy, with a warm, reflective, empathic and understanding approach
- Self-efficacy of the misusing person in making a change

== Screening, brief intervention and referral to treatment ==
Screening, Brief Intervention and Referral to Treatment (SBIRT) is a healthcare model that encourages the use of routine medical screenings to monitor mental health and substance use as a preventive strategy to promote well-being. It is an evidence-based, public health approach aimed at delivering early intervention and treatment services for individuals at risk of developing substance use disorders (SUDs) and those who have already developed these disorders.

"SBIRT is recognized to include the use of validated screening tools, assessing for substance use risk and problems, sharing expert health promotion and disease prevention advice, and conducting interventions that encourage substance use reduction and/or referral to treatment”, says the American Academy of Pediatrics (AAP) in their policy statement for SBIRT and adolescents.

The SBIRT model was developed by the Institute of Medicine as a result of a recommendation that encouraged community-based screening for health risk behaviours, including substance use. Unhealthy and unsafe alcohol and drug use are major preventable public health problems resulting in 3 million deaths every year worldwide, as reported by WHO. Research shows SBIRT to be most effective with patients with unhealthy alcohol or drug use who do not have a substance use disorder; therefore, the primary goal of SBIRT is intended to reduce the harms and societal costs associated with the risky use of such substances before the problem elevates to a disorder.

As explained by SAMHSA (Substance Abuse and Mental Health Services Administration), SBIRT consists of three major components:

- Screening: A healthcare professional assesses a patient for risky substance use behaviours using standardized screening tools in any healthcare and school-based healthcare setting.
- Brief Intervention: A healthcare professional engages a patient showing risky substance use behaviours in a short conversation, providing feedback and advice.
- Referral to treatment: A healthcare professional provides a referral to brief therapy or additional treatment to patients who screen in need of additional services.

=== Screening ===
Screening in primary care settings is recommended by the U.S. Preventative Services Task Force for alcohol misuse accompanied with brief behavioral counseling interventions for those engaged in risky or hazardous drinking to reduce alcohol misuse.

Screening using formal screening tools or questions can quickly assess the severity of substance use, though importantly, this procedure is distinct from simply asking whether someone drinks alcohol or uses drugs. In some healthcare systems, "asking" patients about tobacco, alcohol, and drug use may be done more often than formally screening patients. Based on the results from screening, individuals at certain levels of risk may receive tailored feedback on risky behavior, which can greatly influence patient behavior. Screening large numbers of individuals present an opportunity to engage those who are in need of treatment and refer them to correct resources. Efforts to provide an evidence base for alcohol screening and brief intervention in primary health care settings have been started since the 1980s in the US and the World Health Organization. This research led to the development of reliable screening tools for substance use, such as the Michigan Alcohol Screening Test, the CAGE, and the Drug Abuse Screening Test.

Research also extended to understanding the best mode of administration of such screening assessments, as part of a clinician interview via a questionnaire, or electronically. Using computers as a means of screening has been in evolution for two decades and recent studies have shown promise for this method. One such study examined the effect of electronic screening with personalized feedback on adolescent health risk behaviours in a primary care setting. In a randomized clinical trial, involving 300 youth randomly assigned to receive screening through an electronic screening tool called Check Yourself with personalized feedback vs usual care, youths who received the electronic screening intervention were more likely than controls to receive risk counseling and also, scored lower on risk behavior. Evidence supporting the effectiveness of screening in primary care settings continues to grow and the positive evidence from this research has encouraged national demonstration programs in the US to control substance use, such as King County's Best Start for Kids. In the United States, the dissemination of SBIRT technologies has been strongly supported by SAMHSA's SBIRT initiative. Universal, annual screening identifies unhealthy use of alcohol and drugs, and it's reported that 75-85% of patients will screen negative. For those who screen positive, further assessment is needed to determine the level of risk associated with their use.

=== Brief intervention ===
Following the screening, if it is determined that individuals substance use is hazardous, brief intervention is conducted. The brief intervention aims at providing detailed feedback, which focuses on increasing insight and awareness regarding substance use and instills motivation towards behavioral change. Originally, the brief intervention utilized brief advice approaches, whereas current U.S. SBIRT efforts focus on motivational interviewing approaches of various lengths. Intervention usually includes giving feedback on the risks and negative consequences of substance use, advising on modifying alcohol and drug use and suggestions options to choose from to modify risky behavior, hence encouraging the individual to exercise decision making.

An important strategy used to conduct Brief Intervention is FRAMES; Feedback on the risk for alcohol problems, Responsibility: where the individual with alcohol misuse is responsible for change, Advice: about reduction or explicit direction to change, Menu: providing a variety of strategies for change, Empathy: with a warm, reflective, empathic and understanding approach and Self-efficacy of the misusing person in making a change.

=== Referral to treatment ===
In cases where brief intervention has shown to have a little effect, the individuals are referred to treatment. A referral is usually indicated for only about 5% of people screened.

=== Applications & Implementation of SBIRT ===
The applications of SBIRT are very flexible so it can be delivered in various settings, including, primary care centres, school-based health centers, clinics, and other community settings provide excellent opportunities for early intervention with at-risk substance users and for intervention for persons with substance use disorders. SBIRT has proved its importance in many medical settings in facilitating early identification of risky substance use, therefore many recent studies are exploring new approaches to understanding SBIRT and how best to implement the intervention to achieve the greatest positive results.

== Evidence ==
A range of systematic reviews published by Cochrane have described a small to medium effect size showing change in primarily alcohol use as a result of these interventions. For example in a recent review of primary care patients including 69 studies, moderate quality evidence was found that brief interventions could reduce alcohol consumption in hazardous or harmful drinkers. Digital brief interventions were found to be similarly effective with again moderate quality evidence that online brief interventions targeting alcohol reduced drinks per week by three standard drinks. Whilst these reviews are robust, they are limited in their ability to summarise change because many of the studies are not measuring the same outcomes in the same way. One review found that in 405 trials, there were 2641 separate outcomes measured in 1560 different ways. When diverse outcomes are used, data is hard to bring together in a meta-analysis and there are problems with differing views on what shows whether an intervention shows Effectiveness or Efficacy. Others have sought to improve the field by creating a Core Outcome Set which can reduce the size of the problem of differing outcomes by creating an international standard for all BI evaluations through the International Network on Brief Interventions for Alcohol & Other Drugs.
