= Blackout (drug-related amnesia) =

Memory loss caused by drugs

A drug-related blackout is a phenomenon caused by the intake of any substance or medication in which short-term and long-term memory creation is impaired, therefore causing a complete inability to recall the past. Blackouts are frequently described as having effects similar to that of anterograde amnesia, in which the subject cannot recall any events after the event that caused amnesia.

Research on alcohol blackouts was done by E. M. Jellinek in the 1940s. Using data from a survey of Alcoholics Anonymous (AA) members, he came to believe that blackouts would be a good determinant of alcoholism. However, there are conflicting views whether this is true. The negative psychological after effects of heavy alcohol use are worsened in those with anxiety disorders. The same groups may also experience anxiety around their activities during an alcohol-related blackout, as they have no memory of their actions. Impairment of the liver will also allow more alcohol to reach the brain and hasten the individual's blackout.

The term "blackout" can also refer to a complete loss of consciousness, or syncope.

== Alcohol and long-term memory ==
Various studies have given rise to proof of links between general alcohol consumption and its effects on memory capacity. These studies have shown in particular, how the inebriated or intoxicated individual makes poorer associations between words and objects than does the sober individual. Later blackout-specific studies have indicated that alcohol specifically impairs the brain's ability to take short-term memories and experiences and transfer them to long-term memory.

It is a common misconception that blackouts generally occur only in alcoholics; research suggests that individuals who engage in binge drinking, such as many college students, are often at risk as well. In a 2002 survey of college students by researchers at Duke University Medical Center, 40% of those surveyed who had consumed alcohol recently reported having experienced a blackout within the preceding year.

In one study, a sample of individuals was gathered and divided into groups based on whether they had a fragmentary blackout within the last year or not. Groups were also divided based on those who had received alcohol and those who had not. In their beverage challenge, participants were given one drink per ten minutes until the target of 0.08% blood alcohol level was achieved. Drinks for the alcohol condition contained a 3:1 ratio of mixer to vodka. After 30 minutes, breathalyzer samples were recorded and recorded every 30 minutes thereafter. In the test for narrative recall, those who received alcohol and FB+ (those who admitted to having a fragmentary blackout within the last year) recalled fewer narrative details after a 30-minute delay but there were no significant interaction effects. The next day, participants were called and tested on their narrative recall and cued recall; the results were that those who consumed alcohol showed poorer 30 minute delay recall and next-day recall than those who did not consume alcohol, but there were no significant effects on cued recall of details. Their study also revealed that those who were FB+ and consumed alcohol also performed worse on contextual recall than the other participants.

Alcohol impairs delayed and next-day narrative recall but not next-day cued recall, which suggests that information is available in memory but is temporarily inaccessible. Those with a history of fragmentary blackouts also performed worse on delayed recall than those with no prior blackouts. Neuroimaging shows that cued recall and free recall are associated with differential neural activation in distinct neural networks: sensory and conceptual. Together, these findings suggest that the differential effects of alcohol on free and cued recalls may be a result of substance altering neural activity in conceptual rather than sensory networks. Prior blackout experiences also appear to be related to impaired conceptual networks.

== Types of blackouts ==
Blackouts can generally be divided into two categories, "en bloc" blackouts and "fragmentary" blackouts.

En bloc blackouts are classified by the inability to later recall any memories from the intoxication period, even when prompted. These blackouts are characterized also by the ability to easily recall things that have occurred within the last 2 minutes, yet being unable to recall anything prior to this period. As such, a person experiencing an en bloc blackout may not appear to be doing so, as they can carry on conversations or even manage to accomplish difficult feats. It is difficult to determine the end of this type of blackout as sleep typically occurs before they end, although it is possible for an en bloc blackout to end if the affected person has stopped drinking in the meantime.

Fragmentary blackouts are characterized by a person having the ability to recall certain events from an intoxicated period, and yet being unaware that other memories are missing until reminded of the existence of those 'gaps' in memory. Research indicates that such fragmentary blackouts, also known as "brownouts", are far more common than en bloc blackouts. Memory impairment during acute intoxication involves dysfunction of episodic memory, a type of memory encoded with spatial and social context. Recent studies have shown that there are multiple memory systems supported by discrete brain regions, and the acute effects of alcohol and learning and memory may result from alteration of the hippocampus and related structures on a cellular level. A rapid increase in blood alcohol concentration (BAC) is most consistently associated with the likelihood of a blackout. However, not all subjects experience blackouts which implies that genetic factors play a role in determining central nervous system (CNS) vulnerability to the effects of alcohol. The former may predispose an individual to alcoholism, as altered memory function during intoxication may affect an individual's alcohol expectancy, one may perceive positive aspects of intoxication while unintentionally ignoring the negative aspects.

== Causes ==
Blackouts are commonly associated with the consumption of large amounts of alcohol; however, surveys of drinkers experiencing blackouts have indicated that they are not directly related to the amount of alcohol consumed. Respondents reported they frequently recalled having "drunk as much or more without memory loss", compared to instances of blacking out. Subsequent research has indicated that blackouts are most likely caused by a rapid increase in a person's blood-alcohol concentration. One study, in particular, resulted in subjects being stratified easily into two groups, those who consumed alcohol very quickly, and blacked out, and those who did not black out by drinking alcohol slowly, despite being extremely intoxicated by the end of the study.

In another study hospital file data showed, that of 67 participants who consumed excess alcohol, 39 had reported a blackout. The presence or absence of blackouts was cross-tabulated against various measures of alcohol problem severity. The presence of blackouts was associated to some degree with some indications of severity such as withdrawal and loss of control, but not with duration of problem drinking, physical complications or abnormal liver function. The presence of blackouts was related to some measures of severity of the problem – withdrawal symptoms and loss of control. The hypothesis that blackouts either reflect a general vulnerability to the cerebral consequences of alcohol use disorder or are associated with other forms of more enduring cognitive impairment did not receive any support.

In another study which looked at subjective responses to alcohol as a prime for 21st birthday alcohol consumption, subjective responses to the initial drink were viewed as a prime for more alcohol consumption during 21st birthday celebrations. Current findings show that subjective responses to alcohol have direct effects on both the final BAC achieved and on the experiences of blackouts and hangover that are not explained by level of intoxication. Where a variety of social factors such as peer pressure and 21st birthday traditions may influence the amount of alcohol people consume, their subjective experiences with alcohol have clear influences on both consumption and the physiological consequences of drinking. These physiological responses to alcohol may have a biological vulnerability that extends beyond the dose-dependent effects of alcohol.

Self reports from another study showed that 63% of patients in the study gulped their drinks rather than sipped. Five patients recollected vomiting during the drinking episode while 32 drank on an empty stomach and 41 drank more than originally planned. During the drinking episode 31% subjects described blackouts, 20% described brownouts, and 49% reported no amnesic episode.

== Neurophysiological and chemical mechanisms ==
Memory disruptions by alcohol leading to blackout have been linked to inhibition of long-term potentiation, particularly in the hippocampus, by affecting gamma-Aminobutyric acid (GABA) and N-methyl-D-aspartate neurotransmission.

Alcohol induced blackouts are associated with the development of alcohol use disorder, so it is important to consider potential neurobiological risk factors for experiencing this problem prior to onset of substance use. Results showed that prior to beginning substance use, Youth+blackout showed greater activation in frontal and cerebellar brain regions during inhibitory processing than Nondrinkers and Youth-blackout. Activation during correct inhibitory-responses relative to go-responses in the left and middle frontal gyri at baseline predicted future blackout experience, after controlling for follow-up externalizing behaviors and lifetime alcohol consumption. The conclusion of this study was that substance-naïve adolescents who later experience alcohol-induced blackouts show increased neural effort during inhibitory processing, as compared to: adolescents who go on to drink at similar levels, but do not experience blackouts; and healthy, nondrinking controls. This suggests a neurobiological vulnerability to alcohol-induced memory impairments.

== Other GABA_{A} agonist drugs ==
Alcohol acts as an agonist of the GABA_{A} type receptor, leading to memory disruption (see Effects of alcohol on memory). Benzodiazepines (such as flunitrazepam, midazolam, and temazepam), barbiturates (such as phenobarbital), and other drugs which also act as GABA_{A} agonists, are known to cause blackouts as a result of high dose use.

== Predisposition to blackouts ==
Research indicates that some users of alcohol, particularly those with a history of blackouts, are predisposed to experience blackouts more frequently than others. One such study indicated a link between prenatal exposure to alcohol and vulnerability towards blackouts, in addition to the oft-cited link between this type of exposure and alcoholism. Alternatively, two studies have indicated that there appears to be a genetic predisposition towards blacking out, suggesting that some individuals are more susceptible to alcohol-related amnesia.

From a neurobiological perspective, central serotonin (5-hydroxytryptamine, 5-HT) neurotransmission has been shown to modulate both alcohol consumption and impulsivity. Some variations in 5-HT neurotransmission may thus contribute to a risk of AD (alcohol dependence), especially the forms of AD associated with a high level of impulsivity.

As the extracellular concentration of 5-HT is regulated by the activity of the 5-HT transporter (5-HTT), the gene SLC6A4 encoding this protein represents an important potential candidate gene for AD risk. Using a meta-analysis approach, Feinn et al. found evidence for an association of the short allele of the 5-HTTLPR (SLC6A4) with AD, but the overall effect size estimated by odd ratios was found weak. As expected in a complex condition like alcohol dependence, the disagreement in the association between AD and 5-HTTLPR likely reflects the impossibility for a single genetic determinant to explain the whole of the risk.

Aside from chemical components which may cause a predisposition to alcohol dependence and blackouts, expectations of alcohol use may predispose drinkers toward alcoholism and blackouts. In a study of 123 college students significant correlations were found between students' alcohol expectancies, level of alcohol use, and blackout history. The students who experienced blackouts (38.6%) had much higher positive alcohol expectancies than those without blackouts. Positive and negative expectancies were positively correlated among the no-blackout group, but negatively correlated among the blackout group.

== Consequences ==
Alcohol dependence is not prerequisite to blackouts (either en bloc or fragmentary). Students in one study who reported blackouts were demographically similar to other drinking students. Importantly, however, students reporting blackouts drank more, and had other symptoms of alcoholic drinking, even though they did not fall into the alcoholic range on the Michigan Alcoholism Screening Test (MAST). Half of the students reported having had a blackout during their drinking careers, which closely followed other research findings.

In another study 25% of healthy college students reported being familiar with alcoholic blackouts. 51% of the students reported that they had had at least one blackout. Blackouts were reported during activities such as spending money (27%), sexual conduct (24%), fighting (16%), vandalism (16%), unprotected intercourse (6%), and driving a car (3%). So a significant number of students were engaged in a range of possibly hazardous activities during blackouts.

Of 545 individuals in another study, 161 (29.5%) reported driving drunk, 139 (25.5%) reported a regretted sexual situation, 67 (12.3%) reported unprotected sex, 60 (11%) reported having damaged property, 55 (10.1%) reported getting into a physical fight, and 29 (5.3%) reported injuring someone while under the influence of alcohol in the past 6 months.
