= Substance use disorder =

Continual use of drugs despite negative consequences

- Other names: Drug addiction, drug use disorder
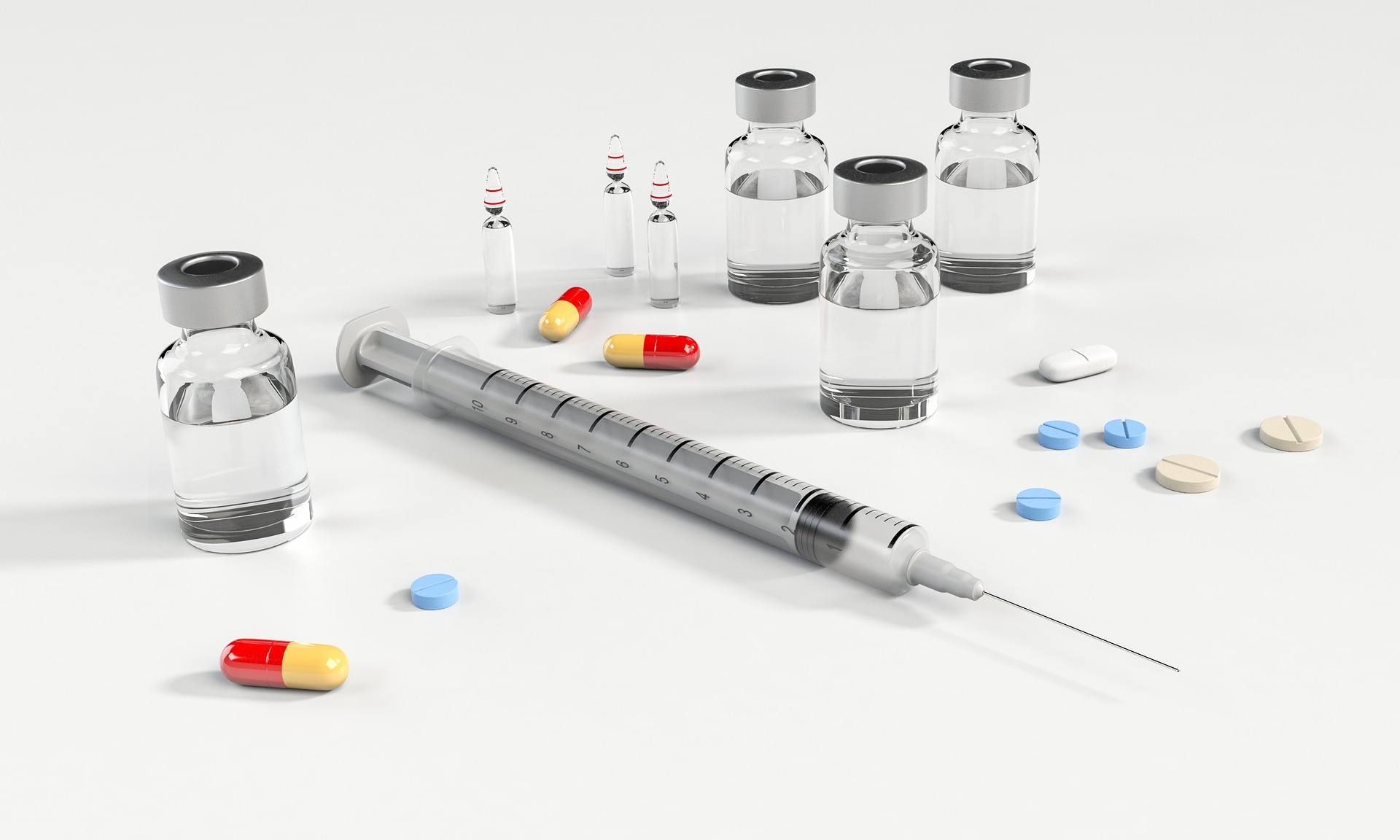
- A variety of drugs and drug paraphernalia
- Specialty: Psychiatry, clinical psychology, addiction medicine
- Symptoms: Excessive use of drugs despite adverse consequences
- Complications: Drug overdose; general negative long-term effects on mental and physical health; acquiring infectious diseases; in some cases disinhibition, which can increase likelihood of turning to criminal behavior
- Risk factors: Family history; other mental health disorders; recreational use of drugs in adolescence and young adulthood
- Diagnostic method: Symptoms of drug addiction and dependence; inability to lower use; continued use despite awareness of negative consequences, and others
- Treatment: Drug rehabilitation therapy

Substance use disorder (SUD) is the persistent use of drugs despite substantial harm and adverse consequences to self and others. Related terms include substance use problems and problematic drug or alcohol use. Along with substance-induced disorders (SIDs), they are categorized as substance-related disorders.

Substance use disorders vary with regard to the average age of onset. It is not uncommon for those who have SUD to also have other mental health disorders. The coexistence of both a mental health disorder and a substance use disorder (SUD) is referred to as co-occurring disorders. Substance use disorders are characterized by an array of mental, emotional, physical, and behavioral problems such as chronic guilt; an inability to reduce or stop consuming the substance(s) despite repeated attempts; operating vehicles while intoxicated; and physiological withdrawal symptoms. Drug classes that are commonly involved in SUD include: alcohol (alcoholism); cannabis; opioids; stimulants such as nicotine (including tobacco), cocaine and amphetamines; benzodiazepines; barbiturates; and other substances.

In the DSM-5 (2013), the DSM-IV diagnoses of substance abuse and substance dependence were merged into the category of substance use disorders. The severity of substance use disorders can vary widely; in the DSM-5 diagnosis of a SUD, the severity of an individual's SUD is qualified as mild, moderate, or severe on the basis of how many of the 11 diagnostic criteria are met. The ICD-11 divides substance use disorders into two categories: (1) harmful pattern of substance use; and (2) substance dependence.

In 2017, globally 271 million people (5.5% of adults) were estimated to have used one or more illicit drugs. Of these, 35 million had a substance use disorder. An additional 237 million men and 46 million women have alcohol use disorder as of 2016. In 2017, substance use disorders from illicit substances directly resulted in 585,000 deaths. Direct deaths from drug use, other than alcohol, have increased over 60 percent from 2000 to 2015. Alcohol use resulted in an additional 3 million deaths in 2016.

== Signs and symptoms ==
Symptoms for a substance use disorder include behavioral, physical and social changes. Changes in behavior include being absent from school or work; changes in appetite or sleep patterns; personality and attitude changes; mood swings, and anxiety. Signs include physical changes such as weight gain or loss; tremors, and bloodshot eyes. Different substances used can give different signs and symptoms.

There are a number of psychological changes associated with substance use disorders, including anxiety and depression. Anxiety and depression symptoms are closely linked to greater substance use over time, especially in adolescents. Some adolescents who are current or lifetime users can experience clinical levels of anxiety and depression, screenable through the PHQ-4. Hallucinations can also occur due to the use of psychoactives such as cannabis, which may lead to onset of disorders like schizophrenia.

The list of physical health conditions associated with various substance use disorders is comprehensive; different substances tax the body in different ways, and each organ system experiences some form of distress or disruption as a result of substance use disorders. Some of the many health conditions are as follows:

- Language and coordination impairment
- Memory loss
- Liver failure
- Hypertension
- Kidney failure
- Deep comatose states
- Transmission of HIV and other diseases carried on needles
- Osteoporosis
- Immunodeficiencies

== Cause ==
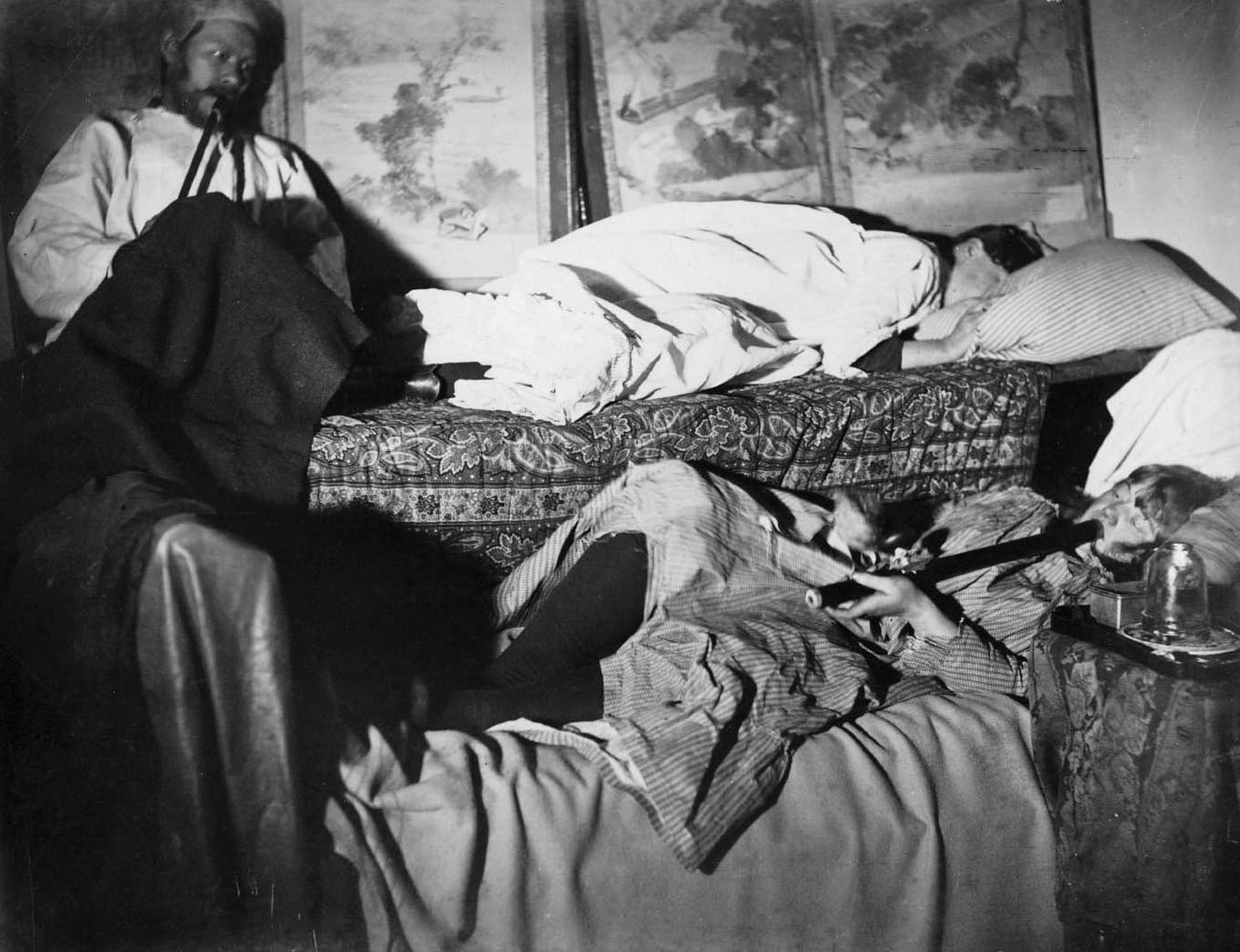
Two women and a man smoking in an opium den, late 19th century

Substance use disorders (SUDs) are highly prevalent and exact a large toll on individuals' health, well-being, and social functioning. Long-lasting changes in brain networks involved in reward, executive function, stress reactivity, mood, and self-awareness underlie the intense drive to consume substances and the inability to control this urge in a person who suffers from addiction (moderate or severe SUD). Biological (including genetics and developmental life stages) and social (including adverse childhood experiences) determinants of health are recognized factors that contribute to vulnerability to or resilience against developing a SUD. Consequently, prevention strategies that target social risk factors can improve outcomes and, when deployed in childhood and adolescence, can decrease the risk for these disorders.

This section divides substance use disorder causes into categories consistent with the biopsychosocial model. However, it is important to bear in mind that these categories are used by scientists partly for convenience; the categories often overlap (for example, adolescents and adults whose parents had—or have—an alcohol use disorder display higher rates of alcohol problems, a phenomenon that can be due to genetic, observational learning, socioeconomic, and other causal factors); and these categories are not the only ways to classify substance use disorder etiology.

Similarly, most researchers in this and related areas (such as the etiology of psychopathology generally), emphasize that various causal factors interact and influence each other in complex and multifaceted ways.

=== Social determinants ===
Among older adults, being divorced, separated, or single, having more financial resources, lack of religious affiliation, bereavement, involuntary retirement, and homelessness are all associated with alcohol problems, including alcohol use disorder. Issues may often be interconnected: people without jobs are more likely to abuse substances which then makes them unable to work. Not having a job leads to stress and sometimes depression which in turn can cause an individual to increase substance use. This leads to a cycle of substance abuse and unemployment. Housing instability and homelessness are associated with increased risk of substance use and can create barriers to accessing treatment and recovery support. The likelihood of substance abuse can increase during childhood. Through a study conducted in 2021 about the effect childhood experiences have on future substance use, researchers found that there is a direct connection between the two factors. Individuals that had experiences in their childhood which left them traumatized in some way had a much higher chance of substance abuse.

While SUD is often viewed as a person-centered issue, it is also a family disease. Individuals struggling with substance abuse frequently damage relationships with loved ones, and in severe cases, SUD can lead to family separation through divorce or intervention by government agencies like Child Protective Services (CPS). Unfortunately, it may even result in suicide, leaving families to grieve. SUD is commonly associated with a range of emotional and psychological problems, including anger, guilt, depression, anxiety, and violence. These issues not only affect the individual but also their family and community. To effectively combat SUD, it's crucial to address its causes particularly in mental health challenges. By improving access to mental health care, people can help prevent and treat substance use more effectively. There are many programs available to support individuals and families affected by SUD. These include therapy centers, support groups, and dedicated treatment facilities such as Bear River Health, Sacred Heart, Harbor Hall, and ATS. Peer support plays a vital role in recovery. Organizations like Al-Anon/Nar-Anon, AA/NA, Celebrate Recovery, and DHARMA provide the support to individuals and families navigating the challenges of substance use.

=== Psychological determinants ===
Psychological causal factors include cognitive, affective, and developmental determinants, among others. For example, individuals who begin using alcohol or other drugs in their teens are more likely to have a substance use disorder as adults. Other common risk factors are being male, being under 25, having other mental health problems (with the latter two being related to symptomatic relapse, impaired clinical and psychosocial adjustment, reduced medication adherence, and lower response to treatment), and lack of familial support and supervision. (As mentioned above, some of these causal factors can also be categorized as social or biological). Other psychological risk factors include high impulsivity, sensation seeking, neuroticism and openness to experience in combination with low conscientiousness.

=== Biological determinants ===
Children born to parents with who have a substance use disorder have roughly a two-fold increased risk in developing a substance use disorder compared to children born to parents without this disorder. Other factors such as substance use during pregnancy, or the persistent inhalation of secondhand smoke can also influence a person's substance use behaviors in the future.

== Diagnosis ==
Addiction and dependence glossary
- addiction – a neuropsychological disorder characterized by a persistent and intense urge to use a drug or engage in a behavior that produces natural reward; addictive drug – psychoactive substances that with repeated use are associated with significantly higher rates of substance use disorders, due in large part to the drug's effect on brain reward systems; dependence – an adaptive state associated with a withdrawal syndrome upon cessation of repeated exposure to a stimulus (e.g., drug intake); drug sensitization or reverse tolerance – the escalating effect of a drug resulting from repeated administration at a given dose; drug withdrawal – symptoms that occur upon cessation of repeated drug use; physical dependence – dependence that involves persistent physical–somatic withdrawal symptoms (e.g., delirium tremens and nausea); psychological dependence – dependence that is characterized by emotional-motivational withdrawal symptoms (e.g., anhedonia and anxiety) that affect cognitive functioning.; reinforcing stimuli – stimuli that increase the probability of repeating behaviors paired with them; rewarding stimuli – stimuli that the brain interprets as intrinsically positive and desirable or as something to approach; sensitization – an amplified response to a stimulus resulting from repeated exposure to it; substance use disorder – a condition in which the use of substances leads to clinically and functionally significant impairment or distress; drug tolerance – the diminishing effect of a drug resulting from repeated administration at a given dose

It is important when diagnosing substance use disorder to define the difference between substance use and substance abuse. "Substance use pertains to using select substances such as alcohol, tobacco, illicit drugs, etc. that can cause dependence or harmful side effects." On the other hand, substance abuse is the use of drugs such as prescriptions, over-the-counter medications, or alcohol for purposes other than what they are intended for or using them in excessive amounts. Individuals whose drug or alcohol use cause significant impairment or distress may have a substance use disorder (SUD). Diagnosis usually involves an in-depth examination, typically by psychiatrist, psychologist, or drug and alcohol counselor. The most commonly used guidelines are published in the Diagnostic and Statistical Manual of Mental Disorders (DSM-5). There are 11 diagnostic criteria which can be broadly categorized into issues arising from substance use related to loss of control, strain to one's interpersonal life, hazardous use, and pharmacologic effects.

There are additional qualifiers and exceptions outlined in the DSM. For instance, if an individual is taking opiates as prescribed, they may experience physiologic effects of tolerance and withdrawal, but this would not cause an individual to meet criteria for a substance use disorder without additional symptoms also being present. A physician trained to evaluate and treat substance use disorders will take these nuances into account during a diagnostic evaluation.

=== Severity ===
Substance use disorders can range widely in severity, and there are numerous methods to monitor and qualify the severity of an individual's SUD. The DSM-5 includes specifiers for severity of a SUD. Individuals who meet only two or three criteria are often deemed to have mild SUD. Substance users who meet four or five criteria may have their SUD described as moderate, and persons meeting six or more criteria as severe. In the DSM-5, the term drug addiction is synonymous with severe substance use disorder. Some clinical and public-health guidance discourages using labels such as "addict" for people with substance use disorder, recommending person-first language to reduce stigma. The quantity of criteria met offer a rough gauge of the severity of illness, but licensed professionals will also take into account a more holistic view when assessing severity which includes specific consequences and behavioral patterns related to an individual's substance use. They will also typically follow frequency of use over time, and assess for substance-specific consequences, such as the occurrence of blackouts, or arrests for driving under the influence of alcohol, when evaluating someone for an alcohol use disorder. There are additional qualifiers for stages of remission that are based on the amount of time an individual with a diagnosis of a SUD has not met any of the 11 criteria except craving. Some medical systems refer to an Addiction Severity Index to assess the severity of problems related to substance use. The index assesses potential problems in seven categories: medical, employment/support, alcohol, other drug use, legal, family/social, and psychiatric.

=== Screening tools ===
There are several different screening tools that have been validated for use with adolescents, such as the CRAFFT, and with adults, such as CAGE, AUDIT and DALI. Laboratory tests to detect alcohol and other drugs in urine and blood may be useful during the assessment process to confirm a diagnosis, to establish a baseline, and later, to monitor progress. However, since these tests measure recent substance use rather than chronic use or dependence, they are not recommended as screening tools. Along with CRAFFT, CAGE, AUDIT, and DALI, there are a number of specific screening tools which can be utilized for adolescents. Focusing specifically on tobacco and alcohol use, the S2BI, BSTAD, and TAPS are reliable tools which can screen for DSM diagnoses across the three types of addiction. The S2BI is useful for identifying a broader range of addictions, and TAPS is useful in clinical settings for a more comprehensive screening of substance use disorders. One of the greatest challenges related to screening adolescents is parental consent. IRB regulations require that research on individuals under the age of 18 includes informed consent from the parents or legal guardians, yet these studies ask participants to report behaviors which are violations of law at that age. Notably, this produces a selection bias in which participants whose parents provided consent were less likely to experience substance use issues.

== Management ==
=== Withdrawal management ===
Withdrawal management is the medical and psychological care of patients who are experiencing withdrawal symptoms due to the ceasing of drug use. Depending on the severity of use, and the given substance, early treatment of acute withdrawal may include medical detoxification. Of note, acute withdrawal from heavy alcohol use should be done under medical supervision to prevent a potentially deadly withdrawal syndrome known as delirium tremens.

=== Therapy ===
Several factors contribute to the rehabilitation of SUD, including coping, craving, motivation to change, self-efficacy, social support, motives and expectancies, behavioral economic indicators, and neurobiological, neurocognitive, and physiological factors. These can be treated in a variety of ways, such as by cognitive behavioral therapy (CBT), which is an intervention treatment that helps individuals identify and change harmful thought patterns that may influence their emotions and behaviors negatively. Other treatment options include motivational interviewing (MI), a technique used to help motivate doubtful patients to change their behavior, and combined behavioral intervention (CBI), which involves combining elements of alcohol interventions, motivational interviewing, and functional analysis to help the clinician identify skill deficits and high risk situations that are associated with drinking or drug use.

Therapists often classify people with chemical dependencies as either interested or not interested in changing. About 11% of Americans with substance use disorder seek treatment, and 40–60% of those people relapse within a year. Treatments usually involve planning for specific ways to avoid the addictive stimulus, and therapeutic interventions intended to help a client learn healthier ways to find satisfaction. Clinical leaders in recent years have attempted to tailor intervention approaches to specific influences that affect addictive behavior, using therapeutic interviews in an effort to discover factors that led a person to embrace unhealthy, addictive sources of pleasure or relief from pain.

Treatments
Behavioral pattern	Intervention	Goals
Low self-esteem, anxiety, verbal hostility	Relationship therapy, client centered approach	Increase self-esteem, reduce hostility and anxiety
Defective personal constructs, ignorance of interpersonal means	Cognitive restructuring including directive and group therapies	Insight
Focal anxiety such as fear of crowds	Desensitization	Change response to same cue
Undesirable behaviors, lacking appropriate behaviors	Aversive conditioning, operant conditioning, counter conditioning	Eliminate or replace behavior
Lack of information	Provide information	Have client act on information
Difficult social circumstances	Organizational intervention, environmental manipulation, family counseling	Remove cause of social difficulty
Poor social performance, rigid interpersonal behavior	Sensitivity training, communication training, group therapy	Increase interpersonal repertoire, desensitization to group functioning
Grossly bizarre behavior	Medical referral	Protect from society, prepare for further treatment
Adapted from: Essentials of Clinical Dependency Counseling, Aspen Publishers

From the applied behavior analysis literature and the behavioral psychology literature, several evidence-based intervention programs have emerged, such as behavioral marital therapy, community reinforcement approach, cue exposure therapy, and contingency management strategies. In addition, the same author suggests that social skills training adjunctive to inpatient treatment of alcohol dependence is probably efficacious.

=== Medication ===
Medication-assisted treatment (MAT) refers to the combination of behavioral interventions and medications to treat substance use disorders. Certain medications can be useful in treating severe substance use disorders. In the United States five medications are approved to treat alcohol and opioid use disorders. There are no approved medications for cocaine, methamphetamine.

Medications, such as methadone and disulfiram, can be used as part of broader treatment plans to help a patient function comfortably without illicit opioids or alcohol. Medications can be used in treatment to lessen withdrawal symptoms. Evidence has demonstrated the efficacy of medication-assisted treatment at reducing illicit drug use and overdose deaths, improving retention in treatment, and reducing HIV transmission.

== Epidemiology ==
Rates of substance use disorders vary by nation and by substance, but the overall prevalence is high. On a global level, men are affected at a much higher rate than women. Younger individuals are also more likely to be affected than older adults.

Share with drug use disorders Map

Share with drug use disorders Line

Drug use disorder death rate Line

Drug use disorder death rate Map

=== United States ===
In 2020, 14.5% of Americans aged 12 or older had a SUD in the past year. Rates of alcohol use disorder in the past year were just over 5%. Approximately 3% of people aged 12 or older had an illicit drug use disorder. The highest rates of illicit drug use disorder were among those aged 18 to 25 years old, at roughly 7%.

There were over 72,000 deaths from drug overdose in the United States in 2017, which is a threefold increase from 2002. However the CDC calculates alcohol overdose deaths separately; thus, this 72,000 number does not include the 2,366 alcohol overdose deaths in 2017. Overdose fatalities from synthetic opioids, which typically involve fentanyl, have risen sharply in the past several years to contribute to nearly 30,000 deaths per year. Death rates from synthetic opioids like fentanyl have increased 22-fold in the period from 2002 to 2017. Heroin and other natural and semi-synthetic opioids combined to contribute to roughly 31,000 overdose fatalities. Cocaine contributed to roughly 15,000 overdose deaths, while methamphetamine and benzodiazepines each contributed to roughly 11,000 deaths. Of note, the mortality from each individual drug listed above cannot be summed because many of these deaths involved combinations of drugs, such as overdosing on a combination of cocaine and an opioid.

Deaths from alcohol consumption account for the loss of over 88,000 lives per year. Tobacco remains the leading cause of preventable death, responsible for greater than 480,000 deaths in the United States each year. These harms are significant financially with total costs of more than $420 billion annually and more than $120 billion in healthcare.

=== Canada ===
According to Statistics Canada (2018), approximately one in five Canadians aged 15 years and older experience a substance use disorder in their lifetime. In Ontario specifically, the disease burden of mental illness and addiction is 1.5 times higher than all cancers together and over 7 times that of all infectious diseases. Across the country, the ethnic group that is statistically the most impacted by substance use disorders compared to the general population are the Indigenous peoples of Canada. In a 2019 Canadian study, it was found that Indigenous participants experienced greater substance-related problems than non-Indigenous participants.

Statistics Canada's Canadian Community Health Survey (2012) shows that alcohol was the most common substance for which Canadians met the criteria for abuse or dependence. Surveys on Indigenous people in British Columbia show that around 75% of residents on reserve feel alcohol use is a problem in their community and 25% report they have a problem with alcohol use themselves. However, only 66% of First Nations adults living on reserve drink alcohol compared to 76% of the general population. Further, in an Ontario study on mental health and substance use among Indigenous people, 19% reported the use of cocaine and opiates, higher than the 13% of Canadians in the general population that reported using opioids.

=== Australia ===
Historical and ongoing colonial practices continue to impact the health of Indigenous Australians, with Indigenous populations being more susceptible to substance use and related harms. For example, alcohol and tobacco are the predominant substances used in Australia. Although tobacco smoking is declining in Australia, it remains disproportionately high in Indigenous Australians with 45% aged 18 and over being smokers, compared to 16% among non-Indigenous Australians in 2014–2015. As for alcohol, while proportionately more Indigenous people refrain from drinking than non-Indigenous people, Indigenous people who do consume alcohol are more likely to do so at high-risk levels. About 19% of Indigenous Australians qualified for risky alcohol consumption (defined as 11 or more standard drinks at least once a month), which is 2.8 times the rate that their non-Indigenous counterparts consumed the same level of alcohol.

However, while alcohol and tobacco usage are declining, use of other substances, such as cannabis and opiates, is increasing in Australia. Cannabis is the most widely used illicit drug in Australia, with cannabis usage being 1.9 times higher than non-Indigenous Australians. Prescription opioids have seen the greatest increase in usage in Australia, although use is still lower than in the US. In 2016, Indigenous persons were 2.3 times more likely to misuse pharmaceutical drugs than non-Indigenous people.

== Research ==
=== Vaccines ===
Vaccines for addiction have been investigated as a possibility since the early 2000s. The general theory of a vaccine intended to "immunize" against drug addiction or other substance abuse is that it would condition the immune system to attack and consume or otherwise disable the molecules of such substances that cause a reaction in the brain, thus preventing the addict from being able to realize the effect of the drug. Examples of addictive substances that have been floated as targets for such treatment include nicotine and opioids. Vaccines have been identified as potentially being more effective than other anti-addiction treatments, due to "the long duration of action, the certainty of administration and a potential reduction of toxicity to important organs".

Specific addiction vaccines in development include:

- NicVAX, a conjugate vaccine intended to reduce or eliminate physical dependence on nicotine. This proprietary vaccine is being developed by Nabi Biopharmaceuticals of Rockville, MD with the support from the U.S. National Institute on Drug Abuse. NicVAX consists of the hapten 3'-aminomethyl nicotine which has been conjugated (attached) to Pseudomonas aeruginosa exotoxin A.
- TA-CD, a vaccine developed by the Xenova Group which is used to negate the effects of cocaine. It is created by combining norcocaine with inactivated cholera toxin. It works in much the same way as a regular vaccine. A large protein molecule attaches to cocaine, which stimulates response from antibodies, which destroy the molecule. This also prevents the cocaine from crossing the blood–brain barrier, negating the euphoric high and rewarding effect of cocaine caused from stimulation of dopamine release in the mesolimbic reward pathway. The vaccine does not affect the user's "desire" for cocaine—only the physical effects of the drug.
- TA-NIC, used to create human antibodies to destroy nicotine in the human body so that it is no longer effective.

As of September 2023, it was further reported that a vaccine "has been tested against heroin and fentanyl and is on its way to being tested against oxycontin".

== See also ==
- List of investigational substance-related disorder drugs
