= Personality theories of addiction =

Personality traits associated with development of addictions

Personality theories of addiction are psychological models that associate personality traits or modes of thinking (i.e., affective states) with an individual's proclivity for developing an addiction. Models of addiction risk that have been proposed in psychology literature include an affect dysregulation model of positive and negative psychological affects, the reinforcement sensitivity theory model of impulsiveness and behavioral inhibition, and an impulsivity model of reward sensitization and impulsiveness.

== Role of affect dysregulation in addiction ==
Research has consistently shown strong associations between affective disorders and substance use disorders. Specifically, people with mood disorders are at increased risk of substance use disorders. Affect and addiction can be related in a variety of ways as they play a crucial role in influencing motivated behaviours. For instance, affect facilitates action, directs attention, prepares the individual for a physical response, and guides behaviour to meet particular needs. Moreover, affect is implicated in a range of concepts relevant to addiction: positive reinforcement, behaviour motivation, regulation of cognition and mood, and reasoning and decision making. Emotion-motivated reasoning has been shown to influence addictive behaviours via selecting outcomes that minimize negative affective states while maximizing positive affective states.

=== Negative affect ===
The relationship between negative affect and substance use disorders has been the most widely studied model of addiction. It proposes that individuals who experience the greatest levels of negative affect are at the greatest risk of using substances or behaviours as a coping (psychology) mechanism. Here, substances and behaviours are used to improve mood and distract from unpleasant feelings. Once physical dependence has been established, substance abuse is primarily motivated by a desire to avoid negative affective states associated with withdrawal. Individuals high in affective mood disorders (anxiety) most commonly report high levels of negative affect associated with cravings. The relationship between negative affect and addiction is not unidirectional. That is, while positive affect increases the likelihood of initiation of substance use, the negative affective states produced by withdrawal are the most commonly reported factors for continued use.

Key to this concept is the Hedonic Hypothesis, which states that individuals initiate use of the substance or behaviour for their pleasurable effects, but then take it compulsively to avoid withdrawal symptoms, resulting in dependence. Based on this hypothesis, some researchers believe that individuals engaging in risky use of substances or behaviours may be over-responding to negative stimuli, which leads to addiction.

Negative affect has also been a powerful predictor in terms of vulnerability to addiction in adolescents. High-risk adolescents have been found to be highly reactive to negative stimuli, which increases their motivation to engage in substance use following a negative emotion-arousing situation. Moreover, it has been established that adolescents high in negative affect are at increased risk for moving from recreational use to problematic use despite a family history of addiction.

Furthermore, the trait negative urgency, the propensity to engage in risky behaviour in response to distress, is highly predictive of certain aspects of substance abuse in adolescents. Early individual differences in emotional differences in reactivity and regulation underlie the later emergence of the trait 'negative urgency'.

=== Positive affect ===
Unlike negative affect, positive affect is related to addiction in both high and low forms. For example, individuals high in positive affect are more likely to engage in risky behaviour, such as drug use. Individuals with high positive affect in response to use are more likely to seek out substances for hedonic reasons. Conversely, low positive affect may prompt initial use due to lack of responsiveness to natural rewards.

Extensive personality research has been done that links positive emotional states to individual differences in risky behaviour. The trait 'positive urgency', defined as the tendency to engage in risky behaviour under conditions of extreme positive affect, is predictive of substance or behavioural problems that lead to addiction. This trait represents an underlying dysregulation in response to extreme affective states and has a direct impact on behaviour. The trait 'positive urgency' has been shown to have a predictive relationship with increases in drinking quantity and alcohol-related problems in college, as well as drug use in college. Furthermore, this trait provides important information on how positive affect can increase the likelihood of engaging in substance abuse.

Another important factor to consider is the individual differences in the experience of pleasurable effects brought on by the substance or behaviour. It is reasoned that certain individuals may be more sensitive to the pleasurable effects and thus experience them with greater intensity, resulting in addiction. For example, over-responsiveness to substance affects has been found in cocaine addicts – an increased response to methylphenidate in the brain regions associated with emotional reactivity and mood. Thus, strong emotional responses that addicted individuals show in response to substances or behaviours might be results of enhanced sensitivity to their effects.

Individuals differ in the way by which they metabolize substances, such as alcohol; these positive reinforcing effects are partly predetermined. Individual reactivity to the effects of substances may affect motivation to use. For example, if a person experiences strong positive (and weak negative) effects from a substance, due to their biochemical profile, their expectations of the positive effects from the substance will be heightened, therefore increasing their desire for continued use, resulting in dependence. According to this model, the experience of the positive mood enhances implicit attention to substance cues and implicit associations between reward and substance use.

Many addicts report symptoms of anhedonia (i.e., the inability to experience pleasure). Results of chronic deviation of the brain's reward set point, which follow a prolonged intoxication, diminish responsiveness to natural positive stimuli. This may result in an over-responsiveness to substance-related cues, coupled with an impaired capacity to initiate behaviours in response to natural rewards. Thus, low positive affect inhibits the individual's ability to replace drug-taking with other rewarding activities. It has also been proposed that during substance dependence the somatic states that guide decision-making are weakened in relation to natural rewards, while at the same time they enhance the emotional response to drug-related stimuli.

Compulsive behaviours characterized by addiction are underpinned by two interacting systems:

1. impulsivity; responsible for the rapid signalling of the affective importance of a stimuli
2. reflection; cognitively evaluates the signal before altering the behavioural response.

Dysfunction in impulsivity exaggerates the emotional impact of the drug-related stimuli and attenuates the impact of natural reinforcement. Dysregulation in reflection results in the inability to override impulsivity, thus resulting in addiction. Under-responsiveness to naturally occurring positive stimuli is a crucial element that biases the individual towards the use of substances or behaviours and away from non-drug alternatives.

=== Effortful control ===
Temperamental effortful control is defined as the ability to suppress a dominant response in order to perform a subdominant response. In other words, it is the degree of control the individual has over impulses and emotions, which includes the ability to focus or shift attention. Temperamental effortful control can influence addiction in a number of ways.

Low levels of effortful control can render the individual less able to distract themselves from unpleasant feelings or overcome strong affective impulses, resulting in maladaptive responses to distress – such as continued substance use. Low effortful control may also interact with negative and positive affect, predisposing individuals to substance or behavioural use, and impair their ability to control use.

A general inability to control affective states may impair the conditioning of behaviour associated with rewards and punishment, may increase susceptibility to biasing by substance-related cues, and could tax self-regulatory capacity. Such conditions may render individuals unable to interrupt automatic drug-seeking behaviours. Abnormal levels of positive and negative affect can be increased by low effortful control. For example, high positive affect may interact with low effortful control in increasing risk of addiction amongst vulnerable populations.

=== Gray's reinforcement sensitivity theory ===
Gray's reinforcement sensitivity theory (RST) consists of two motivational systems: the behaviour inhibition system (BIS) and the behaviour activation system (BAS). The BIS is responsible for organizing behaviour in response to adverse stimuli. In other words, stimuli associated with punishment or the omission/termination of reward, are believed to underlie anxiety. The purpose of the BIS is to initiate behaviour inhibition, or interrupt ongoing behaviour, while the BAS is sensitive to stimuli that signal reward and/or relief from punishment (impulsivity). In accordance with the RST, an association was found between people with extreme scores in BIS/BAS and adjustment problems. BIS and BAS reactivity correspond with individual trait differences in positive affect and negative affect – The BAS is associated with trait impulsivity and positive affect, while the BIS is associated with trait negative affect. For instance, it has been postulated that high BIS is related to anxiety, while high BAS is related to conduct disorders or impulsivity.

According to this model, substance abuse problems may arise under two different personality traits: low BIS and high BAS. Since the BAS promotes the individual to pursue actions that may result in reward, BAS sensitivity is involved in the initiation of addiction. Significant associations have been found between high BAS such as alcohol misuse in school girls, hazardous drinking in men, illicit drug abuse, and tobacco use. BAS sensitivity is a significant predictor of reactivity to substance cues, or cravings. Conversely, BIS sensitivity is involved in avoiding negative situations or affect (such as withdrawal). Low BIS has been positively associated with continuing the addiction to relieve feelings of withdrawal, or for continued use to alleviate negative affect.

=== Model of impulsivity ===
The model of impulsivity states that individuals high in impulsivity are at greater risk of addictive behaviours. The model proposes a two dimensional trait characteristic for the initiation and continuation of substance/behavioural abuse:

- Reward Drive (RD) – reflects individual differences in sensitivities to incentive motivation and engagement of addictive behaviour when reward cues are detected.
- Rash Impulsiveness (RI) – reflecting individual differences in the ability to modify the addictive behaviour due to negative consequences. Individuals high in RI are oblivious or insensitive to the negative consequences as a result of addictive behaviour when engagement is craved.

Both high RD and RI individuals are found to have difficulty in making decisions that have future consequences. Individuals high in RD experience greater reinforcement when initially engaging in the addictive behaviour, and experience stronger conditioned associations with continued use. Individuals high in RI experience greater difficulty resisting cravings even in the face of negative consequences. Some moderators of RD and RI on the severity of addiction are stress and negative affect (such as feeling depressed). That is, individuals high in RD/RI who also experience high levels of negative affect or stress, present more severe addictive behaviours. For example, if an individual is experiencing emotional distress, the distress experienced may lessen impulse control if they believe that engaging in addictive behaviour will decrease negative affect. According to this model, adolescents who are high in RI are at greater risk for developing addictions. Low RI has been shown to moderate some of the risk of addiction due to family history. High RI for individual without a family history of addiction has been related to poor decision-making.

=== Five factor model ===
The five factors are:

- O Openness to experience (inventive/curious vs. consistent/cautious)
- C Conscientiousness (efficient/organized vs. easy-going/careless)
- E Extraversion (outgoing/energetic vs. solitary/reserved)
- A Agreeableness (friendly/compassionate vs. challenging/detached)
- N Neuroticism (sensitive/nervous vs. secure/confident)

Data analysis demonstrated that higher scores for N and O, and lower scores for C and A, lead to increased risk of drug use. Users of different drugs have different five factor personality profiles. For example, Users of amphetamines, benzodiazepines, cannabis, cocaine, crack, heroin, legal highs, and nicotine belong to the type N$\Uparrow$, C$\Downarrow$ (Insecures) and do not belong to the type E$\Uparrow$, C$\Downarrow$ (Impulsives, Hedonists). On the contrary, users of ecstasy and LSD belong to the type E$\Uparrow$, C$\Downarrow$ and do not belong to the type N$\Uparrow$, C$\Downarrow$. Detailed comparison of ecstasy and heroin users demonstrates that they are significantly different. Heroin users have higher N, and lower E and A. Very low A score is typical for Volatile substance abuse.
