= Addictive personality =

Set of personality traits

The term "addictive personality" refers to a proposed set of personality traits that may increase an individual's risk of developing addictive behaviors. While it is not formally recognized in diagnostic manuals like the DSM-5, this concept suggests that traits such as impulsivity, sensation-seeking, and emotional dysregulation may contribute to the development or maintenance of addiction. These behaviors extend beyond substance use to gambling, internet use, compulsive eating, and shopping.

The validity of addictive personality as a construct remains controversial, with some researchers arguing that these traits may emerge as a consequence of addiction rather than serve as predictors, and that the term itself lacks a consistent definition. Despite this controversial status, studies have found links between certain personality profiles and specific types of addiction, suggesting that a more nuanced relationship exists. Genetic factors are also recognized as significant contributors to addiction vulnerability, with research estimating that 40% to 70% of individual variation in addiction risk is heritable.

== Etiology ==
The following factors are believed to influence addiction susceptibility.

=== Psychological factors ===
- Impulsivity
- Sensation seeking
- Nonconformity combined with weak commitment to socially valued goals for achievement
- Social alienation and tolerance for deviance
- Heightened stress coupled with lack of coping skills.

Some claim the existence of "addictive beliefs" in people more likely to develop addictions, such as "I cannot make an impact on my world" or "I am not good enough", which may lead to developing traits associated with addiction, such as depression and emotional insecurity. People who strongly believe that they control their own lives and are mostly self-reliant in learning information (rather than relying on others) are less likely to become addicted. However, it is unclear whether these traits are causes, results or merely associated coincidentally. For example, depression due to physical disease can cause feelings of hopelessness that are mitigated after successful treatment of the underlying condition, and addiction can increase dependence on others. Certain psychological disorders such as panic attacks, depressive disorders, and generalized anxiety disorder have been related to addiction. The addicted person, who struggles with reality and feels negative feelings, such as anxiety and depression, will seek out ways to help them avoid such feelings. A study based on social cognitive theories, included a personality-targeted intervention that was shown to help treat substance addiction. It is feasible that by changing certain elements of one's personality, one can gain a step in the right direction towards changing their addictive personality.

=== Genetic and biological factors ===
Research has explored possible biological and genetic contributions that are often linked to a vulnerability to addiction. Twin and adoption studies have shown that genetic factors may account for 40-60% of the risk for alcoholism and other substance-related disorders, with environmental influences playing a stronger role in early adolescence and diminishing over time.

Certain personality traits associated with addictive behaviors such as impulsivity, emotional dysregulation, and sensation-seeking have been linked to genes receptive of dopamine and nicotine, including DRD2 and CHRNA5. For example, the CHRNA5 gene has been associated with a reduced aversion to nicotine, possibly due to its impact on the brain's habenula region. This may reinforce the continued consumption of nicotine products by reducing the negative sensory experience of early use.

Biological factors have also been found through experimentation on rats. Rats with higher locomotor responses to novel environments were found to be more likely to self-administer stimulant drugs in laboratory settings, indicating a possible genetic predisposition toward drug reinforcement behaviors.

Recent research has further highlighted the role that genetic and biological factors play in traits such as impulsivity and reward sensitivity. A 2023 study by the National Institutes of Health identified shared genetic markers across a variety of substance use disorders, emphasizing how involved genes are in regulating dopamine signaling pathways. Further studies have implicated the CADM2 gene in impulsivity and reward-related behaviors. Variants in this gene have been associated with increased risk-taking and sensation-seeking traits, which are considered potential risk factors for developing addictive behaviors.

=== Environmental factors ===
Studies have found numerous environmental factors that correlate with addiction. Exposure to sustained stress in childhood, such as physical or sexual abuse, especially accompanied by unpredictable parental behavior strongly correlates with drug addiction and overeating in adulthood. Children who tend to react to distress in a more rash way have been linked to becoming more likely to drink and smoke in their adolescence. Results from this research found that this was because the reaction to distress affected psychosocial learning, which led to increased expectancy to drink or smoke. A lack of social interaction has also been shown to correlate with addictive tendencies; rats reared in isolation were quicker to develop a pattern of cocaine self-administration than rats reared in groups. There is a gene/environment connection in that individuals with particular personality traits may self-select into different environments, e.g., they may seek out work environments where addictive substances are more readily available.

== Description ==
Addiction can be defined as an excessive amount of time and resources spent in engaging in an activity or an experience that somehow affects the person's quality of life. An addictive personality is when those addictive behaviors progress and change as the individual seeks to produce the desired mood.

People that face this issue are currently defined to have a brain disease as promoted by the National Institute on Drug Abuse and other authorities. People who experience addictive personality disorders typically act on impulses and cannot deal with delayed gratification. At the same time, people with this type of personality tend to believe that they do not fit into societal norms and therefore, acting on impulses, deviate from conformity to rebel. People with addictive personalities are very sensitive to emotional stress. They have trouble handling situations that they deem frustrating, even if the event is for a very short duration. The combination of low self-esteem, impulsivity and low tolerance for stress causes these individuals to have frequent mood swings and often struggle with depression. A coping mechanism to deal with their conflicting personality becomes their addiction and the addiction acts as something that the person can control when they find it difficult to control their personality traits.

People with addictive personalities typically switch from one addiction to the next. These individuals may show impulsive behavior such as excessive caffeine consumption, Internet use, eating chocolate or other sugar-laden foods, television watching, or even running.

Extraversion, self-monitoring, and loneliness are also common characteristics found in those who have addiction. Individuals who score high on self-monitoring are more prone to developing an addiction. High self-monitors are sensitive to social situations; they act how they think others expect them to act. They wish to fit in, hence they are very easily influenced by others. Likewise, those who have low self-esteem also seek peer approval; therefore, they participate in "attractive" activities such as smoking or drinking to try to fit in.

People with addictive personalities find it difficult to manage their stress levels. In fact, lack of stress tolerance is a telltale sign of the disorder. They find it difficult to face stressful situations and fight hard to get out of such conditions. Long-term goals prove difficult to achieve because people with addictive personalities usually focus on the stress that comes with getting through the short-term goals. Such personalities will often switch to other enjoyable activities the moment that they are deprived of enjoyment in their previous addiction.

Addictive individuals feel highly insecure when it comes to relationships. They may often find it difficult to make commitments in relationships or trust their beloved because of the difficulty they find in achieving long-term goals. They constantly seek approval of others and as a result, these misunderstandings may contribute to the destruction of relationships. People suffering from addictive personality disorder tend to also have depression and anxiety, managing their emotions by developing addiction to alcohol, other types of drugs, or other pleasurable activities.

An addict is more prone to depression, anxiety, and anger. Both the addict's environment, genetics and biological tendency contribute to their addiction. People with very severe personality disorders are more likely to become addicts. Addictive substances usually stop primary and secondary neuroses, meaning people with personality disorders like the relief from their pain.

== Personality traits and addiction ==
Addiction is defined by scholars as "a biopsychosocial disorder characterized by persistent use of drugs (including alcohol) despite substantial harm and adverse consequences". Substance-based addictions are those based upon the release of dopamine in the brain, upon which the range of sensations produced by the euphoric event in the brain changes the brain's immediate behavior, causing more susceptibility for future addictions. Behavior-based addictions, on the other hand, are those that are not linked to neurological behavior as much and are thus thought to be linked to personality traits; it is this type of addiction that combines a behavior with a mental state and the repeated routine is therefore associated with the mental state.

=== Drug addiction ===
A group of British forensic psychologists and data scientists analysed a new large database of users of psychoactive substances. To analyse the predisposition to drug use, they utilized 7 psychological traits, the Five Factor Model supplemented by Impulsivity and Sensation seeking:

- N Neuroticism is a long-term tendency to experience negative emotions such as nervousness, tension, anxiety and depression (associated adjectives: anxious, self-pitying, tense, touchy, unstable, and worrying);
- E Extraversion is manifested in outgoing, warm, active, assertive, talkative, cheerful characters, often in search of stimulation (associated adjectives: active, assertive, energetic, enthusiastic, outgoing, and talkative);
- O Openness to experience is a general appreciation for art, unusual ideas, and imaginative, creative, unconventional, and wide interests (associated adjectives: artistic, curious, imaginative, insightful, original, and wide interest);
- A Agreeableness is a dimension of interpersonal relations, characterized by altruism, trust, modesty, kindness, compassion and cooperativeness (associated adjectives: appreciative, forgiving, generous, kind, sympathetic, and trusting);
- C Conscientiousness is a tendency to be organized and dependable, strong-willed, persistent, reliable, and efficient (associated adjectives: efficient, organized, reliable, responsible, and thorough);
- Imp Impulsivity is defined as a tendency to act without adequate forethought;
- SS Sensation Seeking is defined by the search for experiences and feelings, that are varied, novel, complex and intense, and by the readiness to take risks for the sake of such experiences.

These factors are not statistically independent but the condition number of the correlation matrix is less than 10 and the multicollinearity effects are not expected to be strong.

The results of the detailed analysis of modern data support partially the hypothesis about psychological predisposition to addiction. The group of users of illicit drugs differs from the group of non-users for N, O, A, C, Imp, and SS. Symbolically, this difference can be illustrated as follows:

${\rm N}\Uparrow,{\rm O}\Uparrow, {\rm A}\Downarrow, {\rm C}\Downarrow, {\rm Imp}\Uparrow, {\rm SS}\Uparrow$

(N, O, Imp, and SS scores are higher for users; A and C scores are lower for users).

The hypothesis about importance of E for addiction was not supported by this aggregated analysis of use of all illicit drugs.

Analysis of consumption of different drugs separately demonstrated that predisposition to use of different drugs is different. For all illicit drugs groups of their users have the following common properties:

${\rm O}\Uparrow,{\rm C}\Downarrow, {\rm Imp}\Uparrow, {\rm SS}\Uparrow$

(O, Imp, and SS scores are higher for users and C score is lower for users).

Deviation of N, E, and A scores for users of different drugs can be different. For example, heroin users have average profile

${\rm N}\Uparrow, {\rm E}\Downarrow, {\rm O}\Uparrow, {\rm A}\Downarrow, {\rm C}\Downarrow, {\rm Imp}\Uparrow, {\rm SS}\Uparrow,$

whereas for LSD and Ecstasy (the latter being a so-called "Party drug") users N has no significant deviation from the population level and E can be higher.

Several personality profiles of risky behaviour were identified by various researchers, for example ${\rm N}\Uparrow, {\rm C}\Downarrow$ (Insecures) and ${\rm E}\Uparrow, {\rm C}\Downarrow$(Impulsives, Hedonists). Various types of addictive personality have in common low C.

=== Internet addiction ===
Internet addiction is associated with higher scores in neuroticism and lower scores in extraversion and conscientiousness. One explanation for this association is that virtual environments may feel safer and more comfortable for individuals with lower self-esteem and increased emotional sensitivity compared to real-life environments. Similarly, individuals with low extraversion that desire social interaction but are averse to face-to-face interaction may find the opportunity for online communication attractive. Research indicates that social media platforms utilize algorithmic designs such as infinite scrolling and personalized content recommendations to maximize user engagement, fostering an environment where compulsive usage patterns form among users.

Social media addiction is currently not recognized as a formal psychiatric disorder; however, with over 5 billion people spending an average of 2 hours and 29 minutes a day on social media in 2024, there are many concerns about the impact that social media has on mental health and the daily lives of people. Several mental health consequences have been linked to excessive social media usage, such as increased social media usage being linked to increased levels of stress, insomnia, and suicide-related outcomes.

Traits associated with addictive personality, such as impulsivity and emotional dysregulation, have been proposed as potential risk factors for problematic internet use. The compulsive nature of digital engagement, reinforced by algorithmic content delivery, is thought to contribute to patterns similar to those seen in substance-related addictions.

=== Personality theories of addiction ===
Personality theories of addiction are psychological models that associate personality traits or modes of thinking (i.e., affective states) with an individual's proclivity for developing an addiction. Models of addiction risk that have been proposed in psychology literature include an affect dysregulation model of positive and negative psychological affects, the reinforcement sensitivity theory model of impulsiveness and behavioral inhibition, and an impulsivity model of reward sensitization and impulsiveness.

=== Food addiction ===
While food addiction is widely considered not to be a medical disorder, there is still controversy as to whether food can be addictive as it is necessary for survival. Research has shown that foods can have the same chemical reactions in the brain as addictive chemicals or drugs (e.g. brain reward pathways). Furthermore, certain foods that have a higher level of sweeteners or fats have been found to demonstrate a higher addictive potential. More research is needed to determine the relation between food and addiction. Recent studies have attempted to find correlations between humans and animals, but no general consensus has been reached.

== Cultural correlates of personality ==
The concept of enduring personality traits that predispose individuals to addictive behaviors, which is often referred to as the "addictive personality", has been examined not only in clinical psychology but increasingly through a cross-cultural lens. Although not formally recognized in diagnostic manuals like the DSM-5, traits such as impulsivity, sensation-seeking, and high neuroticism have consistently been associated with increased vulnerability to addiction. Cross-cultural studies using the Five-Factor Model of personality have found that these traits, especially neuroticism and low conscientiousness, are predictive of substance use disorders across diverse populations. This suggests a level of universality in the personality–addiction link, even as cultural norms and expressions of addiction vary widely.

Recent work in cultural psychology and behavioral genetics has further emphasized that while the core traits may be consistent, cultural factors shape how addictive behaviors manifest and are treated. For example, societal attitudes toward alcohol, coping mechanisms, and stress vary across countries, influencing how personality traits interact with environmental factors. As research becomes more data-driven and global in scope, scholars are moving away from older psychoanalytic models toward integrated frameworks that consider both individual personality traits and cultural dimensions. These new approaches provide a richer understanding of addiction risk that respects both universal psychological patterns and culturally specific contexts.

== Co-occurring disorders ==
Traits commonly associated with addictive personality, such as high impulsivity, emotional dysregulation, and sensation-seeking, have been proposed as underlying vulnerabilities contributing to both addictive behaviors and other psychiatric conditions. Research has also linked these traits to increased risks for anxiety disorders, depressive disorders, and impulse control disorders. Additionally, related neurobiological mechanisms, specifically pertaining to emotional regulation and impulsivity, have been noted across addictive behaviors and other forms of psychopathology.

The prevalence of co-occurrences between substance use disorders and various other mental health disorders does not necessarily point to a specific directionality. The risk of developing both substance use disorders and other mental disorders can increase with similar external factors, such as exposure to trauma or stress. While pre-existing mental disorders can lead to substance use, substance use disorders can also lead to the onset of mental health issue, making it hard to determine causality.

The National Institute of Mental Health highlights that co-occurring mental disorders, such as depression and anxiety, are common among those with substance use disorders, underscoring the need for integrated treatment approaches . Furthermore, the concept of "dual diagnosis" refers to the coexistence of substance use disorders and mental illnesses, emphasizing the complexity of treatment and the necessity for comprehensive care strategies.

== Treatments and intervention methods ==
Individuals exhibiting traits associated with an "addictive personality," such as impulsivity, sensation-seeking, and emotional instability, can benefit from a range of evidence-based therapeutic approaches and prevention strategies. Cognitive Behavioral Therapy (CBT) is one of the most commonly used treatments, helping individuals recognize and change maladaptive thought patterns and behaviors related to addiction. Dialectical Behavior Therapy (DBT), which focuses on improving emotional regulation and interpersonal skills, has also shown effectiveness in treating individuals with high emotional dysregulation, often present in those with addictive behaviors. Another approach, Motivational Interviewing (MI), targets uncertainty and enhances motivation to change, making it particularly useful in the early stages of treatment.

Prevention strategies often focus on fostering resilience and emotional regulation skills to reduce the risk of developing addictive behaviors. Programs that teach coping mechanisms for stress, as well as the development of strong social support networks, have been shown to be effective in preventing substance use disorders. Additionally, community-based programs like those focused on improving self-regulation and peer support have shown positive outcomes in reducing harmful behaviors related to addiction.

These therapeutic interventions and prevention strategies collectively address the complex relationship between personality traits and addictive behaviors, supporting individuals in achieving recovery and maintaining long-term abstinence.

== Community support groups ==
The community aspect of peer run groups can reduce stigma and help those in recovery feel less alone. Community-based programs may follow a 12 step spiritual based protocol, encouraging abstinence from all substances, or be non-spiritual and encourage utilization of therapeutic coping skills and harm reduction. Self-Management Recovery Training (SMART Recovery), is one example of a non-spiritual program. SMART Recovery meetings are run by trained facilitators and incorporate aspects of Cognitive Behavioral Therapy. Alcoholics Anonymous (AA), founded in 1935, is a 12 step spiritual program that facilitated by fellow members. The 12 step modality encourages community, sponsorship, total abstinence from substances, and completion of the 12 steps. Another 12 step option is Narcotics Anonymous (NA), which was founded in 1953 as an offshoot of AA for those struggling with drugs addiction. Both NA and AA have similar models of encouraging total abstinence, fellowship, sponsorship, and step completion.

== Criticism ==
There is an ongoing debate about the question of whether an addictive personality really exists. The assumption that personality might be to blame for an addicted person, who is in need of rehabilitation due to drug and alcohol addictions, can have great negative impacts from its supporting a homogeneous answer to a heterogeneous issue in question. These people run the risk of being stigmatized and incorrectly marginalized, and these misjudgments of personality may then lead to poor mental, medical, and social health practices. There are two sides of this argument, each with many levels and variations. One side believes that there are certain traits and dimensions of personality that, if existent in a person, cause the person to be more prone to developing addictions throughout their life. The other side argues that addiction is in chemistry, as in how the brain's synapses respond to neurotransmitters and is therefore not affected by personality. A major argument in favor of defining and labeling an addictive personality has to do with the human ability to make decisions and the notion of free will. This argument suggests human beings are aware of their actions and what the consequences of their own actions are and many choose against certain things because of this. This can be seen in that people are not forced to drink excessively or smoke every day, but it is within the reach of their own free will that some may choose to do so. Therefore, those with addictive personalities are high in neuroticism and hence choose to engage in riskier behaviors. The theory of addictive personalities agrees that there are two types of people: risk-takers and risk-averse. Risk-takers enjoy challenges, new experiences and want instant gratification. These people enjoy the excitement of danger and trying new things. On the other hand, risk-averse are those who are by nature cautious in what they do and the activities they involve themselves in. It is the personality traits of individuals that combine to create either a risk-taker or risk-averse person.

Another important concern is the lack of evidence supporting the addictive personality label and the possibility of stigma. While there is a medical consensus surrounding the genetic components of addiction, there is no such consensus supporting the idea that specific personality types have a tendency towards addictive behaviors. In fact, continued use of this term in the absence of clear evidence could be damaging to the people who believe they have an addictive personality.
