= Dominant response =

Social psychology concept

In social psychology, the dominant response is "the response that is most likely to occur in the presence of the given array of stimuli". Increased arousal "enhances an individual's tendency to perform the dominant response". This means that "whatever you are normally inclined to do, you will be even more strongly inclined to do when in the presence of others". In an easy task, the dominant response is usually correct or successful, while in a more difficult (complex or unfamiliar) task, the dominant response is often unsuccessful or incorrect. For example, in a simple maze where the only path is a straight line, the dominant (and correct) response would be to run straight ahead. However, in a more complex maze in a cross shape where the start point and goal point are adjacent to each other, running straight ahead (the dominant response) is the incorrect response.
