= TA-CD =

Vaccine used in treatment of addiction

TA-CD is a vaccine developed by the Xenova Group and designed to negate the effects of cocaine, making it suitable for use in treatment of addiction. It is created by combining norcocaine with inactivated cholera toxin.

It works in much the same way as a regular vaccine. A large protein molecule attaches to cocaine, which stimulates response from antibodies, which destroy the molecule. This also prevents the cocaine from crossing the blood–brain barrier, negating the euphoric high and rewarding effect of cocaine caused from stimulation of dopamine release in the mesolimbic reward pathway. The vaccine does not affect the user's "desire" for cocaine—only the physical effects of the drug.

== Results ==
Phase III Clinical Trials completed in 2014 showed no significant difference between users given placebo and users given TA-CD. Patients in the high antibody group had a lower drop out rate and fewer positive cocaine urine results in the last 2 weeks of the trial, but it was not significant versus the low antibody or placebo group. However at other points of the study, high antibody users had more positive urine results. This is most likely due to users trying to overcome the antibodies by taking more excessive amounts of cocaine.

This vaccine does not have any effect on the underlying neurobiological cause of addiction which is a possible explanation for the clinical trial's failure.

== See also ==
- Cocaine haptens – structures which elicit anti-bodies against cocaine
- TA-NIC – Similar nicotine vaccine
