= Alcohol Use Disorders Identification Test =

Questionnaire to screen patients for hazardous and harmful alcohol consumption

- Purpose: screen individuals for alcoholism

The Alcohol Use Disorders Identification Test (AUDIT) is a ten-item questionnaire approved by the World Health Organization to screen patients for hazardous (risky) and harmful alcohol consumption. It was developed from a WHO multi-country collaborative study, the items being selected for the AUDIT being the best performing of approximately 150 items including in the original survey. It is widely used as a summary measure of alcohol use and related problems. It has application in primary health care, medical clinics, and hospital units and performs well in these settings. Using different cut-off points, it can also screen for Alcohol Use Disorder (DSM-5) and Alcohol Dependence. Guidelines for the use of the AUDIT have been published by WHO and are available in several languages. It has become a widely used instrument and has been translated into approximately fifty languages.

The AUDIT consists of ten questions, all of which ask explicitly about alcohol:

1. Questions 1 to 3 ask about consumption of alcohol (frequency, quantity or typical drinking occasions, and consumption likely to cause impairment);
2. Possible dependence on alcohol (Questions 4 to 6), and
3. Harmful alcohol use, including concern expressed by others (Questions 7 to 10).

Each question is scored between 0 and 4 depending on the response and so the total score ranges between 0 and 40. Based on responses in the original WHO multi-centre study a score of 8 or more is the threshold for identifying hazardous or harmful alcohol consumption with a score of 15 or more indicating likely alcohol dependence, and 20 or more indicating likely severe dependence and harm. Using the cut-off point of 8, its performance in the original collaborative WHO study indicated a sensitivity of 92% and a specificity of 94% for the diagnoses of hazardous and harmful alcohol consumption.

The AUDIT was designed to be used internationally, and was derived from a WHO collaborative study drawing patients from six countries, representing different regions of the world and different political and economic systems. More than 300 studies have been undertaken to examine its usefulness and validity in various settings. Multiple studies have found that the AUDIT is a reliable and valid measure in identifying alcohol use disorder, hazardous consumption and harmful alcohol use (consumption leading to actual harm) and it has also been found to be a valid indicator for severity of alcohol dependence. There is some evidence that the AUDIT works in adolescents and young adults; it appears less accurate in older adults. It appears well-suited for use with college students, and also with women and members of minority groups. There has also been significant evidence for its use in the trauma patient population to screen for possible alcohol use disorders. In the trauma patient population, AUDIT has been shown to be more effective at identifying possible alcohol use disorder than physician judgement and the blood alcohol content (BAC) test.

A shorter version of the Alcohol Use Disorders Identification Test (AUDIT-C) has been created for rapid use, and is composed of the first 3-question of the full length AUDIT pertaining specifically to quantity of alcohol consumed. It is appropriate for screening for problem drinking in a doctor's office.

== See also ==
- CAGE questionnaire
- CRAFFT Screening Test
- Clinical Institute Withdrawal Assessment for Alcohol
- List of diagnostic classification and rating scales used in psychiatry
- Michigan Alcoholism Screening Test
- Paddington alcohol test
- Severity of Alcohol Dependence Questionnaire
- Substance use disorder
