= Severity of Alcohol Dependence Questionnaire =

Clinical screening tool

The Severity of Alcohol Dependence Questionnaire (SADQ or SAD-Q) is a 20 item clinical screening tool designed to measure the presence and level of alcohol dependence.

It is divided into five sections:

- Physical withdrawal symptoms
- Affective withdrawal symptoms
- Craving and relief drinking
- Typical daily consumption
- Reinstatement of dependence after a period of abstinence.

Each item is scored on a 4-point scale, giving a possible range of 0 to 60. A score of over 30 indicates severe alcohol dependence.

Some local clinical guidelines use the SADQ to predict the levels of medication needed during alcohol detoxification.

== See also ==
- Alcoholism
- Substance abuse
- AUDIT Questionnaire
- CAGE Questionnaire
- CRAFFT Screening Test
- Paddington Alcohol Test
- List of diagnostic classification and rating scales used in psychiatry
