= TA-NIC =

Vaccine in development for nicotine addiction

TA-NIC is a proprietary vaccine in development similar to TA-CD but being used to create human anti-nicotine antibodies in a person to destroy nicotine in the human body so that it is no longer effective.

TA-NIC is a vaccine in development as an aid to quitting smoking in motivated patients. TA-NIC is an immunotherapeutic vaccine similar in concept to TA-CD, designed to raise anti-nicotine antibodies. The antibodies bind to nicotine molecules in the patient's blood stream, reducing the rate and quantity of nicotine entry into the brain and thus reducing the positive reinforcement and addiction associated with nicotine and cigarette smoking. It is expected that the reduction of the positive reinforcement will in turn reduce the desire to smoke or use other tobacco products. Treatment with TA-NIC is expected to be part of a comprehensive smoking cessation management program that includes other supportive measures.

Results from its clinical trials are not publicly available, although one of its developers, Thomas Kosten, disclosed in an email that the vaccine was not found to be effective enough to continue development.
