= Paddington alcohol test =

Test designed to identify alcohol-related problems

The Paddington alcohol test (PAT) was first published in the Journal of Accident & Emergency Medicine in 1996. It was designed to identify alcohol-related problems amongst those attending accident and emergency departments. It concords well with the Alcohol Use Disorders Identification Test (AUDIT) questionnaire but is administered in a fifth of the time.

When 40–70% of the patients in an accident and emergency department (AED) are there because of alcohol-related issues, it is useful for the staff of the AED to determine which of them are hazardous drinkers so that they can treat the underlying cause and offer brief advice which may reduce the health impact of alcohol for that patient. In accident and emergency departments it is also important to triage incoming patients as quickly as possible, to reduce staff size and cost. In one study, it took an average of 73 seconds to administer the AUDIT questionnaire but only 20 seconds for the PAT.

The working version of the PAT is reviewed at St Mary's Hospital based on feedback from frontline doctors in the emergency department (A&E) (see below). There is also a modified version in use for an English multi-site programme research (Screening and Intervention Programme for Sensible Drinking, SIPS).

The latest version of the PAT is available on the UK Department of Health website, the Alcohol Learning Centre.

== See also ==
- Alcoholism
- AUDIT Questionnaire
- CAGE Questionnaire
- CRAFFT Screening Test
- List of diagnostic classification and rating scales used in psychiatry
- Severity of Alcohol Dependence Questionnaire
- Substance abuse

== Bibliography ==
- Patton R, Crawford M & Touquet R, 2005, "Hazardous drinkers in the AED – Who attends an appointment with an alcohol health worker?" Emergency Medicine Journal, 22:722–723
- Crawford M, Patton R & Touquet R et al., 2004, "Referral for brief intervention of patients misusing alcohol in an accident and emergency department: a pragmatic randomised controlled trial", The Lancet, 364:1334–1339
- Patton R, Crawford M & Touquet R, 2004, "Hazardous drinkers in the AED – Who accepts advice?", Emergency Medicine Journal, 21:491–492
