= CRAFFT Screening Test =

Clinical assessment tool

- LOINC: 71942-7

The CRAFFT is a short clinical assessment tool designed to screen for substance-related risks and problems in adolescents. CRAFFT stands for the key words of the 6 items in the second section of the assessment - Car, Relax, Alone, Forget, Friends, Trouble. As of 2020, updated versions of the CRAFFT known as the "CRAFFT 2.1" and "CRAFFT 2.1+N" have been released.

The older version of the questionnaire contains 9 items in total, answered in a "yes" or "no" format. The first three items (Part A) evaluate alcohol and drug use over the past year and the other six (Part B) ask about situations in which the respondent used drugs or alcohol and any consequences of the usage. The CRAFFT 2.1 screening tool begins with past-12-month frequency items (Part A), rather than the previous "yes/no" question for any use over the past year, and the other six (Part B) questions remain the same.

The CRAFFT can function as a self-report questionnaire or an interview to be administered by a clinician. Both employ a skip pattern: those whose Part A score is "0" (no use) answer the Car question only of Part B, while those who report any use in Part A also answer all six Part B CRAFFT questions. Each "yes" answer is scored as "1" point and a CRAFFT total score of two or higher identifies "high risk" for a substance use disorder and warrants further assessment.

== Development and history ==
The CRAFFT Screening Test was developed by John R Knight, MD and colleagues at the Center for Adolescent Behavioral Health Research (CABHRe), formerly known as the Center for Adolescent Substance Abuse Research (CeASAR) at Boston Children's Hospital. Their goal was to develop a screening tool that - like the CAGE questionnaire used for adults - was brief and easy to administer and score. Unlike the CAGE, the CRAFFT was designed to be developmentally appropriate for adolescents and screen conjointly for both alcohol and drug use. Because motor vehicle crashes are a leading cause of death among adolescents, and often associated with alcohol and drug use, the CRAFFT includes a risk item to evaluate whether an adolescent has ever ridden in a car driven by someone (including themselves) who was under the influence of alcohol or other drugs. It has been established as valid and reliable for identifying youth who need further assessment and therapeutic intervention The CRAFFT was originally designed to screen adolescents at high risk of substance use disorders in primary medical care offices. However, the necessity for a universal adolescent screening measure was made apparent by research findings suggesting that half of high school students drink, a third binge drink, and a fourth use marijuana. For drug use specifically, studies show that more than half of high school seniors have used an illegal drug of any kind and a fourth have used illegal drugs other than marijuana.^{[7] [8]} In addition, more than two-thirds of high school seniors, half of sophomores, and a third of eighth graders have used alcohol in the past year.^{[8]} These findings also contributed to the identification of a need for a tool like the CRAFFT to be developed and widely implemented.

== CRAFFT 2.1 ==
This revised version of the CRAFFT screening tool incorporates changes that enhance the sensitivity of the system in terms of identifying adolescents with substance use, and presents new recommended clinician talking points, informed by the latest science and clinician feedback, to guide a brief discussion about substance use with adolescents. The CRAFFT 2.1 provides an updated and revised version of this well-validated and widely utilized adolescent substance use screening protocol. Although the previous version of the CRAFFT will still be available, CABHRe recommends that clinicians transition to using version 2.1.

The CRAFFT 2.1 screening tool begins with past-12-month frequency items, rather than the previous "yes/no" question for any use over the past year. A recent study examining these opening yes/no questions found that they had relatively low sensitivity in identifying youth with any past-12-month alcohol or marijuana use (62% and 72%, respectively). Research also has suggested that yes/no questions may contribute to lower sensitivity on certain measures by inhibiting disclosure of less socially desirable behaviors; i.e., they may be more prone to social desirability bias.

Alternatively, questions that ask "how many" or "how often" implicitly imply an expectation of the behavior, and may thus mitigate discomfort around disclosure. The instruction, "Say '0' if none" follows each question to convey that non-use is also normative. The CRAFFT 2.1 begins with past-12-month frequency items; i.e., "During the past 12 months, on how many days did you … [drink/use substance name]?"

This new set of frequency questions was tested in a recent study of 708 adolescent primary care patients ages 12–18 that found a sensitivity of 96% and specificity of 81% for detecting past-12-month use of any substance, suggesting better performance in identifying substance use compared to that of the "yes/no" questions found in the prior study.

The CRAFFT 2.1 has been translated into the following languages: Albanian, Arabic, Burmese, Simplified Chinese, Traditional Chinese, Cape Verdean Creole, Haitian Creole, Dutch, French, German, Greek, Hebrew, Hindi, Japanese, Khmer, Korean, Laotian, Lithuanian, Nepali, Portuguese (Brazil), Portuguese (Portugal), Romanian, Russian, Somali, Spanish (Latin Am), Spanish (Spain), Swahili, Telugu, Turkish, Twi, and Vietnamese.

== CRAFFT 2.1+N ==
The CRAFFT 2.1+N expands upon the content from the CRAFFT 2.1 with the inclusion of the Hooked On Nicotine Checklist (HONC), which is a 10-item questionnaire that screens for dependence on tobacco and nicotine. If a teen indicates use of a vaping device containing nicotine and/or flavors or any tobacco products within the frequency questions, they are prompted to answer the HONC questions as well. A positive response to one or more of the items calls for further assessment regarding a serious problem with nicotine.

== Psychometrics ==
Research has shown that CRAFFT has relatively high sensitivity and specificity, internal consistency, and test-retest reliability as a screener for alcohol and substance misuse. The CRAFFT questionnaire has been validated against the current edition of the Diagnostic and Statistical Manual of Mental Disorders (DSM-5) and demonstrates good ability to distinguish between those with and without clinical levels of any DSM-5 substance use disorder. It is supported by many studies as a reliable and valid assessment of substance use and misuse in adolescents and is considered an effective tool for assessing whether further assessment is warranted. It has been well-validated against criterion standard psychological tests and structured psychiatric diagnostic interviews. It has been recommended by the American Academy of Pediatrics' Committee on Substance Abuse for use with adolescents. Findings suggest that pediatricians should regularly screen for substance use disorders in adolescents using the CRAFFT.

The CRAFFT has been translated into many languages, including Albanian, Arabic, Burmese, Simplified Chinese, Traditional Chinese, Cape Verdean Creole, Haitian Creole, Dutch, French, German, Greek, Hebrew, Hindi, Japanese, Khmer, Korean, Laotian, Lithuanian, Nepali, Portuguese (Brazil), Portuguese (Portugal), Romanian, Russian, Somali, Spanish (Latin Am), Spanish (Spain), Swahili, Telugu, Turkish, Twi, and Vietnamese. Studies attest to its validity and reliability across cultures.

== See also ==
- Alcohol use disorder
- AUDIT Questionnaire
- CAGE Questionnaire
- List of diagnostic classification and rating scales used in psychiatry
- Paddington Alcohol Test
- Severity of Alcohol Dependence Questionnaire
- Substance use disorder
