= CAGE questionnaire =

Screening tool for alcohol problems

- Purpose: assessment of problem drinking

The CAGE questionnaire, the name of which is an acronym of its four questions, is a widely used screening test for problem drinking and potential alcohol problems. The questionnaire takes less than one minute to administer, and is often used in primary care or other general settings as a quick screening tool rather than as an in-depth interview for those who have alcoholism. The CAGE questionnaire does not have a specific intended population, and is meant to find those who drink excessively and need treatment. The CAGE questionnaire is reliable and valid; however, it is not valid for diagnosis of other substance use disorders, although somewhat modified versions of the CAGE questionnaire have been frequently implemented for such a purpose.

== Overview ==
The CAGE questionnaire asks the following questions:

1. Have you ever felt you needed to Cut down on your drinking?
2. Have people Annoyed you by criticizing your drinking?
3. Have you ever felt Guilty about drinking?
4. Have you ever felt you needed a drink first thing in the morning (Eye-opener) to steady your nerves or to get rid of a hangover?

At least two positive responses indicate that the possibility of alcoholism should be investigated further.

The CAGE questionnaire, among other methods, has been extensively validated for use in identifying alcoholism. CAGE is considered a validated screening technique with high levels of sensitivity and specificity. It has been validated via receiver operating characteristic analysis, establishing its ability to screen for problem drinking behaviors.

== History ==
The CAGE questionnaire was developed in 1968 at North Carolina Memorial Hospital to combat the paucity of screening measures to detect problem drinking behaviors. The original study, conducted in a general hospital population where 130 patients were randomly selected to partake in an in-depth interview, successfully isolated four questions that make up the questionnaire today due to their ability to detect the sixteen alcoholics from the rest of the patients.

== Reliability ==
Reliability refers to whether the scores are reproducible. Not all of the different types of reliability apply to the way that the CAGE is typically used. Internal consistency (whether all of the items measure the same construct) is not usually reported in studies of the CAGE; nor is inter-rater reliability (which would measure how similar peoples' responses were if the interviews were repeated again, or different raters listened to the same interview).

Rubric for evaluating norms and reliability for the CAGE questionnaire*
| Criterion | Rating (adequate, good, excellent, too good*) | Explanation with references |
|---|---|---|
| Norms | Not applicable | Normative data are not gathered for screening measures of this sort |
| Internal consistency | Not reported | A meta-analysis of 22 studies reported the median internal consistency was α= 0.74. |
| Inter-rater reliability | Not usually reported | Inter-rater reliability studies examine whether people's responses are scored the same by different raters, or whether people disclose the same information to different interviewers. These may not have been done yet with the CAGE; however, other research has shown that interviewer characteristics can change people's tendencies to disclose information about sensitive or stigmatized behaviors, such as alcohol or drug use. |
| Test-retest reliability (stability) | Not usually reported | Retest reliability studies help measure whether things behave more as a state or trait; they are rarely done with screening measures |
| Repeatability | Not reported | Repeatability studies would examine whether scores tend to shift over time; these are rarely done with screening tests |

== Validity ==
Validity describes the evidence that an assessment tool measures what it was supposed to measure. There are many different ways of checking validity. For screening measures such as the CAGE, diagnostic accuracy and discriminative validity are probably the most useful ways of looking at validity.

Evaluation of validity and utility for the CAGE questionnaire*
| Criterion | Rating (adequate, good, excellent, too good*) | Explanation with references |
|---|---|---|
| Content validity | Adequate | Items are face valid; not clear that they comprehensively cover all aspects of problem drinking |
| Construct validity (e.g., predictive, concurrent, convergent, and discriminant validity) | Good | Multiple studies show screening and predictive value across a range of age groups and samples |
| Discriminative validity | Excellent | Studies not usually reporting AUCs, but combined sensitivity and specificity often excellent |
| Validity generalization | Excellent | Multiple studies show screening and predictive value across a range of age groups and samples |
| Treatment sensitivity | Not applicable | CAGE not intended for use as an outcome measure |
| Clinical utility | Good | Free (public domain), extensive research base, brief. |

*Table from Youngstrom et al., extending Hunsley & Mash, 2008; *indicates new construct or category

== Limitations ==
The CAGE is designed as a self-report questionnaire. It is obvious to the person what the questions are about. Because talking about drinking behavior can be uncomfortable or stigmatized, people's responses may be subject to social desirability bias. The honesty and accuracy of responses may improve if the person trusts the person doing the interview or interpreting the score. Responses also may be more honest when the form is completed online, on a computer, or in other anonymous formats.

=== Alternatives ===
Some alternatives to the CAGE include:

| Test | Description |
|---|---|
| TWEAK | A 5-item questionnaire that was originally developed for pregnant women at risk for drinking problems |
| Michigan Alcoholism Screening Test (MAST) | A 25-item scale designed to assess lifetime symptoms of alcoholism with a focus on late-stage symptoms |
| Brief MAST | Shortened 10-item version of the MAST |
| Short Michigan Alcoholism Screening Test | A second shortened version of the MAST that does not include questions pertaining physical symptoms of drinking |
| Veterans Alcoholism Screening Test | A 25-item questionnaire similar to the MAST that distinguishes between current and past symptoms |
| Alcohol Use Disorders Identification Test (AUDIT) | A 10-item scale that focuses on symptoms experienced within the past year |
| Adolescent Drinking Index | A 24-item scale developed specifically to assess the degree of an adolescent (age 12–17) individual's drinking problem |

== See also ==
- CRAFFT Screening Test
- List of diagnostic classification and rating scales used in psychiatry
- Paddington Alcohol Test
- Severity of Alcohol Dependence Questionnaire
- Substance abuse
