= Michigan Alcoholism Screening Test =

The Michigan Alcoholism Screening Test (MAST) screening tool was developed in 1971, and is one of the oldest alcoholism-screening tests for identifying dependent drinkers. Its use is constructed for the general population. There are other versions of the MAST screening tool, all of which can be self-administered or via interview with someone who is trained in the tool being used. All MAST screening tools are scored on a point scale system.

As stated on the Project Cork website, there are 25 questions to the MAST screening tool. The tool's length makes administering it inconvenient in many busy primary health care and emergency department settings. The tool also mainly focuses on the patient's problems throughout their lifetime, rather than the problems currently displayed by the patient. The questions throughout the screening tool operate in the past tense, which means that it is less likely to detect any problems with alcohol in its early stages, according to T. Buddy. The extended questioning is a benefit in a sense that one accomplishes a bit of the assessment section when conducting the screening; furthermore, it allows the individual conducting the screening to achieve better communication and rapport with the client.

The MAST-G screening tool is directed towards screening geriatric clients and has one less question than the MAST tool. There has always been an underlying concern as to the sensitivity and reliability when questioning geriatric clients.

Another related screening tool is the "brief MAST", which is much shorter than the previous tests at 10 questions. There is also the Short-MAST tool similar to the brief test; it contains 13 questions. Which tool to use is decided by the screener.
