= Molecular and epigenetic mechanisms of alcoholism =

Field of research

Alcoholism is a chronic disease characterized by trouble controlling the consumption of alcohol, dependence (needing to consume more to achieve the same effects), and withdrawal upon rapid cessation of drinking. According to ARDI reports approximately 88,000 people had alcohol-related deaths in the United States between the years of 2006 and 2010. Furthermore, chronic alcohol use is consistently the third leading cause of death in the United States. In consequence, research has sought to determine the factors responsible for the development and persistence of alcoholism. From this research, several molecular and epigenetic mechanisms have been discovered.

== Background ==
Alcoholism is characterized by a wide range of symptoms including compulsive alcohol seeking and consumption, tolerance (resistance to the effects of alcohol after repeated consumption), and withdrawal symptoms such as irritability, profuse sweating, and uncontrollable shaking upon rapid cessation of drinking. There is not a specific test for diagnosing alcoholism; however, patient questionnaires and medical screenings for ailments typically associated with alcoholism, such as cirrhosis, heart problems, and pancreatitis, are often used as diagnostic tools. Several factors influence the development of alcoholism including genetic predisposition and environmental stressors such as grief, stress, depression, and anxiety. In coordination with these factors, molecular and epigenetic mechanisms influence the progression toward alcoholism.

== Mechanisms ==
An increased propensity for alcoholism has been associated with stress-related anxiety and dysphoria, a state of general unease or dissatisfaction. The experience of various types of stress, including severe acute stress and chronic stress, can lead to the onset of dysphoria. Ethanol consumption promotes the release of dopamine into the nucleus accumbens (NAc) which is translated as a “reward". Thus, to cope with negative emotions, individuals often turn to alcohol as a form of temporary self-medication. Unfortunately, repeated ethanol use results in diminishing returns which prompts increased intake and dependence. Research has and continues to investigate the molecular and epigenetic mechanisms underlying the downward spiral of alcoholism.

=== Molecular Mechanisms ===
==== Receptors ====
Several receptors directly interact with ethanol to promote a cascade of signaling. N-methyl-D-aspartate (NMDA) receptors are glutamate receptors particularly important in long-term potentiation in neurons. These receptors have been linked to ethanol use. Acute ethanol exposure, a brief period of ethanol use, inhibits Ca2+ flow through NMDA receptors in the hippocampus, the brain structure particularly important in memory formation. A specific subunit of NMDA receptors, NR2B, shows particularly high sensitivity to ethanol as exemplified by increased NR2B expression in response to ethanol. Another family of receptors, metabotropic glutamate receptors (mGluR), may also contribute by activating MAPK pathways and increasing intracellular Ca2+. Antagonism of mGluR5 showed a decrease in ethanol consumption suggesting mGluR5's role in alcoholism. Furthermore, voltage-gated calcium channels (VGCCs) were shown to be inhibited by ethanol resulting in reduced influx of Ca2+. Yet, repeated ethanol intake, or chronic ethanol use, increases expression of the slow-inactivating L-type VGCCs known to sustain Ca2+ influx. When these channels are inhibited with an antagonist, ethanol consumption is reduced.

==== Adenylyl Cyclase ====
Adenylyl cyclase (AC) plays a role in ethanol induced signaling pathways. Acute ethanol may increase AC activity resulting in increased levels of cAMP and altered activity of cAMP targets. Of the cAMP targets, protein kinase A (PKA) has been associated with ethanol use. While acute ethanol use increases the activity of AC, chronic use tends to desensitize AC such that more simulation, increased ethanol consumption, is required to elicit the same response.

==== Kinases ====
Ethanol transduction pathways involve several protein kinases known to phosphorylate substrates linked to alcoholism, namely cAMP response element-binding protein (CREB). CREB plays a central role in ethanol responses making its activation an important step in the pathway. Some of the kinase families currently linked to alcoholism are Ca2+/calmodulin-dependent protein kinases (CaMKs), protein kinase A (PKA), and mitogen-activated protein kinases (MAPKs).

CamK

Rapid changes in Ca2+ concentration, influenced by receptors such as those described above, regulate the activity of CaMKs. Withdrawal following chronic ethanol use as well as voluntary ethanol intake, consuming ethanol when both an ethanol solution and water are offered, in rats showed a decrease in CaMKIV and consequently p-CREB. In contrast, ethanol activates CaMKII resulting in phosphorylation of CaMKII targets such as BK potassium channels.

PKA

As discussed above, cAMP levels rise following ethanol-induced activation of AC. This rise in cAMP activates PKA. In response to acute ethanol exposure, activated PKA is transported to the nucleus where it phosphorylates CREB. While chronic ethanol use has not been shown to affect the levels of the catalytic domain PKA-Cα, voluntary ethanol intake does increase PKA-Cα in the central nucleus of the amygdala (CeA) and medial nucleus of the amygdala (MeA) in P rats. The increase in PKA levels following acute ethanol use may induce negative feedback mechanisms to reduce PKA activity. Chronic ethanol exposure has been shown to reduce PKA activity in the nucleus accumbens and the amygdala due to increased levels of PKA inhibitor α.

MAPK

MAPK proteins, especially Erk1/2, have been linked to ethanol use. While there is not a consensus, acute and chronic ethanol exposure may increase p-Erk1/2 levels in the CeA and MeA of rats. In contrast, a decrease in Erk1/2 is observed during withdrawal. These patterns are mirrored in Erk1/2’s downstream target CREB and serve as a link between ethanol exposure and CREB. Erk1/2 is activated in the CeA and ventral tegmental area (VTA) by GDNF, a downstream target of CREB, which was shown to decrease ethanol consumption. This likely serves as a negative-feedback mechanism to prevent excessive ethanol use.

==== CREB ====
CREB may play a significant role in alcohol addiction. CREB is a transcription factor known to influence CNS functioning. This protein is activated by phosphorylation via the kinase families CaMK, PKA, and MAPK. CREB binds a DNA sequence called CREB Response Element (CRE) in promoter regions and activates transcription via recruitment of CREB binding protein (CBP) and other transcription factors. Some CREB-target genes, relevant for understanding alcoholism, include NPY, BDNF, Arc, and CRF. Levels of CREB and p-CREB (a highly phosphorylated CREB protein) play a dynamic role in the preference for, consumption of, and dependence on ethanol. When comparing alcohol-preferring (P) to –nonpreferring (NP) rats, lower levels of CREB, p-CREB, and CRE-DNA binding activity were observed in the CeA and MeA of P rats. In conjunction, anxiety and ethanol consumption was higher in P rats. Acute ethanol exposure increases CREB and p-CREB and decreased anxiety in only P rats. Activation of PKA in the CeA increases levels of p-CREB while decreasing anxiety and ethanol consumption in P rats. The opposite occurs in NP rats when exposed to PKA inhibitor. When rats are withdrawn from ethanol after chronic exposure they showed decreased levels of p-CREB, but not total CREB, in the CeA and MeA which manifests in anxiety-like behaviors. Furthermore, acute ethanol use increases while chronic exposure stabilizes p-CREB levels in rat cerebellum and striatum. Withdrawal following chronic exposure decreases levels of CRE-DNA binding and p-CREB.

==== CREB Targets ====
The effects of ethanol on CREB are further manifested in CREB-target genes, namely BDNF, TrkB, Arc, NPY, and CRF.

BDNF

BDNF signaling plays a role in dendritic spine formation and synaptic plasticity. The BDNF signaling pathway progresses in the following manner. After its activation, BDNF binds TrkB receptors whose subsequent activation results in dimerization and autophosphorylation of the receptor. In its phosphorylated form, TrkB receptors recruit and bind adaptor proteins which result in the activation of MAPK. As described previously, MAPK pathways activate CREB. Thus, a feed-forward mechanism leads to the ramping up of p-CREB, BDNF, and TrkB levels which leads to the creation of new set-point, higher stimulus requirements to elicit a response, and may contribute to the downward spiral of alcoholism. In support of this idea, P rats show lower baseline BDNF levels than NP rats. Furthermore, BDNF-haplodeficient mice show higher ethanol preference and decreasing BDNF levels increases ethanol consumption and anxiety. Conversely, increasing BDNF decreases ethanol intake in rats. Acute and voluntary ethanol exposure increases BDNF expression in the dorsal striatum of mice, while chronic exposure tends to decrease BDNF in the hippocampus and cortex. Withdrawal, like chronic ethanol use, is associated with decreased BDNF levels. BDNF administration into the CeA of withdrawn rats can induce anxiolytic effects associated with increased BDNF signaling, CREB activation, and increased Arc levels.

Arc

Arc is an immediate-early gene involved in the regulation of dendritic structure. It is regulated by both BDNF and CREB signaling. For example, administration of BDNF increases Arc levels and promotes dendritic spine expansion. Acute ethanol exposure in rats increases Arc levels and DSD in the CeA and MeA. In juxtaposition, chronic ethanol exposure tends to decrease DSD. Withdrawal also decreases DSD as well as decreasing Arc expression, BDNF signaling, and CREB activation. Downregulation of Arc in the CeA using antisense oligodeoxynucleotides (ODN) causes a decrease in Arc and consequently DSD accompanied by increased anxiety and ethanol consumption.Furthermore, P rats exhibit lower baseline DSD in the CeA and MeA.

NPY

NPY is a neuromodulator involved in the regulation of stress and anxiety. This molecule binds to GPCRs that lead to the inhibition of AC and thus decrease cAMP levels. While NPY decreases cAMP, it also has been shown to evoke other pathways that increase p-CREB levels. This is yet another example of a feed-forward mechanism associated with alcoholism. Ethanol consumption and anxiety are increased in NPY knockouts and decreased when NPY is overexpressed. In addition, P and HAD rats show lower NPY levels in the CeA when compared to NP and LAD rats. Modulation of the upstream regulators in the pathways discussed influence NPY and ethanol consumption. For example, inhibition of PKA with Rp-cAMP in the nucleus accumbens decreases NPY expression and increased ethanol preference. Conversely, addition of a PKA activator or NPY into the CeA decreases ethanol consumption and anxiety in P rats. In addition, while acute ethanol exposure is linked with increased NPY levels in the CeA and MeA, withdrawal and anxiety are correlated with decreased NPY levels and increased ethanol intake.

CRF

CRF is widely expressed throughout the central nervous system and is involved with stress and alcohol addiction. In contrast to NPY, CRF is a peptide that binds GPCRs (CRF-R1 and –R2) that lead to the activation of AC and consequently increase cAMP levels. CRF-R1 and –R2 appear to have opposing functions in the amygdala: while CRF-R1 antagonsim reduces ethanol consumption and anxiety-like behaviors caused by withdrawal, a CRF-R2 activation using an agonist decreases ethanol consumption. Furthermore, an increase in CRF-R1 is correlated with increased sensitivity to stress and propensity to ethanol relapse. Increased CRF levels in the amygdala are linked to both withdrawal and acute stress.

Taken together, ethanol consumption influences a wide array of molecules. Many of these are involved in feed-forward mechanisms which further promote alcohol relapse and dependence.

=== Epigenetic Mechanisms ===
In coordination with the molecules and pathways discussed, epigenetic mechanisms play a role in the development of alcoholism. These mechanisms include DNA methylation, histone acetylation and methylation, and (microRNA miRNA) action. Methylation of the DNA typically occurs at CpG sites, or a cysteine nucleotide followed by a guanine nucleotide in the 5’ to 3’ direction. These sites are common promoter and regulatory elements in mammals and methylation of cysteine residues typically inhibits these functions resulting in the repression of gene expression. DNA methylation is carried out by DNA methyltransferases (DNMTs) which are recruited to CpG sites by methyl-DNA binding proteins, such as MeCP2. Next, histones can be modified in several ways to increase or decrease gene expression. Histones are protein complexes used to package DNA into structures known as nucleosomes. The level of coiling of the DNA around histones is variable and influences transcription levels. Tight coiling, or heterochromatin, is associated with low gene expression or even silencing. Loose coiling, or euchromatin, is associated with higher levels of gene expression. Typically, acetylation of histones is associated with euchromatin formation. Acetyl groups are added by histone acetyltransferases (HATs), such as CBP. In opposition, histone deacetylases (HDACs) remove acetyl groups, typically leading to the formation of heterochromatin. HDACs are recruited by scaffolding proteins, such as RACK 1. HDAC inhibitors prevent HDAC functioning which promotes gene expression. Histone methylation, adding a methyl group to specific histone protein amino acids, can both increase or decrease gene expression depending on the histone protein, amino acid, and number of methyl groups used. Gene expression can also be inhibited post-transcriptionally by miRNA, double-stranded RNA, typically formed from hairpin structures, that is used to inhibit translation of proteins. After processing by the RNA interference (RNAi) molecules Drosha and Dicer, a single, guide-strand is loaded into the RNA induced silencing complex (RISC) which is used to bind mRNA. This binding suppresses protein synthesis and sometimes initiates mRNA degradation.

The epigenetic link to several ethanol related molecules has been established. As discussed before, acute ethanol exposure tends to increase CREB and p-CREB levels while withdrawal after chronic ethanol use is associated with decreased CREB and p-CREB. Also, CREB recruits the CBP, a HAT. Increased CREB and CBP activity at the BDNF promoter have been associated with decreased H3 methylation and increased H3 acetylation at lysine 9. In concordance, histone acetylation, particularly at the BDNF promoter II, increases BDNF expression. Similarly, BDNF exon IV expression following depolarization is increased and is associated with increased histone acetylation, reduced DNA methylation and reduced MeCP2 binding at the BDNF promoter. These changes would tend to increase BDNF expression during acute ethanol exposure. Conversely, since CREB levels and subsequent CBP recruitment fall during withdrawal, these types of epigenetic changes would likely reverse upon withdrawal after chronic ethanol use. In particular, lack of CBP likely results in decreased acetylation of the BDNF promoter. Another layer of regulation modulates the activity of MeCP2 via the protein RACK1. RACK1 at H3 and H4 inhibits MeCP2 binding and promotes histone acetylation; thus, resulting in increased BDNF expression. Chronic stress, often linked with a propensity to alcoholism, increases H3 methylation near BDNF promoters which inhibits transcription. To oppose this process, antidepressants have been shown to reduce histone methylation, increase H3 acetylation at the BDNF promoter, and reduce levels of HDAC5. Recall that HDACs remove acetyl groups and are associated with heterochromatin formation. NR2B is also influenced by epigenetic mechanisms. Recall that this NDMA receptor subunit shows increased expression after ethanol exposure. Decreased CpG methylation of the NR2B gene is associated with chronic, but not acute, ethanol exposure. Thus, the increase in NR2B expression in chronic ethanol exposed rats may be mediated by a more open chromatin structure. BK potassium channels are another target: miRNA-9 has been shown to target BK channel transcripts and may influence ethanol tolerance. This will be discussed in more detail in the tolerance section.

Finally, a link has been found between ethanol use and histone acetylation during development. After ethanol exposure, adolescent rats showed increased H3 and H4 acetylation in reward centers of the brain, such as the frontal cortex and nucleus accumbens. This effect was not seen in adult rats. Thus, brain chromatin remodeling that increases gene expression in reward centers of developing brains may contribute to an increased propensity toward alcoholism upon and after ethanol exposure.

== Tolerance ==
Tolerance is a lessened response to ethanol after repeated or prolonged ethanol exposure or consumption. In mammals, tolerance can form within minutes or over longer periods of time. Ghezzi et al. (2014) speculated that tolerance occurs due to a homeostatic mechanism that resists environmental changes. However, homeostatis does not explain how tolerance influences alcohol addiction in many cases. Epigenetic alterations, including phosphorylation, methylation, acetylation, miRNA, and chromatin remodeling, may help explain the cases not explained by homeostatic mechanisms.

These epigenetic mechanisms have been studied in rodents. Acute tolerance was shown to be controlled by changes in the BK channel's phosphorylation state. Acute tolerance is defined as ethanol tolerance that appears during an ethanol experience. Phosphorylation of BK channels by PKA is needed for ethanol potentiation of the channel. Alcohol can change the phosphorylation patterns to characterize alcohol-tolerant BK channels.

In addition, in rat magnocellular neurons it was shown that miRNA contributes to rapid and chronic ethanol tolerance by altering the expression of many proteins. Rapid tolerance is defined as tolerance produced following a single ethanol exposure. Chronic tolerance is tolerance resulting from repeated exposure. Ethanol exposure upregulates miR-9, a miRNA that binds to some BK channel mRNA transcripts in their 3'-UTR. The binding of miR-9 causes the degradation of the mRNA. The BK channel mRNAs targeted by mir-9 are those that contain an alternatively-spliced exon that has been called ALCOREX. mRNAs that contain this exon produce BK channels that respond strongly to ethanol (high potentiation channels). On the other hand, BK channel mRNA that contains the alternative exon that has been named STREX is used to produce channels that are relatively ethanol insensitive (low potentiation channels). MiR-9 specifically degrades the transcripts encoding high potentiationchannels, leaving behind mostly alcohol-resistant channels. The reason this mechanism is not used for acute tolerance is because tolerance depends on the modified protein synthesis, which takes time.

The effect histone acetylation on BK channel expression and alcohol tolerance has been studied by Ghezzi et al. (2014) using the Drosophila. The Drosophila gene that encodes BK channels is called slowpoke (slo). After ethanol sedation of the flies occurs, acetyl groups are added to histones within the slo promoter region. Acetylation exposes the slo promoter to CREB, which enhances slo protein expression. When the flies are exposed to alcohol again, it takes a shorter period of time to recover from sedation and net neural excitability is enhanced. This shows that a tolerance has been built due to increased slo product. This can also be accomplished by histone deacetylase inhibition that also causes increased slo gene expression. If the ethanol does not sedate the flies, or slo expression is not induced, tolerance does not occur.

The effect the slo gene has on tolerance appears to differ between species. For example, when slo expression increases in C. elegans, the worms become more sensitive to ethanol as opposed to in Drosophilia where a tolerance is built. While the response to increased slo expression differs, the slo gene is involved with tolerance in every species.

Whether or not tolerance and alcoholism are related is still under debate. Further work must be done in order to find a connection. The closest link between the two is that miRNA is able to regulate expression of multiple genes, and alcoholism is influenced by multiple genes. If a relationship is found, studying predisposition to alcoholism will become a possibility, which could lead to therapeutic targets for alcoholism.

== Treatment ==
=== Current Treatments ===
Treatments for alcoholism aim to end ethanol consumption and provide social support to prevent relapse. In some cases, sedating medications (benzodiazepines) may be necessary to prevent and/or reduce withdrawal symptoms. These benzodiazepines are only prescribed for a short period time to aid with withdrawal symptoms, for they too can become addictive. Some other commonly used drugs on the market include:

Disulfiram
Disulfiram (trade name Antabuse) creates a sudden acute response to ethanol consumption by inhibiting an enzyme that metabolizes ethanol. In the liver, ethanol is metabolized by alcohol dehydrogenease to produce acetaladehye which is then metabolized by acetaldehyde dehydrogenease to produce acetic acid. Disulfiram interferes with the acetaldehyde dehydrogenease preventing acetaldehyde metabolism. This buildup of acetaldehyde is responsible for immediate “hangover” effects such as vomiting, nausea, and headaches.

Naltrexone

Naltrexone (trade name Revia) is an opioid antagonist that is thought to work by interfering with the dopaminergic mesolimbic (or reward) pathway associated with risk-reward evaluation in the brain. This pathway starts at the ventral tegmental area and makes its way to the nucleus accumbens. Addictions of many drugs, including ethanol is commonly linked to this pathway. Naltrexone is thought to block or attenuate opioid stimulation.

Acamprosate

Acamprosate (trade name Campral) is believed to stabilize chemical balances in the brain that ethanol withdrawal would normally induce. In chronic ethanol users, ethanol binds to GABA receptors causing the down-regulation of GABA receptors; which are now less sensitive to the inhibitory GABA neurotransmitter. Acamprosate is thought to act as a GABA agonist that relieves anxiety associated with ethanol withdrawal, thereby promoting the discontinue use of ethanol.

These drug treatments are often coupled with social support through counseling, rehabilitation centers, and support groups. These social systems aid in dealing with the underlying social and psychological issues related to ethanol addiction.

=== Future Epigenetic-Based Treatments ===
==== HDAC Inhibitors ====
Chronic alcohol use up-regulates HDACs through oxidative stress in the brain; this leads to decreased histone acetylation and decreased NPY expression, especially in the amygdala. The lower levels of NPY are associated with increased ethanol consumption and increased anxiety in periods of ethanol withdrawal. Trichostatin A (TSA) is an HDAC inhibitor which has been shown to reverse these histone acetylation and NPY deficits by preventing and reversing HDAC up-regulation. TSA acted as an anxiolytic as it was able to reduce anxiety associated with ethanol withdrawal.

Suberanilohydroxamic Acid or SAHA is an HDAC inhibitor that reduces the motivation of rats to consume and/or seek ethanol, SAHA reduced binge drinking in rats by ending ethanol consumption periods sooner than in non-SAHA rats. SAHA was selective for reducing ethanol seeking but not sucrose seeking.

==== DNMT Inhibitors ====
In alcoholics, certain regions of the amygdala are associated with higher levels of DNA methyltransferases. 5-azacitidine (5-AzaC) in mice reduced excessive ethanol consumption. 5-AzaC decreases DNA methylation by inhibiting the activity of DNA methyltransferases. These results suggest ethanol consumption increases DNMT activity and that this histone modification can be reversed by DNMT inhibitors.
