= Carbohydrate deficient transferrin =

Medical laboratory test

Carbohydrate-deficient transferrin
- LOINC: 12949-4, 13999-8

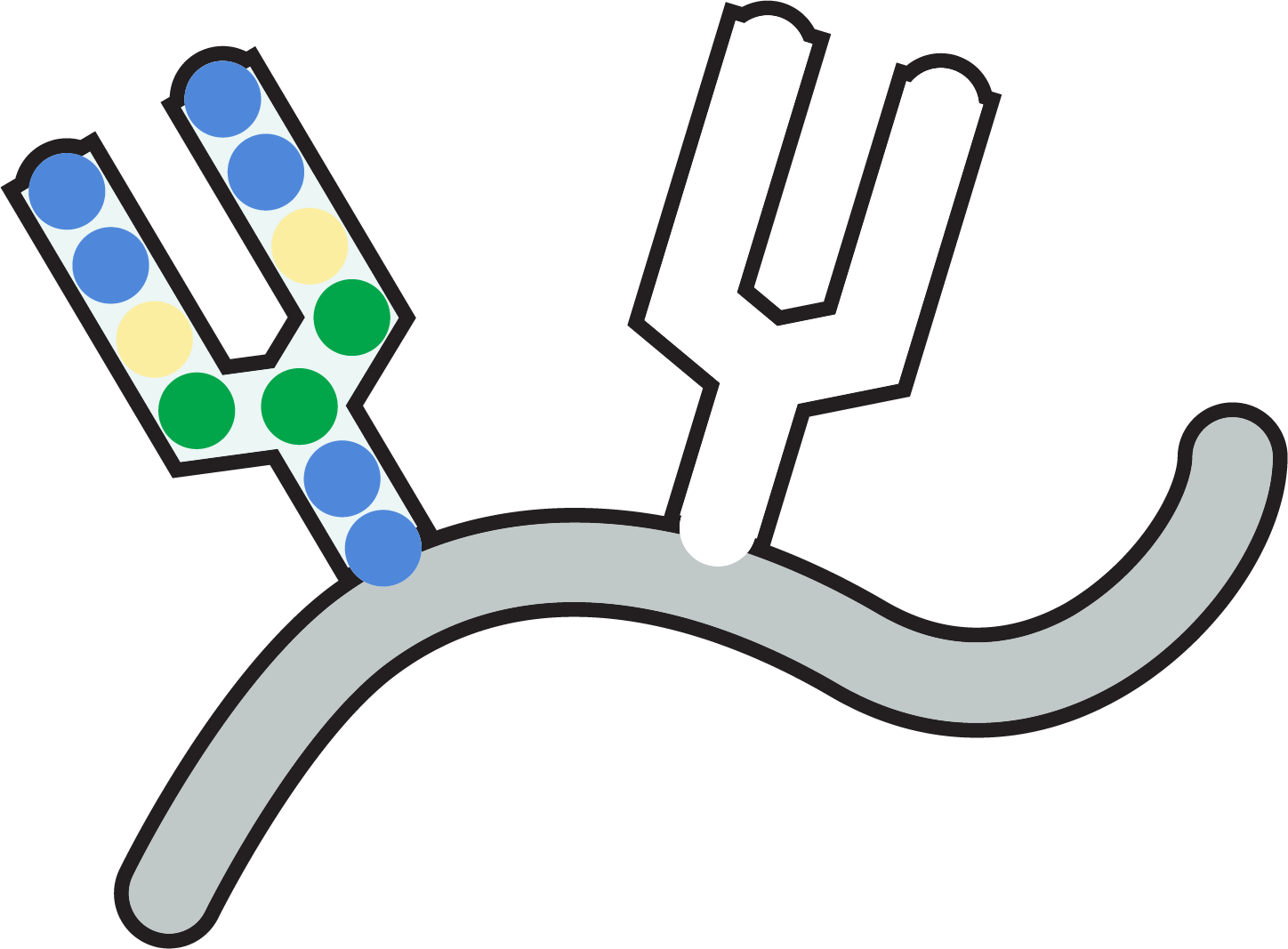
Carbohydrate Deficient Transferrin glycoproteins

Carbohydrate-deficient transferrin (CDT, also known as desialotransferrin or asialotransferrin) is a laboratory test used to help detect heavy ethanol consumption.

== Test for alcohol consumption ==
Carbohydrate-deficient transferrin is elevated in the blood of people with heavy alcohol consumption but elevated levels can also be found in a number of medical conditions. The limitations of the assay depend upon the methodology of the test. HPLC (High Performance Liquid Chromatography) can detect certain genetic variants and potential liver diseases affecting CDT.

Used with other tests, such as gamma glutamyl transferase (GGT), aspartate aminotransferase (AST), and alanine aminotransferase (ALT), carbohydrate-deficient transferrin can be a useful tool in identifying problem drinking, such as alcohol use disorder. However, it is less sensitive than phosphatidylethanol (PEth) in detecting current regular alcohol consumption.

The ethanol conjugates called ethyl glucuronide and ethyl sulfate remain detectable for up to three days after ethanol consumption and are quite useful for detection of occult/denied alcohol use disorder. Both these substances are detectable clinically through urine drug testing by commercial toxicology labs.

CDT is measured by taking a sample of a patient's blood. Apparently healthy individuals with no or low reported alcohol consumption and a negative Alcohol Use Disorders Identification Test (AUDIT) will have a %CDT <1.7% (95th percentile for the social drinking population). Elevated levels of CDT suggest recent heavy alcohol consumption, especially if other liver-associated enzymes (such as GGT) are elevated. Although recent heavy alcohol use is most commonly associated with elevated CDT, certain rare liver disorders can also increase levels of CDT. CDT levels are less useful for detecting alcohol use disorder in people with other liver diseases.
