= Alcohol Dependence Data Questionnaire =

- Synonyms: SADD
- Purpose: measure alcohol dependence

The Alcohol Dependence Data Questionnaire (SADD) is a treatment evaluation instrument is used to measure an individual's current level of alcohol dependence. The evaluation was created by Raistrick D. S., Dunbar G., and Davidson R. J. in 1983. The evaluation is aimed at adults who have a mild to moderate dependence on alcohol and are seeking help.

The SADD was designed to be quick, with it being a 15 item questionnaire that may be self administered or administered through a structured interview. The items on the evaluation ask about the drinking habits of the patient as well as the physical and mental effects of their drinking. Each item is scored on a scale of 0 to 3, giving the evaluation a range of 0 to 45. A score of 1-9 is indicative of a low dependence on alcohol, a score of 10-19 is indicative of a moderate dependence on alcohol, and a score of 20 or greater is indicative of a high dependence on alcohol.

Alcohol dependence syndrome is the physical or psychological need for consuming alcohol. This syndrome was given its name by Edward and Gross, the creators of the Severity of Alcohol Dependence Questionnaire (SADQ). The Short Alcohol Dependence Data Questionnaire is based on alcohol dependence syndrome and how severe the participant's dependence is.

Criteria:

- Strong desire or compulsion for alcohol
- Difficulties in controlling substance-taking behaviors
- Withdrawal
- Tolerance
- Neglect of other interests
- Continuing substance use despite harmful consequences

The Severity of Alcohol Dependence Questionnaire (SADQ) was the first assessment tool created to measure alcohol dependence and was created by Edwards and Gross. This instrument was created to assess alcohol dependence in a simplified manner for people seeking help for their alcohol dependence. The Severity of Alcohol Dependence Questionnaire contains twenty questions and is rated on a frequency scale from one to four. There are five sections covered in the SADQ, which are: physical withdrawal signs (PHYS), affective withdrawal signs (AFF), withdrawal relief drinking (NEED), quantity and frequency of alcohol consumption (ALC), and the rate at which withdrawal symptoms start after a period of non-consumption (POSTAB). Within these five sections, there are four items that evaluate the criteria for alcohol dependence. The questionnaire gave a score between 0 and 60. Based on the score, participants received feedback anywhere from mild to severe dependence. A score of 35 or over is considered to be severe dependence issues, and 30 or under is considered mild or moderate dependence. The Severity of Alcohol Dependence Questionnaire mainly focuses on the physical and psychological symptoms of withdrawal and how they are relieved through the consumption of alcohol. There is evidence that this assessment has strong internal validity and reliability in addressing how severe a person's alcohol dependence is.

Aspects Covered:

- physical withdrawal symptoms
- affective withdrawal symptoms
- relief drinking
- frequency of alcohol consumption
- speed of onset of withdrawal symptoms

SEVERITY OF ALCOHOL DEPENDENCE QUESTIONNAIRE

The Alcohol Dependence Data (ADD) was developed by Raistrick et al. to evaluate the degree of alcohol dependence in a self-given questionnaire that contained 39 questions. From the Alcohol Dependence Data came the shortened version, the Short Alcohol Dependence Data Questionnaire (SADD). The shortened version of the Alcohol Dependence Data Questionnaire has the same validity as the original, it just makes the process simpler.
