= Alcohol tolerance =

Bodily responses to the functional effects of ethanol within alcoholic beverages

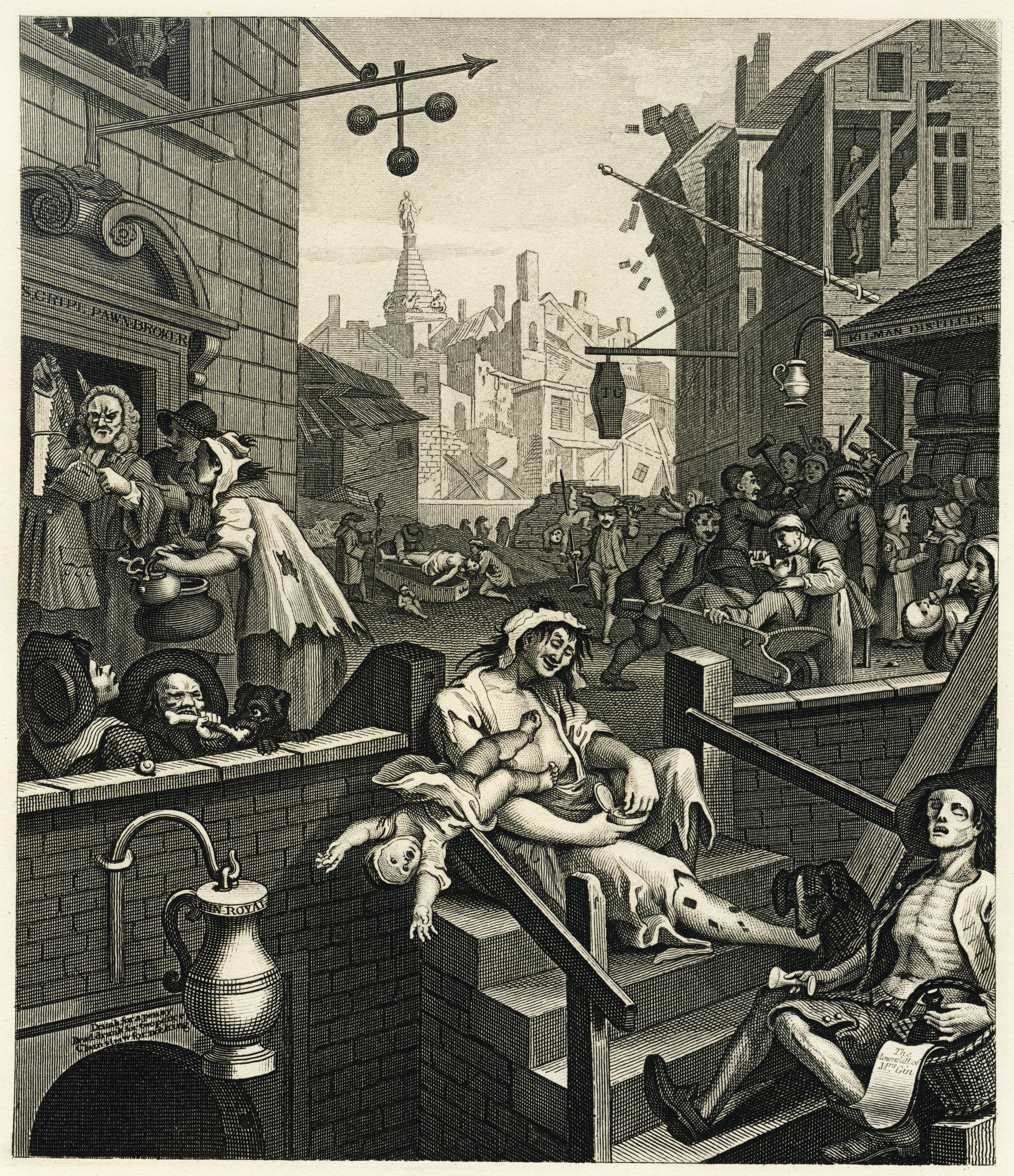
Beer Street and Gin Lane by William Hogarth, 1751, detailing the Gin Craze in UK cities during the early Industrial Revolution.

Alcohol tolerance refers to the bodily responses to the functional effects of ethanol. This includes direct tolerance, speed of recovery from insobriety and resistance to the development of alcohol use disorder.

== Consumption-induced tolerance ==
Alcohol tolerance is increased by regular drinking. This reduced sensitivity to the physical effects of alcohol consumption requires that higher quantities of alcohol be consumed in order to achieve the same effects as before tolerance was established. Alcohol tolerance may lead to (or be a sign of) alcohol dependence.

Heavy alcohol consumption over a period of years can lead to "reverse tolerance". A liver can be damaged by chronic alcohol use, leading to a buildup of fat and scar tissue. The reduced ability of such a liver to metabolize or break down alcohol means that small amounts can lead to a high blood alcohol concentration (BAC) and more rapid intoxication. Studies have shown that 2–3 weeks of daily alcohol consumption increases tolerance.

== Physiology of alcohol tolerance ==
Alcohol dehydrogenase is a dimeric zinc metalloenzyme that catalyzes the reversible oxidation of alcohols to aldehydes

Direct alcohol tolerance is largely dependent on body size. Large-bodied people will require more alcohol to reach insobriety than lightly built people. The alcohol tolerance is also connected with activity of alcohol dehydrogenases (a group of enzymes responsible for the breakdown of alcohol) in the liver, and in the bloodstream.

High level of alcohol dehydrogenase activity results in fast transformation of ethanol to more toxic acetaldehyde. Such atypical alcohol dehydrogenase levels are less frequent in alcoholics than in non-alcoholics. Furthermore, among alcoholics, the carriers of this atypical enzyme consume lower ethanol doses, compared to the individuals without the allele.

An estimated one out of twenty people have an alcohol flush reaction. It is not in any way an indicator for the drunkenness of an individual. A mild flushing reaction occurs when the body metabolizes alcohol more quickly into acetaldehyde, a toxic metabolite. A more severe flushing reaction occurs when the body metabolizes the acetaldehyde more slowly, generally due to an inactive aldehyde dehydrogenase enzyme. Both of those conditions—faster conversion of alcohol to acetaldehyde and slower removal of acetaldehyde—reduce the risk for excessive drinking and alcohol dependence.

== Alcohol tolerance in different ethnic groups ==
To engage in alcohol consumption and the development of an alcohol use disorder appear to be common to primates, and is not a specific human phenomenon. Humans have access to alcohol in far greater quantity than non-human primates, and the availability increased, particularly with the development of agriculture. The tolerance to alcohol is not equally distributed throughout the world's population. Genetics of alcohol dehydrogenase indicate resistance has arisen independently in different cultures. In North America, Native Americans have the highest probability of developing an alcohol use disorder compared to Europeans and Asians. Different alcohol tolerance also exists within Asian groups, such as between Chinese and Koreans. The health benefits of a modest alcohol consumption reported in people of European descent appears not to exist among people of African descent.

Higher body masses and the prevalence of high levels of alcohol dehydrogenase in an individual increase alcohol tolerance, and both adult weight and enzymes vary with ethnicity. Not all differences in tolerance can be traced to biochemistry, however. Differences in tolerance levels are also influenced by socio-economic and cultural difference including diet, average body weight and patterns of consumption.

== In animals ==
Ethanol is caloric but highly intoxicating for most animals, which typically tolerate only up to 4% in their diet. However, a 2024 study found that oriental hornets fed sugary solutions containing 1% to 80% ethanol for a week showed no adverse effects on behavior or lifespan.
