= Pink elephant =

Pink Elephant or Pink Elephants may refer to:

- "Seeing pink elephants", a euphemism for a drunken hallucination
- The Pink Elephant Paradox, another name for Ironic Process Theory.
- Pink Elephant (film), a 1975 cartoon from the Pink Panther series
- Pink Elephants (film), a cartoon produced by the Terrytoons studio
- Pink Elephants, a 1997 album by Mick Harvey
- Pink Elephant (Arcade Fire album), 2025
- Pink Elephant (N'Dambi album), 2009
- Pink Elephant (Stand Atlantic album), 2020
- "Pink Elephant", a song by the Cherry Poppin' Daddies from Rapid City Muscle Car
- Pink Elephant (cigarette), a Dutch brand
- "The Pink Elephant", a nickname for El Monte Legion Stadium

== See also ==
- "Pink Elephants on Parade", a segment and a song from Dumbo
- White elephant (animal), whose actual color is pinkish
