= Alcohol detoxification =

Abrupt cessation of alcohol intake

Table from the 2010 DrugScience study ranking various drugs (legal and illegal) based on statements by drug-harm experts. This study rated alcohol the most harmful drug overall, and the only drug more harmful to others than to the users themselves.

Alcohol detoxification (also known as detox) is the abrupt cessation of alcohol intake in individuals that have alcohol use disorder. This process is often coupled with substitution of drugs that have effects similar to the effects of alcohol in order to lessen the symptoms of alcohol withdrawal. When withdrawal does occur, it results in symptoms of varying severity.

As such, the term "detoxification" may be somewhat of a misnomer since the process need not refer exclusively to the removal of toxic substances from the body. Detoxification may or may not be indicated depending upon an individual's age, medical status, and history of alcohol intake. For example, a young man who binge drinks and seeks treatment one week after his last use of alcohol may not require detoxification before beginning treatment for alcohol use disorder.

Some addiction medicine practitioners use the term "withdrawal management" instead of "detoxification".

== Withdrawal symptoms ==
The symptoms of alcohol withdrawal can range from mild to severe depending on the level of alcohol dependence a person has experienced. Symptoms can be behavioural (anxiety, agitation, irritability), neurological (tremor, hallucinations, increased risk of seizures), and physical (changes in heart rate, body temperature, blood pressure, nausea). Symptoms typically occur between 6 and 24 hours since cessation of drinking. In severe cases delirium tremens may occur, which is a medical emergency and could result in death.

== Management ==
Benzodiazepines are the most common family of drugs used for alcohol detoxification, followed by barbiturates.

=== Benzodiazepines ===
Benzodiazepines such as chlordiazepoxide (Librium), diazepam (Valium), lorazepam (Ativan) or oxazepam (Serax) are the most commonly used drugs used to reduce alcohol withdrawal symptoms. There are several treatment patterns in which it is used:

1. The first option takes into consideration the varying degrees of tolerance. In it, a standard dose of the benzodiazepine is given every half-hour until light sedation is reached. Once a baseline dose is determined, the medication is tapered over the ensuing 3 to 10 days.
2. Another option is to give a standard dose of benzodiazepine based on history and adjust based on withdrawal phenomenon.
3. A third option is to defer treatment until symptoms occur. This method should not be used in patients with prior, alcohol-related seizures. This has been effective in randomized controlled trials. A non-randomized, before and after, observational study found that symptom-triggered therapy was advantageous.

Dosing of the benzodiazepines can be guided by the CIWA scale. The scale is available online.

Regarding the choice of benzodiazepine:

- Chlordiazepoxide (Librium) is the benzodiazepine of choice in uncomplicated alcohol withdrawal due to its long half-life.
- Lorazepam or diazepam is available as an injection for patients who cannot safely take medications by mouth.
- Lorazepam and oxazepam are indicated in patients with impaired liver function because they are metabolised outside of the liver.

=== Nitrous oxide ===
Nitrous oxide has been shown to be an effective and safe treatment for alcohol withdrawal. Over 20,000 cases of the alcoholic withdrawal state have been successfully treated with psychotropic analgesic nitrous oxide (PAN) in South Africa and Finland. In 1992 it was officially approved for the treatment of addictive withdrawal states by the medical authorities in South Africa. Consequently, patients receiving it can claim a refund from their medical insurance. The gas therapy reduces the use of highly addictive sedative medications (like benzodiazepines and barbiturates) by over 90%. The technique thus reduces the danger of secondary addiction to benzodiazepines, which can be a real problem amongst alcoholics who have been treated with these agents.

=== Other ===
Benzodiazepines remain first-line therapy for alcohol-withdrawal syndrome (AWS). Several non-benzodiazepine options may be used as adjuncts or, in selected cases, alternatives, but none replace benzodiazepines for preventing seizures or delirium unless otherwise specified.

==== Adjuncts for autonomic hyperactivity (α_{2}-agonists and β-blockers) ====
Alpha-2 adrenergic agonists (e.g., clonidine; in intensive-care settings, dexmedetomidine) and β-blockers (e.g., atenolol, metoprolol) can be used as adjuncts to control tachycardia and hypertension when these persist despite adequate benzodiazepines. They should not be used as monotherapy for AWS and do not prevent withdrawal-related seizures or delirium. Contemporary reviews similarly describe dexmedetomidine only as an adjunct in severe or benzodiazepine-resistant cases.

==== Anticonvulsants (carbamazepine, gabapentin, valproate) ====
Non-benzodiazepine anticonvulsants have a limited but useful role. Carbamazepine or gabapentin may be used for mild–moderate AWS (including ambulatory care) or as adjuncts when benzodiazepines are contraindicated or insufficient; they can also serve as a bridge into longer-term AUD treatment in some patients. A Cochrane review found no clear overall advantage of anticonvulsants over benzodiazepines, though carbamazepine may improve some symptom scores; overall data quality is mixed and further trials are needed. Valproate should not be used as monotherapy for AWS and is generally avoided in pregnancy and significant liver disease.

==== Phenobarbital ====
In monitored settings and when used by clinicians experienced with its dosing, phenobarbital can be an alternative to benzodiazepines (including monotherapy in selected settings) or an adjunct for severe/complicated or benzodiazepine-resistant withdrawal. Recent reviews support its usefulness within protocolized care, while emphasizing the need for close monitoring given its narrow therapeutic window.

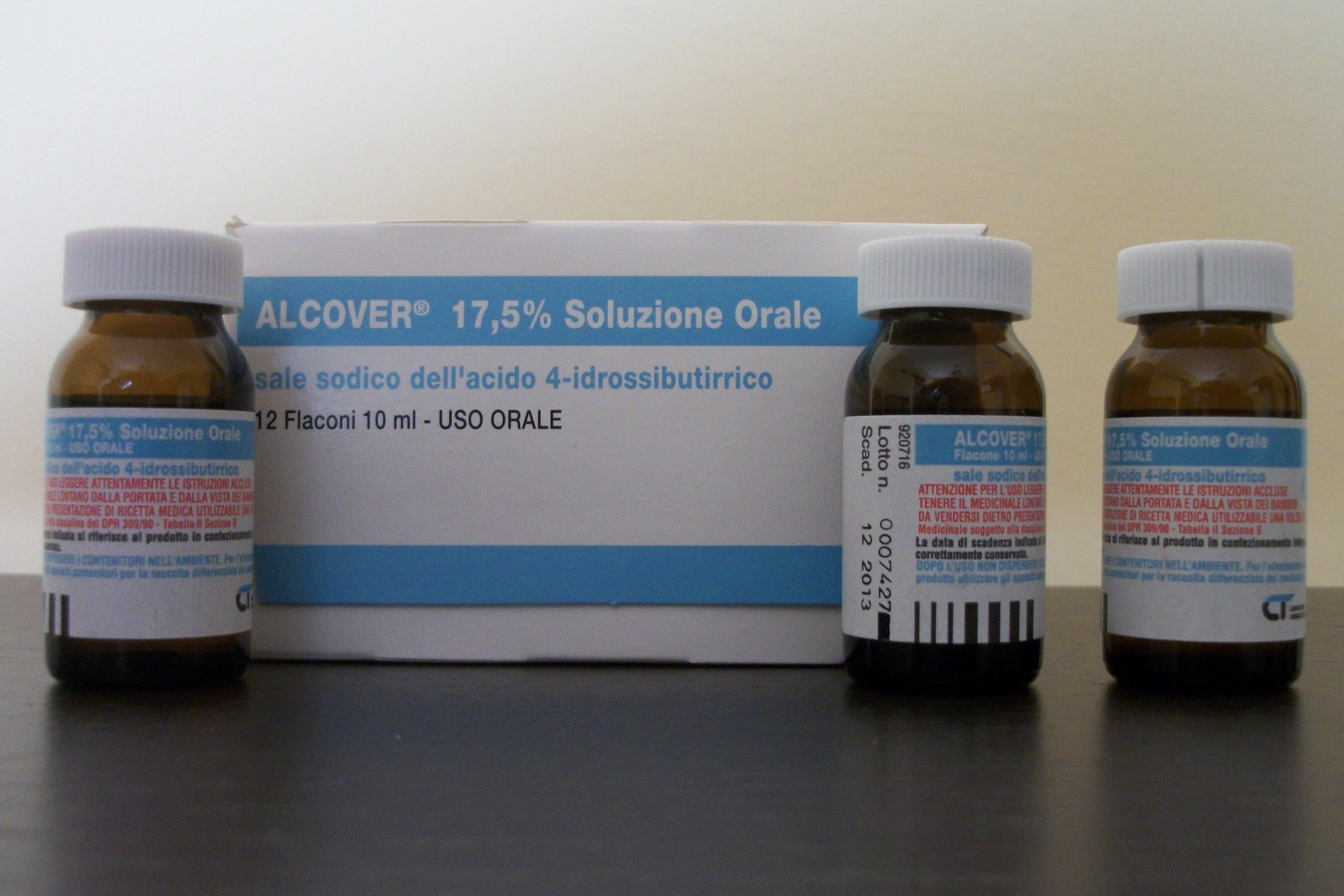
GHB sold in Italy for therapeutic use

==== Sodium oxybate (gamma-hydroxybutyric acid) ====
Sodium oxybate is approved in Italy and Austria for managing AWS and for relapse prevention in alcohol dependence. Randomized and observational studies suggest efficacy for AWS and maintenance of abstinence; however, concerns about misuse/abuse potential and regulatory variability limit its use outside specialized programs. In 2025, the European Medicines Agency began a safety and efficacy review of sodium-oxybate–containing products used for alcohol dependence, reflecting ongoing benefit–risk assessment.

== See also ==
- Drug detoxification
- Detoxification, the process, real or perceived, of removing toxins from the body.
