= Delirium tremens =

Rapid onset of confusion caused by alcohol withdrawal

- Other names: Alcohol-induced delirium
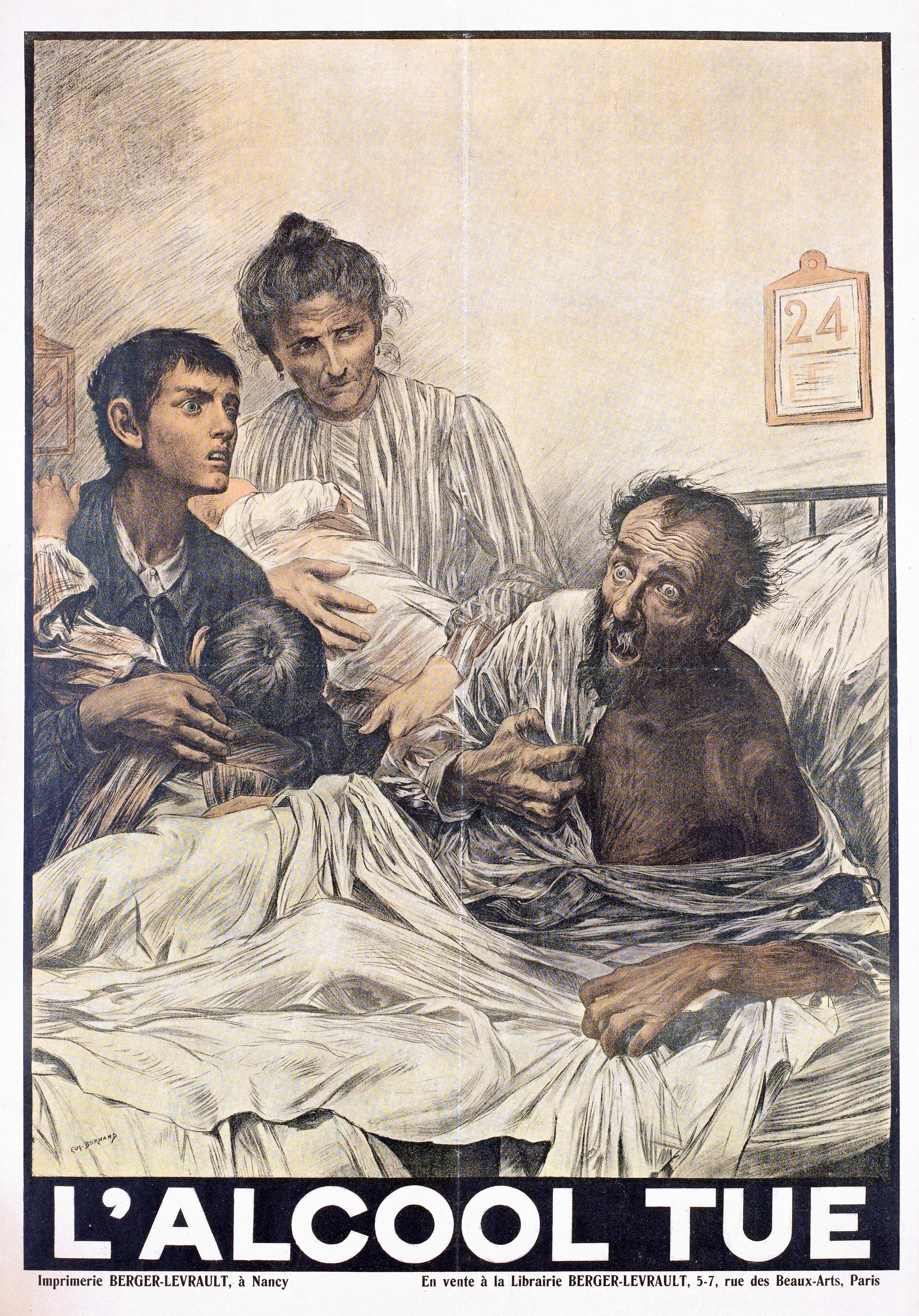
- An alcoholic man with delirium tremens on his deathbed, surrounded by his concerned family. The text L'alcool tue means "Alcohol kills" in French.
- Specialty: Toxicology, addiction medicine, intensive care medicine, psychiatry
- Symptoms: Hallucinations, confusion, shaking, shivering, irregular heart rate, sweating
- Complications: Very high body temperature, seizures
- Usual onset: Rapid, 48-72 hours after last drink
- Duration: 1–8 days
- Causes: Abrupt cessation of alcohol intake in a state of alcohol dependence
- Differential diagnosis: Benzodiazepine withdrawal syndrome, barbiturate withdrawal
- Treatment: Intensive care unit, benzodiazepines, thiamine
- Prognosis: Risk of death ~2% (treatment), 25% (no treatment)
- Frequency: ~4% of those withdrawing from alcohol

Delirium tremens (DT; literally "trembling delirium") is a rapid onset of confusion caused by withdrawal from alcohol. DT typically occurs 48–72 hours after the last use of alcohol and symptoms last 1–8 days. Typical symptoms include nightmares, confusion, disorientation, heavy sweating, elevated heart rate, and elevated blood pressure. Visual, auditory, and tactile hallucinations are also common. DT can be fatal especially without treatment. Occasionally, a very high body temperature or seizures (colloquially known as "rum fits") may result in death. Other causes of death include respiratory failure and cardiac arrhythmias.

Delirium tremens typically occurs only in people with a high intake of alcohol for prolonged periods of time, followed by sharply reduced intake. A similar syndrome may occur with benzodiazepine and barbiturate withdrawal; however, the term delirium tremens is reserved for alcohol withdrawal. In a person with delirium tremens, it is important to rule out other associated problems such as electrolyte abnormalities, pancreatitis, and alcoholic hepatitis.

Prevention is by treating withdrawal symptoms using similarly acting compounds to taper off the use of the precipitating substance in a controlled fashion. If delirium tremens occurs, aggressive treatment with benzodiazepines improves outcomes. Treatment in a quiet intensive care unit with sufficient light is often recommended to re-orient the patient. Benzodiazepines are the medication of choice with short acting compounds including lorazepam and oxazepam commonly used, which bypass the liver. These medications are typically given in response to the patient's symptoms, rather than at regular intervals. Nonbenzodiazepines are often used as adjuncts to manage the sleep disturbance associated with condition. The antipsychotic haloperidol may also be used in order to combat the overactivity and possible excitotoxicity caused by the withdrawal from a GABA-ergic substance. Antipsychotics, however, are not used alone as they may increase the risk of seizure. Thiamine (vitamin B_{1}) is recommended to be given intramuscularly, because long-term high alcohol intake and the associated nutritional deficit leads to a thiamine deficiency, which sometimes cannot be rectified by supplement pills alone.

Mortality without treatment historically has been between 15% and 40%. With improvements in treatment over the years, currently death occurs in about 1% to 4% of cases.

About half of people with alcoholism will develop withdrawal symptoms upon reducing their use. Of these, 3% to 5% develop DTs or have seizures.

The name delirium tremens was first used in 1813; however, the symptoms were well described since the 1700s. The word "delirium" is Latin for "going off the furrow", a plowing metaphor for disordered thinking. It is also called the shaking frenzy and Saunders-Sutton syndrome. There are numerous nicknames for the condition, including "the DTs" and "seeing pink elephants".

== Signs and symptoms ==
The main symptoms of delirium tremens are nightmares, agitation, global confusion, disorientation, visual and auditory hallucinations, tactile hallucinations, seizures, fever, high heart rate, high blood pressure, heavy sweating, and other signs of autonomic hyperactivity. These symptoms typically develop 48–72 hours after the last use of alcohol and symptoms typically last 1–8 days.

The symptoms of alcohol withdrawal are often characterized using the Clinical Institute Withdrawal Assessment for Alcohol tool otherwise known as "CIWA Protocol" which includes symptoms like nausea, sweating, tremors, headache, agitation, tactile disturbances, and changes in vision or hearing. A score is given based on the severity of symptoms. A score of greater than 15 increases the likelihood of developing delirium. A systolic blood pressure of greater than 150 mmHg and pulse greater than 100 beats per minute are also signs of severe withdrawals.

These symptoms are characteristically worse at night. For example, in Finnish, this nightlike condition is called liskojen yö, lit. 'the night of the lizards', for its sweatiness, general unease, and hallucinations tending towards the unseemly and frightening. Although this term is not medically recognized, it describes visual and tactile hallucinations often including animals and insects that are common in DT.

In general, DT is considered the most severe manifestation of withdrawal from alcohol and can occur between the second and tenth days after the last drink. It often overcomes the patient by surprise, because a brief period of uneventful sobriety of 1–2 days tends to precede it.

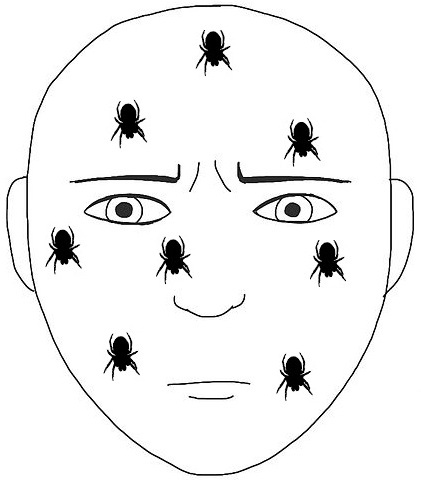
Tactile hallucination of imaginary spiders crawling on skin, also known as formication.

Other common symptoms include intense perceptual disturbance such as visions or feelings of insects, snakes, or rats. These may be hallucinations or illusions related to the environment, e.g., patterns on the wallpaper or in the peripheral vision that the patient falsely perceives as a resemblance to the morphology of an insect, and are also associated with tactile hallucinations such as sensations of something crawling on the subject—a phenomenon known as formication. Delirium tremens usually includes feelings of "impending doom". Anxiety and expecting imminent death are common DT symptoms.

DT can sometimes be associated with severe, coarse tremors of the extremities mostly in the hands. Secondary symptoms include anxiety, panic attacks, and paranoia.

DT should be distinguished from alcoholic hallucinosis, the latter of which occurs in approximately 20% of hospitalized alcoholics and does not carry a significant risk of mortality. In contrast, DT occurs in 3-5% of those hospitalized with alcohol withdrawal and has a 1-4% mortality rate. In the past, death rates reached up to 15-35% without treatment, but treatment has significantly improved survival. The most common conditions leading to death in patients with DTs are respiratory failure and cardiac arrhythmias.

== Causes ==
There is no exact amount of alcohol that precipitates delirium tremens, but it is most common after abrupt stopping after heavy, prolonged periods of drinking. More than 20 drinks per day increases the risk of DT; however, it can occur with fewer drinks as well. Withdrawal from other drugs like benzodiazepines or barbiturates may cause similar symptoms, but the term delirium tremens is reserved for alcohol withdrawal.

== Pathophysiology ==
Delirium tremens is a component of alcohol withdrawal hypothesized to be the result of compensatory changes in response to chronic heavy alcohol use. Alcohol binds to and activates GABA, causing depression of the central nervous system and sedation. This results in inhibition of neurons projecting into the nucleus accumbens, as well as inhibiting NMDA receptors. This combined with desensitization of alpha-2 adrenergic receptors, results in upregulation of these systems in chronic alcohol use.

When alcohol use ceases, the unregulated mechanisms result in hyperexcitability of neurons as natural GABAergic systems are down-regulated and excitatory glutamatergic systems are upregulated. This combined with increased noradrenergic activity results in the symptoms of delirium tremens including seizures, tremors, anxiety, confusion, and hallucinations.

== Diagnosis ==
Diagnosis is mainly based on symptoms. According to the DSM-5, alcohol withdrawal is diagnosed after a cessation or reduction in heavy, prolonged alcohol use followed by the development of at least two of the following symptoms: autonomic hyperactivity (elevated heart rate, elevated blood pressure, etc.), increased hand tremor, insomnia, nausea/vomiting, hallucinations or illusions, psychomotor agitation, anxiety, and generalized seizures. Scoring criteria including CIWA is useful to anticipate withdrawal and to estimate severity, but it is not used for diagnosis. In a person with delirium tremens, it is important to rule out other associated problems, such as electrolyte abnormalities, pancreatitis, and alcoholic hepatitis.

== Treatment ==
The treatment of choice for delirium tremens is benzodiazepines. High doses may be necessary to prevent death. The preferred treatment is giving these medications in response to the patient's symptoms, rather than at scheduled intervals. Short acting benzodiazepines including lorazepam and oxazepam are commonly used as they are not processed by the liver, which can be dangerous in patients with alcoholism with significant liver disease.

In some cases, antipsychotics such as haloperidol may also be used to further control symptoms like agitation and confusion. Antipsychotics should never be used alone in delirium tremens as they may increase the risk of seizures. Older drugs such as paraldehyde and clomethiazole were formerly the traditional treatment but have now largely been superseded by benzodiazepines.

A number of hospitals are now switching to barbiturates, namely Phenobarbital, over treatment with benzodiazepines. In a quality improvement study comparing outcomes before (154 patients) and after (100 patients) implementation, 67% of postimplementation patients were treated using the phenobarbital order set, which was associated with faster symptom resolution (4.2- to 5.0-point Clinical Institute Withdrawal Assessment of Alcohol Scale Revised score reduction from 24-96 hours), reduced AWS treatment duration (30.1 hours), shorter hospital stay (2.2 days), and no increase in adverse events.

It can also be helpful to provide a well lit room to reorient the patient and reduce confusion.

Alcoholic beverages were given in the past, but this practice is no longer supported.

High doses of thiamine, often by the intravenous route, is also recommended to prevent Wernicke's encephalopathy, as low thiamine levels are very common in heavy alcohol use.

== Society and culture ==
=== Film and TV ===
In the 1945 film The Lost Weekend, Ray Milland won the Academy Award for Best Actor for his depiction of a character who experiences delirium tremens after being hospitalized, hallucinating that he saw a bat fly in and eat a mouse poking through a wall.

The M*A*S*H TV series episode "Bottoms Up" (season 9, episode 15, aired on March 2, 1981) featured a side story about a nurse (Capt. Helen Whitfield) who was found to be drinking heavily off-duty. By the culmination of the episode, after a confrontation by Maj. Margaret Houlihan, the character swears off alcohol and presumably quits immediately. At mealtime, roughly 48 hours later, Whitfield becomes hysterical upon being served food in the mess tent, claiming that things are crawling onto her from it. Margaret and Col. Sherman Potter subdue her. Potter, having recognized the symptoms of delirium tremens orders 5 ml of paraldehyde from a witnessing nurse.

During the filming of the 1975 film Monty Python and the Holy Grail, Graham Chapman developed delirium tremens due to the lack of alcohol on the set. It was particularly bad during the filming of the bridge of death scene where Chapman was visibly shaking, sweating and could not cross the bridge. His fellow Pythons were astonished as Chapman was an accomplished mountaineer.

In the 1995 film Leaving Las Vegas, Nicolas Cage plays Ben Sanderson, a suicidal alcoholic who rids himself of all his possessions and travels to Las Vegas to drink himself to death. During his travels, he experiences delirium tremens on a couch after waking up from a binge and crawls in pain to the refrigerator for more vodka. Cage's performance in the film won him the Academy Award for Best Actor in 1996.

=== Literature ===
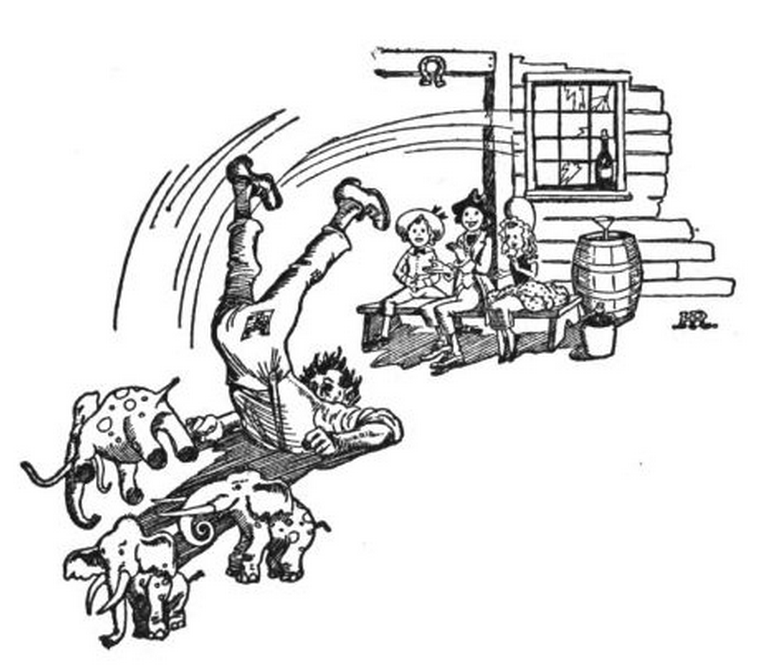
A drawing by Donald Ogden Stewart published in 1921 of a man with delerium tremens seeing pink elephants

The character of Coupeau in French writer Émile Zola's novel The Drinking Den (L'Assommoir) experiences delirium tremens by the end of the book.

In English writer Mona Caird's novel The Daughters of Danaus (1894), "[a]s for taking enfeeblement as a natural dispensation", the character Hadria "would as soon regard delirium tremens in that light."

American writer Mark Twain describes an episode of delirium tremens in his book The Adventures of Huckleberry Finn (1884). In Chapter 6, Huck states about his father, "After supper pap took the jug, and said he had enough whisky there for two drunks and one delirium tremens. That was always his word." Pap Finn runs around with hallucinations of snakes and chases Huck around their cabin with a knife in an attempt to kill him, thinking that Huck is the "Angel of Death".

One of the characters in Joseph Conrad's novel Lord Jim experiences "DTs of the worst kind" with symptoms that include seeing millions of pink frogs.

English author M. R. James mentions delirium tremens in his 1904 ghost story "'Oh, Whistle, and I'll Come to You, My Lad'". Professor Parkins, while staying at the Globe Inn in coastal Burnstow to "improve his game" of golf despite being "a convinced disbeliever in what is called the 'supernatural'", is heard "uttering cry upon cry at the utmost pitch of his voice" though later "was somehow cleared of the ready suspicion of delirium tremens".

American writer Jack Kerouac details his experiences with delirium tremens in his book Big Sur.

English author George Eliot provides a case involving delirium tremens in her novel Middlemarch (1871–72). Alcoholic scoundrel John Raffles, both an abusive stepfather of Joshua Riggs and blackmailing nemesis of financier Nicholas Bulstrode, dies, whose "death was due to delirium tremens" while at Peter Featherstone's Stone Court property. Housekeeper Mrs. Abel provides Raffles' final night of care per Bulstrode's instruction whose directions given to Abel stand adverse to Tertius Lydgate's orders.

=== Music ===
Irish singer-songwriter Christy Moore's satirical song "Delirium Tremens" from his 1985 album Ordinary Man addresses Irish political and cultural leaders, including Charles Haughey (former Fianna Fáil leader), Ruairi Quinn (a Labour TD, later the party leader), Dick Spring (former Labour Party leader) and Roger Casement (who was captured bringing German guns to Ireland for the 1916 Easter Rising). English band Brotherly has a song titled "DTs" on their album One Sweet Life. Fito Páez and Joaquín Sabina have a song titled "Delirium Tremens" on their 1998 collaborative album Enemigos Íntimos.

Russian composer Modest Mussorgsky (1839-1881) died of delirium tremens.

=== Popular culture ===
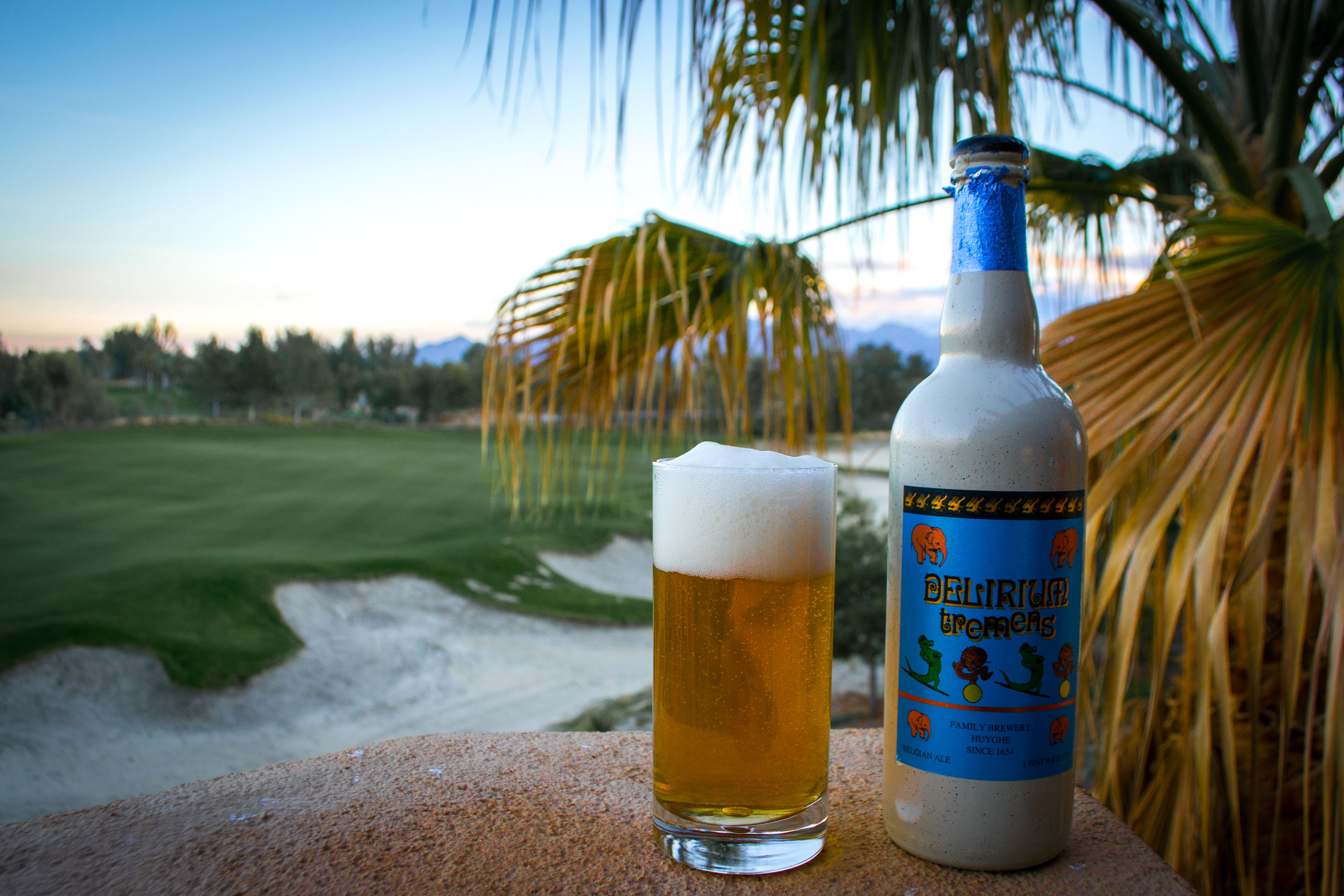
Huyghe Brewery's flagship beer is Delirium Tremens, a golden ale.

Nicknames for delirium tremens include "the DTs", "the shakes", "the oopizootics", "barrel-fever", "the blue horrors", "the rat's", "bottleache", "bats", "the drunken horrors", "seeing pink elephants", "gallon distemper", "quart mania", "janky jerks", "heebie jeebies", "pink spiders", and "riding the ghost train", as well as "ork orks", "the zoots", "the 750 itch", and "pint paralysis". Another nickname is "the Brooklyn Boys", found in Eugene O'Neill's one-act play Hughie set in Times Square in the 1920s. Delirium tremens was also given an alternate medical definition since at least the 1840s, being known as mania a potu, which translates to 'mania from drink'.

The Belgian beer Delirium Tremens, introduced in 1988, is a direct reference and also uses a pink elephant as its logo to highlight one of the symptoms of delirium tremens.

== See also ==
- Alcohol dementia
- Alcohol detoxification
- Delusional parasitosis
- Excited delirium
- On the wagon
