= Dumbo (soundtrack) =

Dumbo (Original Motion Picture Soundtrack)

Film score by Danny Elfman
- Released: March 29, 2019
- Recorded: 2017–2019
- Studios: AIR, London
- Genre: Film score
- Length: 60:56
- Label: Walt Disney

Danny Elfman chronology
The Grinch (2018)	Dumbo (2019)	Men in Black: International (2019)

Singles from Dumbo (Original Motion Picture Soundtrack)
- 1. "Baby Mine" Released: March 11, 2019

Dumbo (Original Motion Picture Soundtrack) is the soundtrack to the 2019 film Dumbo directed by Tim Burton, which is a live-action adaptation and reimagining of Walt Disney's 1941 film of the same name. The film's soundtrack features musical score composed by Danny Elfman and songs from the original film. The album was released through Walt Disney Records digitally on March 29, 2019 and physically on April 26.

== Background ==
Burton's norm composer Danny Elfman assigned to score music for Dumbo. Despite his norm practice of writing the score during production and post-production, Elfman wrote a musical piece even before the production began and did not read the script. Instead, he thought of an idea of a baby elephant and his mother being separated, with the theme being "something innocent and sweet and sad", he wrote the particular piece with 20 minutes and made a demo of it. During post-production, Burton found his demo music and eventually discovered that the piece suited the film resulting in the cue being unchanged and served as the main theme. He deciphered it as a combination of bittersweet music being frivolous and light as well as more triumphant and grandeur. For the film, Elfman had recorded source music—a process he was doing for the first time—for the circus and its clowns. Despite focusing on a dramatic music, Elfman's liking to circus and carnivals felt that it added color and flavor to the score. The score pays homage to Frank Churchill and Oliver Wallace's music from the original film.

The original film's song "Baby Mine" had two versions—the first being performed in the film by Sharon Rooney, who played Miss Atlantis, and the end-credits version performed by Arcade Fire. Norwegian singer Aurora also covered the song for the film's trailer, though it was not featured in the actual film. Instrumental versions of the songs "Casey Junior", "When I See an Elephant Fly", and "Pink Elephants on Parade" from the original Dumbo are also included in the 2019 film.

== Release ==
The soundtrack was preceded with Arcade Fire's version of "Baby Mine" as a single on March 11, 2019. The album was unveiled digitally on March 29, 2019, alongside the film, and followed by a physical release on April 26, 2019.

== Reception ==
Anton Smit of Soundtrack World described the music as "a true gem". Zanobard Reviews assigned 8/10 to the album, summarising "Dumbo is a welcome return to classic Burton-esque Danny Elfman, complete with a memorable main theme, some truly incredible individual compositions and spectacular orchestration all-round." Writing for MFiles, Jim Paterson summarised "While the score isn't a full-on classic Elfmanfest, it is thoroughly well crafted with many moments to enjoy." Christy Lemire of RogerEbert.com attributed that the film's music is "frequently reminiscent of Elfman's haunting score for Edward Scissorhands". Scott Mendelson of Forbes called it as "relatively unshowy".

== Track listing ==
All music is composed by Danny Elfman, except where noted.

Dumbo (Original Motion Picture Soundtrack) track listing
No.	Title	Writer(s)	Artist	Length
1.	"Logos / Intro"			0:59
2.	"Train's a Comin'" (quotes "Casey Junior", written by Frank Churchill and Ned Washington)			2:05
3.	"The Homecoming"			2:40
4.	"Meet the Family"			2:29
5.	"Stampede!"			3:35
6.	"Baby Mine"	Frank Churchill and Ned Washington	Sharon Rooney	1:44
7.	"Dumbo's Theme"			2:31
8.	"Clowns 1"			1:01
9.	"Vandevere's Arrival"			1:25
10.	"Dumbo Soars"			1:25
11.	"Happy Days"			1:00
12.	"Goodbye Mrs. Jumbo"			1:40
13.	"Photographs / First Flight"			2:25
14.	"Colosseum"			0:21
15.	"Pink Elephants on Parade (2019)"	Oliver Wallace and Washington		1:48
16.	"Colette's Theme"			1:06
17.	"First Rehearsal"			2:55
18.	"Clowns 2"			0:39
19.	"Nightmare Island"			3:46
20.	"Dumbo in Hell"			1:10
21.	"Holt in Action"			0:52
22.	"Searching for Milly"			2:29
23.	"The Breakout"			3:08
24.	"Rescuing the Farriers"			1:40
25.	"The Final Confrontation"			4:58
26.	"Medici Circus / Miracles Can Happen"			4:21
27.	"Baby Mine"	Churchill and Washington	Arcade Fire	2:57
28.	"Soaring Suite"			2:41
29.	"Carnival Music"			1:06
Total length:				60:56

== Personnel ==
Credits adapted from production notes.

- Music composer and producer – Danny Elfman
- Musical arrangements – Chris Bacon, TJ Lindgren
- Engineer – Peter Cobbin, Noah Snyder
- Assistant engineer – Alex Ferguson Natasha Canter
- Recordist – Chris Barrett, Laurence Anslow
- Mixing – Dennis Sands
- Mix recordist – Adam Olmstead
- Additional mixing – Kirsty Whalley
- Mastering – Patricia Sullivan
- MIDI controller – Marc Mann
- Music editor – Bill Abbott, Lisa Jaime, Simon Changer
- Assistant music editor – Arabella Winter, Denise Okimoto
- Musical assistance – Melissa Karaban
- Technical assistance – Mikel Hurwitz
- Executive producer – Tim Burton
- Music supervisor – Mike Higham
- Score production supervisor – Melisa McGregor
- Choir – Metro Voices, Tiffin Boys School
- Orchestration – David Slonaker, Edgardo Simone, Ed Trybek, Pete Anthony
- Supervising orchestrator – Steve Bartek
- Orchestra and choir conductor – Rick Wentworth
- Orchestra leader – Thomas Bowes
- Contractor – Amy Stewart, Isobel Griffiths Ltd.
- Concertmaster – Jenny O'Grady, James Day
- Music librarian – Dakota Music, Dave Hage, Jake Parker
- Cello (solo) – Caroline Dale
- Cornet and trumpet (solo) – James Fountain
- Tuba (solo) – Adrian Miotti

== Charts ==
Chart performance for Dumbo (Original Motion Picture Soundtrack)
Chart (2019)	Peak position
UK Soundtrack Albums (OCC)	12

== Accolades ==
Accolades for Dumbo (Original Motion Picture Soundtrack)
Ceremony	Category	Recipient(s)	Result	Ref.
International Film Music Critics Association	Best Original Score for an Action/Adventure/Thriller Film	Danny Elfman	Nominated	
Saturn Awards	Best Music	Danny Elfman	Nominated	
