= Don't Worry, He Won't Get Far on Foot (soundtrack) =

2018 film soundtrack album

Don't Worry, He Won't Get Far on Foot (Original Motion Picture Soundtrack)

Film score by Danny Elfman
- Released: July 13, 2018
- Studio: Studio Della Morte, Los Angeles; Falcon Recording Studios, Portland, Oregon
- Genre: Film score
- Length: 42:06
- Label: Sony Classical
- Producer: Danny Elfman; Gus Van Sant; Melisa McGregor; Noah Snyder

Danny Elfman chronology
Fifty Shades Freed (2018)	Don't Worry, He Won't Get Far on Foot (2018)	The Grinch (2018)

Don't Worry, He Won't Get Far on Foot (Original Motion Picture Soundtrack) is the film score to the 2018 film Don't Worry, He Won't Get Far on Foot directed by Gus Van Sant starring Joaquin Phoenix, Jonah Hill, Jack Black and Rooney Mara. The original score is composed by Danny Elfman and was released through Sony Classical Records on July 13, 2018.

== Development ==
Danny Elfman reunited with his frequent collaborator Gus van Sant for Don't Worry, He Won't Get Far on Foot, which was their eighth film they worked together. He considered the working relationship with Gus, mostly with the trust he ensured with him that led to their collaboration on seven films irrespective of the budget and scale. Considering John Callahan's story as fascinating, Elfman added that Joaquin Phoenix playing the character intrigued him even more, having liked his acting abilities. Elfman did not have any preconceived ideas for the story and had a blank state of mind, discussing with the director and the team as well as watching the complete film.

During the initial discussions, Gus stated about the characters of the film, which helps Elfman to provide rough ideas and Gus' liking to experiment things led Elfman to follow suit. He recalled that there was instances on doing jazz music and a jazz piece was featured in the opening titles, which he felt really happy. Elfman further recalled that some pieces which he wrote for a particular scene was included by Gus in another scene. He added that a lullaby which was titled "Oliver's Lullaby" was written when his son was born. Gus selected that piece and included in certain points of the film.

Like his older films, Elfman often visited the sets of the production to borrow ideas for his music after witnessing the production. The score utilizes piano, guitars, string quartet and vocals by Petra Haden. Elfman liked the collaboration between Petra, as she was comfortable and free to work with and experiment with her vocals and improvise it, for a creative environment. Because of monetary constraints, the producers did not afford for an orchestra, but ended up utilizing a string quartet instead of using synthesizers as orchestra for a cost-effective approach, because it would provide a cheesy sound and reeminded of his early attempts at television to sound like film.

== Reception ==
Filmtracks was critical of the score, saying "though, this soundtrack is a collection of loosely affiliated ideas from Elfman's restrained, modern dramas of the previous ten years, and the "throw it all at the wall and see what sticks" approach won't work for listeners aside from those dedicated to this mode from the composer" especially in consideration with Callahan's journey, "the music has no beginning, middle, or end, simply pontificating moment to moment without a story to tell of its own." In contrast, Peter Debruge of Variety called it "one of the warmest scores of Danny Elfman's career". Hannah Strong of Little White Lies called it a "tinkly score". Tim Gilmer of New Mobility wrote "Danny Elfman's edgy jazz score, while sparse, sets a fitting tone." Zachary Sosland of Mxdwn Movies wrote "Danny Elfman composes the music for Don't Worry and it's probably one of his better works in recent years as it elevates several of the film's more emotional moments."

Peter Travers of Rolling Stone called in a "ebullient" score. David Edelstein of Vulture called it "a stupendous score from Danny Elfman that's largely bebop but with alternately eerie and comforting orchestral noodling". Pam Nadon of Your Observer wrote "Danny Elfman's jazzy scoring is paired perfectly with John's sporadic misadventures." Steve Macfarlane of Slant Magazine wrote "Danny Elfman's generic score is laid over far too many scenes". Tom Shone of The Times called it as "one of Danny Elfman's prismatic, gently uplifting scores". Simran Hans of Sight and Sound called it "over-emphatic". Peter Stuart of Den of Geek wrote "Danny Elfman's soundtrack does a great job of charting the journey into sobriety and sketching". Donald Clarke of The Irish Times called it "a classy Danny Elfman score that alternates free bop with tinkled piano chords".

== Track listing ==
No.	Title	Length
1.	"Don't Worry, He Won't Get Far on Foot" (Main Title)	1:46
2.	"1st Drink"	1:02
3.	"Phone Call"	2:11
4.	"Car Crash"	1:19
5.	"Stuck in the Tracks"	0:43
6.	"Out of Reach"	1:59
7.	"The Kids, Pt. 1"	0:32
8.	"Mother's Name"	1:03
9.	"The Liquor Store"	0:40
10.	"Annu"	0:44
11.	"The Hospital Bed" (composed by Alex Somers)	2:20
12.	"Steps"	1:47
13.	"Drawing Montage"	3:13
14.	"Gymnasts"	0:36
15.	"Showing Off"	1:07
16.	"Donnie is Sick"	2:44
17.	"John's Speech"	2:03
18.	"Weepy Donuts"	2:28
19.	"The Kids, Pt. 2"	1:55
20.	"Good News"	0:42
21.	"12th Step"	3:04
22.	"Texas When You Go" (John Callahan)	3:36
23.	"Auntie Tia" (Danny and the Hillbilly Boyz)	2:48
24.	"Don't Worry, He Won't Get Far on Foot" (ALT Main Title)	1:47
25.	"Good News" (Piano Solo)	1:03
26.	"The Hospital Bed, Pt. 2" (Alex Somers)	2:25
Total length:		45:37

== Personnel ==
Credits adapted from liner notes:

- Music composer – Danny Elfman
- Music producer – Danny Elfman, Gus Van Sant, Melisa McGregor, Noah Snyder
- Additional music – Alex Somers
- Orchestration – Edgardo Simone, Marc Mann, Steve Bartek
- Conductor – Marc Mann
- Vocals – Petra Haden
- Recording and mixing – Noah Snyder, Ryan Hopkins
- Mastering – Patricia Sullivan
- Score editor – Sally Boldt
- Music production supervisor – Melisa McGregor
- Technical assistance – Mikel Hurwitz
- Musical assistance – Melissa Karaban
- Graphic Design – WLP Ltd.
- Liner notes – Gus Van Sant
- Artwork – John Callahan
- Soundtrack acquisitions and licensing (Sony Classical) – Mark Cavell
- Product development (Sony Classical) – Jennifer Liebeskind
