= Black Devil (cigarette) =

Dutch cigarette brand

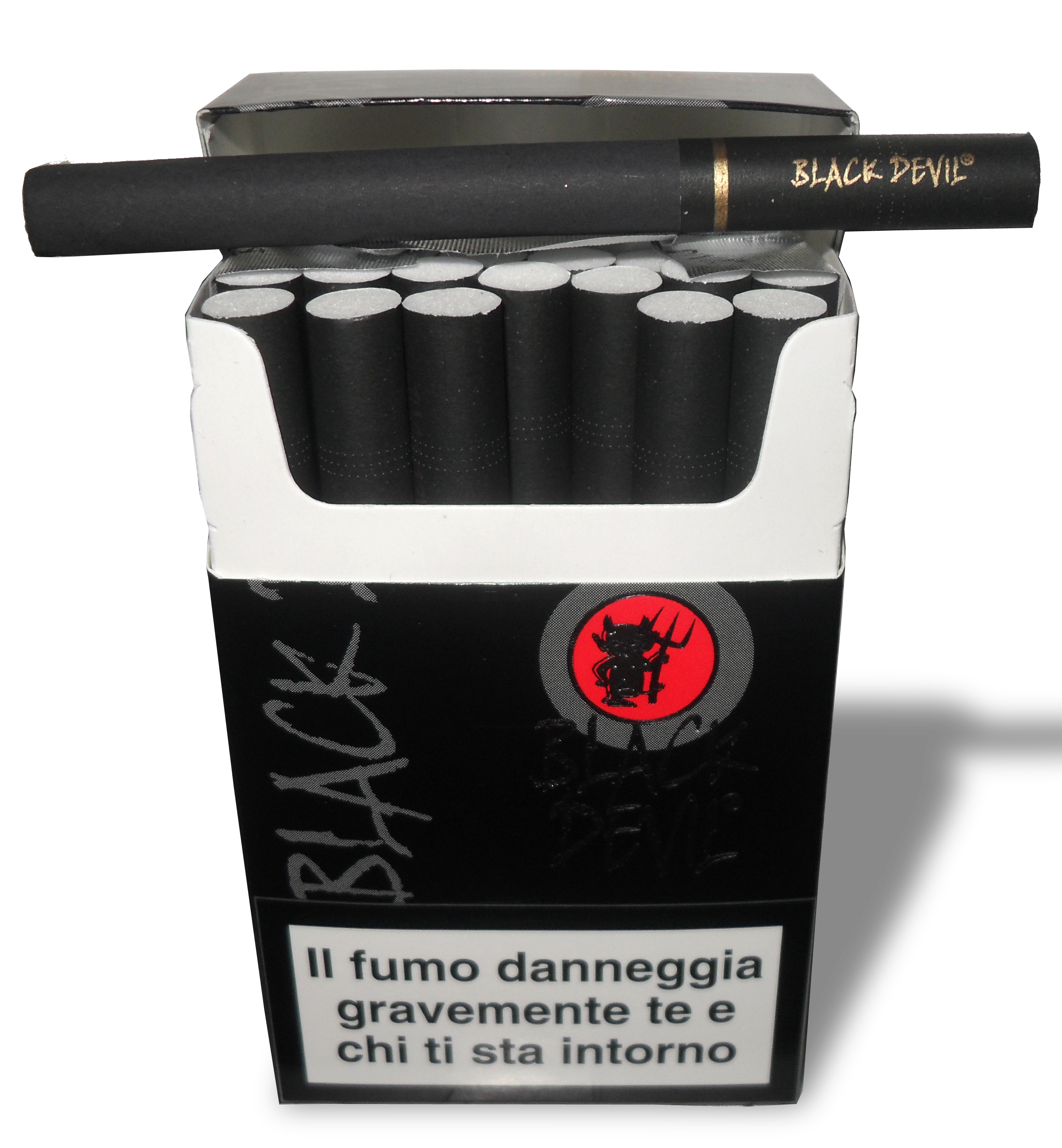
- A pack of vanilla-flavored Black Devil cigarettes, with an Italian-text warning at its base
- Product type: Cigarette
- Current owner: Heupink & Bloemen
- Country: Netherlands
- Markets: See #Markets

Black Devil is a Dutch brand of cigarettes, currently owned and manufactured by Heupink & Bloemen.

== In France ==
Since March 2010, flavoured cigarettes are no longer sold in France in a bid by the French government to combat youth smoking.

== Markets ==
Black Devil cigarettes are sold in the following countries:

- Belgium
- Mozambique
- Germany
- Switzerland
- Sweden
- Austria
- Italy
- Poland
- Slovenia
- Latvia
- Russia
- Spain
- Israel
- Myanmar
- Taiwan
- South Korea
- Mongolia
- Ukraine
- Japan
- Australia

They were formerly sold in Portugal, Bulgaria and the Netherlands.

== See also ==
- Pink Elephant (cigarette) – Dutch cigarette brand
- Tobacco smoking – Burning tobacco and inhaling the smoke
