= Before I Wake (soundtrack) =

Before I Wake (Original Motion Picture Soundtrack)

Film score by Danny Elfman and the Newton Brothers
- Released: January 26, 2018
- Recorded: 2014–2017
- Studios: Raleigh Studios, Hollywood, Los Angeles; TBR Studio, Sheffield; Eastpole Studios, London
- Genre: Film score
- Length: 67:55
- Label: Varèse Sarabande
- Producers: James Gibb; Robert Townson (exec.)

Danny Elfman chronology
Justice League (2017)	Before I Wake (2018)	Fifty Shades Freed (2018)

The Newton Brothers chronology
Gerald's Game (2017)	Before I Wake (2018)	Family Blood (2018)

Before I Wake (Original Motion Picture Soundtrack) is the film score to the 2016 film Before I Wake directed by Mike Flanagan. The original themes were provided by Danny Elfman, who also composed additional music, while the score was composed by the Newton Brothers. It was released under the Varèse Sarabande label on January 26, 2018.

== Background ==
Danny Elfman composed the themes for the film, while also providing additional music for few of the cues. The original score was composed by the Newton Brothers, who developed on the themes curated by Elfman. They worked on the film for around three years since 2014. The duo noted that working with Elfman was a fun-filled experience, with Elfman having a collection of instruments that gave them inspiration for providing numerous ideas.

== Release ==
The soundtrack was released through Varèse Sarabande on January 26, 2018, three weeks after the film's Netflix release. Additionally, the album was pressed into a limited-edition of 1000 copies through physical release.

== Reception ==
Filmtracks wrote "Elfman in top dramatic form and The Newton Brothers showing glimpses of hope amongst their nightmare of stock horror techniques." Brian Tallerico of RogerEbert.com called it as a "great score". Courtney Howard of Fresh Fiction described it an "enticing, complementary score from the Newton Brothers and Danny Elfman" Sharai Bohannon of Dread Central noted that Elfman's and the duo's score breathes life into this film. Noel Murray of The Verge wrote "the score by Danny Elfman and the Newton Brothers effectively manipulates the audience, enhancing the magical qualities of Cody's gifts before driving home the sting." The New Indian Express called it an "understated score".

== Track listing ==
No.	Title	Music	Length
1.	"Somnia"	The Newton Brothers	1:59
2.	"A New Home"	The Newton Brothers	1:14
3.	"Flashback"	The Newton Brothers	1:02
4.	"Cody"	The Newton Brothers	2:51
5.	"Monarchs"	The Newton Brothers	0:54
6.	"First Day Of School / Afraid To Sleep"	The Newton Brothers	2:44
7.	"Lighterflies"	The Newton Brothers	1:32
8.	"Someone's Here"	The Newton Brothers	1:41
9.	"Cody And Annie"	The Newton Brothers	1:02
10.	"Family Portrait"	The Newton Brothers	1:48
11.	"Sean"	Danny Elfman	2:01
12.	"I'm Sorry"	The Newton Brothers	1:19
13.	"The Life Cycle Of Butterflies"	The Newton Brothers	2:12
14.	"Memories Of Sean"	The Newton Brothers	1:45
15.	"Christmas"	Danny Elfman	2:01
16.	"I'm Always With You"	The Newton Brothers	1:54
17.	"The Bully"	The Newton Brothers	1:19
18.	"Asleep In Class"	The Newton Brothers	2:26
19.	"I'm Awake, This Can't Be Happening"	The Newton Brothers	1:34
20.	"Missing Kid"	The Newton Brothers	1:12
21.	"Zolpidem"	The Newton Brothers	1:15
22.	"Come To Bed"	The Newton Brothers	1:32
23.	"Taken Away"	The Newton Brothers	1:42
24.	"He Won't Wake Up"	The Newton Brothers	2:14
25.	"Cody's Past"	The Newton Brothers	1:27
26.	"What Happens When He Dreams?"	The Newton Brothers	6:52
27.	"He Needs To Sleep"	The Newton Brothers	3:10
28.	"Something's In The Bathroom"	The Newton Brothers	2:27
29.	"Nightmares"	The Newton Brothers	2:48
30.	"Defeated"	Danny Elfman	9:58
Total length:			67:55

== Personnel ==
Credits adapted from liner notes:

- Original themes and additional music composed by – Danny Elfman
- Original score composed by – The Newton Brothers
- Recording and mixing – Matt Ward
- Score editor – Jeff Carson, Jim Harrison
- Score coordinator – Becca Nelson
- Executive producer – Robert Townson
- Music supervisor – Dave Curtin
- Musical assistance – Wyatt Baer
- Associate producer – James Gibb
- Copyist – Ryan Whyman
- Orchestra and choir – F.A.M.E.S. Macedonian Symphony Orchestra
- Orchestration – Jason Turbin, Steve Bartek
- Music business and legal affairs – Charles M. Barsamian
- Music clearance and licensing – Chris Piccaro
- Music services – Cutting Edge
- Piano – George Ramirez, The Newton Brothers
- Electric cello, clarinet, bass guitar, e-bow, glockenspiel – The Newton Brothers
- Solo violin – Sandy Cameron
- Vocals – Sunna Wehrmeijer
