= Men in Black: International (score) =

Men in Black: International (Original Motion Picture Score)

Film score by Danny Elfman and Chris Bacon
- Released: June 7, 2019
- Recorded: 2018–2019
- Studios: Sony Scoring Stage, Sony Pictures Studios, Culver City, California
- Genre: Film score
- Length: 54:27
- Label: Sony Classical
- Producers: Danny Elfman; Chris Bacon; Noah Snyder

Danny Elfman chronology
Dumbo (2019)	Men in Black: International (2019)	Dolittle (2020)

Chris Bacon chronology
Sherlock Gnomes (2018)	Men in Black: International (2019)	Super Gidget (2019)

Men in Black: International (Original Motion Picture Score) (Note: also marketed and released as MIB International (Original Motion Picture Score)) is the score album to the 2019 film Men in Black: International directed by F. Gary Gray, a standalone sequel and the fourth instalment in the Men in Black franchise. The film's musical score is composed by Danny Elfman and Chris Bacon and released through Sony Classical Records on June 7, 2019.

== Development ==
Danny Elfman, who scored the previous Men in Black films, returned for International. His protégé and fellow composer Chris Bacon, who worked with Elfman on co-producing and arranging his scores, served as the co-composer. He felt it as a pleasure to return to the franchise, as it allowed him "to visit this unique musical world where I’m combining retro and contemporary music in a playful way". Like his previous films, Elfman reused the themes and melodies from the predecessor while also wrote new themes for this film, adding that it was a "sonic element that feels fresh but really delivers an element that the audience would love to hear".

The eventual combination was a result of a brass, percussion and string music that is featured in his composition "Viper Room". Elfman wanted to provide a theme for Molly/Agent M (Tessa Thompson) as her journey is part of an emotional connection with the audience, and also as she was a newcomer in the team. However, he did not do the same for Henry/Agent H (Chris Hemsworth) fearing that it would clutter the score, in the same way as the protagonists of their original franchise, Agent J (Will Smith) and Agent K (Tommy Lee Jones) as Henry was part of the Men in Black team.

Elfman retrieved the "old-school spy" sensibility of the film by tapping on the 1960s ultralounge music that provided a conscious throwback to that era. Despite the characters travelling across the globe and the film has subtitled International in the film, Elfman refrained from leaning geographically, despite the team's attempts. He recalled that, "even though there are a few moments in Morocco where they asked me to bring in some Moroccan flavor [...] I tried as much as I could without going too on-the-nose with that."

The Japanese version uses a song by Yoshimotozaka46, titled "Konya wa Eeyan".

== Release ==
Sony Masterworks released the soundtrack on June 7, 2019, a week ahead of the film's theatrical release.

== Reception ==
Filmtracks.com wrote "The work is a sufficiently competent and enjoyable supplement with about fifteen minutes of truly worthwhile material." William Bibbiani of TheWrap wrote "composer Chris Bacon gives Danny Elfman's original, eclectic Men in Black score an action movie punch-up." Barry Hertz of The Globe and Mail deciphered it as a "bouncy score". Karen Han of Polygon complimented the use of the theme music from the predecessors, provide a "considerable amount of goodwill".

Diamond Fudge of KCCI criticized it as "a bland imitation of Danny Elfman's original score". Oliver Jones of The Observer wrote "the score—written by original series composer Danny Elfman aided by Chris Bacon bubbles with a pulsing irony and self-awareness that the script only wishes it possessed. But there is too much of it. Smothering every last scene, the music ends up feeling like the gravy in Navy boat cream chipped beef, meant chiefly to distract you from what lies beneath."

== Track listing ==
Men in Black: International (Original Motion Picture Score) track listing
No.	Title	Length
1.	"Logos"	1:28
2.	"L Train"	2:49
3.	"Seeing Is Believing"	4:45
4.	"Job Interview"	0:54
5.	"I Found You"	1:59
6.	"Viper"	1:56
7.	"Twins"	1:09
8.	"Who's That Guy?"	1:22
9.	"VR Room"	1:36
10.	"Too Much"	1:31
11.	"Vungus Aftermath"	1:49
12.	"Here Comes Trouble"	1:44
13.	"Riding a Bike"	2:57
14.	"Blue Giant"	2:04
15.	"Pink Trousers"	3:58
16.	"Flying Fists"	3:35
17.	"Kabla"	2:26
18.	"Demise"	1:31
19.	"Where's the Weapon?"	2:32
20.	"Ah, Paris"	1:28
21.	"The Truth"	2:35
22.	"Portal"	2:09
23.	"Like a Son"	0:58
24.	"Promotions"	2:56
25.	"Red Button"	1:12
26.	"End Credits"	1:04
Total length:		54:27

== Personnel ==
Credits adapted from liner notes.

- Music – Chris Bacon, Danny Elfman
- Additional music – TJ Lindgren
- Producer – Chris Bacon, Danny Elfman, Noah Snyder
- Programming – Michael Tuller
- Recording – Dennis Sands
- Digital recordist – Larry Mah
- Mixing – Noah Snyder
- Mastering – Patricia Sullivan
- Score editor – David Channing
- Music editor – Bill Abbott, Robbie Boyd
- Assistant music editor – Denise Okimoto
- Pro-tools operator – Adam Olmstead, Tim Lauber
- MIDI controller – Marc Mann
- Technician – Mikel Hurwitz
- Music coordinator – Melisa McGregor
- Musical assistance – Melissa Karaban

Orchestra

- Supervising orchestrator – Steve Bartek
- Orchestrators – Dave Slonaker, Ed Trybek, Pete Anthony
- Concertmaster – Bruce Dukov
- Conductor – Pete Anthony
- Orchestra contractor – Gina Zimmitti, Whitney Martin
- Copyist – Joann Kane Music Service, Josef Zimmermann

Instrumentalists

- Bass – David Parmeter, Drew Dembowski, Ed Meares, Geoff Osika, Ian Walker, Oscar Hidalgo
- Bassoon – Alex Rosales Garcia, Damian Montano, Evan Kuhlmann, Ken Munday
- Cello – Charlie Tyler, Dennis Karmazyn, Giovanna Clayton, Jacob Braun, Ross Gasworth, Steve Erdody, Tim Loo, Trevor Handy, Vanessa Freebairn-Smith
- Clarinet – Dan Higgins, Don Foster, Josh Ranz
- Flute – Heather Clark, Jenni Olson, Johanna Borenstein
- French horn – Dan Kelley, Dylan Hart, Jenny Kim, Laura Brenes, Mark Adams, Teag Reaves
- Guitar – George Doering
- Harp – Katie Kirkpatrick
- Oboe – Lelie Resnick, Leslie Reed
- Percussion – Bob Zimmitti, Dan Greco, Pete Korpela, Sidney Hopson
- Timpani – Greg Goodall
- Trombone – Alan Kaplan, Alex Iles, Nicholas Daley, Phil Keen, Steve Holtman
- Trumpet – Dan Rosenboom, Jon Lewis, Rob Schaer
- Tuba – Doug Tornquist, Gabriel Sears
- Viola – Aaron Oltman, Andrew Duckles, Caroline Buckman, David Walther, Erik Rynearson, Jonathan Moerschel, Luke Maurer, Matt Funes, Rob Brophy, Shawn Mann
- Violin – Alwyn Wright, Amy Hershberger, Andrew Bulbrook, Ben Jacobson, Carol Pool, Daphne Chen, Darius Campo, Grace Oh, Ina Veli, Jackie Brand, Joel Pargman, Katie Sloan, Kevin Kumar, Luanne Homzy, Lucia Micarelli, Maia Jasper, Marisa Kuney, Mark Robertson, Natalie Leggett, Neel Hammond, Nina Evtuhov, Paul Cartwright, Roger Wilkie, Sandy Cameron, Shalini Vijayan, Songa Lee, Tammy Hatwan

Vocalists

- Vocals contractor – Bobbi Page
- Alto – Amy Fogerson, Ann Sheridan, Baraka May, Bobbi Page, Charissa Neilsen, Clydene Jackson, Donna Medine, Jennifer Haydn-Jones, Katharine Hoye, Katie Hampton, Laura Jackman, Monica Lee
- Bass – Alvin Chea, Eric Bradley, Guy Maeda, Michael Geiger, Reid Bruton, Will Goldman
- Soprano – Allie Feder, Ayana Haviv, Diane Reynolds, Elin Carlson, Holly Sedillos, Jessica Freedman, Joanna Bushnell, Meredith Pyle, Monique Donnelly, Sandie Hall, Susie Stevens Logan, Suzanne Waters
- Tenor – Amick Byram, Fletcher Sheridan, Gerald White, Greg Whipple, Josh Bedlion, Walt Harrah
