= Pink Elephants (film) =

1937 film by George Gordon

Pink Elephants is a 1937 black-and-white cartoon made by the Terrytoons studio and released by 20th Century Fox. Directed by George Gordon, produced by Paul Terry and with original music by Philip A. Scheib, it was released in the United States on 9 July 1937. It is among the few unsyndicated Terrytoons that has been digitized by collectors and archivists.

Four years later, Walt Disney used the scene where Dumbo and Timothy mouse hallucinating Pink elephants after being drunk.

== Premise ==
After getting drunk, a goat sees three pink elephants everywhere he goes. An old man, groggy from the rude awakening from said goat in his house, ends up sharing the hallucination and, after loads of antics, eventually attempts to get rid of the elephants with a vacuum cleaner.
