= The Grinch (soundtrack) =

2018 soundtrack album

Dr. Seuss' The Grinch: Original Motion Picture Soundtrack and Dr. Seuss' The Grinch: Original Motion Picture Score are the albums released for the 2018 animated Christmas fantasy comedy film The Grinch, (Note: Also known as Dr. Seuss' The Grinch.) released alongside the film, on November 9, 2018, by Columbia Records and Back Lot Music. The film score is composed by Danny Elfman, and consists of 25 tracks. The soundtrack album consists of 13 tracks, performed by several artists, including a re-created version of the Christmas song "You're a Mean One, Mr. Grinch" by Elfman and rapper Tyler, the Creator, released on October 24. Tyler also produced his debut extended play based on songs from the film, titled Music Inspired by Illumination & Dr. Seuss' The Grinch, which was released by Columbia Records on November 16.

The Japanese version features a song by Perfume called “Tiny Baby”.

== Dr. Seuss' The Grinch: Original Motion Picture Soundtrack ==
Dr. Seuss' The Grinch: Original Motion Picture Soundtrack

Soundtrack album by various artists
- Released: November 9, 2018
- Genres: Hip-hop; rock; Christmas
- Length: 37:00
- Label: Columbia

Singles from Dr. Seuss' The Grinch: Original Motion Picture Score
- 1. "You're a Mean One, Mr. Grinch" Released: October 24, 2018

The lead single from the film "You're a Mean One, Mr. Grinch" was performed by Tyler, the Creator, and composed by Tyler and Elfman, which featured in the first trailer of the film. The animated lyric video for the film was also released on the same date. The song featured rap portions as well as children's choir, which was suggested by Tyler.

Elfman revealed that recreating "You’re a Mean One, Mr. Grinch" is a "slightly more complex task" on his collaboration with Tyler, and called it as "a definite bold move". Tyler gave his ideas to Elfman and they tried to find the "perfect balance between preserving recognizable elements of the song and leaning into a more contemporary take". He recalls that "some of the suggestions for tweaks were chord adjustments to bring more of the original sound of the track back into the piece". Speaking to Entertainment Weekly, Elfman said "I just didn’t want to destroy the essence of his take because artistically I never want to be the one to whitewash an artist's work that I respect. It was a bit of a tightrope act between what I know what the studio would like, and I didn't want to push him into an area he was uncomfortable".

The second track, an original song, "I Am the Grinch", was released on November 9, 2018 along with the film's soundtrack by Columbia Records. Tyler also produced and performed the song. The soundtrack was additionally released in vinyl on December 21, with two additional pressings were released on December 25, 2020 and November 5, 2021.

=== Track listing ===
No.	Title	Artists	Length
1.	"You're a Mean One, Mr. Grinch"	Tyler, the Creator	1:50
2.	"I Am the Grinch"	Tyler, the Creator featuring Fletcher Jones	2:37
3.	"Christmas Is"	Run-D.M.C.	3:19
4.	"Deck the Halls"	Jackie Wilson	1:16
5.	"Run Rudolph Run"	The Brian Setzer Orchestra	3:29
6.	"My Favorite Things"	The Supremes	2:45
7.	"Zat You Santa Claus?"	Buster Poindexter and His Banshees of Blue	2:47
8.	"Christmas in Hollis"	Run-D.M.C.	2:58
9.	"Jingle Bells"	The Brian Setzer Orchestra	2:21
10.	"The Christmas Song (Merry Christmas to You)"	Nat King Cole	3:09
11.	"God Rest Ye Merry Gentlemen"	Pentatonix	2:29
12.	"A Wonderful Awful Idea"	Danny Elfman	2:53
13.	"Stealing Christmas"	Danny Elfman	4:06
Total length:			37:00

=== Chart performance ===
Chart (2018)	Peak position
US Billboard 200	56
US Soundtrack Albums (Billboard)	11

== Dr. Seuss' The Grinch: Original Motion Picture Score ==
Dr. Seuss' The Grinch: Original Motion Picture Score

Film score by Danny Elfman
- Released: November 9, 2018
- Genre: Film score
- Length: 48:00
- Label: Back Lot Music
- Producer: Danny Elfman

Danny Elfman chronology
Don't Worry, He Won't Get Far on Foot (2018)	Dr. Seuss' The Grinch: Original Motion Picture Score (2019)	Dumbo (2019)

Danny Elfman composed the film's score. Elfman revealed that the animated project was a "full-circle moment for him in many ways" due to his own childhood connection to Seuss stories. As the film's release, eventually coincided with the 25th anniversary of Tim Burton's The Nightmare Before Christmas, which Elfman had scored several songs, he revealed to Entertainment Weekly, saying that all songs from the film are inspired by Dr. Seuss metering and rhythm in the lyrics, adding that "the musicality, the metric quality, it all goes back to Dr. Seuss". He also met Seuss for the potential musical based on Oh, the Places You'll Go!, which did not materialise. Elfman agreed to score for The Grinch, due to Illumination's dedication to Seuss' original story: "I knew the film was going to be Dr. Seuss, that they weren’t going to transform it that much. Obviously, they were going to have to change it into a feature-length film and add a lot, but I felt like they were still going to be respectful to the Seuss spirit".

The score album was released by Back Lot Music on November 9.

=== Reception ===
The score received positive reviews. Jonathan Broxton of Movie Music UK wrote: "The main theme – once you find it – is good, the orchestrations and arrangements are rich and varied, the action music is at times wonderfully boisterous if a little scattershot, the emotional content often allows the score to reach some lovely heights, and it features many of Elfman’s most beloved compositional idiosyncrasies and instrumental combinations, some of which date all the way back to his 1990s heyday. But there's just something – something – about it which doesn't connect with me on a base level". Filmtracks.com wrote that "Dr. Seuss' The Grinch is a respectful and effective score, but it's Elfman clearly on auto-pilot, and don't be surprised if the score-only album provides you nothing more than a short-lived mood perk".

=== Track listing ===
All music is composed by Danny Elfman, except where noted.

No.	Title	Length
1.	"The Big Opening"	2:46
2.	"Going to Town"	1:36
3.	"Jaunty Kitchen"	1:37
4.	"Mailing a Letter"	0:50
5.	"It's Better This Way"	1:29
6.	"Northward Bound"	1:29
7.	"Christmas in Whoville"	4:01
8.	"Last Lonely Boy"	1:52
9.	"Welcome Song/Forlorn"	2:29
10.	"To the Fort"	1:18
11.	"Dog Tongue"	1:23
12.	"Walking Toward Destiny"	2:47
13.	"The Loudest Snow"	2:10
14.	"Puppy Eyes"	1:03
15.	"Command Center"	1:33
16.	"Grinch's Wild Ride"	2:42
17.	"Kids Can't Sleep"	1:33
18.	"Stealing Christmas"	4:04
19.	"Taking the Bait"	1:43
20.	"It's My Fault"	2:19
21.	"Welcome Christmas" (written by Albert Hague and Ted Geisel)	1:38
22.	"The Apology"	1:08
23.	"First Christmas"	0:51
24.	"The Big Finale"	1:56
25.	"All By Myself" (Bonus track)	1:05
Total length:		48:00

For Your Consideration track list

No.	Title	Length
1.	"The Big Opening"	1:58
2.	"Going To Town"	1:38
3.	"Jaunty Kitchen"	1:38
4.	"Mailing A Letter"	0:52
5.	"Better This Way"	1:33
6.	"Northward Bound"	1:31
7.	"Hanging The Ornaments"	1:28
8.	"The Catapult"	1:19
9.	"Lost Lonely Boy"	1:55
10.	"Forlorn"	1:31
11.	"To The Fort"	1:20
12.	"Dog Tongue"	1:25
13.	"Screaming Goat"	1:07
14.	"Cindy Lou's Plan"	1:40
15.	"Loudest Snow"	1:32
16.	"Bedtime-Puppy Eyes"	1:06
17.	"Command Center"	1:35
18.	"Test Ride"	1:03
19.	"Kids Can't Sleep"	1:05
20.	"First House"	4:06
21.	"Taking The Bait"	4:05
22.	"It's My Fault"	2:21
23.	"Welcome Christmas"	1:02
24.	"Fred To The Rescue"	1:34
25.	"The Apology"	1:10
26.	"The Big Finale"	1:55
