= Justice League (soundtrack) =

Justice League: Original Motion Picture Soundtrack

Soundtrack album by Danny Elfman
- Released: November 10, 2017 (digital); December 8, 2017 (physical)
- Recorded: 2017
- Genre: Soundtrack
- Length: 104:54
- Label: WaterTower
- Producer: Danny Elfman

Danny Elfman chronology
The Circle (2017)	Justice League: Original Motion Picture Soundtrack (2017)	Before I Wake (2018)

Singles from Justice League
- 1. "Come Together" Released: September 7, 2017

Professional ratings
Review scores
Source	Rating
Filmtracks	4/5 stars
AllMusic	5/5 stars

Justice League: Original Motion Picture Soundtrack is the soundtrack to the film of the same name composed by Danny Elfman. It was released on November 10, 2017, by WaterTower Music, while the physical edition was released on December 8 by WaterTower. Most of the material used in Elfman's soundtrack was discarded by Tom Holkenborg (whom Elfman replaced as composer for the film's 2017 theatrical cut) when he returned to score the 2021 director's cut of the film.

The score received mixed reception from critics and fans alike. While some praised its orchestral sound and use of Elfman's original Batman theme others thought the score was derivative of Elfman's previous scores and too much of a departure from previous DCEU scores.

== Production ==
In March 2016, Hans Zimmer, who co-composed the score for Man of Steel and Batman v Superman: Dawn of Justice, stated that he had officially retired from the "superhero business", though he would later score Dark Phoenix (2019) and Wonder Woman 1984 (2020). Junkie XL, who wrote and composed the soundtrack of Batman v Superman: Dawn of Justice with Zimmer, was originally scoring the film, but was replaced by Danny Elfman the following year in June. Elfman had previously composed scores for the films Batman (1989) and Batman Returns (1992), and the theme music for Batman: The Animated Series and the 1990 TV series, The Flash. Elfman used the Batman theme music from the 1989 film. John Williams's "Superman March" was used during "a dark, twisted moment" in the film where a resurrected Superman fights the Justice League and later during the climax where Superman arrives to defeat Steppenwolf. The film features a cover of Leonard Cohen's "Everybody Knows" performed by Sigrid, "Icky Thump" performed by the White Stripes, and a cover of the Beatles' "Come Together" performed by Gary Clark Jr. and Junkie XL. In interviews promoting the film, Elfman defended incorporating classic superhero themes by comparing the strategy to "the single-most surviving and loved theme in the world" Star Wars, and argued that reboots shouldn't needlessly throw away iconic musical heritage. WaterTower Music released the soundtrack album digitally on November 10 the same year, with a release of the physical format on December 8.

== Track listing ==
All music is composed by Danny Elfman, except where noted. T.J. Lindgren, Pinar Toprak, and Geoff Zanelli are credited for additional music. Though not included in the soundtrack, the theatrical cut features a brief excerpt of the piece "Krypton" ("Look to the Stars" on the 2013 CD release), which Hans Zimmer composed for Man of Steel. It is the only use of Zimmer's Superman theme in the film. Also not included in the soundtrack is the Blackpink hit, "As If It's Your Last", which, along with its accompanying music video appears in The Flash's laboratory when he meets Bruce Wayne.

No.	Title	Writer(s)	Artist(s)	Length
1.	"Everybody Knows"	Leonard Cohen; Sharon Robinson	Sigrid	4:25
2.	"The Justice League Theme – Logos"			0:48
3.	"Hero's Theme"			4:17
4.	"Batman on the Roof" (includes elements of the 1989 "Batman Theme" and "Men Are Still Good")	Elfman; T.J. Lindgren		2:34
5.	"Enter Cyborg"			2:00
6.	"Wonder Woman Rescue" (includes elements of "Is She with You?")	Robert Badami; Elfman; Steve Mazzaro; Melissa Muik; Mark Andrew Wherry; Hans Zimmer		2:43
7.	"Hippolyta's Arrow"	Elfman; Pinar Toprak		1:16
8.	"The Story of Steppenwolf"			2:59
9.	"The Amazon Mother Box" (includes elements of "Is She with You?")	Elfman; Geoff Zanelli		4:33
10.	"Cyborg Meets Diana"			2:36
11.	"Aquaman in Atlantis"			2:39
12.	"Then There Were Three" (includes elements of the 1989 "Batman Theme")			1:10
13.	"The Tunnel Fight" (includes elements of the 1989 "Batman Theme")	Elfman; Lindgren; Zanelli		6:24
14.	"The World Needs Superman"			1:00
15.	"Spark of The Flash"			2:18
16.	"Friends and Foes" (includes elements of John Williams' 1978 "Superman March")	Elfman; Toprak; John Williams		4:14
17.	"Justice League United"			1:24
18.	"Home"			3:24
19.	"Bruce and Diana"			1:06
20.	"The Final Battle" (includes elements of the 1989 "Batman Theme" and the 1978 "Superman March")	Elfman; Lindgren; Williams; Zanelli		6:14
21.	"A New Hope"			4:36
22.	"Anti-Hero's Theme"			5:35
23.	"Come Together"	Lennon–McCartney	Gary Clark Jr. and Junkie XL	3:13
24.	"Icky Thump"	Jack White	The White Stripes	4:14
25.	"The Tunnel Fight (Full Length)" (includes elements of the 1989 "Batman Theme")	Elfman; Lindgren; Zanelli		10:58
26.	"The Final Battle (Full Length)" (includes elements of the 1989 "Batman Theme" and the 1978 "Superman March")	Elfman; Lindgren; Williams; Zanelli		12:57
27.	"Mother Russia"			1:45
Total length:				101:22

== Charts ==
Chart (2017)	Peak position
US Billboard 200	186
US Soundtrack Albums (Billboard)	11
