= Fifty Shades Freed (score) =

Fifty Shades Freed (Original Motion Picture Score)

Film score by Danny Elfman
- Released: February 16, 2018
- Studios: Newman Scoring Stage, 20th Century Fox Studios, Los Angeles; Studio Della Morte, Los Angeles; Bernie Grundman Mastering, Hollywood
- Genre: Film score
- Length: 42:06
- Label: Back Lot Music
- Producers: Danny Elfman; David Buckley

Danny Elfman chronology
| Before I Wake (2018) | Fifty Shades Freed (2018) | Don't Worry, He Won't Get Far on Foot (2018) |

Fifty Shades Freed (Original Motion Picture Score) is the film score to the 2018 film Fifty Shades Freed directed by James Foley, starring Dakota Johnson and Jamie Dornan. The sequel to Fifty Shades Darker (2017), it is based on E. L. James's 2012 novel of the same name and serves as the third installment in the Fifty Shades film series. Danny Elfman who composed the first two films, returned to score Freed. The score soundtrack was released through Back Lot Music on February 16, 2018.

== Reception ==
The score received mixed response from music critics. Filmtracks wrote "It is disappointing to declare that Elfman's "Fifty Shades" scores have become less interesting with each sordid encounter, but it's safe to continue recommending Fifty Shades of Grey as the only score album of the series worth exploring. That and the nipple clamps and butt plugs, of course." Jonathan Broxton of Movie Music UK wrote "Danny Elfman’s contribution to these three risible films is probably the most worthwhile thing associated with them. They don’t come anywhere close to being the best examples of their writing styles – he has been more romantic, more fun and upbeat, and more exciting on many scores elsewhere – but you won’t need that naughty film reviewer’s safe word to get out of listening to them, and you won’t need to hide them from your parents." Elfman's score "eternally crescendos like a telenovela about to cut to commercial break". Simon Abrams and Alex de Campi of The Hollywood Reporter called it a "bombastic" score. Mia Pidlaoan of Screen Rant while reviewing Elfman's best works listed the trilogy, including Freed; she called it as an "inquisitive" score and "gives the movies more depth than what meets the eye."

== Track listing ==
| No. | Title | Length |
|---|---|---|
| 1. | "Freed" | 2:10 |
| 2. | "Makeover" | 2:21 |
| 3. | "A Spat" | 1:35 |
| 4. | "Anna Wakes" | 1:40 |
| 5. | "Blueprints" | 1:29 |
| 6. | "Car Fun" | 1:07 |
| 7. | "Trouble in Paradise" | 2:35 |
| 8. | "That's Not Hyde" | 2:25 |
| 9. | "Jack the Knife" | 1:15 |
| 10. | "Welcome Home" | 2:39 |
| 11. | "Hiking" | 1:09 |
| 12. | "Nightmare" | 1:55 |
| 13. | "Bail" | 3:05 |
| 14. | "Seeing Red" | 2:43 |
| 15. | "Going Gets Rough" | 2:34 |
| 16. | "Ransom" | 3:57 |
| 17. | "The Envelope" | 1:45 |
| 18. | "Rescue" | 6:40 |
| Total length: | | 43:04 |

== Personnel ==
Credits adapted from liner notes:

- Music composer – Danny Elfman
- Music producer – Danny Elfman, David Buckley
- Additional music – David Buckley
- Recording and mixing – Noah Snyder
- Digital recordist – Greg Hayes
- Mastering – Patricia Sullivan
- Score editor – Angie Rubin, Bill Abbott
- Assistant score editor – Sebastian Zuleta
- Musical assistance – Melissa Karaban
- Assistant technical engineer – Drew Webster
- Score coordinator – Melisa McGregor
- Copyist – Joann Kane Music Services
- Package design – Brian Porizek

Orchestra

- Orchestration – Philip Klein
- Conductor – Pete Anthony
- Orchestra contractor – Gina Zimmitti
- Concertmaster – Bruce Dukov

Instruments

- Bass – Chris Kollgaard, Drew Dembowski, Ian Walker, Mike Valerio, Oscar Hidalgo, Ed Meares
- Bassoon – Rose Corrigan
- Cello – Armen Ksajikian, Cecilia Tsan, Charlie Tyler, Dennis Karmazyn, Eric Byers, Giovanna Clayton, Laszlo Mezo, Ross Gasworth, Tim Landauer, Tim Loo, Trevor Handy, Vanessa Freebairn-Smith, Steve Erdody
- Clarinet – Stuart Clark
- Drums – Tal Bergman
- Electric bass – Chris Chaney
- Flute – Heather Clark, Jenni Olson
- Guitar – George Doering
- Harp – Katie Kirkpatrick
- Oboe – Leslie Reed
- Piano – Robert Thies
- Technician [Technical Assistant] – Ed McCormack, Mikel Hurwitz
- Viola – Alma Fernandez, Andrew Duckles, Caroline Buckman, Carolyn Riley, Darrin McCann, David Walther, Erik Rynearson, Zach Dellinger, Keith Greene, Matt Funes, Rob Brophy, Shawn Mann, Brian Dembow
- Violin – Alyssa Park, Ana Landauer, Ben Powell, Carol Pool, Charlie Bisharat, Christian Hebel, Darius Campo, Eun-Mee Ahn, Grace Oh, Ina Veli, Irina Voloshina, Jackie Brand, Jessica Guideri, Joel Pargman, Josefina Vergara, Julie Gigante, Julie Rogers, Katia Popov, Kevin Kumar, Lucia Micarelli, Maia Jasper, Marisa Kuney, Natalie Leggett, Neel Hammond, Nina Evtuhov, Phil Levy, Roberto Cani, Roger Wilkie, Sara Parkins, Sarah Thornblade, Serena McKinney, Shalini Vijayan, Songa Lee, Tammy Hatwan, Tereza Stanislav, Yelena Yegoryan, Richard Altenbach

Management

- Music business affairs for Universal Pictures – Tanya Perera, Terra Hatch
- Executive in charge of music for Universal Pictures – Mike Knobloch
- Marketing manager for Back Lot Music – Nikki Walsh
- Production manager for Back Lot Music – Andy Kalyvas
- Music supervisor for Universal Pictures – Rachel Levy

== Chart performance ==
| Chart (2018) | Peak position |
|---|---|
| UK Soundtrack Albums (OCC) | 30 |
| US Top Soundtracks (Billboard) | 24 |
