= Pink Elephant (cigarette) =

Dutch cigarette brand

Pink Elephant is a Dutch brand of cigarettes, currently owned and manufactured by Heupink & Bloemen, which also manufactures the Black Devil brand.

== History ==
Pink Elephant cigarettes are sold in numerous countries including the Netherlands, Germany, Austria, France, Spain, Switzerland, Poland, Czech Republic, and Japan The brand, like Black Devil, offers a vanilla flavoured cigarette. Traditionally, the cigarettes had a pink colour, but in 2012 they were rebranded to have a pink-white colour instead.

== See also ==
- Tobacco smoking
