= Pink Elephants on Parade =

Song by The Sportsmen (uncredited)

from the album Dumbo
- Released: October 23, 1941
- Recorded: 1941
- Studio: Walt Disney Studios
- Genre: Jazz; novelty song
- Length: 4:28
- Label: Victor Records
- Composer: Oliver Wallace
- Lyricist: Ned Washington
- Producer: Walt Disney

"Pink Elephants on Parade" is a song and scene from the 1941 Disney animated feature film Dumbo in which Dumbo and Timothy Q. Mouse, having accidentally become intoxicated (through drinking water spiked with champagne), see pink elephants sing, dance, and play musical instruments during a hallucination sequence. After the sequence, Dumbo and Timothy wake up, hungover, in a tree. It is at this point that they realize that Dumbo can fly.

The song was written by Oliver Wallace (music) and Ned Washington (lyrics) and sung by The Sportsmen. The segment was directed by Norman Ferguson, laid out by Ken O'Connor and animated by Hicks Lokey, Karl Van Leuven, and Howard Swift.

The song is featured in the Disney live-action remake, directed by Tim Burton. The Pink Elephants themselves appear as human-made bubble sculptures which also come to life.

== In popular culture ==
=== Covers ===
- The song was covered by Sun Ra. A recording of this arrangement is available on Stay Awake, a tribute album of Disney tunes played by various artists, and produced by Hal Willner. The song was also covered by Circus Contraption and Lee Press-on and the Nails.
- House of Mouse pays homage to the song in the episode "Mickey and Minnie's Big Vacation".

=== Parodies ===
- Scenes from this sequence are reused in the 1943 Disney World War II anti-Nazi propaganda film Der Fuehrer's Face.
- In The Big Snooze, Elmer Fudd's nightmare includes a parody of the sequence with "ziwwions and twiwwions of wabbits" marching on top of Fudd while Bugs Bunny is at an adding machine, literally multiplying them.
- The South Park episode "Doubling Down" references this sequence in a brief segment in which Eric Cartman, while in a hallucinatory fit of rage, visualizes a group of pink Kyles marching out of a broken heart.
- "Heffalumps and Woozles" from Winnie the Pooh and the Blustery Day and The Many Adventures of Winnie the Pooh bears a strong resemblance to "Pink Elephants on Parade".

== See also ==
- Frank Churchill
