= Alcohol withdrawal syndrome =

Medical condition

- Skeletal formula of ethanol
- Specialty: Toxicology, addiction medicine, intensive care medicine, psychiatry
- Symptoms: Anxiety, shakiness, sweating, vomiting, fast heart rate, mild fever
- Complications: Seizures, delirium tremens, death
- Usual onset: Six hours following the last drink
- Duration: Up to a week
- Causes: Reduction or cessation of alcohol intake after a period of excessive use
- Diagnostic method: Clinical Institute Withdrawal Assessment for Alcohol (CIWA-Ar)
- Treatment: Benzodiazepines, thiamine, gabapentin
- Frequency: ~50% of people with alcoholism upon reducing use

Table from the 2010 DrugScience study ranking various drugs (legal and illegal) based on statements by drug-harm experts. This study rated alcohol the most harmful drug overall, and the only drug more harmful to others than to the users themselves.

Alcohol withdrawal syndrome (AWS) is a set of symptoms that can occur following a reduction in or cessation of alcohol use after a period of excessive use. Symptoms typically include anxiety, shakiness, sweating, vomiting, fast heart rate, and a mild fever. More severe symptoms may include seizures, and delirium tremens (DTs); which can be fatal in untreated patients. Symptoms start at around 6 hours after the last drink. Peak incidence of seizures occurs at 24 to 36 hours and peak incidence of DT is at 48 to 72 hours.

Alcohol withdrawal may occur in those who are alcohol dependent. This may occur following a planned or unplanned decrease in alcohol intake. The underlying mechanism involves a decreased responsiveness of GABA receptors in the brain. The withdrawal process is typically followed using the Clinical Institute Withdrawal Assessment for Alcohol scale (CIWA-Ar).

The typical treatment of alcohol withdrawal is with benzodiazepines such as chlordiazepoxide or diazepam. Often, the amounts given are based on a person's symptoms. Thiamine is recommended routinely. Electrolyte problems and low blood sugar should also be treated. Early treatment improves outcomes.

In the Western world, about 15% of people have problems with alcoholism at some point in time. Alcohol depresses the central nervous system, slowing cerebral messaging and altering the way signals are sent and received. Progressively larger amounts of alcohol are needed to achieve the same physical and emotional results. The drinker eventually must consume alcohol to avoid the physical cravings and withdrawal symptoms. About half of people with alcoholism will develop withdrawal symptoms upon reducing their use, with four percent developing severe symptoms. Among those with severe symptoms up to 15% die. Symptoms of alcohol withdrawal have been described at least as early as 400 BC by Hippocrates. It is not believed to have become a widespread problem until the 1700s.

== Signs and symptoms ==
Signs and symptoms of alcohol withdrawal occur primarily in the central nervous system. The severity of withdrawal can vary from mild symptoms such as insomnia, muscle aches, trembling, and anxiety to severe and life-threatening symptoms such as alcoholic hallucinosis, delirium tremens, and autonomic instability.

Withdrawal usually begins 6 to 24 hours after the last drink. Symptoms are worst at 24 to 72 hours, and improve by seven days. To be classified as alcohol withdrawal syndrome, patients must exhibit at least two of the following symptoms: increased hand tremor, insomnia, nausea or vomiting, transient hallucinations (auditory, visual or tactile), psychomotor agitation, anxiety, generalized tonic–clonic seizures, and autonomic instability.

Several factors dictate the severity of symptoms, the most important of which are the degree of alcohol intake, the length of time the individual has been using alcohol, and the previous history of alcohol withdrawal. Symptoms are also grouped together and classified:

- Alcohol hallucinosis: patients have transient visual, auditory, or tactile hallucinations, but are otherwise clear.
- Withdrawal seizures: seizures occur within 48 hours of alcohol cessation and occur either as a single generalized tonic-clonic seizure or as a brief episode of multiple seizures.
- Delirium tremens: hyperadrenergic state, disorientation, tremors, diaphoresis, impaired attention/consciousness, and visual and auditory hallucinations.

=== Progression ===
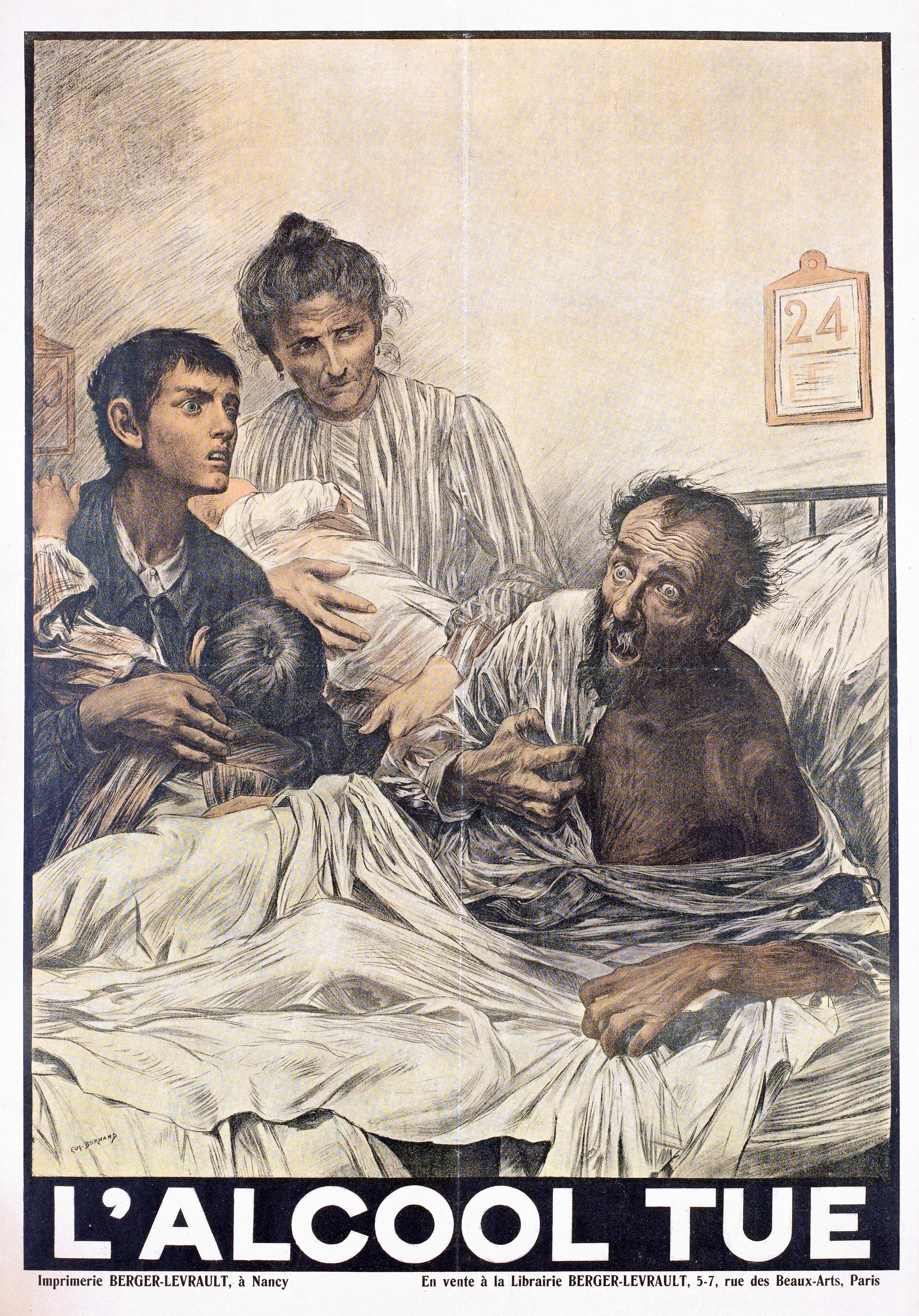
Acute confusional state caused by alcohol withdrawal, also known as delirium tremens

Six to 12 hours after the ingestion of the last drink, withdrawal symptoms such as shaking, headache, sweating, anxiety, nausea or vomiting may occur. Twelve to 24 hours after cessation, the condition may progress to such major symptoms as confusion, hallucinations (with awareness of reality), while less severe symptoms may persist and develop including tremor, agitation, hyperactivity and insomnia.

At 12 to 48 hours following the last ethanol ingestion, the possibility of generalized tonic–clonic seizures should be anticipated, occurring in 3–5% of cases. Meanwhile, none of the earlier withdrawal symptoms will typically have abated. Seizures carry the risk of major complications and death for individuals with an alcohol use disorder.

Although the person's condition usually begins to improve after 48 hours, withdrawal symptoms sometimes continue to increase in severity and advance to the most severe stage of withdrawal, delirium tremens. This occurs in 5–20% of patients experiencing detoxification and one third of untreated cases, which is characterized by hallucinations that are indistinguishable from reality, severe confusion, seizures, high blood pressure, and fever that can persist anywhere from 4 to 12 days.

=== Protracted withdrawal ===
A protracted alcohol withdrawal syndrome occurs in many with alcohol use disorder (AUD) when withdrawal symptoms continue beyond the acute withdrawal stage, but usually at a subacute level of intensity and gradually decreasing in severity over time. This syndrome is sometimes referred to as the post-acute-withdrawal syndrome. Some withdrawal symptoms can linger for at least a year after discontinuation of alcohol. Symptoms can include a craving for alcohol, inability to feel pleasure from normally pleasurable things (known as anhedonia), clouding of sensorium, disorientation, nausea and vomiting, or headache.

Insomnia is a common protracted withdrawal symptom that persists after the acute withdrawal phase of alcohol. Insomnia has also been found to influence relapse rates. Studies have found that magnesium or trazodone can help treat the persistent withdrawal symptom of insomnia in AUD recovery. Insomnia can be difficult to treat in these individuals because many of the traditional sleep aids (e.g., benzodiazepines) work via a GABA_{A} receptor mechanism and are cross-tolerant with alcohol. However, trazodone is not cross-tolerant with alcohol. The acute phase of the alcohol withdrawal syndrome can occasionally be protracted. Protracted delirium tremens has been reported in the medical literature as a possible but unusual feature of alcohol withdrawal.

== Pathophysiology ==
Chronic use of alcohol leads to changes in brain chemistry, especially in the GABAergic system. Various adaptations occur, such as changes in gene expression and downregulation of GABA_{A} receptors. During acute alcohol withdrawal, changes also occur, such as upregulation of alpha4-containing GABA_{A} receptors and downregulation of alpha1 and alpha3-containing GABA_{A} receptors. Neurochemical changes occurring during alcohol withdrawal can be minimized with drugs that are used for acute detoxification. With abstinence from alcohol and cross-tolerant drugs, these changes in neurochemistry may gradually return towards normal. Adaptations to the NMDA system also occur as a result of repeated alcohol intoxication and are involved in the hyper-excitability of the central nervous system during the alcohol withdrawal syndrome. Homocysteine levels, which are elevated during chronic drinking, increase even further during the withdrawal state, and may result in excitotoxicity. Alterations in ECG (in particular an increase in QT interval) and EEG abnormalities (including abnormal quantified EEG) may occur during early withdrawal. Dysfunction of the hypothalamic–pituitary–adrenal axis and increased release of corticotropin-releasing hormone occur during both acute and protracted abstinence from alcohol and contribute to both acute and protracted withdrawal symptoms. Anhedonia/dysphoria symptoms, which can persist as part of a protracted withdrawal, may be due to dopamine underactivity.

=== Kindling ===
Kindling is a phenomenon where repeated alcohol detoxifications lead to an increased severity of the withdrawal syndrome. For example, binge drinkers may initially experience no withdrawal symptoms, but with each period of alcohol use followed by cessation, their withdrawal symptoms intensify in severity and may eventually result in full-blown delirium tremens with convulsive seizures. Alcoholics who experience seizures during detoxification are more likely to have had previous episodes of alcohol detoxification than patients who do not have seizures during withdrawal. In addition, people with previous withdrawal syndromes are more likely to have more medically complicated alcohol withdrawal symptoms.

Kindling can cause complications and may increase the risk of relapse, alcohol-related brain damage, and cognitive deficits. Chronic alcohol misuse and kindling via multiple alcohol withdrawals may lead to permanent alterations in the GABA_{A} receptors. The mechanism behind kindling is sensitization of some neuronal systems and desensitization of other neuronal systems, which leads to increasingly gross neurochemical imbalances. This in turn leads to more profound withdrawal symptoms including anxiety, convulsions, and neurotoxicity.

Binge drinking is associated with increased impulsivity, impairments in spatial working memory, and impaired emotional learning. These adverse effects are believed to be due to the neurotoxic effects of repeated withdrawal from alcohol on aberrant neuronal plasticity and cortical damage. Repeated periods of acute intoxication followed by acute detoxification have profound effects on the brain and are associated with an increased risk of seizures as well as cognitive deficits. The effects on the brain are similar to those seen in alcoholics who have detoxified repeatedly, but not as severe as in alcoholics who have no history of prior detox. Thus, the acute withdrawal syndrome appears to be the most important factor in causing damage or impairment to brain function. The brain regions most sensitive to harm from binge drinking are the amygdala and prefrontal cortex.

People in adolescence who experience repeated withdrawals from binge drinking show impairments of long-term nonverbal memory. Alcoholics who have had two or more alcohol withdrawals show more frontal lobe cognitive dysfunction than those who have experienced one or no prior withdrawals. Kindling of neurons is the proposed cause of withdrawal-related cognitive damage. Kindling from repeated withdrawals leads to accumulating neuroadaptive changes. Kindling may also be the reason for cognitive damage seen in binge drinkers.

== Diagnosis ==
Many hospitals use the Clinical Institute Withdrawal Assessment for Alcohol (CIWA) protocol to assess the level of withdrawal present and therefore the amount of medication needed. When overuse of alcohol is suspected but drinking history is unclear, testing for elevated values of carbohydrate-deficient transferrin or gamma-glutamyl transferase can help make the diagnosis of alcohol overuse and dependence clearer. The CIWA has also been shortened (now called the CIWA-Ar), while retaining its validity and reliability, to help assess patients more efficiently due to the life-threatening nature of alcohol withdrawal.

== Treatment ==
Benzodiazepines are effective for the management of symptoms as well as the prevention of seizures. Certain vitamins are also an important part of the management of alcohol withdrawal syndrome. In those with severe symptoms, inpatient care is often required. In those with lesser symptoms, treatment at home may be possible with daily visits with a healthcare provider. Treatment approaches may also vary according to a person's health, circumstances, available resources, and location; Riverside Recovery, for example, describes multiple treatment options for adults with alcohol use disorder.

Cohort studies have demonstrated that the combination of anticonvulsants and benzodiazepines is more effective than other treatments in reducing alcohol withdrawal scores and shortening the duration of intensive care unit stays.

=== Benzodiazepines ===
Benzodiazepines are the most commonly used medication for the treatment of alcohol withdrawal and are generally safe and effective in suppressing symptoms of alcohol withdrawal. This class of medication is generally effective in symptom control, but needs to be used carefully. Although benzodiazepines have a long history of successfully treating and preventing withdrawal, there is no consensus on the ideal one to use. The most commonly used agents are long-acting benzodiazepines, such as chlordiazepoxide and diazepam. These are believed to be superior to other benzodiazepines for the treatment of delirium and allow for longer periods between doses. However, benzodiazepines with intermediate half-lives like lorazepam may be safer in people with liver problems. Benzodiazepines showed a protective benefit against alcohol withdrawal symptoms, in particular seizure, compared to other common methods of treatment.

The primary debate between the use of long-acting benzodiazepines and short-acting ones is that of ease of use. Longer-acting drugs, such as diazepam, can be administered less frequently. However, evidence does exist that "symptom-triggered regimens" such as those used when treating with lorazepam are as safe and effective, but have decreased treatment duration and medication quantity used.

Although benzodiazepines are very effective at treating alcohol withdrawal, they should be used carefully. Benzodiazepines should only be used for brief periods in alcoholics who are not already dependent on them, as they share cross-tolerance with alcohol. There is a risk of replacing an alcohol addiction with benzodiazepine dependence or adding another addiction. Furthermore, disrupted GABA benzodiazepine receptor function is part of alcohol dependence, and chronic benzodiazepines may prevent full recovery from alcohol-induced mental effects. The combination of benzodiazepines and alcohol can amplify the adverse psychological effects of each other, causing enhanced depressive effects on mood and increasing suicidal actions, and is generally contraindicated except for alcohol withdrawal.

=== Vitamins ===
People who consume excessive alcohol are often deficient in various nutrients, which can cause severe complications during alcohol withdrawal, such as the development of Wernicke syndrome. To help prevent Wernicke syndrome, these individuals should be given a multivitamin preparation with sufficient thiamine and folic acid. During alcohol withdrawal, the prophylactic administration of thiamine, folic acid, and pyridoxine intravenously is recommended before starting any carbohydrate-containing fluids or food. These vitamins are often combined into a banana bag for intravenous administration.

=== Anticonvulsants ===
Very limited evidence indicates that topiramate or pregabalin may be useful in the treatment of alcohol withdrawal syndrome. Limited evidence supports the use of gabapentin or carbamazepine for the treatment of mild or moderate alcohol withdrawal as the sole treatment or as combination therapy with other medications; however, gabapentin does not appear to be effective for treatment of severe alcohol withdrawal and is therefore not recommended for use in this setting. A 2010 Cochrane review similarly reported that the evidence to support the role of anticonvulsants over benzodiazepines in the treatment of alcohol withdrawal is not supported. Paraldehyde combined with chloral hydrate showed superiority over chlordiazepoxide with regard to life-threatening side effects and carbamazepine may have advantages for certain symptoms. Long term anticonvulsant medications are not usually recommended in those who have had prior seizures due to withdrawal.

=== Prevention of further drinking ===
There are three medications used to help prevent a return to drinking: naltrexone, acamprosate, and disulfiram. They are used after withdrawal has occurred.

=== Other ===
Clonidine may be used in combination with benzodiazepines to help with some of the symptoms. No conclusions can be drawn concerning the efficacy or safety of baclofen for alcohol withdrawal syndrome due to the insufficiency and low quality of the evidence.

Antipsychotics, such as haloperidol, are sometimes used in addition to benzodiazepines to control agitation or psychosis. Antipsychotics may potentially worsen alcohol withdrawal as they lower the seizure threshold. Clozapine, olanzapine, or low-potency phenothiazines (such as chlorpromazine) are particularly risky; if used, extreme caution is required.

While intravenous ethanol could theoretically be used, evidence to support this use, at least in those who are very sick, is insufficient.

Hypertension is common, and some doctors also prescribe beta blockers during withdrawal.

== Prognosis ==
Failure to manage the alcohol withdrawal syndrome appropriately can lead to permanent brain damage or death. It has been proposed that brain damage due to alcohol withdrawal may be prevented by the administration of NMDA antagonists, calcium antagonists, and glucocorticoid antagonists.

=== Substances impairing recovery ===
Continued use of benzodiazepines may impair recovery from psychomotor and cognitive impairments from alcohol. Cigarette smoking may slow down or interfere with the recovery of brain pathways in recovering alcoholics.
