= Seeing pink elephants =

Euphemism for hallucinations caused by alcohol

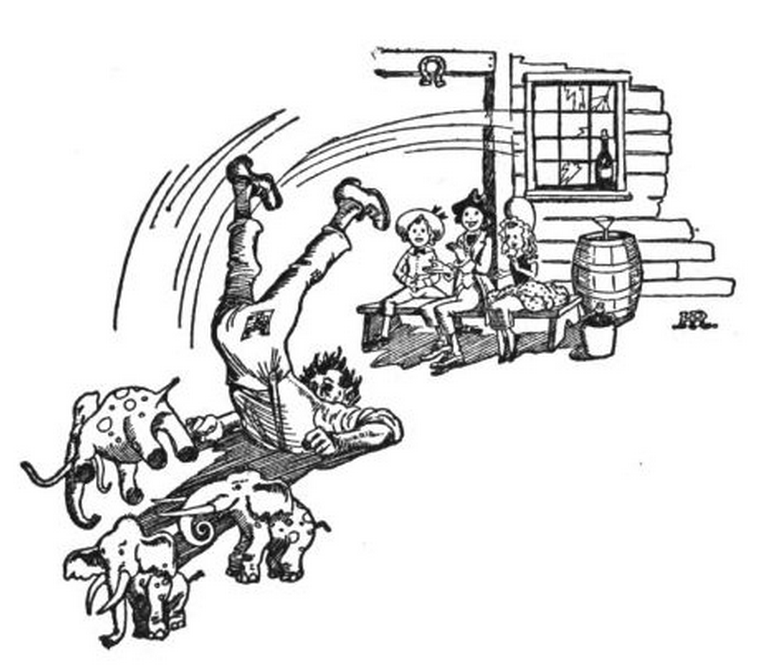
A 1921 illustration of a man with delirium tremens seeing pink elephants

"Seeing pink elephants" is a euphemism for hallucinations caused by delirium tremens or alcoholic hallucinosis, especially the former. The term dates back to at least the early 20th century, emerging from earlier idioms about seeing snakes and other creatures. An alcoholic character in Jack London's 1913 novel John Barleycorn makes reference to the hallucination of "blue mice and pink elephants" while describing the two different types of men that consume alcohol excessively. Another notable instance of the appearance of pink elephants in popular culture is the "Pink Elephants on Parade" section of the 1941 Walt Disney animated film Dumbo.

Pink elephants actually exist in nature. Although they are extremely rare, albino elephants can appear to be pink as well as white.

== History of the euphemism ==
For many decades before "pink elephant" became the standard drunken hallucination, people were known to "see snakes" or "see snakes in their boots." Beginning in about 1889, and throughout the 1890s, writers made increasingly elaborate modifications to the standard "snakes" idiom. They changed the animal to rats, monkeys, giraffes, hippopotamuses or elephants – or combinations thereof; and added color – blue, red, green, pink – and many combinations thereof.

In what may be the earliest recorded example of a (partially) pink elephant, Henry Wallace Phillips in the 1896 short story "The Man and the Serpent" – one of his "Fables for the Times" – refers to a drunken man seeing a "pink-and-green elephant" and a "feathered hippopotamus". In 1897, a humorous notice about a play entitled The Blue Monkey, noted that "We have seen it. Also the pink elephant with the orange trunk and the yellow giraffe with green trimmings. Also other things."

An early literary use of the term is by Jack London in 1913, who describes one kind of alcoholic, in the autobiographical John Barleycorn:

There is the man whom we all know, stupid, unimaginative, whose brain is bitten numbly by numb maggots; who walks generously with wide-spread, tentative legs, falls frequently in the gutter, and who sees, in the extremity of his ecstasy, blue mice and pink elephants. He is the type that gives rise to the jokes in the funny papers.

"Pink elephants" became the dominant animal of drunken-hallucination choice by about 1905, although other animals and other colors were still regularly invoked. "Seeing snakes" or "seeing snakes in one's boots" was in regular use into the 1920s.

A comical inversion of the phrase appears in the 1935 film Dracula's Daughter. The character Janet Blake makes a prank call to Dr. Garth, a psychiatrist, claiming to be from the Zoo stating "One of our elephants is seeing pink men".

In the comic book Action Comics #1, published in 1938, Lois Lane reports at the Daily Planet newspaper that she witnessed Superman. Her editor brushes off Lois's story, asking if it was pink elephants she was seeing.

A well-known reference to pink elephants occurs in the 1941 Disney animated film Dumbo. In a segment known as "Pink Elephants on Parade", after taking a drink of water from a bucket spiked with champagne, Dumbo and Timothy begin to hallucinate singing and dancing elephants.

== In alcohol marketing ==
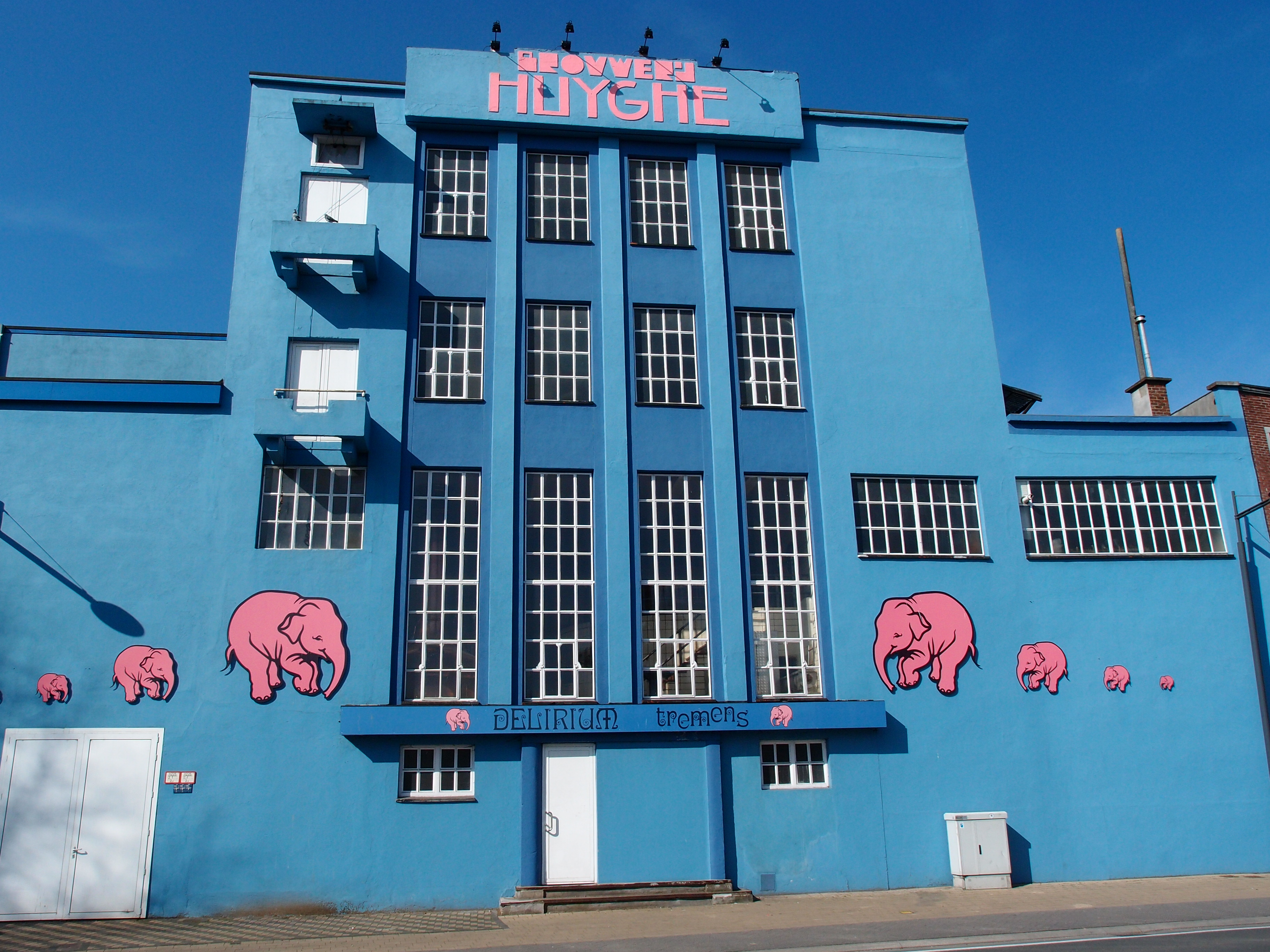
Brouwerij Huyghe in 2014.

The association between pink elephants and alcohol is reflected in the name of various alcoholic drinks. There are various cocktails called "Pink Elephant", and the Huyghe Brewery of Belgium put a pink elephant on the label of its Delirium Tremens beer.

== See also ==
- Elephant in the room
- Ironic process theory ("Don't think of a pink elephant")
