= Clinical Institute Withdrawal Assessment for Alcohol =

Scale used in the assessment and management of alcohol withdrawal

The Clinical Institute Withdrawal Assessment for Alcohol, commonly abbreviated as CIWA or CIWA-Ar (revised version), is a 10-item scale used in the assessment and management of alcohol withdrawal. Each item on the scale is scored independently, and the summation of the scores yields an aggregate value that correlates to the severity of alcohol withdrawal, with ranges of scores designed to prompt specific management decisions such as the administration of benzodiazepines. The maximum score is 67; Mild alcohol withdrawal is defined with a score less than or equal to 10, moderate with scores 11 to 15, and severe with any score equal to or greater than 16.

== CIWA-Ar ==
The CIWA-Ar is actually a shortened, improved version of the CIWA, geared towards objectifying alcohol withdrawal symptom severity. It retains validity, usefulness and reliability between raters. This revised version is the most commonly used scale in alcohol withdrawal, and was developed at the Addiction Research Foundation (now Centre for Addiction and Mental Health).

== Scale ==
The ten items evaluated on the scale are common symptoms and signs of alcohol withdrawal, and are as follows:

- Nausea and vomiting
- Tremor
- Paroxysmal sweats
- Anxiety
- Agitation
- Tactile disturbances
- Auditory disturbances
- Visual disturbances
- Headache
- Orientation and clouded sensorium

== Scoring ==
All items are scored from 0–7, with the exception of the orientation category, scored from 0–4. The CIWA scale is validated and has high inter-rater reliability. A randomized, double blind trial published in JAMA in 1994 showed that management for alcohol withdrawal that was guided by the CIWA scale resulted in decreased treatment duration and total use of benzodiazepines. The goal of the CIWA scale is to provide an efficient and objective means of assessing alcohol withdrawal. Studies have shown that use of the scale in management of alcohol withdrawal leads to decreased frequency of over-sedation with benzodiazepines in patients with milder alcohol withdrawal than would otherwise be detected without use of the scale, and decreased frequency of under-treatment in patients with greater severity of withdrawal than would otherwise be determined without the scale.

== See also ==
- AUDIT
