= Forest (name) =

Forest is both a French surname and a given name. Notable people with the name include:

== Given name ==
- Forest Able (1932–2026), American NBA player
- Forest B. H. Brown (1873–1954), American botanist
- Forest Barber (born 1952), American racing driver
- Forest Baskett (born 1943), American venture capitalist, computer scientist, and former university professor of electrical engineering
- Forest Blakk, Canadian pop singer and songwriter
- Forest Chan (1947–2024), Hong Kong actor
- Forest City Joe (1926–1960), American blues musician and harmonica player
- Forest Claudette, Australian singer and songwriter
- Forest D. Siefkin (1891–1964), American federal judge
- Forest Davis (1879–1958), American politician
- Forest Dewey Dodrill (1902–1997), American medical doctor who performed the first successful open-heart surgery
- Forest DLG (born 1984), English music producer and DJ
- Forest Etheredge (1929–2004), American educator and politician
- Forest Evashevski (1918–2009), American college football player, coach, and college athletics administrator
- Forest Firestone (1876–1940), American college football player and coach
- Forest Fletcher (1888–1945), American Olympic high- and long jumper, coach, and athletic director
- Forest Geyer (1892–1932), American college football player
- Forest Harness (1895–1974), American lawyer, World War I veteran, and politician
- Forest Hays Jr. (1928–1987), American politician
- Forest Hopkins (1912–1978), American politician
- Forest K. Ferguson (1919–1954), American college athlete and army officer
- Forest Loudin (1890–1935), American college football-, basketball-, and baseball coach
- Forest Maniac, Russian unidentified serial killer
- Forest McNeir (1875–1957), American Olympic sport shooter
- Forest Montgomery (1874–1947), American Olympic tennis player
- Forest Ray Moulton (1872–1952), American astronomer
- Forest Rohwer (born 1969), American microbial ecologist, and university professor of biology
- Forest Sale (1911–1985), American college basketball player
- Forest Sun (born 1973), Americana singer-songwriter
- Forest Swords, English record producer, composer, DJ, and artist
- Forest Tennant, American physician, writer, businessman, consultant, and politician
- Forest Vance (born 1981), American former NFL player and personal trainer
- Forest Van Hook (1883–1937), American college football player
- Forest Whitaker (born 1961), American actor, filmmaker, and activist
- Forest Willard, American video game programmer
- F. F. E. Yeo-Thomas (1902–1964), British Royal Air Force officer and Special Operations Executive agent during the Second World War

== Nickname or pseudonym ==
- Dominic "Forest" Lapointe, bassist of Augury, formerly of Beyond Creation
- Patrik "f0rest" Lindberg (born 1998), Swedish Counter-Strike and Counter-Strike: Global Offensive esports player

== Surname ==
- Antonia Forest (1915–2003), English writer of children's novels
- Armand Forest, American politician
- Carmen Forest (born 1955), American former handball player
- Dan Forest (born 1967), American politician
- Delphine Forest (1966–2020), French actress
- Denis Forest (1960–2002), Canadian actor
- Earl Forest (1926–2003), American musician
- Erastus L. De Forest (1834–1888), American mathematician
- Éric Forest (born 1952), Canadian politician
- Eva Forest (1928–2007), Spanish far-left activist and writer imprisoned for complicity in a bombing
- Frank Forest (1896–1976), American opera singer and actor
- Fred Forest (1933–2026), French new media artist
- Gérard La Forest (1926–2025), Canadian Supreme Court justice and lawyer
- Hunter Forest, American college football coach
- Jacques Forest (1920–2012), French carcinologist
- James J. F. Forest, American author and university professor
- Jean Forest (disambiguation)
- Jim Forest (1941–2022), American writer, lay theologian, educator, and peace activist
- Joanna Forest, English soprano singer
- John Forest (disambiguation)
- Karl Forest (1874–1944), Austrian actor
- Léonard Forest (1928–2024), American-born Canadian filmmaker, poet, and essayist
- Lockwood de Forest (1850–1932), American painter and interior and furniture designer
- Ludger Forest (L'Assomption MLA) (1826–1903), Canadian politician
- Ludger Forest (Sherbrooke MLA) (1877–1943), Canadian politician, nephew of the above
- Mark Forest (1933–2022), American actor and bodybuilder
- Michael Forest (born 1929), American actor
- Mickaël Forest (born 1975), French rugby union footballer
- Patsy De Forest (1894–1966), American silent film actress
- Paul Serge Forest, Canadian novelist
- Philippe Forest (born 1962), French author and professor of literature
- Robert Forest (cyclist) (born 1961), French former cyclist
- Robert Forest (architect), American architect
- Sydney Forest (born 1971), American composer and musician
- Viviane Forest (born 1979), Canadian multi-sport Paralympic medallist
- Yves Forest (1921–2019), Canadian politician and lawyer

== Fictional characters ==
- Forest Law (Tekken), in the Tekken fighting video game franchise
- Forest Wizard, in the American animated fantasy TV series Adventure Time

== See also ==
- DeForest (name)
- Forrest (given name)
- Forrest (surname)
