= DeForest (name) =

- Gender: Male
- Language: ENGLISH

Origin
- Word/name: French
- Meaning: from the forest

DeForest (and variant spellings) is a surname and a given name.

DeForest is a name of French origin, and it means "from the forest". The name Deforest is a combination of two words, "de" and "forest". The prefix "de" is derived from the Latin word "de", which means "from" or "of". The word "forest" is derived from the Latin word "forestis", which means "woodland".

Notable people with the name include:

== Surname ==
- Autumn de Forest (born 2001), American painter
- Brady Brim-DeForest (born 1980), American business executive and philanthropist.
- Calvert DeForest (1921–2007), American actor and comedian, best known for his appearances on David Letterman's shows
- Carmaig de Forest (born 1957), American singer-songwriter, mainly on the ukulele
- Charles DeForest (1924–1996), American jazz singer and songwriter
- Charlotte Burgis DeForest (1879–1973), American missionary and educator
- Craig DeForest (born 1968), American astrophysicist
- Elizabeth Kellam de Forest (1898–1984), American landscape architect and editor
- Emmelie de Forest (born 1993), Danish singer-songwriter
- Erastus L. De Forest (1834–1888), American mathematician
- George Beach de Forest Jr. (1848–1932), American capitalist, bibliophile, and art collector
- Henry deForest (1855–1938), American railroad executive
- Henry S. De Forest (1847–1917), American politician from New York
- Jessé de Forest (c. 1576 to 1578–1624), leader of a group of Walloons who fled Europe due to religious persecutions
- Joe DeForest (born 1965), American college football coach
- John William De Forest (1826–1906), American soldier and writer of realistic fiction
- John de Forest (1907–1997), English golfer, later known as John de Bendern
- Julie Morrow Deforest (1882–1979), American impressionist painter
- Kenny DeForest (1986–2023), American comedian
- Lee de Forest (1873–1961), American inventor, electrical engineer, and early pioneer in important electronics
- Lockwood de Forest (1850–1932), American painter, interior designer and furniture designer
- Marian de Forest (1864–1935), American journalist, playwright, and women's movement figure
- Maurice de Forest (1879–1968), American-born British politician, soldier, and early motor racing driver
- Patsy De Forest (1894–1966), American silent film actress
- Robert E. De Forest (1845–1924), American politician
- Robert W. DeForest (1848–1931), American lawyer, executive, financier, and philanthropist
- Roy De Forest (1930–2007), American painter, sculptor, and teacher

== Given name ==
- DeForest Buckner (born 1994), American football defensive end
- DeForest Covan (1917–2007), American actor, dancer, and vaudeville performer
- D. C. Jarvis (1881–1966), American physician and writer
- DeForest Kelley (1920–1999), American actor, best known for playing Dr. Leonard McCoy in the Star Trek franchise
- DeForest H. Perkins (1872–1936), American Ku Klux Klan leader
- DeForest Porter (1840–1889), American jurist and politician
- DeForest Richards (1846–1903), American banker, farmer, and politician
- DeForest Soaries (born 1951), African-American Baptist minister, author and public advocate
- DeForest Stull (1885–1938), American football and basketball coach

== See also ==
- Luigi De La Forest (1668/1685–1738), Italian-French painter
- Simone Louise des Forest (1910–2004), French racing driver
- DeForest (disambiguation)
- Forest (name)
