= Forrest (given name) =

- Gender: Male

Origin
- Origin: Germanic

Other names
- Related names: Forest

Forrest is a masculine given name. Notable persons with the name include:

- Forrest (singer) (1953–2013), born Forrest Thomas, American singer popular in the UK and Netherlands
- Forrest J. Ackerman (1916–2008), American magazine editor, writer, and collector
- Forrest Adair (1865–1936), real estate dealer
- Forrest Aguirre (born 1969), American fantasy and horror author
- Forrest Clare Allen, better known as Phog Allen (1885–1974), American basketball coach
- Forrest H. Anderson (1913–1989), 17th Governor of Montana
- Forrest Baugher (1934–2017), American politician, former Washington state representative
- Forrest Beaty (born 1944), American track and field athlete
- Forrest Behm (1919–2015), American football player
- Forrest Bess (1911–1977), American painter and eccentric visionary
- Forrest Bird (1921–2015), American aviator, inventor, and biomedical engineer
- Forrest Blue (1945–2011), American football player
- George Forrest Browne (1833–1930), English bishop
- Forrest Burmeister (1913–1997), American football player
- Forrest Church (1948–2009), Unitarian Universalist minister, author, and theologian
- Forrest Claypool (born 1958), American politician, president of the Chicago Transit Authority
- Forrest Clingerman (1972-2024), American academic and author
- Forrest Compton (1925–2020), American actor
- Forrest B. Cox, better known as Frosty Cox (1908–1962), American basketball coach
- Forrest Craver (1875–1958), American college football player, coach and athletic director
- Forrest DeBernardi (1899–1970), American basketball player
- Forrest Dewar (1748–1817), Scottish surgeon
- Forrest C. Donnell (1884–1980), U.S. Senator and 40th Governor of Missouri
- Forrest Douds (1905–1979), American football player
- Forrest F. Dryden (1864–1932), president of Prudential Insurance Company of America (now Prudential Financial)
- Forrest Dunbar (born 1984), American politician and attorney
- Forrest England (1912–2002), American football coach and college athletic administrator
- Forrest E. Everhart (1922–1986), United States Army soldier
- Forrest Fezler (1949–2018), American golf course design consultant and golfer
- Forrest Frank (born 1995), American singer-songwriter and lead singer of the band Surfaces
- Forrest Fulton (1846–1926), British judge and Conservative politician
- Forrest Gainer (born 1979), Canadian rugby player
- Forrest Galante (born 1988), American wildlife biologist and television personality
- Forrest Gander (born 1956), American poet, essayist, novelist, critic, and translator
- Forrest Goodluck (born 1998), American actor
- Forrest Goodwin (1862–1913), United States Representative from Maine
- Forrest Gregg (1933–2019), American football player and coach
- Forrest Griffin (born 1979), American mixed martial artist
- Forrest Griffith (1928–2007), American football player
- Forrest M. Hall (1869–1961), American football player and coach
- Forrest Halsey (1877–1949), American screenwriter
- Forrest Hamer (born 1956), American poet, psychologist, and psychoanalyst
- Forrest Hamilton (1930–2021), American basketball player
- Forrest Kline (born 1983), lead singer, songwriter and guitarist of Hellogoodbye
- Forrest Knox (born 1956), Republican member of the Kansas Senate
- Forrest Lake (politician) (1868–1939), politician, banker, real estate investor, and member of the Florida House of Representatives
- Forrest Lamp (born 1994), American football player
- Forrest Lewis (1899–1977), American actor
- Forrest Li (born 1977/78), Singaporean billionaire businessman
- Forrest Lothrop (1924–2021), former American football coach
- Forrest McClendon, American stage actor, singer, and professor
- Forrest McPherson (1911–1989), American football player
- Forrest Mars Sr. (1904–1999), driving force of the Mars candy empire
- Forrest Mars Jr. (1931–2016), son of Forrest Mars, Sr. and one of the wealthiest people in the world
- Forrest David Matthews (born 1935), American politician
- Forrest McDonald (1927–2016), American historian
- Forrest Merrill (born 1996), American football player
- Forrest Mims (born 1944), American amateur scientist, magazine columnist, and author
- Forrest S. Mosten (born 1947), American lawyer
- Forrest Myers (born 1941), American sculptor
- Forrest O'Connor (born 1988), American singer-songwriter, mandolinist, and entrepreneur
- Forrest Parry (1921–2005), IBM engineer
- Forrest E. Peden (1913–1945), United States Army soldier
- Forrest S. Petersen (1922–1990), United States Navy aviator and test pilot
- Forrest Everett Pettengill (born 1973), American child actor
- Forrest Petz (born 1975), American mixed martial artist
- Forrest Phillips (1887–1972), farmer and political figure on Prince Edward Island
- Forrest Pogue (1912–1996), official United States Army historian during World War II
- Forrest Preston (born 1933), American billionaire businessman
- Forrest Pritchard (born 1974), American sustainable farmer and writer
- Forrest Redlich, Australian writer/producer of films and TV
- Forrest O. Rednour (1923–1943), United States Coast Guardsman
- Forrest Reid (1875–1947), Irish novelist, literary critic, and translator
- Forrest Rhyne (born 1999), American football player
- Forrest L. Richardson (born 1959), American golf course architect
- Forrest B. Royal (1893–1945), member of the United States Naval Academy class of 1915
- Forrest Sawyer (born 1940), American broadcast journalist
- Forrest W. Seymour (1905–1983), American journalist
- Forrest C. Shaklee (1894–1985), American nutritionist, founder of Shaklee Corporation
- Forrest Sherman (1896–1951), U.S. Navy admiral and Chief of Naval Operations
- Forrest Shreve (1878–1950), American botanist
- Forrest Smith (1886–1962), 42nd Governor of Missouri
- Forrest Smithson (1884–1962), American hurdler and 1908 Olympic gold medalist
- Forrest Sprowl (1919–1988), American basketball player and coach
- Forrest Stanley (1889–1969), American actor and screenwriter
- Forrest Taylor (1883–1965), American character actor
- Forrest Thompson (1918–1979), baseball player
- Forrest Towns (1914–1991), American track and field athlete, 1936 Olympic gold medalist
- Forrest Tucker (1919–1986), American actor
- Forrest Tucker (criminal) (1920–2004), American career criminal
- Forrest Twogood (1907–1972), American baseball player, college basketball and baseball coach, and college athletics administrator
- Forrest L. Vosler (1923–1992), Boeing B-17 Flying Fortress radio operator
- Forrest Ward (born 1949), American amateur heavyweight boxer
- Forrest Wall (born 1995), American professional baseball player
- Forrest White (1920–1994), American musical instruments industry executive
- Forrest Whitley (born 1997), American baseball player
- Forrest Wilson (1883–1942), American author and journalist
- Forrest L. Wood (1932–2020), American fisher and boat builder, founder of Ranger Boats

== Fictional characters ==
- Forrest, a playable character in the tactical role-playing video game Fire Emblem Fates
- Forrest Gates, a minor character in Season 4 of Buffy the Vampire Slayer
- Forrest Gump (character), the titular character of the 1986 novel and 1994 film adaptation
- Forrest, a character from the animated series Carl the Collector

== See also ==
- Forest (name)
