= Stull (surname) =

Stull is a surname. Notable people with the surname include:

- Bill Stull (born 1986), American football player
- Bob Stull (born 1945), American college athletics administrator
- DeForest Stull (1885–1938), American football and basketball coach
- Everett Stull (born 1971), American baseball player
- Howard W. Stull (1876–1949), American politician
- Leslie Stull (1908–1992), American politician from Nebraska
- Mari Stull (fl. 2010s), American lobbyist and blogger
- Michael J. Stull (1948–2002), American singer-songwriter
- Nelle Brooke Stull, American activist
- Olive Griffith Stull (1905–1969), American herpetologist
- Paul S. Stull (born 1936), American politician from Maryland
- Rob Stull (born 1960), American modern pentathlete and fencer
- Walter Stull (1879–1961), American actor and director

== See also ==
- Stull
