= Giovanni Bonati =

Giovanni Bonati may refer to:

- Giuseppe Bonati (1635–1681), also known as Giovanni Bonatti, Italian painter of the Baroque period
- Giovanni Bonati (gymnast), represented Italy in the 1908 Summer Olympics men's team
