= Laforest =

Laforest is a surname. Notable people with the surname include:

- Andrée Laforest, Canadian politician
- Bob Laforest (born 1963), Canadian ice hockey player
- Edmond Laforest (1876– 1915), Haitian poet
- Guy Laforest (born 1955), Canadian political scientist
- Jean-Guy Laforest (born 1944), Canadian politician
- Jean-Louis Dubut de Laforest (1853–1902), French author
- Jean-Yves Laforest (born 1949), Canadian politician
- Juliette Bussière Laforest-Courtois (1789–1853), Haitian teacher and journalist
- Mark Laforest (1962–2025), Canadian ice hockey goaltender
- Pete Laforest (born 1978), Canadian baseball catcher and manager
- Ty LaForest (1917–1947), Canadian baseball player

== See also ==
- De Forest (disambiguation)
- Laforest railway station, located in the community of Laforest, Ontario, Canada
- Leforest
