= Baugher =

Baugher is a surname. Notable people with the surname include:

- Charles Abba Baugher (1893–1962), American academic
- Danny Baugher (born 1984), American football player
- Forrest Baugher (1934–2017), American politician
- Henry Louis Baugher (1804–1868), American Lutheran clergyman and academic
