= Giovannino =

Giovannino (Italian for "Little John") may refer to:

- Giovannino (film), a 1976 comedy film
- Giovannino de' Grassi, an architect, sculptor and painter
- Giovannino Guareschi, a journalist, cartoonist and humorist
- Giovanni Lorenzo Lulier, also known as Giovannino del Violone, a Baroque composer and musician
- Giuseppe Bonati, also known as Giovannino del Pio, a Baroque painter
- San Giovannino dei Cavalieri, a church in Florence
- San Giovannino degli Scolopi, a church in Florence
