= Jean Forest (disambiguation) =

Jean Forest (1926–2024) was a Canadian politician, educator, and businesswoman.

Jean Forest may also refer to:

- Jean-Baptiste Forest (1636–1712), French landscape painter
- Jean-Claude Forest (1930–1998), French writer and illustrator of comics; creator of Barbarella
- Jean Kurt Forest (1909–1975), German violinist, violist, Kapellmeister, and composer
- Jean-Marie Forest (1752–1799), French general during the French Revolutionary Wars
