= Luigi De La Forest =

Italian-French painter

- Born: 1668 or 1685; Paris, France
- Died: November 1, 1738; Carpi, Duchy of Modena and Reggio
- Known for: Painting
- Notable work: Glory of Madonna and Saints Bonaventure, Bernard of Siena, and Pasquale Baylon, Saints Pasquale Baylon and Giovanni della Marca, St Francis, St Onofrio and other saints

Luigi De La Forest (Paris, 1668 or 1685 - Carpi, Emilia-Romagna, November 1, 1738) was an Italian-French painter, who was active in Modena.

== Biography ==
Forest moved to Modena around 1712, and painted a Glory of Madonna and Saints Bonaventure, Bernard of Siena, and Pasquale Baylon altarpiece for the church of Santa Margherita. From there he moved to Carpi, where he painted works for the church of San Nicolò and the adjacent Convent, including the canvas of Saints Pasquale Baylon and Giovanni della Marca (1719) at a side of the main entrance, St Francis (1725) for the main altar, and St Onofrio and other saints. La Forest also painted for the churches of S. Giuseppe and S. Sebastiano in Carpi, and the church in the villa di Fossoli. He also painted some genre subjects. He is related to the landscape painter by the name of Giovanni di Pietro Forest (Jean-Baptiste Forest, Paris, 1656–1712) who trained in Milan under Pier Francesco Mola.
