= Legal ghostwriting =

Legal ghostwriting is a form of unbundled legal services in the United States in which an attorney drafts a document on behalf of a client without formally appearing before the court. Instead, the client represents themself pro se.

== Purpose ==
The growth of pro se litigants can be attributed to the high cost of litigation, anti-lawyer sentiment, and the advent of do-it-yourself law services. However, self-represented litigants may still need legal representation in order and to navigate the litigation process.

Legal ghostwriting is one way in which clients can receive legal counsel while maintaining control of their case and avoiding higher legal costs. Attorneys offering legal ghostwriting services often charge a flat fee rather than billing by the hour as is typical for full-service attorneys.

== American Bar Association ==
The ABA formally endorsed the delivery of legal ghostwriting services by attorneys to pro se clients in 2007. In a formal opinion, the ABA deemed the practice consistent with Rule 1.2(c) of the American Bar Association Model Rules of Professional Conduct which allows lawyers to unbundle their services to clients. According to the ABA opinion paper, lawyers should generally disclose the fact that papers were prepared by an attorney, but need not disclose their name of firm.

== New York ==
The New York County Law Association agreed with the ABA approach to legal ghostwriting in a 2010 ethics opinion paper. In that decision, NYCLA found that “…it is now ethically permissible for an attorney, with the informed consent of his or her client, to play a limited role and prepare pleadings and other submissions for a pro se litigant without disclosing the lawyer’s participation to the tribunal and adverse counsel. Disclosure of the fact that a pleading or submission was prepared by counsel need only be made ‘where necessary.”

The Second Circuit court in 2011 ruled that it was not improper for an attorney to ghostwrite legal pleadings on behalf of a self-represented litigant.

== Criticism ==
Ethical concerns may arise for attorneys offering legal ghostwriting services to clients. A common criticism of legal ghostwriting is that it gives the self-represented litigant an unfair advantage because judges often grant pro se litigants leeway in the courtroom to make up for their lack of experience. Critics argue that when clients employ an attorney ghostwriter, they should not be entitled to that privilege. For this reason, the New York State Bar Association requires attorneys to disclose their assistance in papers submitted to the court. Attorneys are not, however, required to disclose their name or firm.

Other critics are concerned that when an attorney provides legal ghostwriting services to a client without disclosing his or her name, the attorney might be misleading the court, or seeking to avoid malpractice lawsuits or court rules against frivolous lawsuits.

However, the ABA in its 2007 opinion paper claimed that these ethical concerns were overstated. It concluded that:

"[b]ecause there is no reasonable concern that a litigant appearing pro se will receive an unfair benefit from a tribunal as a result of behind-the-scenes legal assistance, the nature or extent of such assistance is immaterial and need not be disclosed. Similarly, we do not believe that nondisclosure of the fact of legal assistance is dishonest so as to be prohibited by Rule 8.4(c). Whether it is dishonest for the lawyer to provide undisclosed assistance to a pro se litigant turns on whether the court would be misled by failure to disclose such assistance. The lawyer is making no statement at all to the forum regarding the nature or scope of the representation, and indeed, may be obliged under Rules 1.210 and 1.611 not to reveal the fact of the representation. Absent an affirmative statement by the client, that can be attributed to the lawyer, that the documents were prepared without legal assistance, the lawyer has not been dishonest within the meaning of Rule 8.4(c). For the same reason, we reject the contention that a lawyer who does not appear in the action circumvents court rules requiring the assumption of responsibility for their pleadings. Such rules apply only if a lawyer signs the pleading and thereby makes an affirmative statement to the tribunal concerning the matter. Where a pro se litigant is assisted, no such duty is assumed. We conclude that there is no prohibition in the Model Rules of Professional Conduct against undisclosed assistance to pro se litigants, as long as the lawyer does not do so in a manner that violates rules that otherwise would apply to the lawyer’s conduct."

== See also ==
- eLawyering
- Ghostwriting
- Unbundled legal services
