= Stull =

Stull may refer to:

- Stull, Kansas, an unincorporated community in USA
- Stull, Pennsylvania, a populated place in Wyoming County, Pennsylvania in USA
- Stull (surname), people with the surname
- 31113 Stull, an asteroid
- Stull (EP), an extended play by Urge Overkill

== See also ==
- Stull Observatory, an observatory at Alfred University in the United States
- Stull stoping, a mining method
