= Unbundled legal services =

Method of legal representation

Unbundled legal services, also known as limited scope representation and discrete task representation, is a method of legal representation in which an attorney and client agree to limit the scope of the attorney’s involvement in a lawsuit or other legal action, leaving responsibility for those other aspects of the case to the client in order to save the client money and give them more control. Unbundled legal services, limited scope retainers or discrete task representation are available in multiple jurisdictions, including the United States, as well as the Canadian provinces of British Columbia and Ontario. One common use of unbundled legal services is family law, as a case is often too complex for a pro se litigant to handle alone but the cost of full-service legal representation is often prohibitive.

== Purpose ==
Unbundled legal services are employed as an attempt to lower costs for the client by reducing the amount of time an attorney spends – and therefore the amount the attorney bills – on a legal matter. An American Bar Association study estimates that "fewer than three in ten of the legal problems of low-income households are brought to the justice system and only four in ten for moderate income households." According to the New York State Bar Association, "[u]nbundling is seen as a way to increase legal access for middle income consumers..." "Clients find unbundling attractive because it saves money and gives them more control over the process and strategy decisions."

Unbundled attorneys are more likely to offer flat fee pricing to complete tasks, as opposed to the more common practice of hourly billing by full-service attorneys. Depending on the jurisdiction, they may provide legal ghostwriting services, that is, drafting legal documents on behalf of the client without formally appearing before the court. They may offer legal coaching to clients who plan to represent themselves pro se in the courtroom. Or they might do the opposite, agreeing that clients handle their lawsuits up until the trial phase, at which point the attorney takes over.

== Evolution ==
The phrase “unbundled legal services” has been attributed to UCLA law professor Forrest S. Mosten. In 2000, “Woody” Mosten wrote “Unbundling Legal Services: A Guide to Delivering Legal Services a la Carte,” which was published by the American Bar Association. Mosten, a California attorney, specializes in family law and divorce mediation. Throughout his career he has emphasized the importance of access to justice, which likely contributed to his involvement in promoting unbundled legal services. Mosten has received the Lifetime Achievement Award for Innovations in Legal Access from the ABA Section of Delivery of Legal Services, and the Lawyer as Problem Solver Award from the ABA Section on Dispute Resolution.

In 2017, Mosten's "Unbundled Legal Services: A Family Lawyer's Guide" (co-written with Elizabeth Potter Scully), reflecting years of changes and development in the unbundling field, was also published by the American Bar Association. He was also recently a guest on the Unbundled Attorney Mastermind Podcast discussing the history and future of unbundled legal services.

Divorce is an area of law that can lend itself to unbundling particularly well, and the development of unbundled legal services has grown largely out of the family law field. Another California family law attorney, M. Sue Talia, helped popularize unbundled legal services. Building upon Mosten’s work, Talia wrote several publications designed to help clients get the most out of unbundling.

Largely because of the advocacy by Mosten and Talia, among others, for the adoption of unbundled legal services by mainstream lawyers, which also emphasized new ethical guidelines for unbundling while maintaining the established rules, the California State Bar formally recognized unbundled legal services as a legitimate and important practice.

Other states soon followed California’s lead in officially permitting unbundled legal services. With its growing acceptance in the legal profession, unbundled legal services began to evolve into other areas of law. Unbundled attorneys also began combining this new representation technique with emerging technologies such as teleconferencing and cloud computing. One of the early adopters of e-lawyering has been North Carolina lawyer Stephanie Kimbro, who implemented a “virtual law office” in 2006 when she focused her practice on estate planning and business law. Kimbro has since expanded her practice but continues to deliver her services solely by virtual office. She received an ABA Award for Excellence in eLawyering in 2009.

One of the last areas of unbundled legal services to be embraced by state bar associations has been legal ghostwriting. Legal ghostwriting usually entails an attorney drafting a legal document – such as a summons and complaint, an answer or an appellate brief – on behalf of a client. The client maintains responsibility for the other aspects of the lawsuit, such as filing, corresponding with the court and opposing counsel and generally prosecuting their case. Under this agreement, the attorney ghostwriter is not the attorney of record. Instead, the client appears in the action pro se, meaning they represent themselves. The unbundled attorney might in this case inform the court of their assistance drafting the document.

In 2007 the ABA relaxed its professional ethical rules to expressly permit unbundled legal services and legal ghostwriting in Rule 1.2(c). In April 2010, the New York County Law Association echoed the ABA opinion by formally giving its blessing to the practice of legal ghostwriting as consistent with the state bar’s ethical rules. The NYCLA Ethics Committee on Professional Ethics in its Opinion 742 stated that “…it is now ethically permissible for an attorney, with the informed consent of his or her client, to play a limited role and prepare pleadings and other submissions for a pro se litigant without disclosing the lawyer’s participation to the tribunal and adverse counsel. Disclosure of the fact that a pleading or submission was prepared by counsel need only be made ‘where necessary.”

Certain jurisdictions have called for the implementation of clinics in law schools to teach unbundling legal services to students in a practical setting, and to encourage future lawyers to use the practice.

== Criticisms ==
Opponents of unbundled legal services often cite ethical concerns about the professional responsibility of a lawyer for his or her client. For one, an attorney owes the court a "duty of candor" in his or her dealings with the court. By working on a lawsuit on behalf of a client but failing to appear, some courts have held this duty is violated.

Moreover, full-service attorneys handle all aspects of a case and can be liable for legal malpractice should they be negligent in their representation of clients. Critics claim that, should an attorney limit the scope of his or her representation of a client, they might escape a malpractice claim despite having committed malpractice. Some fear that a lack of communication between lawyer and client can lead to confusion about who is responsible for what, and that important issues of a client's case can fall through the cracks.

State bar associations and courts have split on the ethics of unbundling when it comes to legal ghostwriting. Some jurisdictions have ruled that ghostwriting by attorneys is prohibited, claiming that failing to disclose their assistance to a self-represented client would be misleading to the court and their adversary in the lawsuits. Others oppose legal ghostwriting because they believe it would allow an attorney to evade responsibility for a frivolous lawsuit filed by their client.

Certain critics have argued that legal ghostwriting actually gives the self-represented litigant an unfair advantage over their adversary, even when that adversary has an attorney. The reason for this is that judges have had a history of giving pro se litigants more leeway in the courtroom to make up for their lack of experience. For example, a person appearing pro se might be allowed to fix a procedural error but had a lawyer made the same mistake, their error would have led to some adverse consequence. When a self-represented litigant uses an attorney as a ghostwriter, critics argue the litigant should not be entitled to any special treatment. However, proponents of legal ghostwriting point out that while judges might grant certain flexibility to pro se clients on procedural matters, no judge would rule in favor of a party simply because they lacked an attorney. To avoid the potential for this unfair advantage, some jurisdictions, like New York, require an attorney to disclose in papers submitted to the court that they were prepared by an attorney, but attorneys are not required to disclose their name or firm.

Many jurisdictions look at the intent of the attorney for legal ghostwriting. Where an attorney used the ghostwriting technique to avoid disclosing that he was not admitted in the state where the case was filed, it may be ruled unethical. However the American Bar Association Model Rules of Professional Conduct have been amended to allow for legal ghostwriting where the attorney merely intends to offer unbundled legal services to a client.

Another ethical concern concerning unbundled legal services is that it leads to the commoditization of law. Rather than treating the law as a profession, critics believe unbundling might lead to a factory-like approach, where cases are treated with a "one-size-fits-all" approach.

However, Richard Susskind in his 2008 book "The End of Lawyers: Rethinking the Nature of Legal Services," argues that, as technology progresses, lawyers might have no choice but to move toward commoditization. With the emergence of do-it-yourself companies that sell blank legal documents like LegalZoom, lawyers must compete with new low-cost options. Further driving down attorney fees has been outsourcing, where attorneys educated in American law but not necessarily licensed in any state provide services to law firms at reduced rates.

== See also ==
- eLawyering
- Legal ghostwriting
