= Virtual law firm =

Online legal company

A virtual law firm is a legal practice that does not have a brick-and-mortar office, but operates from the homes or satellite offices of its lawyers, usually delivering services to clients at a distance utilizing modern technology for communication. Most have a central function responsible for the accounting and administrative side of the practice. Virtual law firms are formed and regulated in the same way as traditional law firms, but their lawyers may be self-employed consultants rather than partners or employees.

== Features ==
According to earlier sources, a virtual law firm has the following characteristics:

1. Has a stable core group of attorneys;
2. Operates under one legal entity, such as a partnership or a proprietorship.
3. Has established collaborative relationships with other, specialized law firms that possess expertise that’s occasionally needed;
4. Is glued together with appropriate computer and telecommunications technology such as project management software or a Virtual Law Office (VLO)
5. Tends to have low overhead because most employees conduct remote work.
6. Expands and reduces personnel as needed.

== eLawyering ==
The concept of the virtual law firm has been associated with the term, "eLawyering" referring to a law firm that delivers legal services online, either directly to consumers through their law firm websites or through legal matching platforms. The American Bar Association has released a statement on minimum requirements for law firms delivering legal service online. The guidelines equate the concept of "eLawyering" with the virtual practice of law and the concept of the virtual law firm. According to the American Bar Association guidelines, eLawyering or virtual law practice refers specifically to the delivery of legal services online through a section of a law firm's website that is a known as a secure "client portal." Under this definition, a "virtual law firm" is not simply a lawyer who does not have a physical office and communicates with clients by email. Instead, the law firm must have a secure section of its website where a client can log in with a unique user name and password.

The purpose of the eLawyering Task Force minimum requirements is to provide guidance to attorneys who wish to deliver legal services online on how to comply with the professional rules of conduct that govern law practice in each U.S. state. Conducting business through a log-in portal is different from conducting business over email, as the log-in portal is required to be secure and must adhere to strict regulations and standards. A completely virtual law office will conduct all business online, while some small practices choose to integrate a VLO log-in portal to provide more options to their clients.

== Virtual Law Office ==
A Virtual Law Office, or VLO, is an online law practice that exists through a secure log-in portal and can be accessed by both client and attorney anywhere an internet connection is available. In contrast to a traditional law practice, a VLO allows attorneys and clients to communicate securely over the internet, download or upload documents, and conduct other business normally conducted face-to-face over the internet.

The features offered by a virtual law office depend on the particular vendor, but basic features centre around a web-based software-as-a-service (SaaS) application that stores documents as part of a cloud computing system. By storing documents and information on an external server and allowing log-in through a secure, encrypted portal, documents can be accessed and shared by client and attorney.

By 2014, there are at least 15 virtual law firms in the United States with more than 5 members and more in Britain.

== See also ==
- Legal ghostwriting
- Unbundled legal services
