= Forest Vance =

American football player (born 1981)

Forest Vance (born 16 April 1981, in Bellingham, WA) is a former American football player and personal trainer. He played in the National Football League for both the Green Bay Packers and the Kansas City Chiefs and previously played college football for the University of California, Davis.

== Early years ==
Vance graduated from Colfax High School in 1999 where he lettered in football and track.

=== College career ===
Vance started in 48 straight games for UC Davis, earning letters each season (2000-2003). He moved to the guard position as a Senior after playing tackle his first three seasons and was selected for the Division I – AA Independent All-Star team in 2003. Vance was an all-region honoree as a junior, in addition to receiving Associated Press Little All-America third-team honors. While at UC Davis, Vance played tight end, offensive tackle, outside linebacker, and defensive end. He graduated from UC Davis with a degree in Communications.

== Professional career ==
=== NFL career ===
Vance earned a spot on the opening-day training camp rosters of the Green Bay Packers (2004) and Kansas City Chiefs (2005). Vance signed with Green Bay as a undrafted free agent on April 30, 2004 as an offensive guard. He was one of the Packers' final cuts but was placed on injured reserve after he tore the cartilage in his right knee. Vance was picked up by the Chiefs in August 2004 but was released in 2005 due to injury.

=== Physical Therapy and Personal Training ===
After his football career, Vance earned a Master of Science in Human Movement from A.T. Still University in Mesa, Arizona, as well as his personal trainer certifications through the National Academy of Sports Medicine and American College of Sports Medicine. He also is a certified corrective exercise specialist and performance enhancement specialist through the National Academy of Sports Medicine. He has been featured on KCRA-TV as an expert in kettlebell training and self-published a book in 2009 entitled "No Gym? No Excuse!". In addition to that book he has also published a book named, "The CORE kettlebell challenge" published in 2019.
