= Forest Sun =

American singer-songwriter

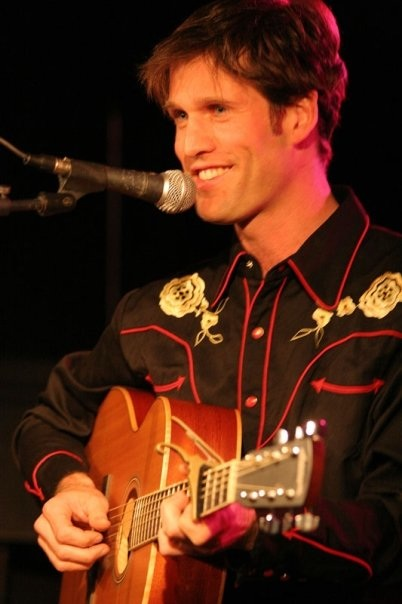
- Forest Sun live in concert

Background information
- Born: August 6, 1973 (age 52); Glens Falls, New York, United States
- Genres: Americana
- Occupation: Musician
- Instruments: Voice, guitar, piano, drums, ukulele, resonator guitar
- Years active: 1999–present
- Label: Painted Sun Records
- Website: www.forestsun.com

Forest Sun (born August 6, 1973) is an Americana singer-songwriter from San Francisco, California, United States.

== History ==
He was born Forest Sun Schumacher, in Glens Falls, New York, United States.

In 1999, Forest Sun created the independent record label, Painted Sun Records, and released his first album, Not Afraid. The following year he released Plenty, in San Francisco, California. AllMusic noted that "in these ten small gems, Sun offers the Muse the gift of his voice to write and sing though. Traces of rock & roll's past, present, and hopefully future mingle with progressive folk music, textured, moody pop, and a healthy sense of literary finesse." In 2002, Forest Sun performed at the Strawberry Music Festival, and Shoreline Amphitheatre, opening for Bonnie Raitt and Lyle Lovett. In 2003, he performed at the Concord Pavilion opening for Jackson Browne, Keb Mo, and Steve Earle

For The Story (2003) was again commented on my AllMusic noting "The highlight is the album's centerpiece track, "Always," a jazzy piano-based shuffle featuring guest vocals by the Be Good Tanyas' Jolie Holland." He later hosted Songbird Radio on KWMR in Point Reyes Station, California. In 2005, he played at the Mountain Winery, opening for the Beach Boys. Walk Through Walls was released on May 13, 2005.

In 2008, prompted by his mother's battle with cancer, Forest Sun began a benefit project to support people with cancer and their families by hosting benefit concerts in Santa Fe, New Mexico, which led to producing compilation albums called Songs for Laura. These albums brought together over forty artists such as Sean Hayes, Animal Liberation Orchestra, Brett Dennen, Matt the Electrician, Tom Freund, Danny Schmidt, Anaïs Mitchell, The Mammals and Devon Sproule. So Nice and Harlequin Goodnight, featuring songs with ALO and Sean Hayes, were issued in 2008. The following year, Forest Sun added the musical collaboration of Ingrid Serban and the two begin to tour as a duo.

Forest Sun released his first children's album, Just for Fun (2010), which was a collection of original songs and Americana classics such as "You Are My Sunshine," and "Polly Wolly Doodle". The recordings featured members of Marley's Ghost and Ingrid Serban. In 2012, Forest Sun released Just Begun. The album featured Tucsonian musicians such as Winston Watson, drummer for Bob Dylan and Lenny Kravitz, Jacob Valenzuela, trumpet player for Calexico, and was recorded in Tucson, Arizona, at the Wavelab Studios.

In 2018 thanks to his Kickstarter backers Forest began releasing a new song every month culminating in a new album to be released in October 2019. As an actor Forest has appeared in the film “Who’s there?” (directed by Cassie Jaye and premiering at the Tall Grass Film Festival) Forest played a fireman and his song “Long Day” is in the soundtrack during the closing credits. “All Sales Final” Directed by Ingrid Serban won “Best Short Film made on a Smart Device” at the Albuquerque Film and Music Festival.“Elusory” directed by Scott Steiner premiered at the Amazon Underground Film Festival in Brazil. Forest composed the soundtrack to the upcoming feature documentary “Free Trip To Egypt”.

== Discography ==
Year	Album
1999	Not Afraid
2001	Plenty
2003	For The Story
2005	Walk Through Walls
2006	Dancing Again (Japanese release on Buffalo Records)
2008	Songs for Laura
2008	Harlequin Goodnight
2008	So Nice
2009	Songs for Laura Volume 2
2010	Just for Fun
2012	Just Begun
2019	Brighter Day
2022	follow the love
2021	Stubborn Breathing Heart
