= Forest Maniac =

Unidentified Russian serial killer

- Other name: "The Goblin"

Details
- Victims: 12–18
- Span of crimes: 1993 – 1997 (possibly 1993–1998)
- Country: Russia
- State: Samara
- Date apprehended: Suspect arrested 30 July 1997; served prison sentence and released in 2012

The Forest Maniac (Russian: Лесной маньяк) is the nickname given to an unidentified Russian serial killer who killed at least 12 people in the Samara Oblast from 1993 to 1997, predominantly targeting couples. During the investigation, several suspects were identified and one was convicted for two murders, but his guilt in the remaining killings remains a subject of debate.

== Murders ==
=== Modus operandi ===
As victims, the killer would choose couples who secluded themselves in their cars around Samara and its suburbs, always at night. Typically, he would observe potential victims and wait until one of them got out of the car, whereupon he would stab said victim several times and then kill the remaining occupant. In one instance, in order to lure the victims out of the car, he hid in the bushes and pretended to cry out for help. In at least one survivor's account, he shot at their car with a sawed-off shotgun.

Some have speculated that the killings might have been motivated by the mystical or the occult, due to the claim that some of the victims' bodies had supposedly been posed in the shape of a cross.

=== Murders ===
The first recorded attack dates back to September 1993, when the body of a young woman bearing multiple stab wounds was found in the woods near the village of Upravlencheskiy. Approximately several kilometres away, a VAZ-2108 was found containing the body of the woman's boyfriend, who was also stabbed numerous times. An autopsy determined that both victims had been killed on the same night, likely only minutes apart. At the time, however, local authorities believed this was done by a local gang.

The next murder occurred on 18 May 1996, near the settlement of Sorokiny Khutor. The Maniac attacked Yegor Sidorenko and his girlfriend, who had secluded themselves in a wooded area not far from the highway - the woman was stabbed to death, while Sidorenko lost consciousness. Despite his injuries, Sidorenko eventually woke up and crawled to the highway, where he was soon picked up by a passing motorist.

After being given first aid and his condition was stable enough, Sidorenko provided a description of the killer to the authorities, who developed a facial composite from his testimony. According to Sidorenko, the killer was wearing a camouflage suit and a mask, and wielded a spade and a knife. He claimed that at around 3:00 AM, his girlfriend got out of the car and noticed that somebody was hiding behind some trees. When she told him this, Sidorenko got out of the car and attempted to talk to the man, but was then stabbed 11 times. While still conscious, he saw the man rush after his girlfriend in the parking lot, whom he knocked down and repeatedly stabbed.

On 24 July of that same year, the charred bodies of a man and a woman were found in the village of Studenyi Ovrag. Despite the fact that they were severely burned, the coroners determined that both had been stabbed to death and thus listed them as victims of the serial killer. The next attack took place on the early morning of 3 September, when the killer came across the car of Mamuka Santeladze, who was with his girlfriend Alevtina Butkevich on a road near Novosemeykino. He shot the car's side window with a sawed-off shotgun and waited until Santeladze got out before he attacked him with a knife. However, Santeladze took advantage of this and grabbed Butkevich by the arm, after which the pair fled into the woods and managed to get out to the highway, where they were later picked up by another car. Once at the police station, they both told the officers what had happened and gave a description of what their attacker looked like.

The next murder occurred on the morning of 23 November, when Dmitri Korotkov and his girlfriend, Elena Kulakovskaya, were murdered near Samara. After the killings, the criminal stole their VAZ-2106 and drove along the Krasnoglinsky Highway, where the car was spotted by traffic police. The officers ordered him to stop, but the man ignored their demands, got out of the car and ran into the woods. During the chase, he engaged in a scuffle with them and shot one of the officers with the sawed-off shotgun, seriously wounding him and allowing him to escape. When the officers opened the trunk of the car, they found Korotkov's body inside with his throat cut and a gunshot wound to the head. A camouflage jacket was found next to his corpse. Kulakovskaya's body could not be found at the time and she was declared missing, until her decomposing remains were found in May 1997.

In total, from May 1996 to early 1997, ten people were killed around the various suburbs of Samara, all of which corresponded with the attack pattern of the Forest Maniac.

== Arrest of Dmitry Voroshilov ==
In addition to the designated task force, officers from the Samara Police Department were also involved in the search for the serial killer. In an attempt to catch him red-handed, officers posing as couples were placed in various areas around Samara, but this did not bring any results.

In the course of the investigation, it was suggested that the murderer could be a law enforcement officer, as the crimes were committed near several penal colonies and the hands of one of the victims were tried with a trouser belt with handcuffs mounted on it. Soon after, about 1,500 officers were questioned and four were selected as possible suspects. In April 1997, blood, hair, and clothing samples from the murdered men and the four suspects were sent for examination, and by the mid-summer period of that year, the investigators received the results. According to the researchers, the items recovered at the crime scene belonged to 30-year-old Dmitry Viktorovich Voroshilov, a Major of the Internal Service and Chief of Security at a penal colony near Samara. Due to this finding, Voroshilov was arrested on 30 July 1997. He steadfastly denied responsibility and pleaded not guilty, and as investigators failed to link him to most of the crimes, he was only charged with two of the murders and three attempted murders.

In November 1997, the court ordered that Voroshilov must undergo a forensic medical examination and he was then transported to the Serbsky Center in Moscow. The examiners found that while he was sane, he showed signs of epilepsy and psychopathy. Suspicions against him began to mount after it was confirmed that Voroshilov was fond of martial arts, had considerable strength and knew how to utilize hand-to-hand and knife fighting techniques. His coach noted that Voroshilov was a highly skilled combatant who could break a brick suspended in the air with one blow and could fight with both hands.

Most of his acquaintances and friends characterized Voroshilov extremely negatively, and some even accused him of being a misogynist due to his attitude towards female staff at the penal colony. Reportedly, this stemmed from his short-lived romance with a woman named Marina, who left the area sometime in 1994. As a result, Voroshilov had to be disciplined repeatedly and was even sent to a psychiatric hospital, but was found to be sane and allowed to return on duty. On the other hand, however, one of his neighbours refused to believe that he was capable of such things and claimed that Voroshilov would never hurt a fly.

At the end of 1997, Voroshilov took a polygraph test, and while the results were inconclusive, it showed a high probability that he might be involved with the murders. While inspecting Voroshilov's home, investigators were unable to find any of the weapons the surviving victims claimed their assailant had used. They were also unable to prove that he had ever been seen with anyone who had similar weapons or could have possibly sold one to him. One piece of circumstantial evidence was the camouflage jacket found in Korotkov's car, which his relatives claimed did not belong to him - this inclined the investigators to believe that it was left in the trunk by the killer. Said jacket was subjected to more than two dozen forensic examinations, only six of which were included in the indictment - the ones that indicated it belonged to Voroshilov. Examinations on the blood group were also inconclusive, as blood stains found on the jacket corresponded to three different blood groups and it belonged both to Korotkov and Voroshilov, who shared the same blood group. No other forensic evidence could conclusively provide any evidence of Voroshilov's guilt, and Voroshilov himself denied that the jacket belonged to him.

=== Voroshilov's lawsuit against the investigators ===
Throughout the course of the investigation, Voroshilov filed several dozen complaints to various courts, claiming that he had been beaten and tortured during interrogations. According to him, during an interrogation on 4 September 1997, investigators strangled him with a scarf and plastic bag and even sodomized him with the neck of an empty glass bottle for four hours, all in order to extract a confession out of him. As a result, six policemen alleged to have participated in the torture were indicted on 2 October, on charges of abuse of power and unnecessary use of violence.

On 6 July 1998, the criminal case against the officers was transferred to the Samara District Court. Eventually, in 1999, five of the accused officers were brought before the court, but on 26 October of that year, the case was returned to the prosecutor's office for additional investigation. During the trial, the court drew attention to the results of a comprehensive forensic psychological and psychiatric examination which determined that Voroshilov suffered from a mixed personality disorder. According to the examiners' findings, he showed character traits such as secrecy, mendacity and a pathological tendency to blame others for his mistakes. Ultimately, the court found the officers not guilty on all charges, noting that it was possible Voroshilov had made the torture claims up. Regardless, all of them were later dismissed from the police department.

== Voroshilov's trial ==
The trial began in early 1999. The prosecution's main evidence was the results of various forensic examinations and the testimony of surviving victims. One of the officers who had chased after the killer who had stolen Korotkov's car allegedly identified Voroshilov as the man, but his testimony was ruled as questionable, as the officer himself admitted that the suspect's face was illuminated by the vehicle's headlights for only a few seconds.

Two of the Forest Maniac's surviving victims - Mamuka Santeladze and Alevtina Butkevich - could not identify Voroshilov as their assailant. In his testimony, Santeladze insisted that they were not victims of the serial killer, but of an unrelated opportunistic criminal who was after their car. Among Voroshilov's personal belongings were an Afghan coat and a sports windbreaker that had blood stains matching Santeladze's blood type, but this did not match the camouflage jacket the attacker had supposedly been wearing. Nikolai Filimonov, Voroshilov's lawyer, also pointed out that he could not have been involved in the attack, as there were no traces of Santeladze's blood found on the camouflage jacket. Voroshilov himself also actively participated in the trial, filing various motions in every session trying to disprove the prosecution's arguments and claims.

In spite of the inconsistencies and unreliable testimony, the Samara District Court found Voroshilov guilty of two murders (Korotkov and Kulakovskaya) and three assaults (Santeladze, Butkevich and the wounded officer). As a result, he was sentenced to 15 years imprisonment - the only available punishment according to the Criminal Code applied at the time. Throughout the proceedings, Voroshilov kept his composure and remained emotionless while the verdict was read out. After the trial concluded, he filed an appeal to the Supreme Court, which reviewed the case and then upheld his sentence on 6 March 2000. Voroshilov was then transferred to serve his sentence at a penal colony in Ryazan Oblast.

== Release and aftermath ==
In 2005, Voroshilov and his lawyers filed another complaint to the European Court of Human Rights in the hope that they would reverse the conviction and commute his sentence. On 8 December 2005, the Court issued its opinion on the case, rejecting most of the complaints filed by Voroshilov. He served out the sentence in its entirety and was released on 30 July 2012.

The identity of the Forest Maniac remains a subject of debate. After Voroshilov's arrest, six more murders took place in Samara from 1997 to 1998, all of which were eerily similar to the ones committed by the serial killer. This had led some to question Voroshilov's guilt, while investigators continue to insist that he was the perpetrator, pointing out that the killings ceased after his arrest.

== See also ==
- List of Russian serial killers
