= Charlotte Burgis DeForest =

Missionary and president of Kobe College

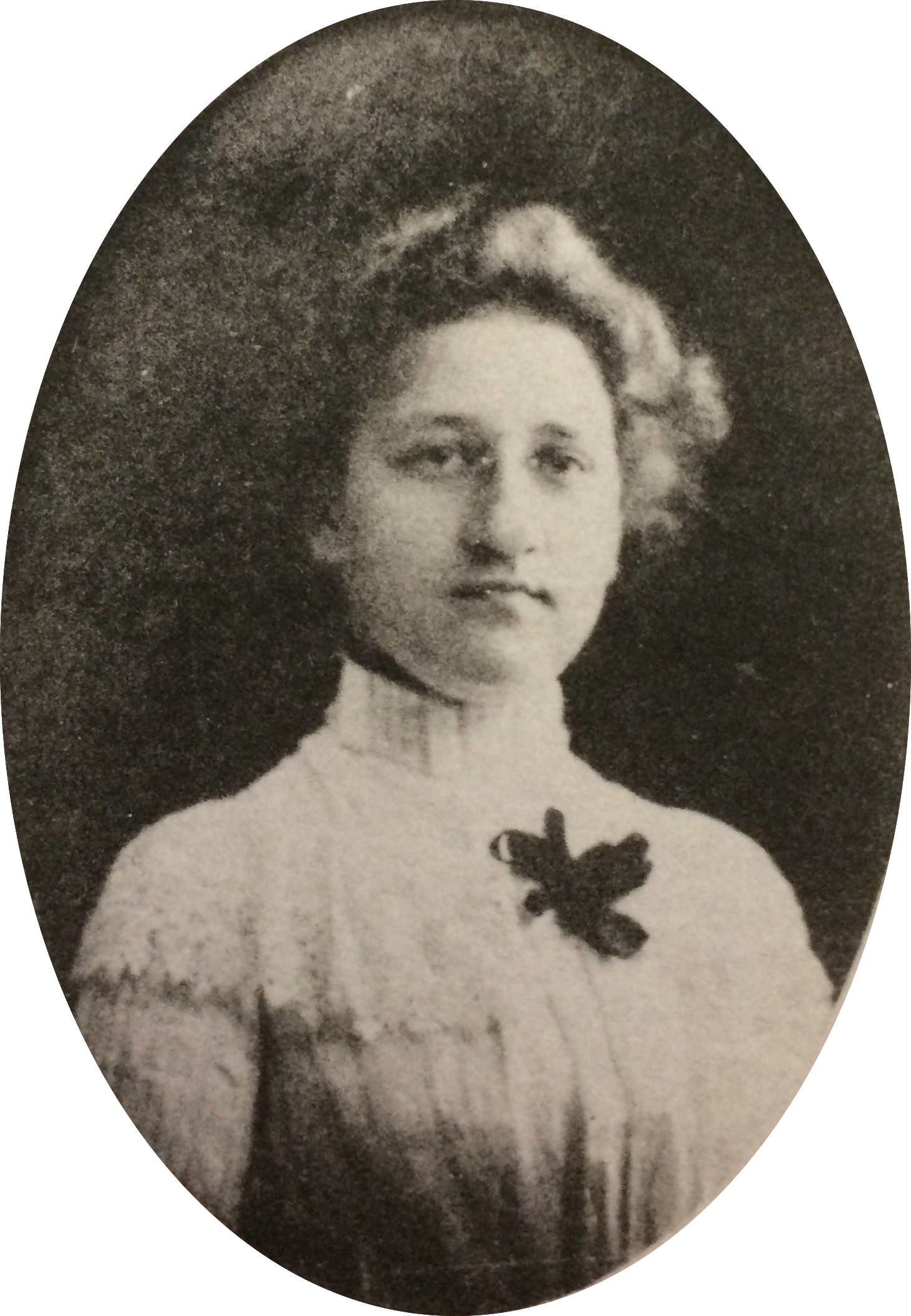
Charlotte Burgis DeForest (1879–1973)

Charlotte Burgis DeForest (February 23, 1879 – July 2, 1973) was an American missionary to Japan. She was born in Osaka, Japan, to missionary parents, Elizabeth Starr and John Hyde DeForest. After attending boarding school in Germany and graduating from high school in Massachusetts, DeForest attended Smith College in 1897, obtaining her bachelor's degree in 1901. In 1903, DeForest volunteered for the American Board of Commissioners for Foreign Missions and returned to Japan as a missionary. From 1904 to 1907, DeForest traveled to various schools, including Kobe College, where she both taught English and completed a language study. After teaching English, Bible and music studies there, DeForest became President of Kobe College in 1915. In 1920, DeForest returned stateside to study at the University of Chicago and obtained an honorary L.H.D. from Smith College. From 1921 until the beginning of World War II in 1940 when she resigned her title as President of Kobe College, DeForest traveled back and forth from Japan and the United States. During World War II, DeForest returned to the United States, where she volunteered at the Boston Immigration Station to help Japanese detainees, taught a nine-month course in Japanese at Pomona College and eventually began working at the Manzanar Relocation Center in Manzanar, California. After the end of World War II, DeForest returned once more to Kobe College as a teacher, until leaving Japan in 1950, when she received the Fourth Class of the Order of the Sacred Treasure. In 1951, DeForest retired in Claremont, California, until her death.

Throughout her life, DeForest published several books and articles including The Evolution of a Missionary, a biography of her father's life in Japan published in 1914, The Prancing Pony: Nursery Rhymes from Japan, a collection of traditional Japanese nursery rhymes translated into English that won the Children's Spring Festival Book Award in 1968, Poems Down the Years (1967), History of Kobe College (1960), and an article detailing her time at the Manzanar Relocation Center entitled "Closing Out Manzanar: Ralph P. Merritt as I Knew Him" which was published in the Pacific Citizen in 1966.

Some of DeForest's personal correspondence and belongings are located in several archival collections in the United States including the Yale University Divinity School Library, the Charles E. Young Research Library at UCLA, and the Sophia Smith Collection at Smith College.

== Education ==
Charlotte DeForest attended Smith College and obtained her bachelor's degree in 1901. While at Smith, DeForest was a member of the Missionary and Alpha societies as well as an editor of the Smith College Monthly. DeForest's sister, Sarah Lydia, two years her senior, also attended Smith at the same time. After graduating, Sarah Lydia went on to marry a missionary and live in China.

== World War II ==
DeForest returned to the United States in 1940 after resigning her position as President of Kobe College. DeForest worked in the American Board Library and volunteered at the Boston Immigration Station from 1941 to 1943.

=== Pomona College ===
In 1943, DeForest taught a nine-month course on Japanese at Pomona College in Claremont, California.

=== Manzanar War Relocation Center ===
In 1944, DeForest was hired as a junior counselor at the Manzanar War Relocation Center. Due to her past experiences and her fluency in the Japanese language, War Relations Authority (WRA) officials saw DeForest as a valuable asset to Manzanar. DeForest's mastery of Japanese was especially useful in figuring out what property, legal documents, and other relevant holdings the internees had as resettlement began increasing in speed. While at Manzanar, DeForest wrote a set of journal entries about both the day-to-day operations of the camp as well as large events that occurred during her stay, including the lifting of the ban that created military areas for the internment of Japanese and Japanese-Americans, the dropping of the atomic bomb, and the surrender of Japan.

Along with being a junior counselor, DeForest also worked as a translator during military trials in 1945. Military trials were held to determine whether or not an internee was disloyal to the United States. Anyone who was found to be disloyal was moved to another internment camp at Tule Lake.

== Publications ==
- The Woman and the Leaven in Japan (1923)
- The Evolution of a Missionary (1914)
- The Prancing Pony: Nursery Rhymes from Japan (1967)
- History of Kobe College (1960)
- "Closing out Manzanar: Ralph P. Merritt as I Knew Him" (Pacific Citizen, 1966)
- "Touring in Japan" (Mission Studies: Woman's Work in Foreign Lands, Volumes 25-26, 1907)
