= Carmen Forest =

American handball player

Personal information
- Full name: Carmen Sue Forest
- Born: 21 April 1955 (age 70) Stillwater, Oklahoma, U.S.

Sport
- Sport: Handball

Carmen Sue Forest (born April 21, 1955, in Stillwater, Oklahoma) is an American former handball player who competed in the 1984 Summer Olympics.
