= Elizabeth Kellam de Forest =

American landscape architect (1898–1984)

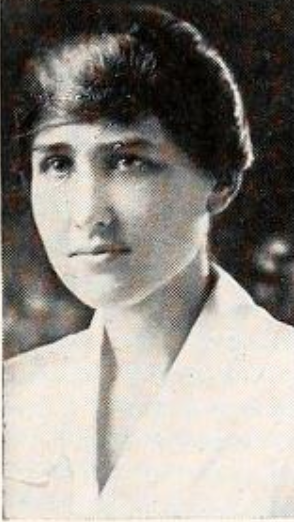
- Elizabeth Kellam, from the 1919 yearbook of Vassar College
- Born: Elizabeth Kellam; February 19, 1898; San Francisco, California, U.S.
- Died: March 4, 1984 (age 86)
- Occupation(s): Landscape architect and editor
- Relatives: Lockwood de Forest (father-in-law)

Elizabeth Kellam de Forest (February 19, 1898 – March 4, 1984) was an American landscape architect and editor, based in Santa Barbara, California.

== Early life and education ==
Kellam was born in San Francisco, the daughter of Frederick Benjamin Kellam and Edith Bishop Kellam. Her father was an insurance executive. She graduated from Vassar College in 1919, and earned a master's degree in psychology at Stanford University in 1920, with Lewis Terman as her thesis advisor. She was president of the Vassar Club of San Francisco in 1920, and she founded the Vassar Club of Santa Barbara.

== Career ==
Kellam taught in New York City as a young woman. Newly married, the de Forests moved to Santa Barbara in 1925, the year a major earthquake leveled much of the city. The couple were founding members of the Community Arts Association in Santa Barbara, shaping the distinctive architectural identity of the city. They were founders and editors of The Santa Barbara Gardener, from 1925 to 1942, and she took the lead on designing the entrance of the Santa Barbara Museum of Art after her husband's death in 1949. She earned her landscape architect's license in 1952, and completed several commissions in Montecito and Santa Barbara in her later years.

She was California's vice-regent of the Mount Vernon Ladies' Association, a trustee of the Santa Barbara Museum of Art, a board member of the Santa Barbara Botanic Garden, and a founder of the UCSB Friends of the Library. During World War II, she ran a canteen for servicemen in Santa Barbara.

== Publications ==
- Results of Intelligence Testing in the First Three Grades of the Palo Alto Schools (1921, master's thesis published as book)
- The Gardens and Grounds of Mount Vernon: How George Washington Planned and Planted Them (1982)

== Personal life ==
Kellam married landscape architect Lockwood de Forest III in 1925. They had two sons, Kellam (1926–2021) and Lockwood IV (born 1936). Her husband died in 1949, and she died in 1984, at the age of 86, in Santa Barbara. There is a large collection of the de Forests' papers at the University of California, Santa Barbara. Her older son became well-known in the Hollywood as a fact-checker consulting for television programs including Star Trek, Gunsmoke, and I Spy.
