= Pier Francesco Mola =

Italian painter (1612–1666)

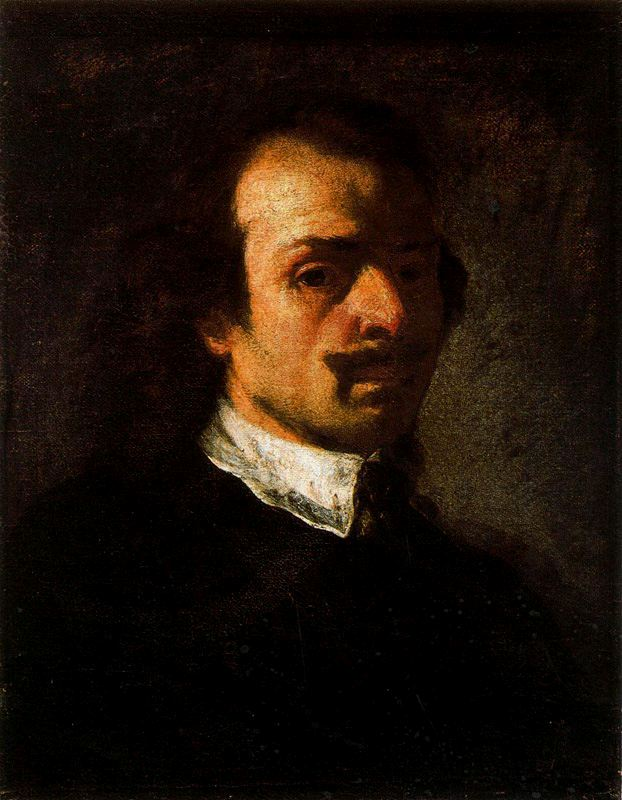
- Self-portrait, Uffizi, Florence
- Born: Pietro Francesco Mola; 9 February 1612; Ticino, now Switzerland
- Died: 13 May 1666 (aged 54); Rome, Papal States
- Known for: Painting
- Movement: Baroque

Pier Francesco Mola, called Il Ticinese (9 February 1612 – 13 May 1666) was a Swiss-Born Italian painter of the High Baroque, mainly active around Rome. His masterpiece as a fresco painter is widely considered to be the fresco in the gallery of Alexander VII in the Quirinal Palace Gallery, entitled Joseph making himself known to his Brethren (1657). However, Mola is considered to have been better as a painter of small pictures, especially landscapes. With his looser style and handling, more naturalistic palette, and interest in exploring landscape elements, Mola differs from the prevailing, highly-theoretical classicism of such leading 17th-century Roman painters as Andrea Sacchi.

== Biography ==
=== Early works and travels in northern Italy before 1647 ===
Mola was born in Coldrerio (now in Ticino, Switzerland). At the age of four, he moved to Rome with his father Giovanni Battista Mola, a painter. With the exception of the years 1633–1640 and 1641–1647, during which he resided in Venice and Bologna, respectively, he lived for the rest of his life in Rome.

His earliest recorded works are pen and chalk figure sketches that he added to several architectural drawings in a sketchbook by his father (New York, Metropolitan Museum of Art). Several sheets are dated 1631, including a sheet of ink and chalk studies entitled Standing Man, Flying Angels, and a Design for a Decorative Panel (fol. 45), which are entirely by him. These drawings show that, before any known contact with Venetian and Bolognese painting, apart from what he could see in Rome, he already displayed greater interest in chiaroscuro than in form. The pen and chalk strokes, in his typically fluid line, are buttressed with characteristic passages of parallel hatching in a mix of pen and chalk softened with wash.

From 1633 to 1640 and again from 1641 to 1647, Mola was in northern Italy, finishing his training and launching his career, but his movements are too poorly documented to allow any detailed account of his stylistic development. A signed and dated portrait drawing of his friend Pietro Testa (Montpellier, Musée Fabre) records his presence in Lucca in 1637. He was in Rome for Easter 1641 and by the summer of the same year had moved back to Coldrerio, where he frescoed the Cappella Nuova of the Oratory of the Madonna del Carmelo.

He may have been in Venice in 1644. Francesco Albani, in a letter of 1658, says that Mola studied with him in Bologna for two years, and Giovanni Battista Passeri, Mola’s biographer and personal acquaintance, wrote that Mola studied with Albani during his second visit to northern Italy. Perhaps the difficulties he had experienced with the Coldrerio frescoes encouraged him to seek out a master experienced in fresco, which would account for him joining Albani’s studio after 1642, rather than in 1633 when he first travelled north.

=== Public commissions and mature works in Rome, 1647–1657 ===
In 1647 Mola established himself in Rome, his style by this time reflecting his deep knowledge of the work of Titian, the Bassano family, Guercino and Albani, artists he had particularly admired in northern Italy. The commissions he received in Rome for frescoes and altarpieces demanded the creation of a grander style, and his first documented work there, the Image of St. Dominic Carried to Soriano by the Virgin, St. Catherine and St. Mary Magdalene (Rome, Santi Domenico e Sisto), was a deliberate attempt to fuse key elements of Roman 17th-century painting and northern Italian art of the 16th and 17th centuries, a programme that he pursued for the remainder of his career. A pen, ink, and wash compositional study (Haarlem, Teylers Museum) shows the direct impact of Albani’s style, but the monumentality of the figures and the rich, dark colours reveal a different artistic temperament and are deeply indebted to Guercino. The wine red, dark green, deep blue, and chocolate brown accented with white are a palette reminiscent of Titian and the Bassano family, yet with the addition of the complex violet greys of Guercino. The realism of some passages, such as the monk’s veined hands and hollow cheeks, reveals a straightforward naturalism more typical of northern Italy than of Rome.

As a fresco painter, Mola was still tentative and uncertain, as is demonstrated by the ceiling fresco Bacchus and Ariadne (c. 1650; Rome, Palazzo Costaguti). Later in the 1650s, his Roman fresco commissions reveal his growing admiration for the most monumental works of the Roman High Renaissance by Raphael and Michelangelo. This development is apparent in St. Peter Baptizing in Prison and the Conversion of St. Paul (Rome, Church of the Gesù, Ravenna Chapel), yet these works were less assured in their treatment of space than the large Joseph Greeting his Brethren (1656–57; Rome, Quirinal Palace) and should be dated earlier than it, perhaps to 1649 when Francesco Ravenna, the patron who commissioned them, became a consul of the city. The Quirinal fresco, Mola’s most important Roman commission, fills one end of Alexander VII’s gallery, and 10 drawings (examples, London, British Museum; Düsseldorf, Kunstmuseum) attest to the care with which he prepared it. The staging of the drama, with Joseph standing on the left, arms outstretched to greet his 12 brothers (several of whom have dropped to their knees to express their chagrin and astonishment), recalls that of Raphael’s tapestry cartoon Christ’s Charge to St. Peter (London, Victoria and Albert Museum). The grouping is less planar than Raphael’s, however, and the eye is led back in stages through majestic architecture to a typically lush landscape. The main figures have the heroic proportions of Michelangelo’s Sistine Chapel ignudi, while the cleverly arranged cloak of Joseph, framing his arms and giving bulk to his slight proportions, shows that Mola understood Bernini’s use of similar devices to impart drama to his figure sculpture.

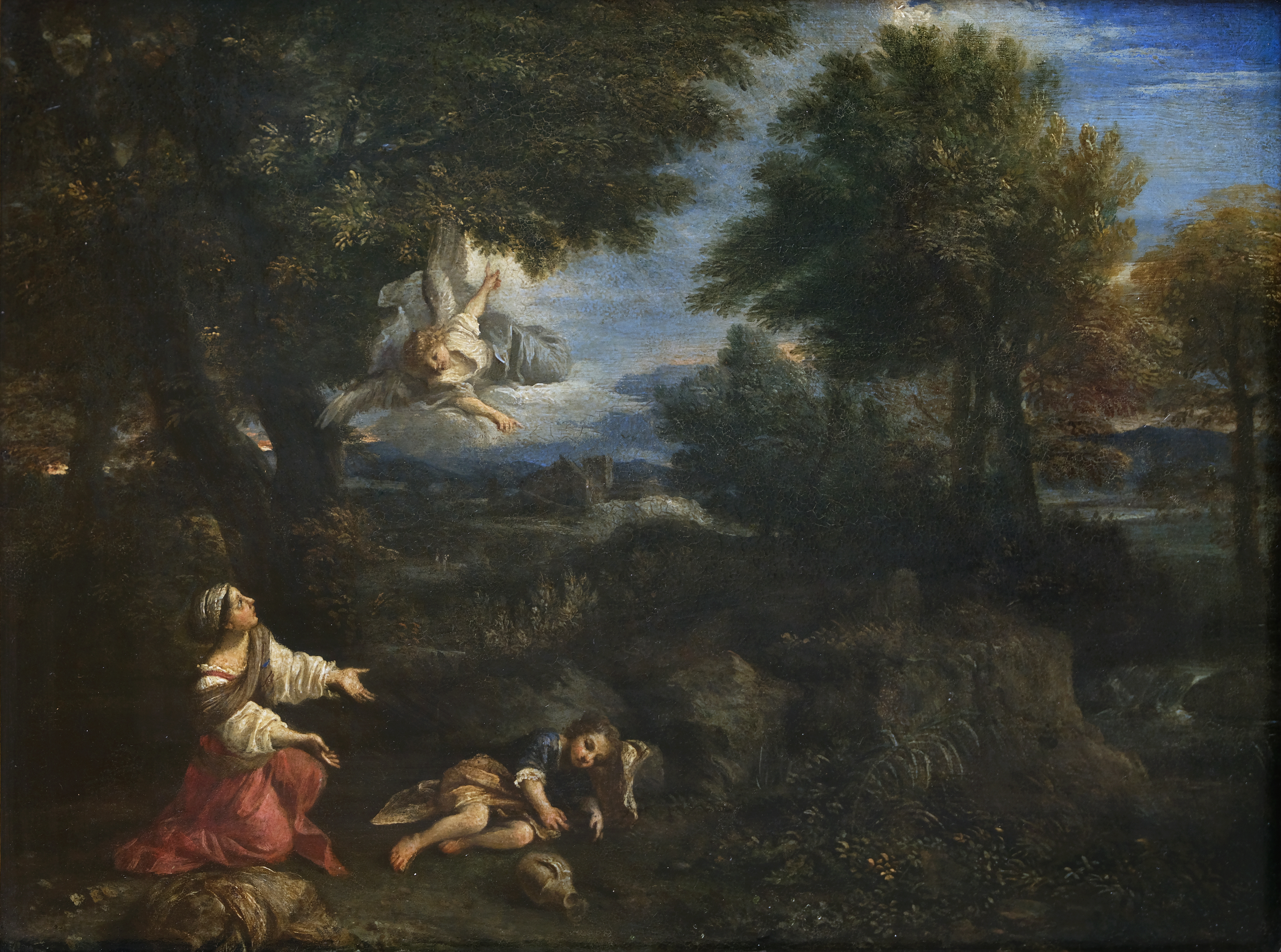
Landscape with Hagar and the Angel, Paris, Louvre

Mola’s private commissions of this period gradually attained a new Roman grandeur. The splendid Barbary Pirate, his only signed and dated picture (1650; Paris, Louvre), is a romantic, three-quarter-length figure in exotic eastern dress. The works, whose presence in Roman private collections formed during his lifetime suggests a date in the Roman period (e.g., the Expulsion of Hagar and Ishmael and Rebecca and Eliezer, both Rome, Galleria Colonna; Bacchus, Rome, Galleria Spada; and the Dream of Endymion, Rome, Palazzo dei Conservatori, Braccio Nuovo), are large canvases in which the figures dominate. A group of cabinet pictures, with figures between the small scale of the early works (1632–1646) and the heroic scale of his later paintings, may belong to a transitional phase, as Mola adjusted the scale of his private commissions to the grandeur of his public style. These evocative and poetic works include the Mercury and Argus (Oberlin, Ohio, Allen Memorial Art Museum), Erminia Guarding Her Flocks and its pendant, the lyrical Erminia and Vafrino Tending the Wounded Tancred (early 1650s; Paris, Louvre).

=== Late works, 1658 and after ===
In 1658 Mola prepared and began a fresco of mythological scenes for the ceiling of the Stanza dell’Aria in Prince Camillo Pamphili’s summer palace at Valentino. A number of surviving drawings (e.g. Kupferstichkabinett Berlin; Chatsworth, Derbys; Florence, Uffizi; Madrid, Real Academia de Bellas Artes de San Fernando) record his ambitious and attractive scheme. Unfortunately, he became involved in a dispute with the Pamphili that resulted in a lengthy lawsuit (1659–64), and his partially finished work was destroyed and replaced with one by Mattia Preti in 1661.

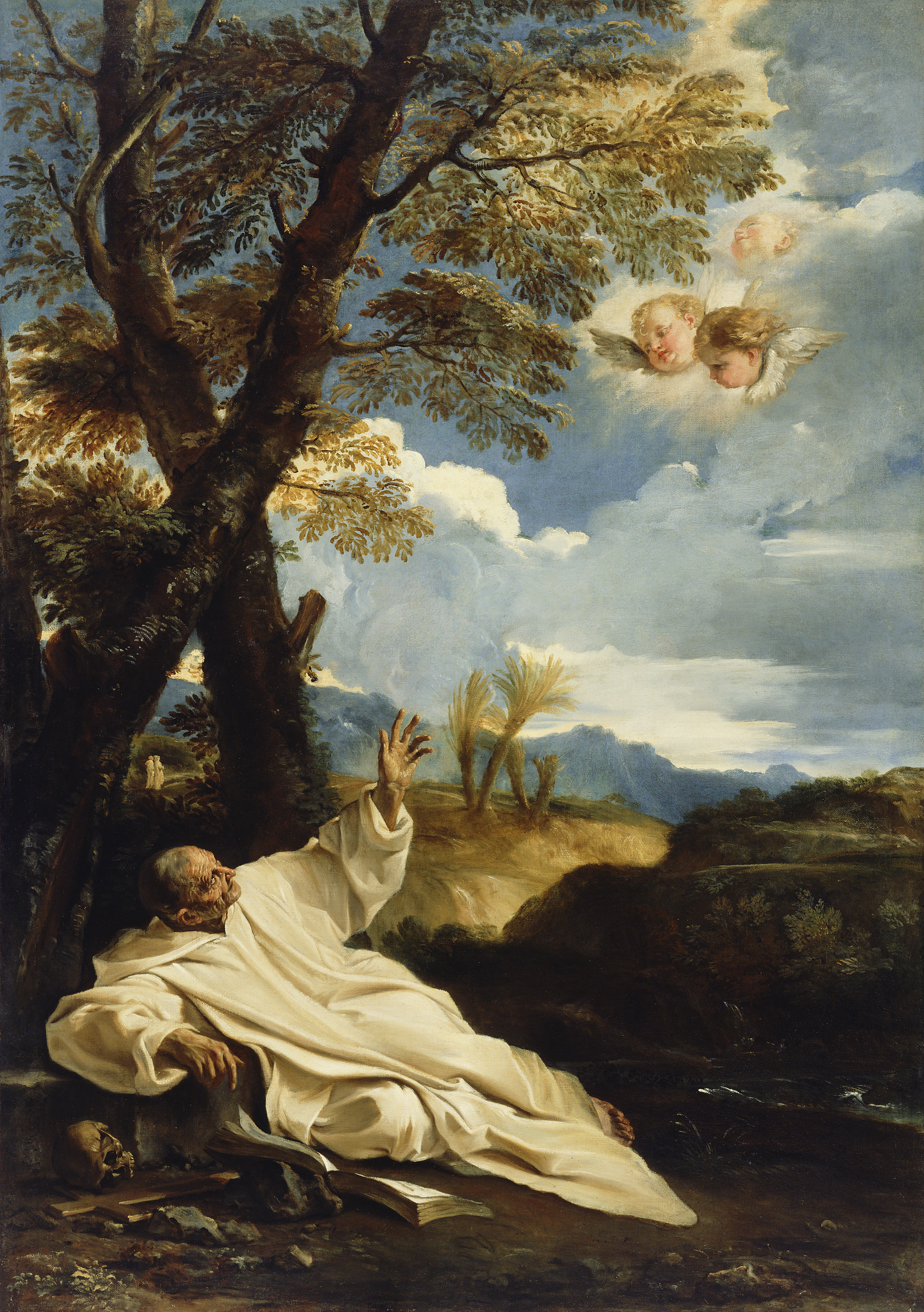
The vision of St. Bruno, Malibu, J. Paul Getty Museum

Despite this setback, he continued to attract important patrons, among them Pope Alexander VII and the Colonna family. Pascoli records his contacts with Christina, Queen of Sweden, and two pictures, the Death of Archimedes (Rome, priv. col.), one of a group of pictures of philosophers, and the Head of Medusa, were in her collection. Mola’s late works, such as the impressive Vision of St. Bruno (1662–63; Malibu, J. Paul Getty Museum) painted for Prince Agostino Chigi, nephew of Alexander VII, became increasingly dramatic and powerful. Mola explored this subject first in a series of exceptionally beautiful drawings (Hessisches Landesmuseum Darmstadt; Saint Petersburg, Hermitage; Frankfurt, Städel) and in the painting produced his finest resolution of Venetian colouring and Roman grandeur. The saint, reclining in the lower left corner in a flowing white robe, looks up and gestures towards two cherubim who hover in the upper right against a brilliant sky. The saint is shaded by two trees, their crossed trunks and their branches reaching up beyond the top of the canvas. A panoramic landscape fills the right side of the picture. The composition is indebted to Andrea Sacchi’s Vision of St. Romuald (1631; Rome, Pincoteca Vaticana); the strong tonal contrasts of the landscape are reminiscent of Guercino, while the mountain ranges and azure blue tones suggest the influence of Titian.

In his drawings, for example, Erminia and Vafrino Tending the Wounded Tancred (Düsseldorf Kunstmuseum), his use of curved pen lines enlivened with patches of brown ink wash suggests Guercino’s style, but Mola usually mixed pen and chalk, especially red chalk, to achieve a variety of tonal effects. Mola became principal of the Accademia di San Luca, Rome, in 1662 but resigned a year later owing to ill health. Passeri confirms that his health was affected by the lawsuit with the Pamphili and says that studio assistants worked on some of his later commissions.

Several of Mola’s caricatures suggest a melancholy discontent; in a drawing inscribed ‘Adio speranze’ (London, BM), an artist sits brooding beside his palette and brushes, which lie scattered on the ground. An upturned cornucopia, a symbol of abundance, pours forth onions. Mola died on 13 May 1666 in Rome, aged 54. Among his pupils were Jean-Baptiste Forest, Antonio Gherardi, and Giuseppe Bonati.

== Gallery ==
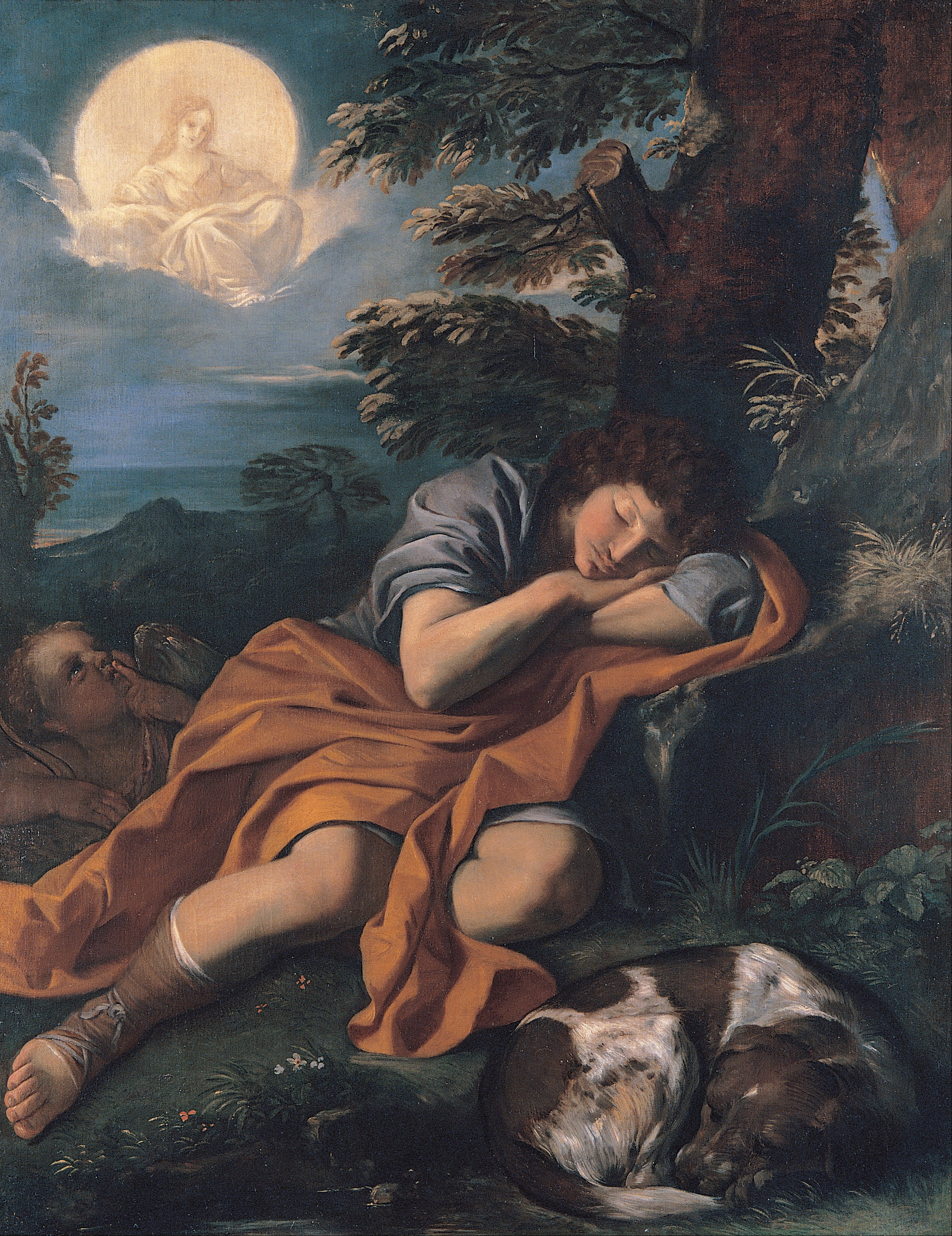
Diane and Endymion, Capitoline Museums, Rome

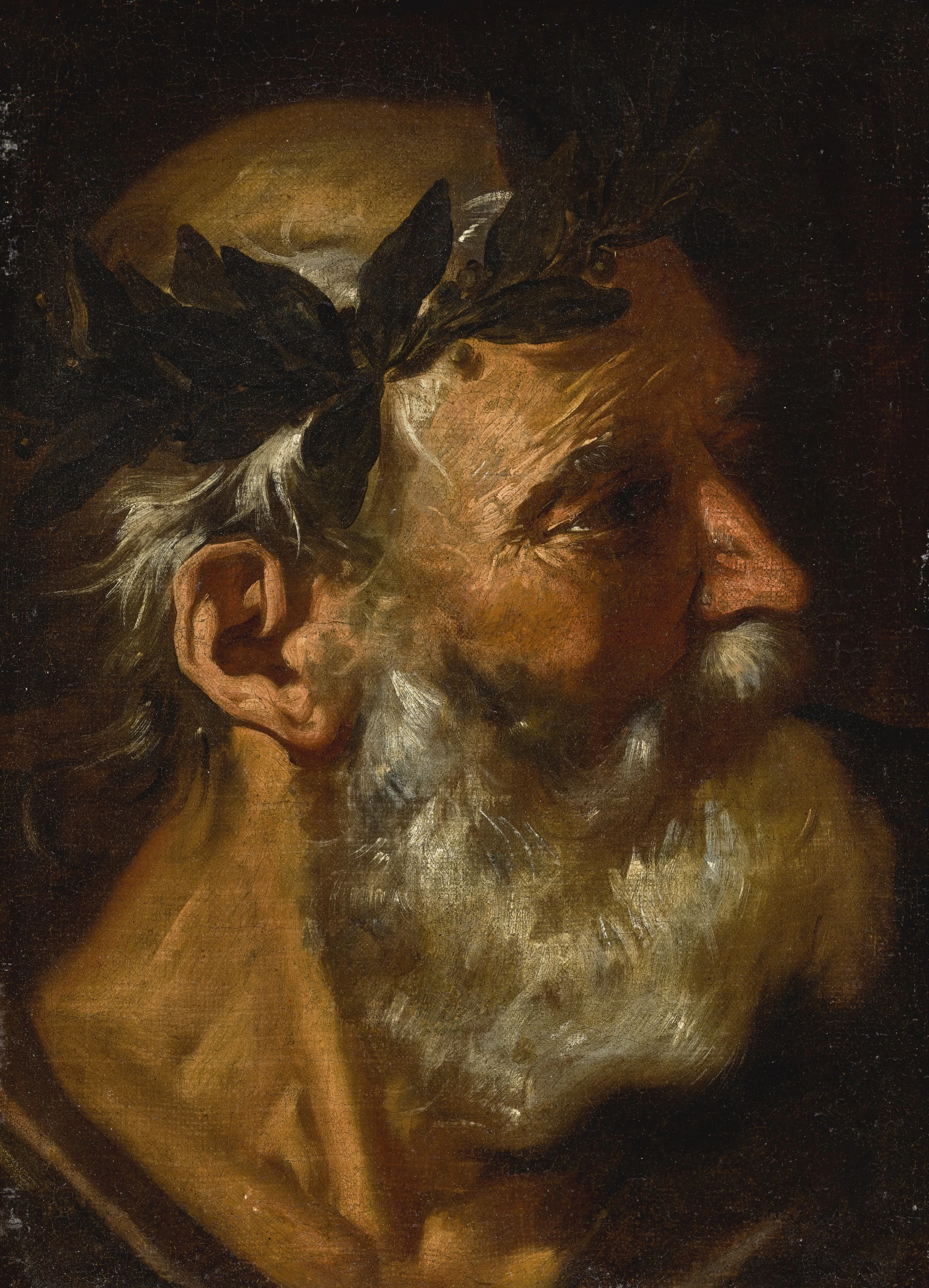
Head of an elderly bearded man, priv. col.

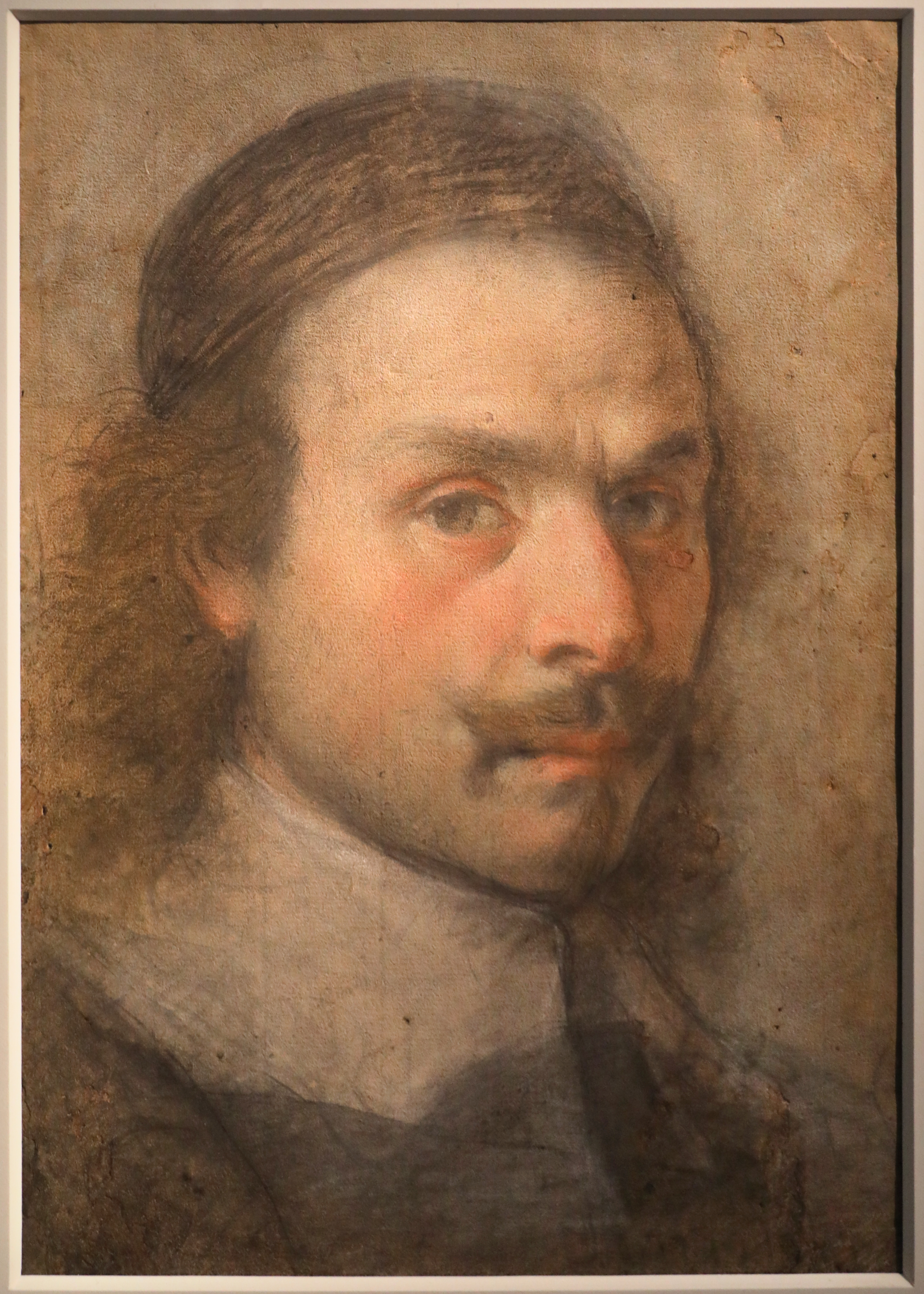
Self portrait, Gabinetto dei Disegni e delle Stampe, Uffizi

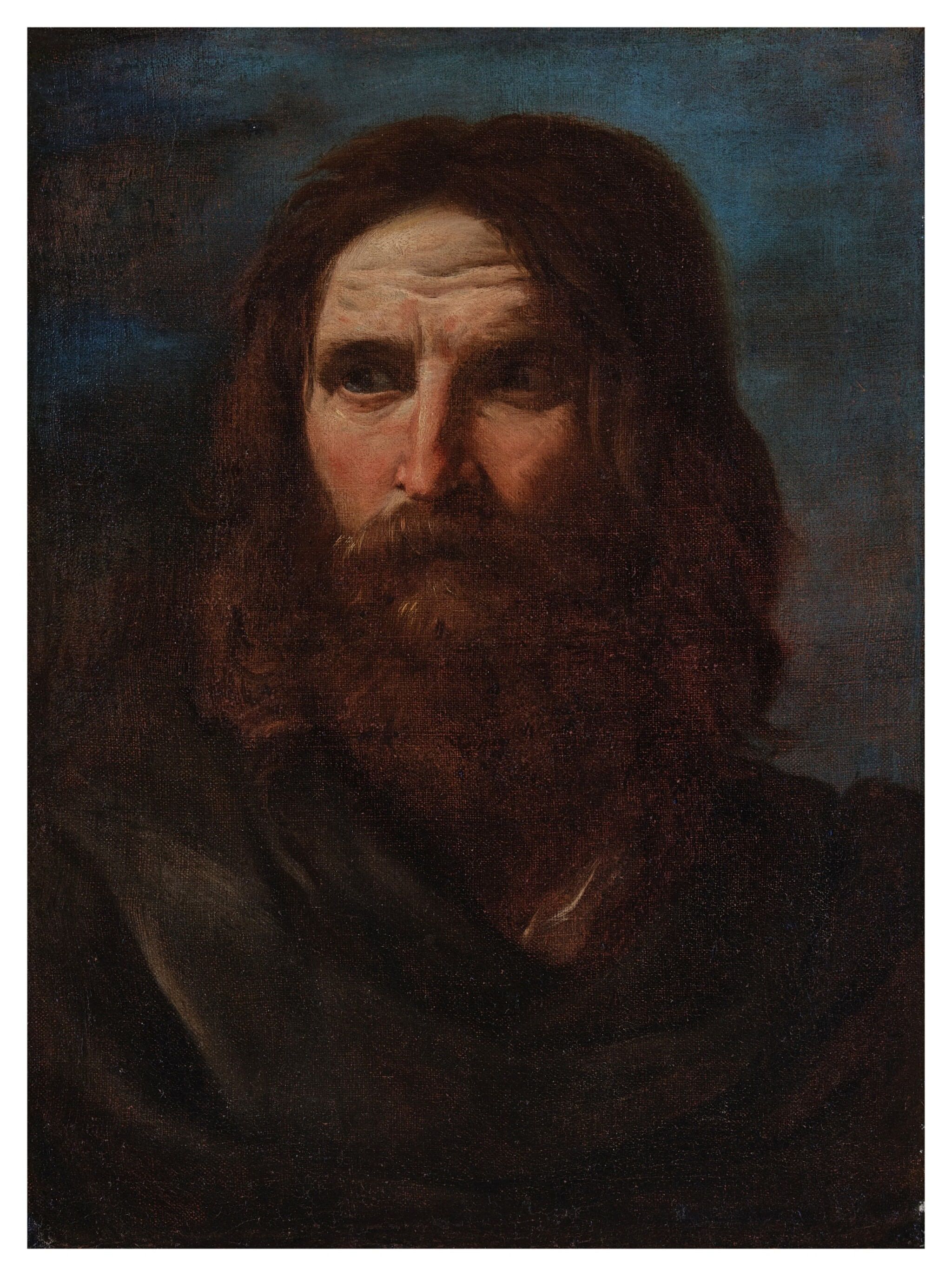
Portrait of a Bearded Man, priv. col.

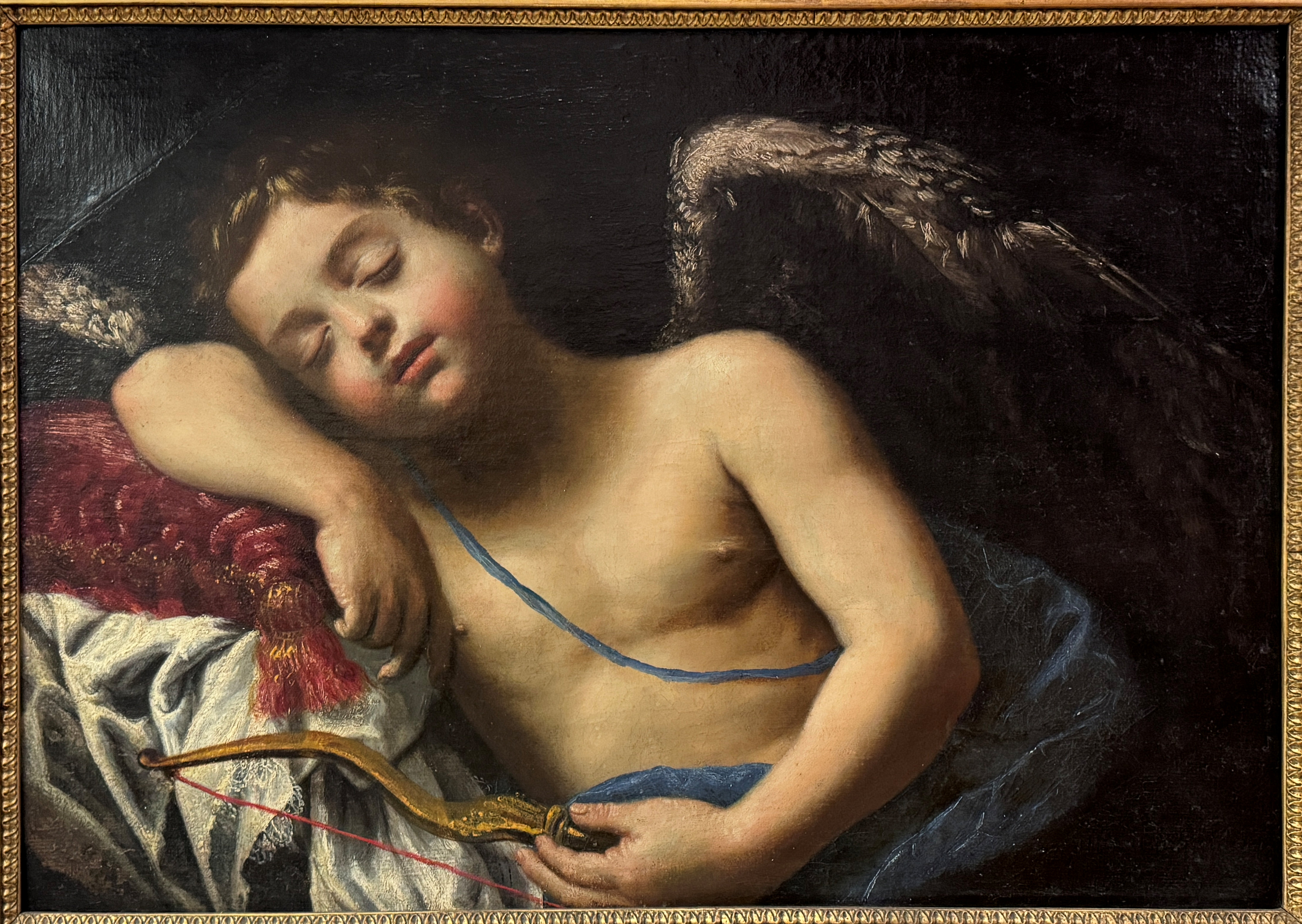
Sleeping Cupid, Landesmuseum Mainz

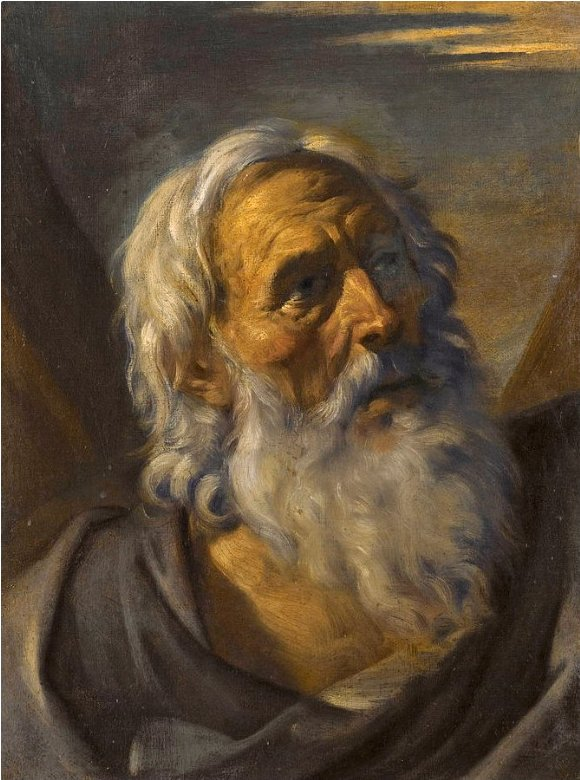
St. Andrew, priv. col.

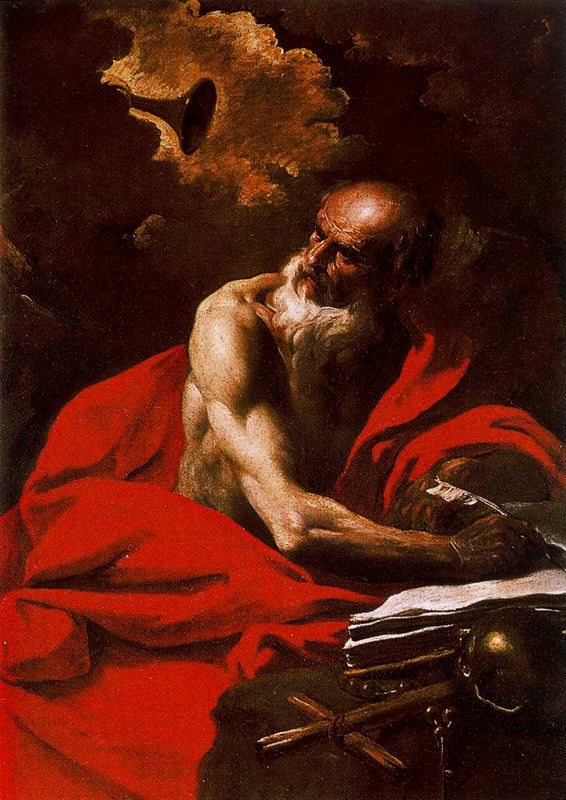
St. Jerome, Pinacoteca Vaticana, Rome

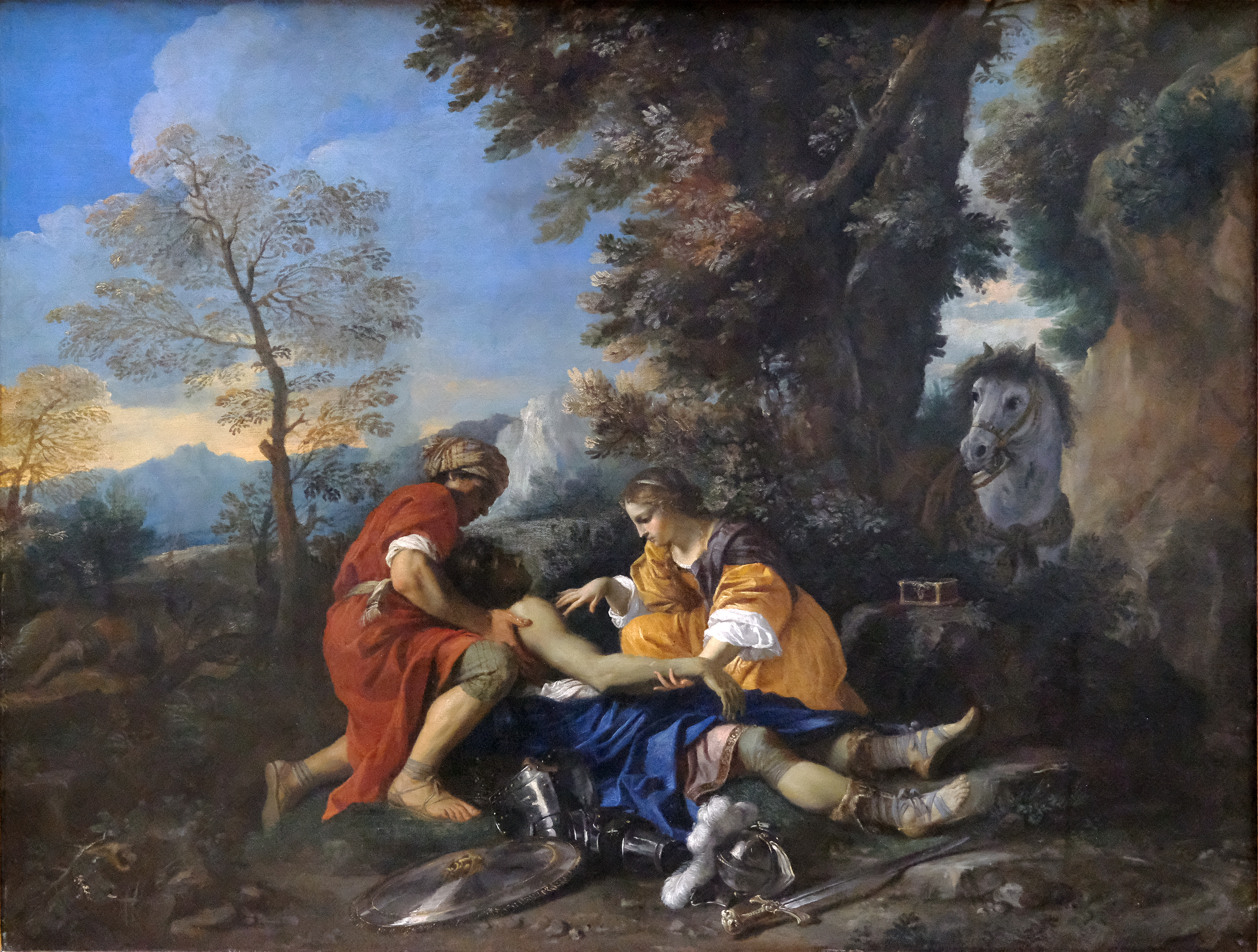
Erminia and Valfrino Tending the Wounded Tancred After the Battle with Argante, Louvre, Paris

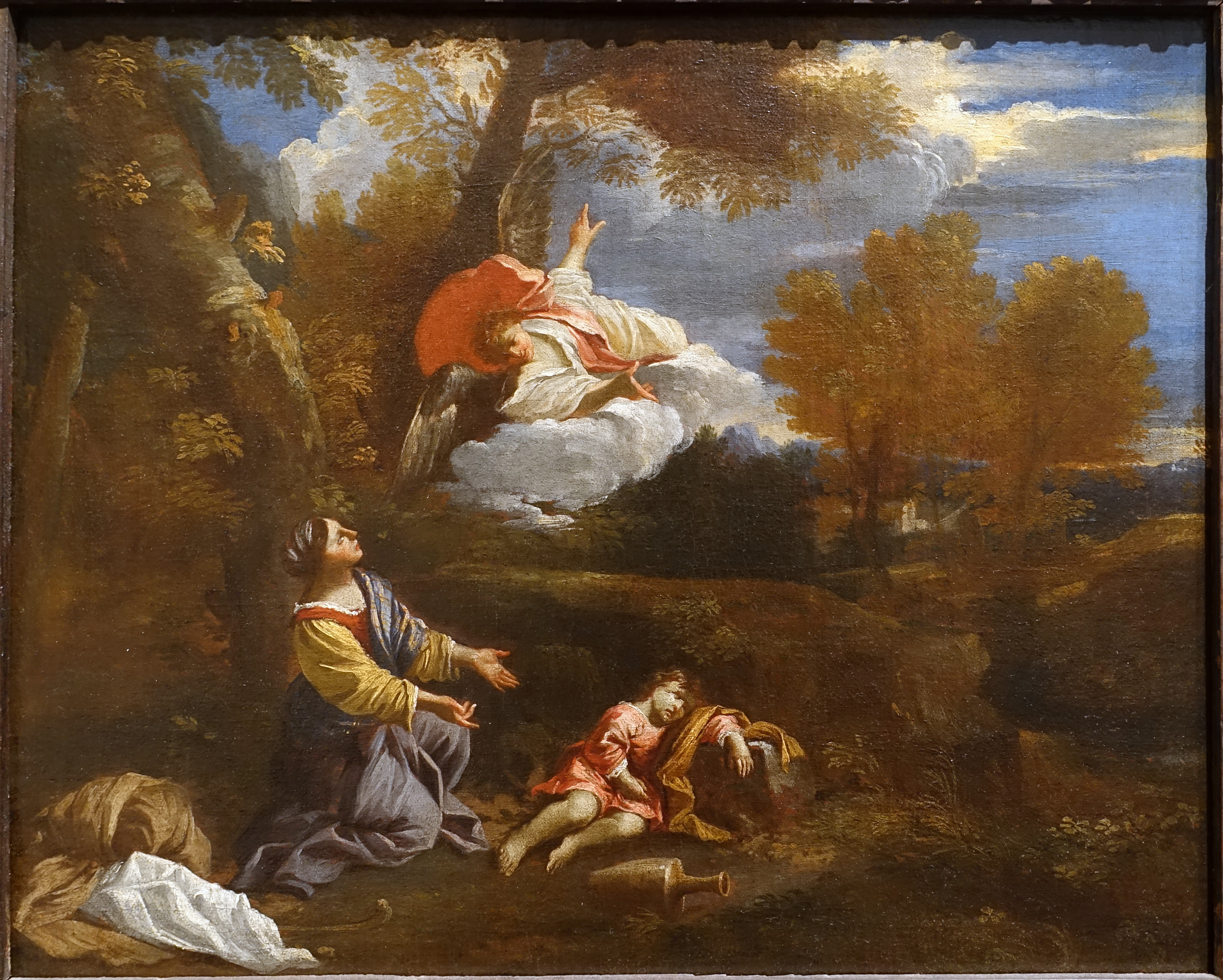
Hagar and Ishmael in the Wilderness, Blanton Museum of Art, Austin, Texas

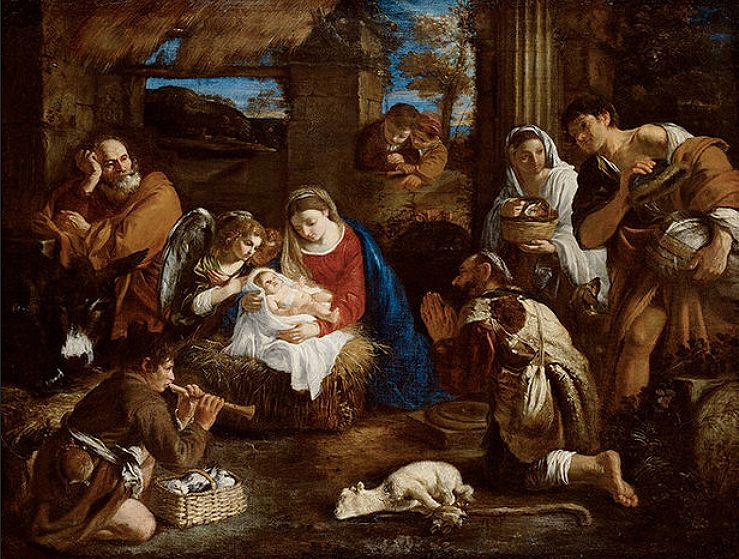
Adoration of the Shepherds, Musée des Beaux-Arts de Nîmes

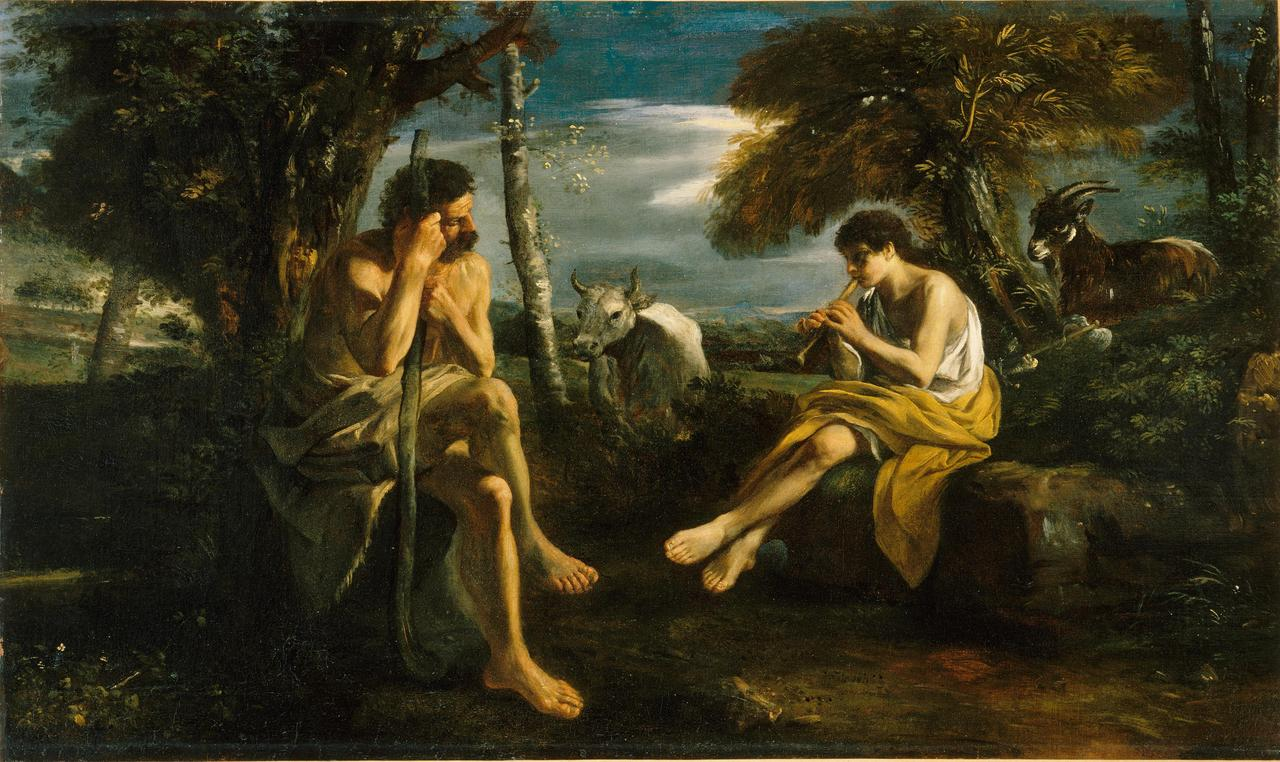
Mercurius and Argos, Oberlin, Ohio, Allen Memorial Art Museum

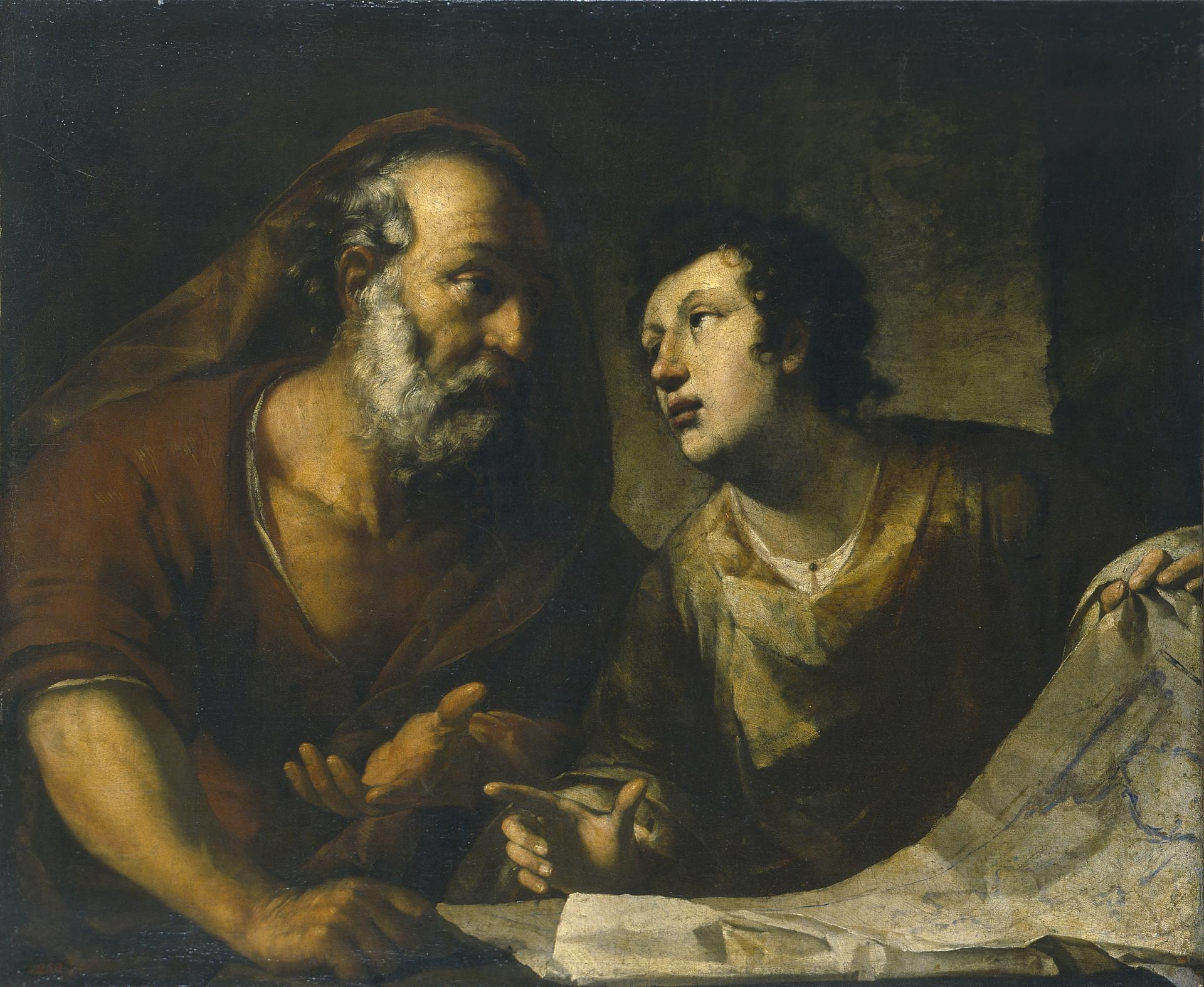
The Geographer, Hermitage Museum, Saint Petersburg

== Sources ==
- Passeri, Giovanni Battista (1934). J. Hess (ed.). Vite de' pittori, scultori ed architetti che hanno lavorato in Roma, morti dal 1641 al 1765. Leipzig and Vienna. pp. 367–72.
- Manuela Kahn-Rossi, ed. (1989). Pier Francesco Mola 1612-1666. Milan: Electa. ISBN 978-8843529858.
- Carr, Dawson W. (1991). "Ecstasy in the Wilderness: Pier Francesco Mola's "The Vision of Saint Bruno"". The J. Paul Getty Museum Journal. 19: 99–126. JSTOR 4166614.
- Freedberg, Sydney J. (1993). Painting in Italy, 1500-1600. Pelican History of Art. pp. 323–325 Penguin Books Ltd.
