= Julie Morrow Deforest =

American painter

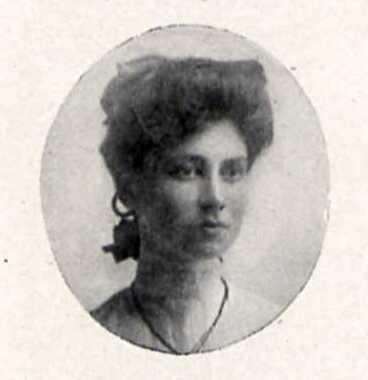
- Born: April 30, 1882; New York City
- Died: December 22, 1979 (aged 97); Glendale
- Alma mater: Wellesley College; Columbia University
- Occupation: Painter
- Spouse(s): Cornelius Wortendyke DeForest
- Parent(s): Cornelius Wortendyke Morrow

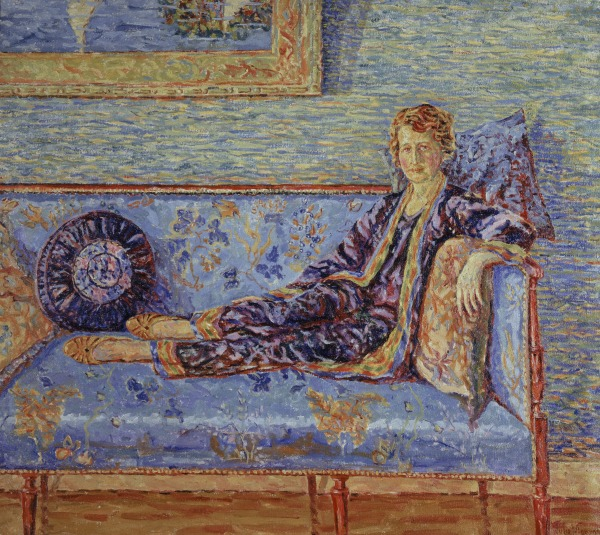
Golden Mules, a self-portrait by Julie Morrow Deforest, Cincinnati Art Museum

Julie Mathilde Morrow Deforest (April 30, 1882 – December 22, 1979) was an American impressionist painter.

Julie Morrow Deforest was born on April 30, 1882 in New York City, the daughter of Rev. Cornelius Wortendyke Morrow and Rosalie Lippmann Morrow. She earned a bachelor's degree in English from Wellesley College in 1904 and a master's degree in literature from Columbia University in 1906. She studied art under Jonas Lie, Charles Webster Hawthorne, and John F. Carlson.

For twenty years, she taught English at Irving High School and Wadleigh High School at New York City while painting and exhibiting in her free time. In 1929, she married Cornelius Wortendyke DeForest, her newly divorced first cousin and a wealthy utility executive in Cincinnati, Ohio. She relocated to Cincinnati and was able to devote herself to painting full time.

Her work focused on brightly colored impressionist landscapes. After visits to California and Colorado, she began to focus on areas of the Western US in her work of the 1930s, including the Rocky Mountains.

At the age of 92, she published a book of poetry, Belfry Chimes and Other Rimes (1974).

Julie Morrow Deforest died on 22 December 1979 in Glendale, Ohio.
