= Forrest S. Mosten =

American lawyer

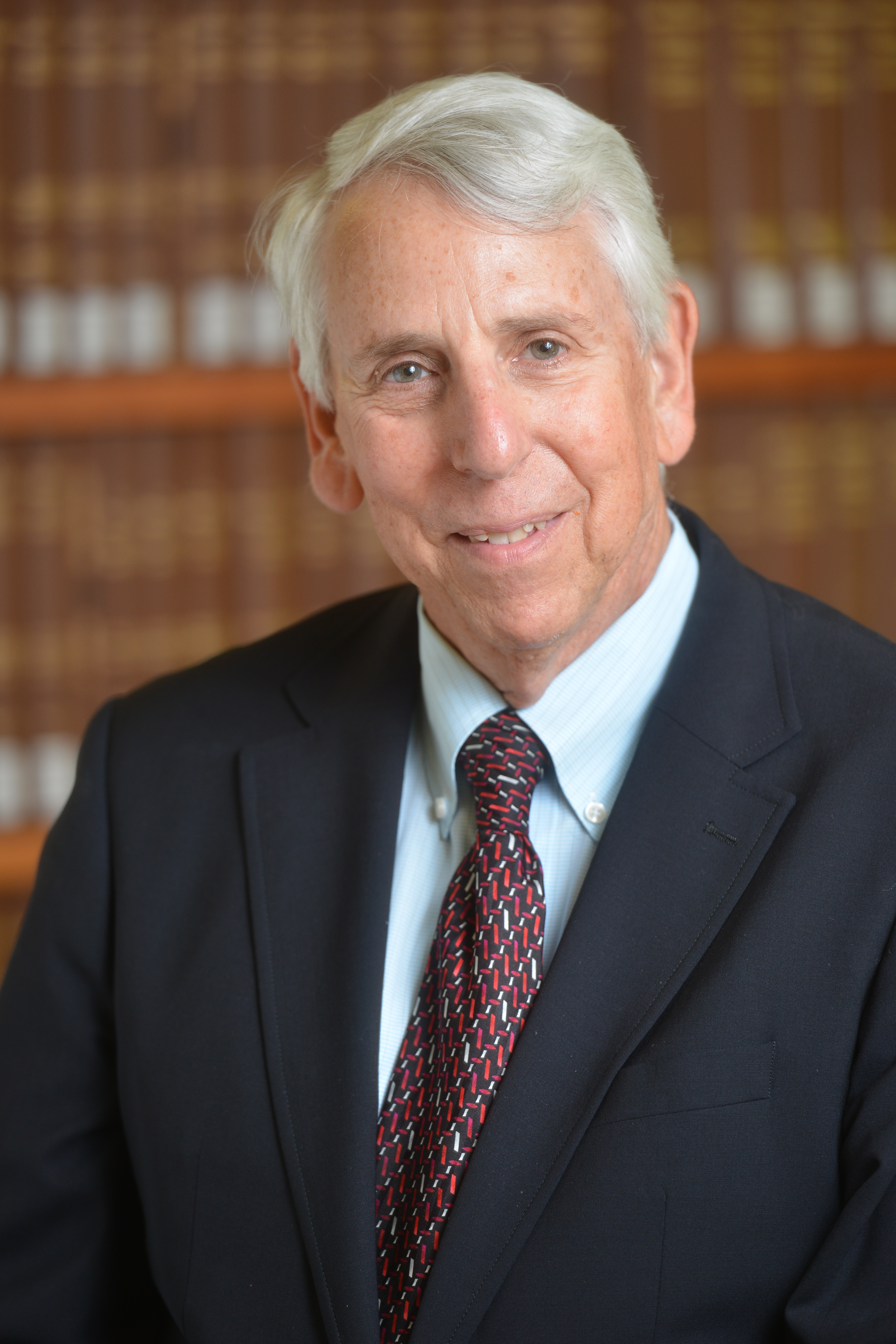
- Born: Forrest Steven Mosten; April 18, 1947 (age 79); Detroit, Michigan, U.S.
- Education: University of California, Riverside (AB); UCLA School of Law (JD)
- Occupations: mediator, lawyer, trainer, author
- Years active: 1972–present

Forrest "Woody" Steven Mosten (born April 18, 1947 in Detroit, Michigan) is an American lawyer and author. Mosten has been practicing law in Los Angeles since 1972, additionally serves clients in San Diego and Orange County, and accepts mediation engagement throughout the world online. A former litigator, he is a full-time peacemaker and never takes a case to court, often working in an interdisciplinary team with a triage approach. Mosten has spoken at conferences and trains lawyers and litigators, and taught as an adjunct professor at the UCLA School of Law, from 2002 to 2022.

== Early life and education ==
Mosten grew up in Los Angeles, where he attended Alexander Hamilton High School.

Mosten attended the University of California, Riverside, graduating in 1969. He graduated with a Juris Doctor degree in 1972 from the UCLA School of Law, University of California. He has continually trained and studied with leading scholars as both a mediator and a lawyer.

== Career ==
Mosten began his legal career in 1972 as a founding partner of Jacoby and Meyers. He left that practice in 1976 to serve as assistant professor of law and director of clinical education at the Mercer University School of Law in Macon, Georgia, and in 1978 served as assistant regional director for consumer protection at the Federal Trade Commission. He opened a private law and mediation practice in 1979 with a storefront office near the Los Angeles International Airport.

Mosten has since focused exclusively on peace-making. Instead of going to court, he relies on mediation strategies, unbundled legal services, principles of collaborative law, and preventive legal wellness focused on client-centered decision making in order to resolve disputes.

Mosten is the creator of Unbundled legal services, which he developed in order to expand legal access to the underserved who otherwise represent themselves.

Mosten has been an innovator in the creation of the client library as an educational resource for informed consent, of Confidential Mini-Evaluation, and in training family law professionals to be financially self-sufficient in their peacemaking practices.

Mosten is a founding member of the Southern California Mediation Association and was named by the SCMA as Peacemaker of the Year (1999) and is the recipient of the 2017 SCMA President’s Award. In 2020, the SCMA established the Forrest S. Mosten Star Award for Excellence and Innovation in Mediation and awarded him the Inaugural Award.

Mosten has taught at the UCLA School of Law (2002–2022), where he was an adjunct professor of law teaching mediation, family law practice, a non-litigation approach, lawyer as peacemaker, lawyer-client relationship. He has presented at mediation and law conferences throughout the world.

In 2020, Mosten was appointed chair of the Mediate.com Online Mediation Training Taskforce.

== Personal life ==
Mosten lives with his wife, Jody, a retired clinical psychologist, near the University of California San Diego.

== Books ==
- Building A Successful Collaborative Family Law Practice (with Adam B. Cordover) (2018) published by American Bar Association, ISBN 978-1-64105-241-2
- Unbundled Legal Services: A Family Lawyer's Guide (with Elizabeth Potter Scully) (2017) published by American Bar Association, ISBN 9781634259217
- The Complete Guide to Mediation (with Elizabeth Potter Scully) (2nd Edition, 2015) published by American Bar Association. ISBN 978-1634250108
- Collaborative Divorce Handbook (2009) published by Jossey-Bass. ISBN 978-0470395196
- The Complete Guide to Mediation: The Cutting-Edge Approach to Family Law Practice. ABA Book Publishing (2003).
- Mediation Career Guide (2001) published by Jossey-Bass. ISBN 978-0787957032
- Unbundling Legal Services (2000) published by American Bar Association. ISBN 978-1570738463

== Awards and honors ==
- 2020 Southern California Mediation Association, Inaugural Recipient of SCMA Star Award for Excellence and Innovation of Family Mediation
- 2019 Academy of Professional Family Mediators, Lifetime Career Achievement Award
- 2017 Southern California Mediation Association, President's Award
- 2015 New York Council of Divorce Mediators, Lifetime Career Achievement Award
- 2015 Allegheny Bar Association, Recipient of Judge Lawrence Kaplan Award for Mediation
- 2004 American Bar Association Standing Committee for Delivery of Legal Services Lifetime Legal Access Award.
- 2004 American Bar Association Lawyer Section on Dispute Resolution Problem Solver Award.
- 1997 American Bar Association, Meritorious Recognition, Legal Access Award
- 1996 Los Angeles County Bar Association Conflict Prevention Award
- 1996 Beverly Hills Bar Special Service Award for Contributions in Mediation
- 1999 Peacemaker of the Year, Southern California Mediation Association
- In 1984, Mosten was named Chair of the ABA Client Counseling Competition. Since 1989, he has been Executive Chair of the Brown Mosten International Client Consultation Competition, a law school competition involving 22 countries that now bears his name along with his mentor, Louis M. Brown.
