= Jean-Baptiste Forest =

French painter

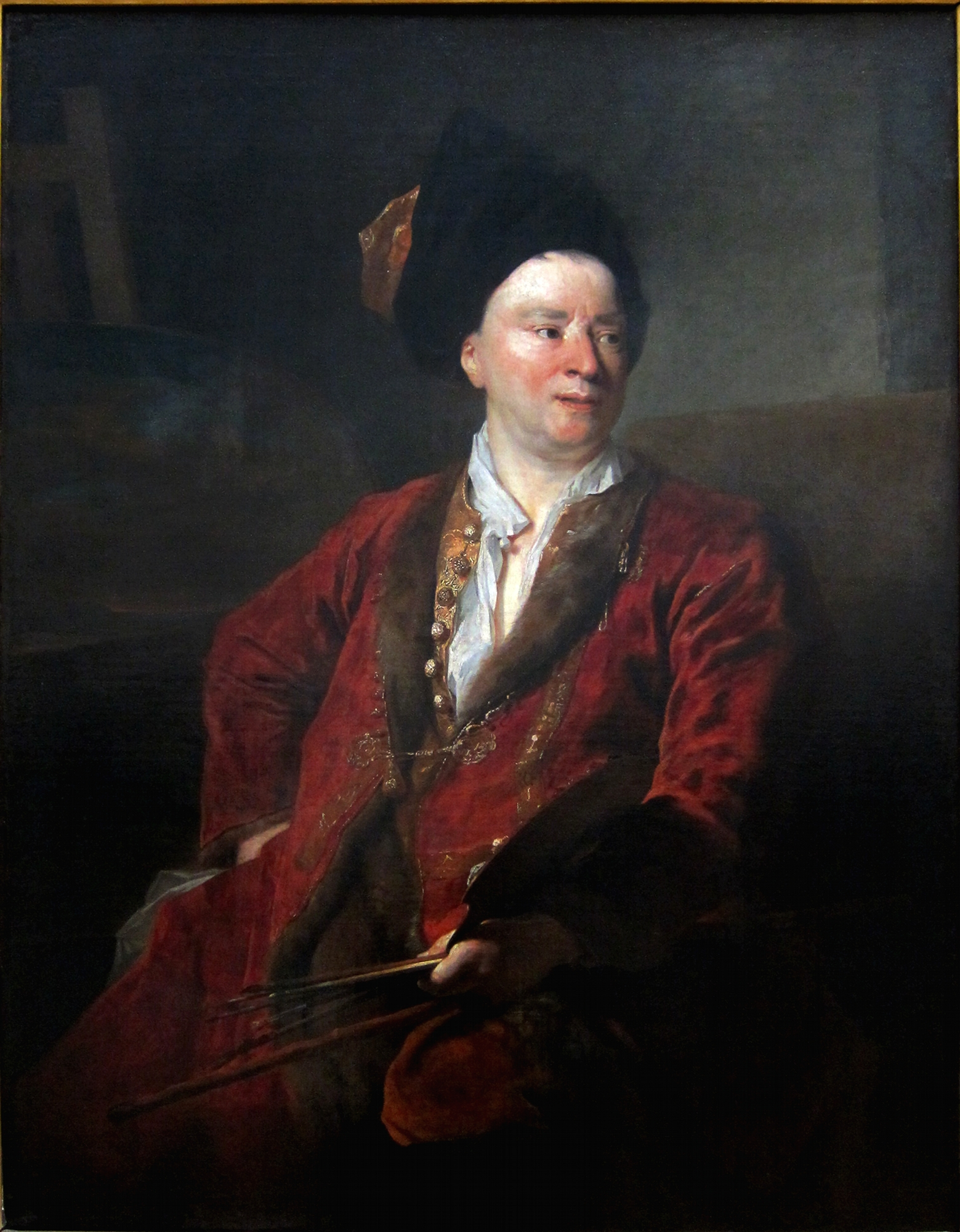
Nicolas de Largillière, Portrait of Forest (1704), Palais des Beaux-Arts de Lille.

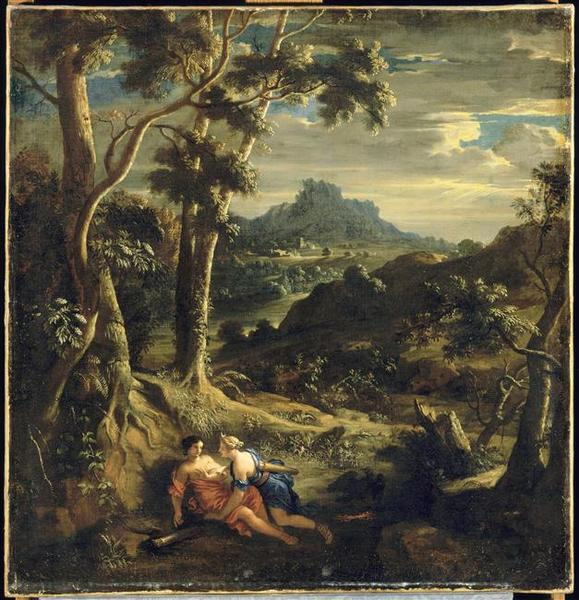
Attributed to Jean-Baptiste Forest, Jupiter and Callisto, Dijon, Musée Magnin.

Jean-Baptiste Forest (1636 in Paris – 1712 in Paris) was a French landscape painter.

== Biography ==
He was instructed in the first rudiments of art by his father, Pierre Forest, an artist little known. He went afterwards to Italy, and at Rome became the scholar of Pietro Francesco Mola. After studying the works of that master for some time, he applied himself to an imitation of the grand landscapes of Titian and Giorgione. On his return to France he was esteemed one of the ablest landscape painters of his country, and was received into the Academy in Paris in 1674. From an unfortunate process he made use of in the preparation of his colors, some of his pictures have since become dark.

He was related to Luigi De La Forest (1668 or 1685 -1738), Parisian painter, who was active in Modena.
