= DeForest =

DeForest or De Forrest may refer to:

- DeForest (name), including a list of people with the name
- DeForest Training School or DeVry University, a private, for-profit university system in the US
- Lake DeForest, a reservoir in Clarkstown, New York
- DeForest, Wisconsin, a village in Dane County, Wisconsin, US
  - DeForest High School, Wisconsin
- De Forest (crater), an impact crater on the far side of the Moon
