= Forest Loudin =

American football, basketball, and baseball coach

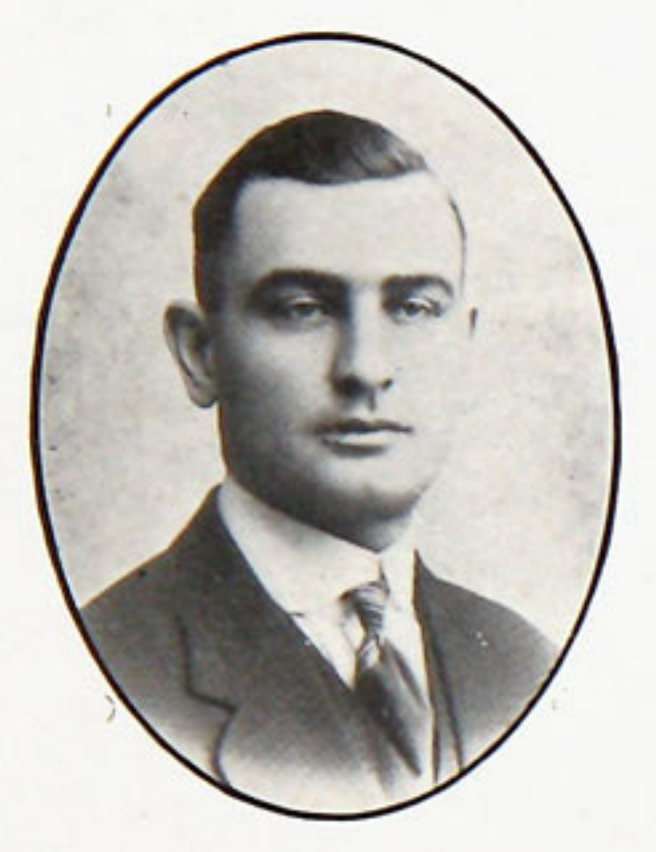
- Loudin pictured in the Crimson Rambler 1922, Carthage, yearbook

Biographical details
- Born: February 26, 1890; New London Mills, Illinois, U.S.
- Died: September 15, 1935 (aged 45); Keokuk, Iowa, U.S.

Coaching career (HC unless noted)

Football
- 1916–1920: Carthage

Basketball
- 1914–1918: Carthage
- 1919–1921: Carthage

Baseball
- 1916–1921: Carthage

Head coaching record
- Overall: 8–13–2 (football); 24–37 (basketball); 7–12 (baseball)

Forrest Allen Loudin (February 26, 1890 – September 15, 1935) was an American football, basketball, and baseball coach. He was an alumnus of the University of Iowa, where he played football. Previously he had also coached and taught science and athletics high school in Iowa.

Loudin was the head football coach at Carthage College in Carthage, Illinois for four seasons, from 1916 until 1920, compiling a record of 8–13–2.

Loudin was also professor of Mathematics and Physical Director at his time at Carthage. He died at Keokuk, Iowa in 1935 of an illness contracted during his overseas service in World War I.
