= DeForest Stull =

American sports coach and professor (1885–1938)

Biographical details
- Born: April 21, 1885; Richmond, Michigan, U.S.
- Died: December 10, 1938 (aged 53); New York, New York, U.S.

Playing career

Football
- 1901–1903: Coe

Coaching career (HC unless noted)

Football
- 1912: Northern State Normal

Basketball
- 1910–1915: Northern State Normal

Head coaching record
- Overall: 0–1 (football); 15–11 (basketball)

DeForest Stull (April 21, 1885 – December 10, 1938) was an American and geography professor and college football and college basketball coach. He served as the football coach at Northern State Normal—now known as Northern Michigan University—for one season, in 1912. Stull was also the head basketball coach at Northern State Normal from 1910 to 1915.

Stull was born in Richmond, Michigan, where he attended school. He earned degrees from Coe College in Cedar Rapids, Iowa, the University of Chicago, and Teachers College, Columbia University. He taught at Northern State Normal for 14 years before moving to Teachers College after 1922. Stull died on December 10, 1938, at Medical Center in Manhattan, from double pneumonia following an operation three days prior.

== Head coaching record ==
=== Football ===
Year	Team	Overall	Conference	Standing	Bowl/playoffs
Northern State Normal (Independent) (1912)
1912	Northern State Normal	0–1			
Northern State Normal:		0–1			
Total:		0–1			
