= Giuseppe Bonati =

Italian painter (1635–1681)

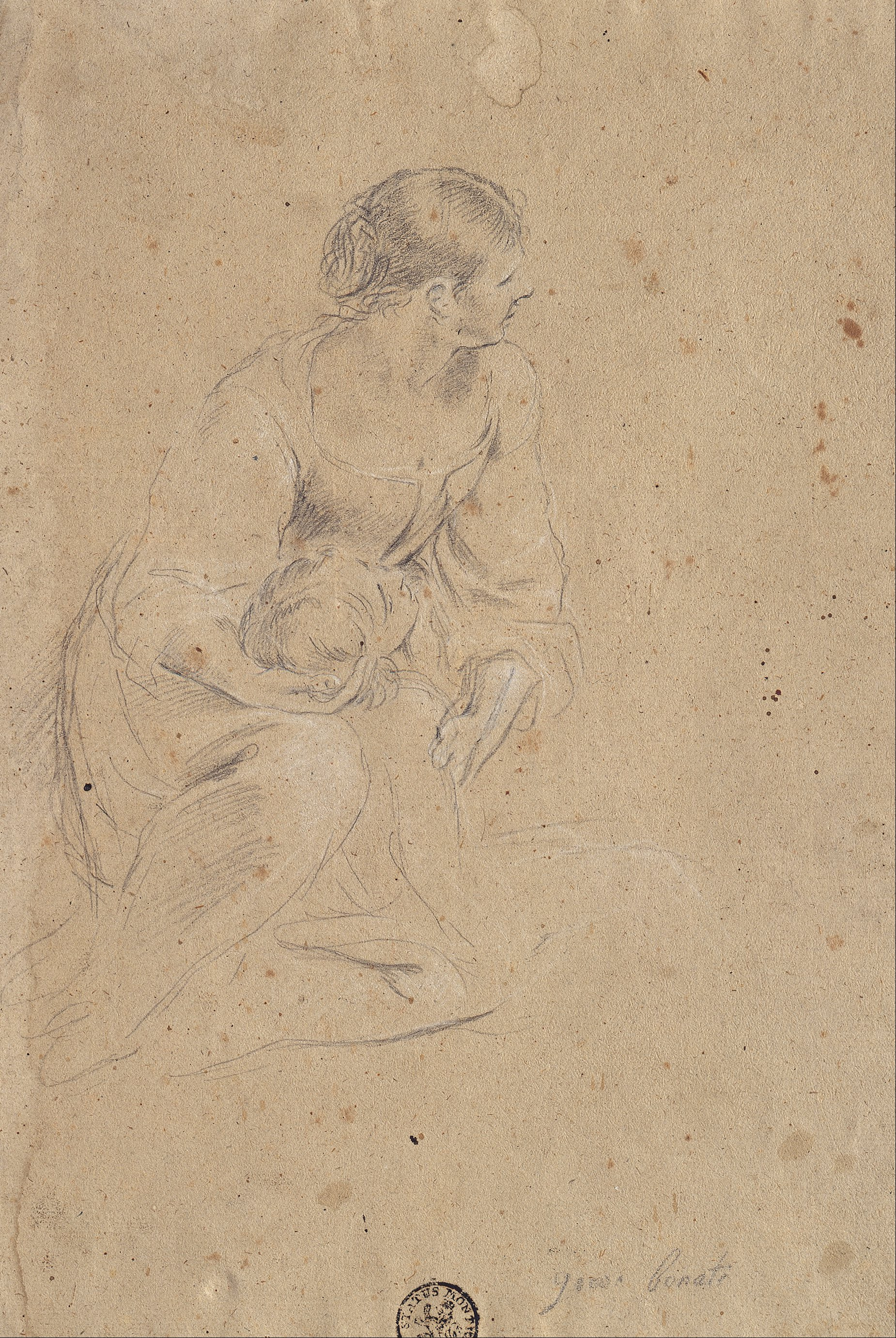
Study of a Female Figure, 1665

Giuseppe Bonati (1635 – 12 March 1681) was an Italian painter of the Baroque period, active in Rome and Ferrara.

He is also known as Giovannino del Pio or Giovanni Bonatti. He initially trained as a pupil of Francesco Costanzo Cattaneo and Leonello Bononi. Under the patronage of cardinal Carlo Pio di Savoia, in 1658 he was sent to Bologna to train with Guercino. In 1662, he travels to Rome to work in the studio of Pier Francesco Mola. Bonati attempts to establish a studio to rival Carlo Maratta. Along with his patrons, he traveled through Italy, including Venice, returning in 1665 to Rome. In Rome he worked in many churches, including Santa Croce in Gerusalemme (Saint Bernard miraculously extracts a tooth from relics of Saint Caesarius of Terracina, the first autel on the left side) and Santa Maria in Vallicella. In the Museo Capitolino are paintings of Rinaldo leaves Armida as well as Sisera and Jael. He painted for Queen Christina of Sweden, too.
