= Forrest Baugher =

American electrician and politician (1934–2017)

Member of the Washington House of Representatives from the 15th district
- In office January 14, 1985 – January 14, 1991
- Preceded by: Harold R. Clayton
- Succeeded by: Barbara Lisk

Personal details
- Born: December 29, 1934 Yakima, Washington, U.S.
- Died: January 5, 2017 (aged 82) Wapato, Washington, U.S.
- Party: Democratic
- Spouse(s): Norma Baugher, Patricia Hammock Baugher
- Profession: electrician

Forrest Baugher (December 29, 1934 – January 6, 2017) was a politician and electrician in the American state of Washington.

He served in the Washington House of Representatives from 1985 to 1991 for District 15, encompassing the Yakima Valley and parts of Benton County, as a Democrat. Prior to his term in the House, Baugher was an electrician, and served on the Govemor's Electrical Licensing Board for four years. He was born and raised in Wapato, Washington.

He was married to Norma and has two daughters, Jeanne and Sandra. With his wife, he operates an orchard in Parker, Washington. Baugher died in 2017 at his ranch.

Baugher was a member of the International Brotherhood of Electrical Workers (local 112), the Masonic Lodge, and was a Shriner. He was also an orchardist for 55 years.

== Additional sources ==
- Article "Forrest Allen Baugher" by YakimaHerald.com
