= Forest (disambiguation) =

A forest is a large area covered by trees.

Forest may also refer to:

== Businesses and organisations ==
- FOREST ("Freedom Organisation for the Right to Enjoy Smoking Tobacco"), a British smokers' rights organisation
- Forest Institute, a private American university
- Forest Laboratories, an American pharmaceutical company
- Forest School (disambiguation)

== Computing ==
- Forest (application), a productivity app
- Forest (data structure), a set of zero or more disjoint tree data structures
- Forest, a collection structure in Active Directory

== Film and television ==
- Forest (1980 film) (Russian: Лес), a Soviet comedy film
- Forest (2003 film), a Bulgarian film
- Forest (TV series), a 2020 South Korean drama
- Forest (2025 film), an Indian film

== Music ==
- Forest (band), a 1960s UK psych-folk band
- Forest (George Winston album), 1994
- Forest (Lee Seung-gi EP), 2012
- Forest (Seirom EP), 2011
- Forest, a 2004 album by Circle
- "A Forest", a 1980 song by The Cure
- "Forest", a song by System of a Down on their second album Toxicity
- "Forest", a song by Twenty One Pilots from their album Regional at Best

== People ==
- Forest (name), a list of people with the given name or surname
- f0rest, pseudonym for Patrik Lindberg (born 1988), Swedish Counter-Strike player

== Places ==
=== United States ===
- Forest, Alabama, an unincorporated community
- Forest, California, an unincorporated community
- Forest, Indiana, an unincorporated community
- Forest, Louisiana, a village
- Forest, Mississippi, a city
- Forest, Ohio, a village
- Forest, Texas, community in Cherokee County
- Forest, Virginia, a census-designated place
- Forest, Washington, an unincorporated community
- Forest (community), Wisconsin, unincorporated community
- Forest, Fond du Lac County, Wisconsin, a town
- Forest, Richland County, Wisconsin, a town
- Forest, St. Croix County, Wisconsin, a town
- Forest, Vernon County, Wisconsin, a town
- Forest County (disambiguation)

=== Elsewhere ===
- Forest, Tasmania, Australia, a township near Smithton
- Forest, Belgium, a municipality
- Forest, Ontario, Canada, a community
- Forest, North Yorkshire, England, a hamlet
- Forest, Guernsey, a parish
- Forest (Mbeya ward), Tanzania, an administrative ward
- Forest (Waltham Forest ward), England, an administrative ward

== Sports ==
- Nottingham Forest F.C., a football club based in Nottingham, England
- Wanderers F.C. or Forest F.C., in London, a pioneer football club

== Other uses ==
- Forest (graph theory), an undirected graph all of whose connected components are trees
- Forest (name), a given name and surname
- Forest (novel), a 2001 novel by Australian author Sonya Hartnett
- Forest (painting), an oil painting by Paul Cézanne
- Forest (skyscraper), a building in Warsaw, Poland
- Forest Café, a community café and arts venue in central Edinburgh
- Forest Theater, a theater in Carmel-by-the-Sea, California
- New Forest coven, an alleged group of witches
- Royal forest, a hunting reserve for exclusive royal use

== See also ==
- The Forest (disambiguation)
- Forest City (disambiguation)
- Forest District (disambiguation)
- Forest Hill (disambiguation)
- Forest Hills (disambiguation)
- Forest Lake (disambiguation)
- Forest Park (disambiguation)
- Forest Preserve (disambiguation)
- Forest River (disambiguation)
- Forest Township (disambiguation)
- Forester (disambiguation)
- Forestville (disambiguation)
- Forrest (disambiguation)
- Lake Forest (disambiguation)
