= Forrest =

Forrest may refer to:

== Places ==
=== Australia ===
- Forrest, Australian Capital Territory
- Forrest, Victoria, a small rural township
- Division of Forrest, a federal division of the Australian House of Representatives, in Western Australia
- Electoral district of Forrest, Western Australia, an electoral district from 1904 to 1950
- Forrest Land District, Western Australia, a cadastral division
- Forrest, Western Australia, a small settlement and railway station
  - Forrest Airport
- Forrest River, Western Australia
- Forrest Highway, Western Australia

=== United States ===
- Forrest, Illinois, a village
- Forrest City, Arkansas
- Forrest Township, Livingston County, Illinois
- Forrest County, Mississippi
- Camp Forrest, an American World War II training base in Tullahoma, Tennessee

=== Elsewhere ===
- Forrest Pass, Marie Byrd Land, Antarctica
- Forrest, Manitoba, Canada, a small town
- Forrest Road, a street in Edinburgh, Scotland

== People and fictional characters ==
- Forrest (surname)
- Forrest (given name)
- Forrest (singer), born Forrest Thomas, an American singer popular in the UK and Netherlands
- Forrest., a former stage name of singer and rapper Forrest Frank

== Other uses ==
- Forrest City Cemetery, Forrest City, Arkansas, United States
- Tropical Storm Forrest (disambiguation), a storm and two typhoons
- Forrest School (disambiguation)
- Forrest Elementary School District, Cochise County, Arizona
- USS Forrest (DD-461), a World War II US Navy destroyer
- CSS Forrest, a Confederate gunboat in the American Civil War
- Forrest Group, a Belgian group of companies
- Forrest Baronets, a title in the Baronetage of the United Kingdom
- Forrest Theatre, Philadelphia, Pennsylvania
- "Forrest", a song by the Smith Street Band from More Scared of You Than You Are of Me, 2017

== See also ==
- Forrest classification, a classification of upper gastrointestinal hemorrhage
- Forrest Yoga, a modern style of yoga named for and founded by Ana T. Forrest
- Forrestal (disambiguation)
- Forrester (disambiguation)
- Forest (disambiguation)
