= Forbidden Forest =

Forbidden Forest may refer to:

- The Forbidden Forest, a fictional woodland in the Harry Potter series
- The Forbidden Forest, a 1955 novel by Mircea Eliade
- Forbidden Forest (video game), a Commodore 64 computer game
- Forbidden Forest (film), a 2004 Canadian documentary film
- Forbidden Forest is some sacred forest in Indonesian culture
- The Forbidden Forest, a location in Smurfs: The Lost Village and associated media.

== See also ==
- The Forest (disambiguation)
