= Sânziană =

Fairies in Romanian folklore

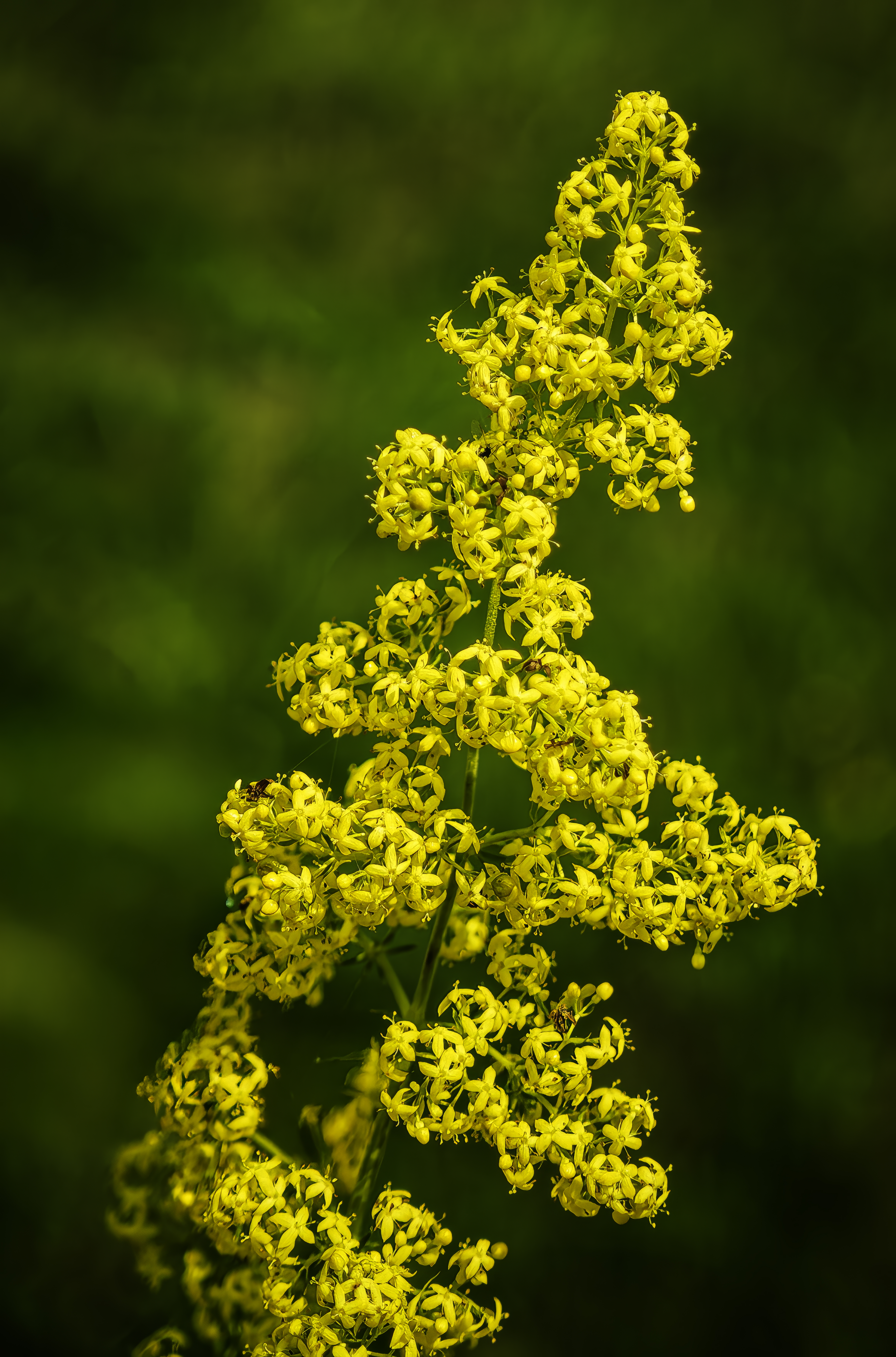
Sânziene (Lady's Bedstraw flowers)

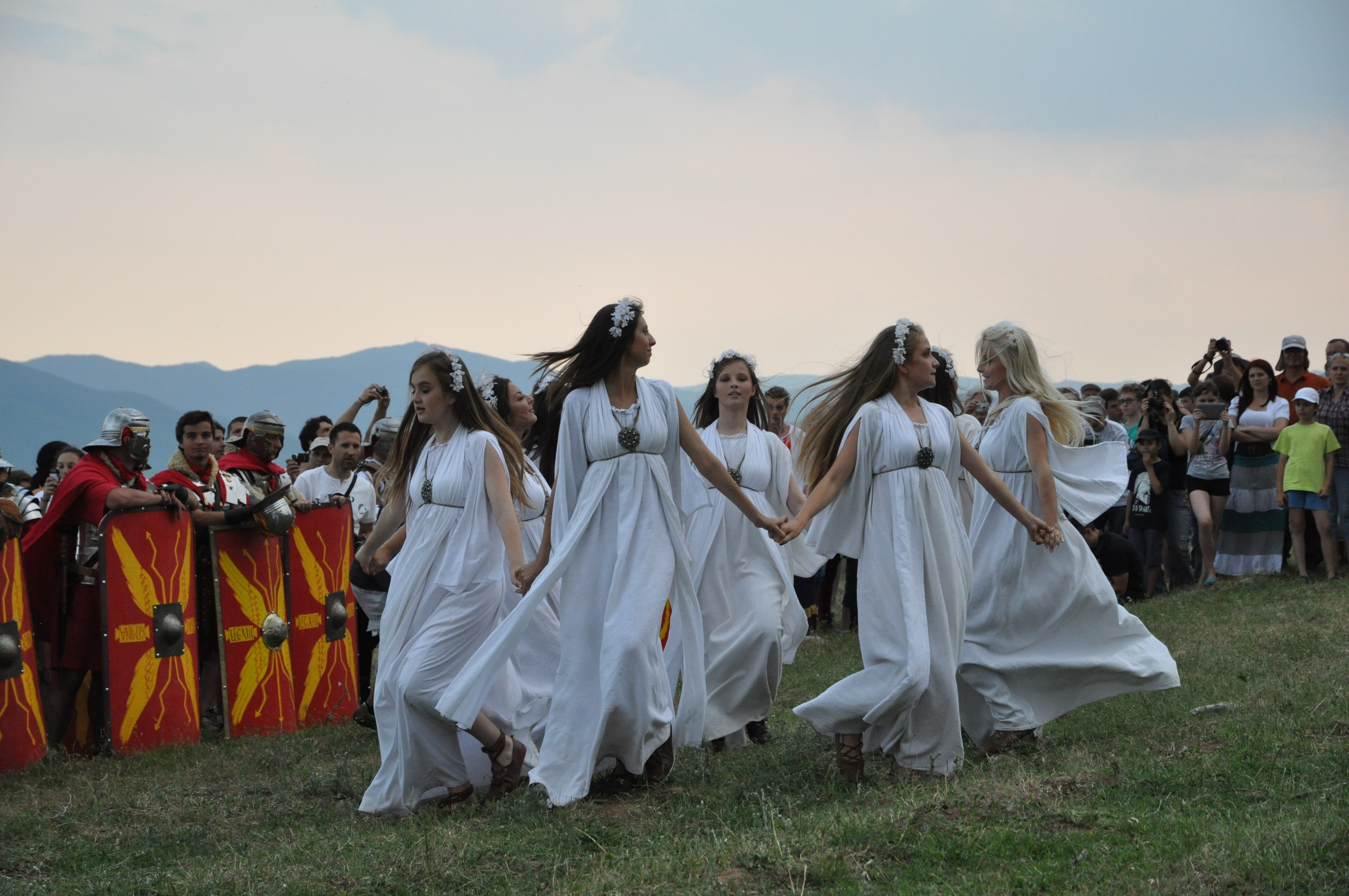
Sânzienele at Cricău Festival 2013

Sânziană is the Romanian name for gentle fairies who play an important part in local folklore, also used to designate the Galium verum or Cruciata laevipes flowers. Under the plural form Sânziene, the word designates an annual festival in the fairies' honor. Etymologically, the name comes from the Latin Sancta Diana, the Roman goddess of the hunt and moon, also celebrated in Roman Dacia (ancient Romania). Diana was known to be the virgin goddess and looked after virgins and women. She was one of the three maiden goddesses, Diana, Minerva and Vesta, who swore never to marry.

People in the western Carpathian Mountains celebrate the Sânziene holiday annually, on June 24. This is similar to the Swedish Midsummer holiday, and is believed to be a pagan celebration of the summer solstice in June. According to the official position of the Romanian Orthodox Church, the customs actually relate to the celebration of Saint John the Baptist's Nativity, which also happens on June 24.

== Sânziene rituals ==
The folk practices of Sânziene imply that the most beautiful maidens in the village dress in white and spend all day searching for and picking flowers, of which one MUST be Galium verum (Lady's bedstraw or Yellow bedstraw) which in Romanian is also named "Sânziànă". Using the flowers they picked during the day, the girls braid floral crowns which they wear upon returning to the village at nightfall. There they meet with their beloved and they dance around a bonfire. The crowns are thrown over the houses, and whenever the crown falls, it is said that someone will die in that house; if the crown stays on the roof of the house, then good harvest and wealth will be bestowed upon the owners. As with other bonfire celebrations, jumping over the embers after the bonfire is not raging anymore is done to purify the person and also to bring health.

Another folk belief is that during the Sânziene Eve night, the heavens open up, making it the strongest night for magic spells, especially for the love spells. Also it is said that the plants harvested during this night will have tremendous magical powers.

It is not a good thing though to be a male and walk at night during Sanziene Eve night, as that is the time when the fairies dance in the air, blessing the crops and bestowing health on people - they do not like to be seen by males, and whoever sees them will be maimed, or the fairies will take their hearing/speech or make them mad.

In some areas of the Carpathians, the villagers then light a big wheel of hay from the ceremonial bonfire and push it down a hill. This has been interpreted as a symbol for the setting sun (from the solstice to come and until the midwinter solstice, the days will be getting shorter).

== In cultural references ==
The consequences of heavens opening on Sânziene are connected by some to paranormal events reported during that period of each year. According to popular beliefs, strange things, both positive and negative, may happen to a person wandering alone on Sânziene night. Strange ethereal activities are believed to happen especially in places such as the Băneasa forest (near the capital of Bucharest) or the Baciu forest (near the city of Cluj-Napoca).

Mircea Eliade's novel, Noaptea de Sânziene (translated as The Forbidden Forest), includes references to the folk belief about skies opening at night, as well as to paranormal events happening in the Băneasa Forest.

In the form Sânziana ("the sânziană"), the word has also come to be used as a female name. It is notably used as such in Vasile Alecsandri's comedy Sânziana şi Pepelea (later an opera by George Stephănescu).

The fairy Sânziene, "the fairy of the summer solstice", is described in a colinda (Romanian folk song) as the "sister of the Sun".

Moldovan band Zdob şi Zdub recorded a song called Sânziene, which tells the story of a search for one's soulmate throughout a midsummer night festival.

== See also ==
- Diana (mythology)
- Ileana Cosânzeana
- Ileana Sînziana
- Rusalii
