= Forest Township, Minnesota =

Forest Township is the name of some places in the U.S. state of Minnesota:

- Forest Township, Becker County, Minnesota
- Forest Township, Rice County, Minnesota

See also: Forest Township (disambiguation)
