= Problematic smartphone use =

Psychological dependence on smartphones

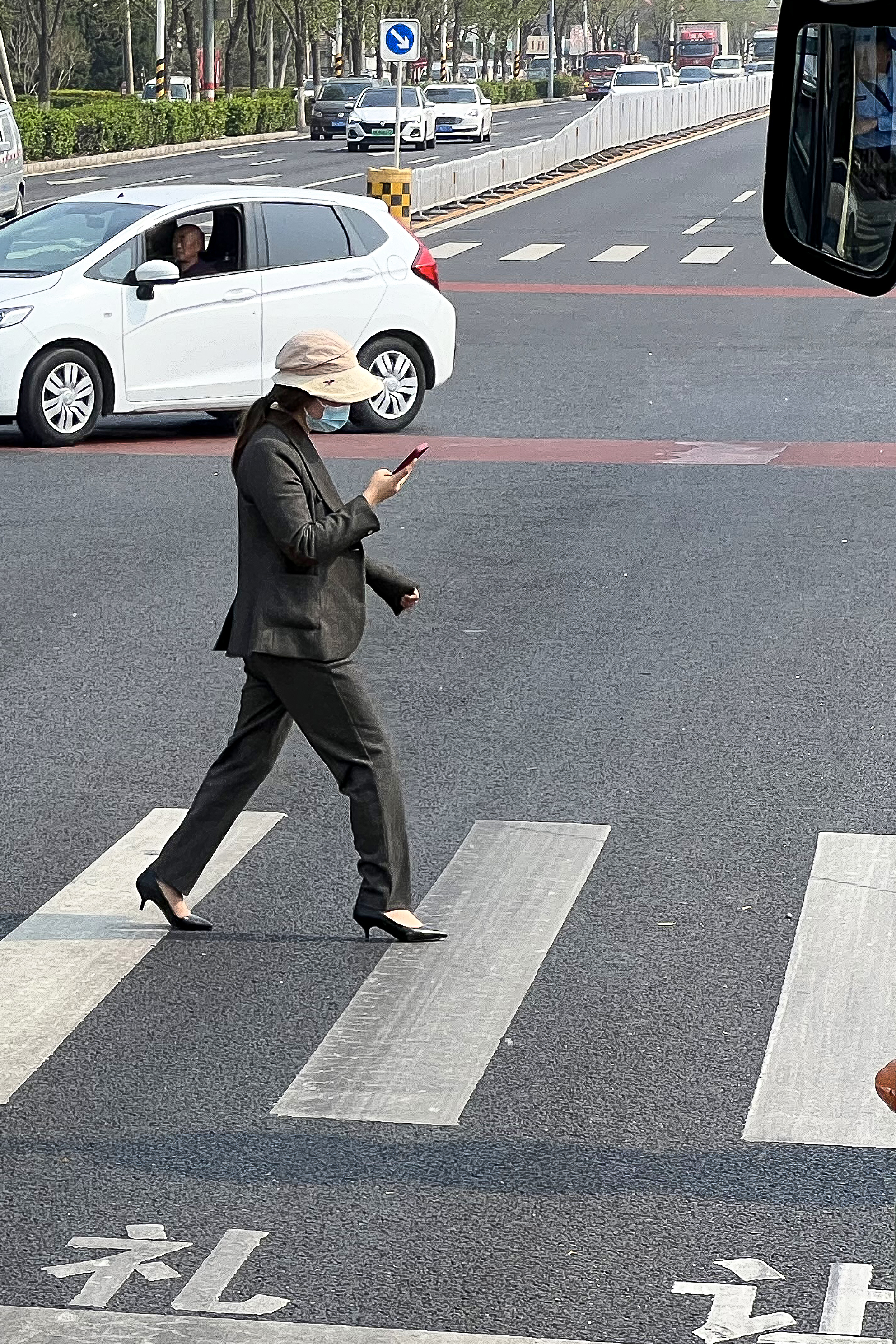
A pedestrian looking down at a smartphone while crossing a road in Beijing, China

Problematic smartphone use is psychological or behavioral dependence on mobile phones. It is closely related to other forms of digital media overuse such as social media addiction or internet addiction disorder.

Commonly known as "smartphone addiction", the term "problematic smartphone use" was proposed by researchers to describe similar behaviors presenting without evidence of addiction.

Problematic use can include preoccupation with mobile communication, excessive money or time spent on mobile phones, and use of mobile phones in socially or physically inappropriate situations, such as driving an automobile. Increased use can also lead to adverse effects on relationships, degraded mental or physical health, and increased anxiety when separated from a mobile phone or sufficient signal. At the same time, smartphones also play a positive role in modern life by enhancing communication, supporting task management, and providing tools such as portable navigation systems.

== History and terminology ==
Forms of technology addiction have been considered as diagnoses since the mid 1990s. In current research on the adverse consequences of technology overuse, "mobile phone overuse" has been proposed as a subset of forms of "digital addiction" or "digital dependence", reflecting increasing trends of compulsive behavior among users of technological devices. Researchers have termed these behaviors "smartphone addiction" and "problematic smartphone use", as well as referring to use of non-smartphone mobile devices (cell phones).

Excessive use of technological devices may affect developmental, social, mental, and physical well-being and result in symptoms similar to behavioral addictions, but the Diagnostic and Statistical Manual of Mental Disorders has not formally codified problematic smartphone use as a diagnosis. Widely accepted recommendations for the treatment of problematic use behaviors do not yet exist in part due to the lack of well-established evidence or expert consensus, the differing emphasis of the classification manuals, and difficulties using animal models for analysis.

While published studies have shown associations between digital media use and mental health symptoms or diagnoses, causality has not been established, with nuances and caveats of researchers often misunderstood by the general public, or misrepresented by the media. A systematic review of reviews published in 2019 concluded that evidence—although of mainly low to moderate quality—showed an association between screen time and poorer psychological health, including symptoms such as inattention, hyperactivity, low self esteem, and behavioral issues in childhood and adolescence. Several studies have shown that females are more likely to overuse social media, while males are more likely to overuse video games. This has led experts to suggest that digital media overuse may not be a unified phenomenon, with some calling to delineate proposed disorders based on individual online activity.

Due to the lack of recognition and consensus on the concepts, diagnoses and treatments are difficult to standardize or recommend.

== Prevalence ==
The stated prevalence of forms of technology overuse have varied considerably, with marked variations by nation and increases over time.

Prevalence of mobile phone overuse depends largely on definitions and the scales used to quantify behaviors. Two main scales are in use, in both adult and adolescent populations: the 20-item self-reported Problematic Use of Mobile Phones (PUMP) scale, and the Mobile Phone Problem Use Scale (MPPUS). There are variations in the age, gender, and percentage of the population affected problematically according to the scales and definitions used. The prevalence among British adolescents aged 11–14 was 10%. In India, addiction is stated at 39-44% for this age group. Under different diagnostic criteria, the estimated prevalence ranges from 0 to 38%, with self-attribution of mobile phone addiction exceeding the prevalence estimated in the studies themselves. The prevalence of the related problem of internet addiction was 4.9-10.7% in South Korea, and is now regarded as a serious public health issue. A questionnaire survey in South Korea also found that these teenagers are twice as likely to admit that they are "mobile phone addicted" as adults. They also believe smartphone communication has become an important part of their lives and an important way to maintain social relationships. Additional scales used to measure smartphone addictions are the Korean Scale for Internet Addiction for adolescents (K-scale), the Smartphone Addiction Scale (SAS-SV), and the Smartphone Addiction Proneness Scale (SAPS). These implicit tests were validated in a 2018 study as means of measuring smartphone and internet addiction in children and adolescents.

Behaviors associated with mobile-phone addiction differ between genders. Older people are less likely to develop addictive mobile phone behavior because of different social usage, stress, and greater self-regulation. A 2019 study by British media regulator Ofcom showed that 50% of 10-year-olds in the UK owned a smartphone.

A study conducted by researchers at the University of Toronto Mississauga surveyed over 50,000 participants across 195 countries to examine global patterns of smartphone usage. The findings indicated consistent trends in problematic smartphone use, particularly among younger women. The study suggests that social and cultural factors, such as the emphasis on social connectivity and the role of smartphones in daily life, contribute to these patterns. Additionally, the research highlights the importance of considering the context of smartphone use when assessing its impact on individuals' well-being. For instance, extensive use for professional purposes may not be problematic, whereas usage that interferes with sleep or daily activities might indicate issues.

== Negative effects ==
Overuse of mobile phones may be associated with negative outcomes on mental and physical health, in addition to having an impact on how users interact socially.

=== Social ===
Clinical psychologist Lisa Merlo says, "Some patients pretend to talk on the phone or fiddle with apps to avoid eye contact or other interactions at a party." Furthermore, a 2011 study showed

- 70% check their phones in the morning within an hour of getting up;
- 56% check their phones before going to bed;
- 48% check their phones over the weekend;
- 51% constantly check their phones during vacation; and
- 44% reported they would feel very anxious and irritable if they did not interact with their phones within a week.

This change in style from face-to-face to text-based conversation has also been observed by American psychologist Sherry Turkle. Her work cites connectivity as an important trigger of social behavior change regarding communication; therefore, this adaptation of communicating is not caused only by the phone itself. Turkle also argues that people now find themselves in a state of "continual co-presence" where digital communication allows the occurrence of two or more realities in the same place and time. Subsequently, they also live in a "world of continual partial attention," the process of paying simultaneous attention to a number of sources of incoming information, but at a superficial level. Bombarded with an abundance of emails, texts and other messages, people not only find themselves divesting people of their human characteristics or individuality, but also increasingly treating them as digital units. This is often referred to as depersonalization.

According to Elliot Berkman, a psychology professor at the University of Oregon, the constant checking of phones is caused by reward learning and the fear of missing out (FOMO). Berkman explains that, "Habits are a product of reinforcement learning, one of our brain's most ancient and reliable systems," and therefore people tend to develop habits of completing behaviors that have rewarded them in the past. For many, using a mobile phone has been enjoyable in the past, due to the reinforcing positive feelings when receiving and responding to a notification. Berkman also iterates that people often check their smartphones to relieve the social pressure they place upon themselves to never miss out on exciting things. As Berkman says, "Smartphones can be an escape from boredom because they are a window into many worlds other than the one right in front of you, helping us feel included and involved in society." When people do not check their mobile phones, they are unable to satisfy this "check habit" or suppress the fear of missing out, leading to anxiety and irritability. According to Timothy Oblad, increased smartphone use among adolescents has been linked to negative outcomes such as depression and self-harm and found that excessive use correlates with these issues, particularly among teens aged 13–15.

Other implications of cell phone use in mental health symptoms were observed by Thomée et al. in Sweden. This study found a relationship between report of mental health and perceived stress of participants' accessibility, which is defined as the possibility to be disturbed at any moment of day or night.

Critics of smartphones have especially raised concerns about effects on youth, in particular isolation, and its effects on social and emotional development. The presence of smartphones in everyday life may affect social interactions amongst teenagers. Present evidence shows that smartphones are not only decreasing face-to-face social interactions between teenagers, but are also making them less likely to talk to adults. In a study produced by Doctor Lelia Green at Edith Cowan University, researchers discovered that "the growing use of mobile technologies implies a progressive digital colonization of children's lives, reshaping the interactions of younger adults." Face-to-face interactions have decreased because of the increase in shared interactions via social media, mobile video sharing, and digital instant messaging. Critics believe the primary concern in this shift is that the youth are inhibiting themselves of constructive social interactions and emotional practices.

Social media has changed how people communicate with each other. Nowadays, how we interact and process information is completely different. A huge worry that people have is that kids' attention spans are much shorter, and they believe that it's because of social media. Over 90 percent of teachers have had concerns about students' mental health over the past few years. The access to social media and communication on multiple devices has screen time taking over. A survey was conducted by the National Education Association of nearly 3,000 members working in school classrooms from kindergarten through twelfth grade. The survey shows that the top contributing factors to concerns of mental health include personal device use and social media. The survey also highlighted that teachers are increasingly worried about how social media affects students' ability to focus, communicate, and build interpersonal skills. Constant use of one's phone has been shown to cause people to even create their own interruptions by constantly checking things like text messages and emails, even to the degree of hearing their phone or feeling it vibrate when there have been no alerts made in reality. By constantly seeing the glamorous lives that people on the internet perpetuate of themselves, more viewers of such media are led to be less happy with their lives, have increased feelings of jealousy, and also have lowered self-esteem.

Other studies show a positive social aspect from smartphone use. A study on whether smartphone presence changed responses to social stress involved 148 males and females around the age of 20. Exposed to a social-exclusion stressor and measuring levels of alpha-amylase (sAA) stress hormone, the results showed higher levels of sAA and cortisol in the group with no phone access, suggesting that the presence of a smartphone, even if it's not being used, can decrease the negative effects of social exclusion.

=== Hygiene ===
Research from the London School of Hygiene and Tropical Medicine at Queen Mary in 2011 indicated that one in six cell phones is contaminated with fecal matter. Some of the contaminated phones were also harboring pathogenic strains of bacteria such as E. coli which can result in fever, vomiting, and diarrhea. Other research has found a high risk of transmitting such bacteria by medical staff who carry their cellphones during their shift, because cellphones act as a reservoir where the bacteria can thrive.

=== Health ===
The International Agency for Research on Cancer stated in 2011 that radio frequency radiation (RF) is a possible human carcinogen, based on limited evidence of an increased risk of developing glioma tumors.

In 2018 the US National Toxicology Program (NTP) published the results of its ten-year, $30 million study of the effects of radio frequency radiation on laboratory rodents, which found 'clear evidence' of malignant heart tumors (schwannomas) and 'some evidence' of malignant gliomas and adrenal tumors in male rats. In 2019, the NTP scientists published an article stating that RF scientists found evidence of 'significant' DNA damage in the frontal cortex and hippocampus of male rat brains and the blood cells of female mice. In 2018 the Ramazzini Cancer Research Institute study of cell phone radiation and cancer published its results and concluded that "The RI findings on far field exposure to RFR are consistent with and reinforce the results of the NTP study on near field exposure, as both reported an increase in the incidence of tumors of the brain and heart in RFR-exposed Sprague-Dawley rats. These tumors are of the same histotype of those observed in some epidemiological studies on cell phone users. These experimental studies provide sufficient evidence to call for the re-evaluation of IARC conclusions regarding the carcinogenic potential of RFR in humans."

Research has shown that diminished quantity and quality of sleep could also be due to an inhibited secretion of melatonin.

In 2014, 58% of World Health Organization countries advised the general population to reduce radio frequency exposure below heating guidelines. The most common advice is to use hands-free kits (69%), to reduce call time (44%), use text messaging (36%), avoid calling with low signals (24%), or use phones with low specific absorption rate (SAR) (22%). In 2015 Taiwan banned toddlers under the age of two from using mobile phones or any similar electronic devices, and France banned Wi-Fi from toddlers' nurseries.

As adoption increases, accompanying behavioral health issues and problematic usage patterns become more apparent. Mobile phones continue to become more multifunctional and sophisticated, which exacerbates the problem.

In 2014 the BBC reported concerns from opticians regarding blue-violet light emitted by cell phone screens, that it may be potentially hazardous to the eye and long term it may possibly increase the risk of macular degeneration. The position of the American Macular Degeneration Foundation is that the evidence for this risk, considering the relatively low intensity emitted by device screens, is inconclusive at best.

=== Education and economic outcomes ===
Researchers found in a 2025 study in which they were able to control for various factors that led to mobile phone usage found that college students who spent more time gaming on their mobile phones got substantially worse grades and worse future earnings than students who spent less time gaming.

=== Psychological ===
There are concerns that some mobile phone users incur considerable debt, and that mobile phones are being used to violate privacy and harass others. In particular, there is increasing evidence that mobile phones are being used as a tool by children to bully other children.

There is a large amount of research on mobile phone use, and its positive and negative influence on the human's psychological mind, mental health and social communication. Mobile phone users may encounter stress, sleep disturbances and symptoms of depression, especially young adults. Consistent phone use can cause a chain reaction, affecting one aspect of a user's life and expanding to affect other aspects. It often starts with social disorders, which can lead to depression and stress, and ultimately affect lifestyle habits such as sleep and diet.

Research has shown a correlation between mobile phone overuse and depression. In the wake of the emergence of smartphones, American professor of psychology Jean M. Twenge found an increase in depressive symptoms and even suicides among adolescents in 2010. Avid adolescent smartphone users are spending so much time on the devices that they forgo face-to-face human interaction, which is seen as essential to mental health: "The more time teens spend looking at screens, the more likely they are to report symptoms of depression." Twenge also notes that three out of four American teens owned an iPhone, and with this rates of teen depression and suicide have skyrocketed since 2011 following the release of the iPhone in 2007 and the iPad in 2010. Compounding this, teens now spend the majority of their leisure time on their phones; eighth-graders who spend 10 or more hours a week on social media are 56% more likely to be unhappy than those who devote less time to social media.

Psychologist Nancy Colier has argued that people have lost sight of what is truly important to them in life, saying that people have become "disconnected from what really matters, from what makes us feel nourished and grounded as human beings." Addiction to technology has deterred neurological and relationship development because mobile technology is being introduced to people at a very young age. Colier states: "Without open spaces and downtime, the nervous system never shuts down—it's in constant fight-or-flight mode. We're wired and tired all the time. Even computers reboot, but we're not doing it."

The amount of time spent on screens appears to have a correlation with happiness levels. A nationally representative study of American 12th graders funded by the National Institute on Drug Abuse titled Monitoring the Future Survey found that "teens who spent more time than average on screen activities are more likely to be unhappy, and those who spend more time than average on non-screen activities are more likely to be happy."

Adolescents use smartphones in a multitude of ways , where associations with well-being vary by specific categories of apps or types of smartphone use. Social and non-social (e.g., entertainment, games) smartphone use can shape adolescent development and are differentially associated with anxiety and depression. While different phone metrics—like screen time (duration), pickups (app launched after pickup), and notifications—are related, they reflect fundamentally different behaviors and experiences (i.e., controllability) that are differentially related to positive and negative outcomes.

Extant research has revealed that the impact of smartphone use on adolescent outcomes is complex, varied, and context-dependent.

While it is easy to see a correlation between cell phone overuse and these symptoms of depression, anxiety, isolation, and poor sleep, it is much harder to prove causation, i.e. that cell phones themselves cause these issues. There are many other overlapping factors that also increase depression in people. According to psychologist Peter Etchells, although parents and other figures share these concerns, two other possible explanations are that depressed teens may use mobile devices more, or teens could be more open to discussing or admitting to depression than other age groups.

A survey done by a group of independent opticians revealed that 43% of people under the age of 25 experienced anxiety or even irritation when they were not able to access their phone whenever they wanted. Smartphone dependence is also associated with increased number of phantom phone signals, as in phantom vibration syndrome.

=== Neural ===
There has been considerable speculation about the impact problematic mobile usage may have on cognitive development and how such habits could be 'rewiring' the brains of those highly engaged with their mobiles. Research has shown that the reward areas of the brains of those who use their phones more exhibit different structural connectivity than those who use their phones less. For example, some meta-analytic research has reported structural and functional neural correlates of excessive smartphone use, including reduced brain volumes and altered activations in regions supporting cognitive processes, though researchers note that most findings are observational and cannot determine causality.

=== Distracted driving ===
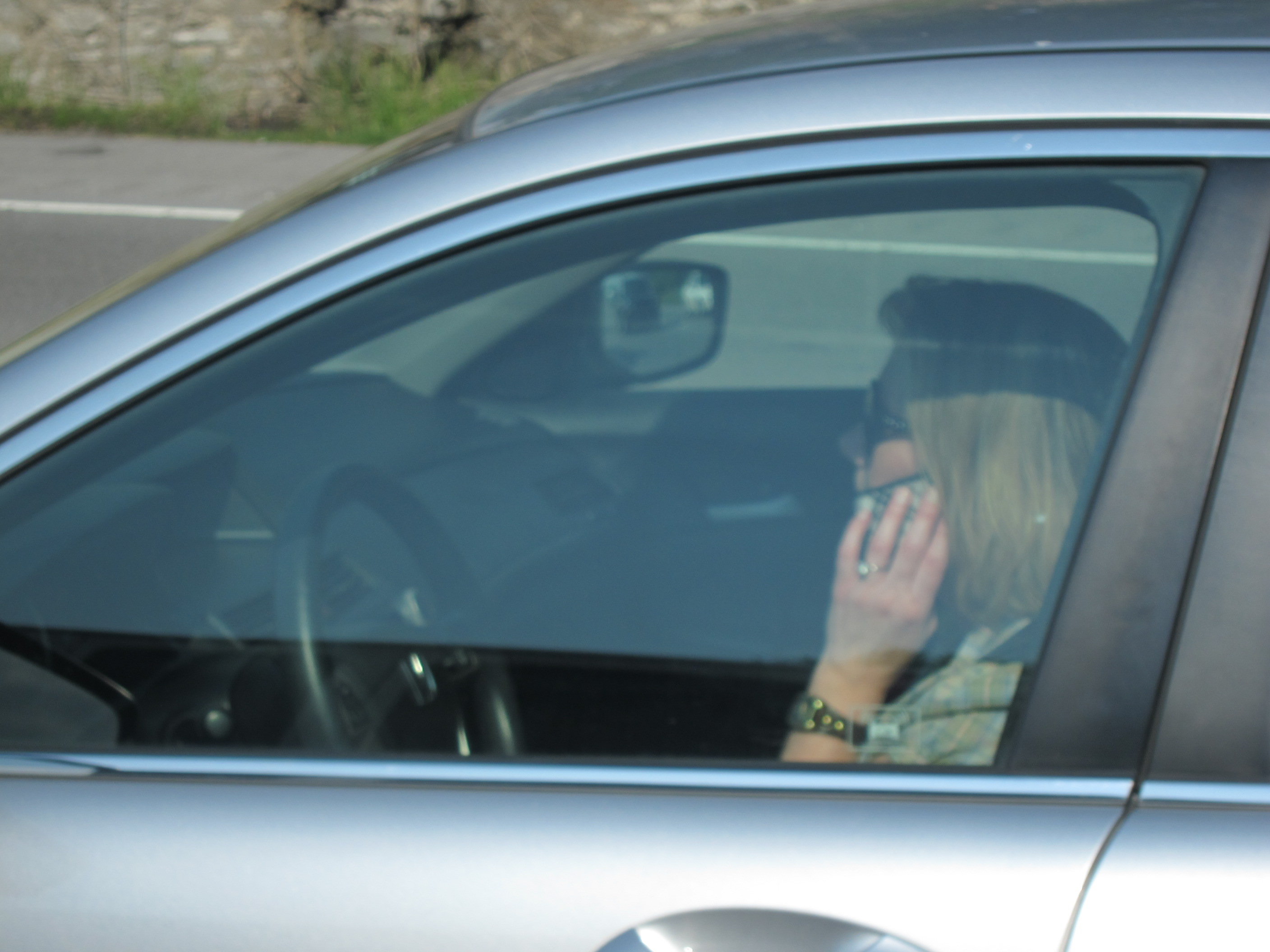
A driver talking on a cellphone

US statistics show over 8 people are killed and 1,161 injured daily due to distracted driving. At any given daylight moment in the US, approximately 660,000 drivers are using cell phones or electronic devices while driving. A significant number of injuries and accidents from distracted driving can be attributed at least partially to use of a mobile phone, and many phone-related crashes are not reported due to drivers' reluctance to admit to phone use while driving. According to the National Highway Traffic Safety Administration, drivers between the ages of 16 and 24 were most distracted, with women at greater risk of dying in a crash. About 20,000 of motor vehicle fatalities between 2012 and 2017 were related to distracted driving.

There is currently no US federal ban on texting while driving, but several states as well as Washington D.C., Puerto Rico, and the U.S. Virgin Islands have passed laws prohibiting the use of hand-held devices while driving. New drivers in 38 states and DC are not permitted to use cell phones behind the wheel.

In the United Kingdom, any phone use while in control of a vehicle (which includes instructing or accompanying a learner driver) without a hands-free system carries a minimum £200 fine and license penalties, including when the vehicle is stationary.

A text can take one's eyes off the road for an average of five seconds. Although brief, at 55 miles per hour (89 km/h) a vehicle travels 400 feet (120 m) or just over the length of a football field in that time. A 2021 national study conducted by the United States Department of Transportation found that approximately three percent of drivers were talking on the phone when stopped at an intersection, and estimated that at any point in time about five percent of drivers are on the phone. The Insurance Institute for Highway Safety (IIHS) also reported that cell phone users tended to brake harder, drive faster, and change lanes more frequently, predisposing them to crashes and near-crashes; they are two to six times more likely to be involved in accidents.

Research indicates cell phone use adversely affects driver performance, delaying reaction time, increasing lane deviations, and decreasing time spent observing the road. It can also increase "inattention blindness" in which drivers see but do not register what is in front of them.

Teen drivers are especially at risk; distractions such as music, games, GPS, and social media are potentially deadly when combined with inexperience. The dangers of driving and multitasking continue to rise as more technology is integrated into cars. Teens who texted more frequently were less likely to wear a seat belt and more likely to drive intoxicated or ride with a drunk driver. Cell phone use can affect young drivers' abilities to control vehicles, pay attention to the roadway, and respond promptly to traffic events.

== Tools to prevent or treat mobile phone overuse ==
The following tools or interventions can be used to prevent or treat mobile phone overuse.

=== Contextual factors ===
Recent research by Kostadin Kushlev, a psychology professor at Georgetown University, suggests that the effects of smartphone use on well-being depend largely on the context in which they are used. He introduces a framework with three categories: displacement, interference, and complementarity. Displacement happens when smartphone use replaces more meaningful or productive activities, such as spending time with others or completing tasks. Interference refers to situations where phone use interrupts ongoing activities, like checking notifications during a conversation. Complementarity describes phone use that supports or enhances what someone is already doing, such as using a map app while traveling. According to Kushlev, recognizing these different types of use can help people form healthier habits without ignoring the useful functions smartphones provide.

=== Behavioral ===
Many studies have found relationships between psychological or mental health issues and smartphone addiction. Some studies show support groups and psychotherapeutic approaches such as cognitive behavioral therapy, motivational interviewing, and family therapy are able to successfully treat internet addiction and may be useful for mobile phone overuse.

Complete abstinence from mobile phone use or abstinence from certain apps can also help treat mobile phone overuse. Other behavioral interventions include practicing the opposite (e.g. disrupt the user's normal routine and force them to re-adapt to a new usage pattern), goal-setting, reminder cards, and listing alternative activities (e.g. exercise, music, art, reading).

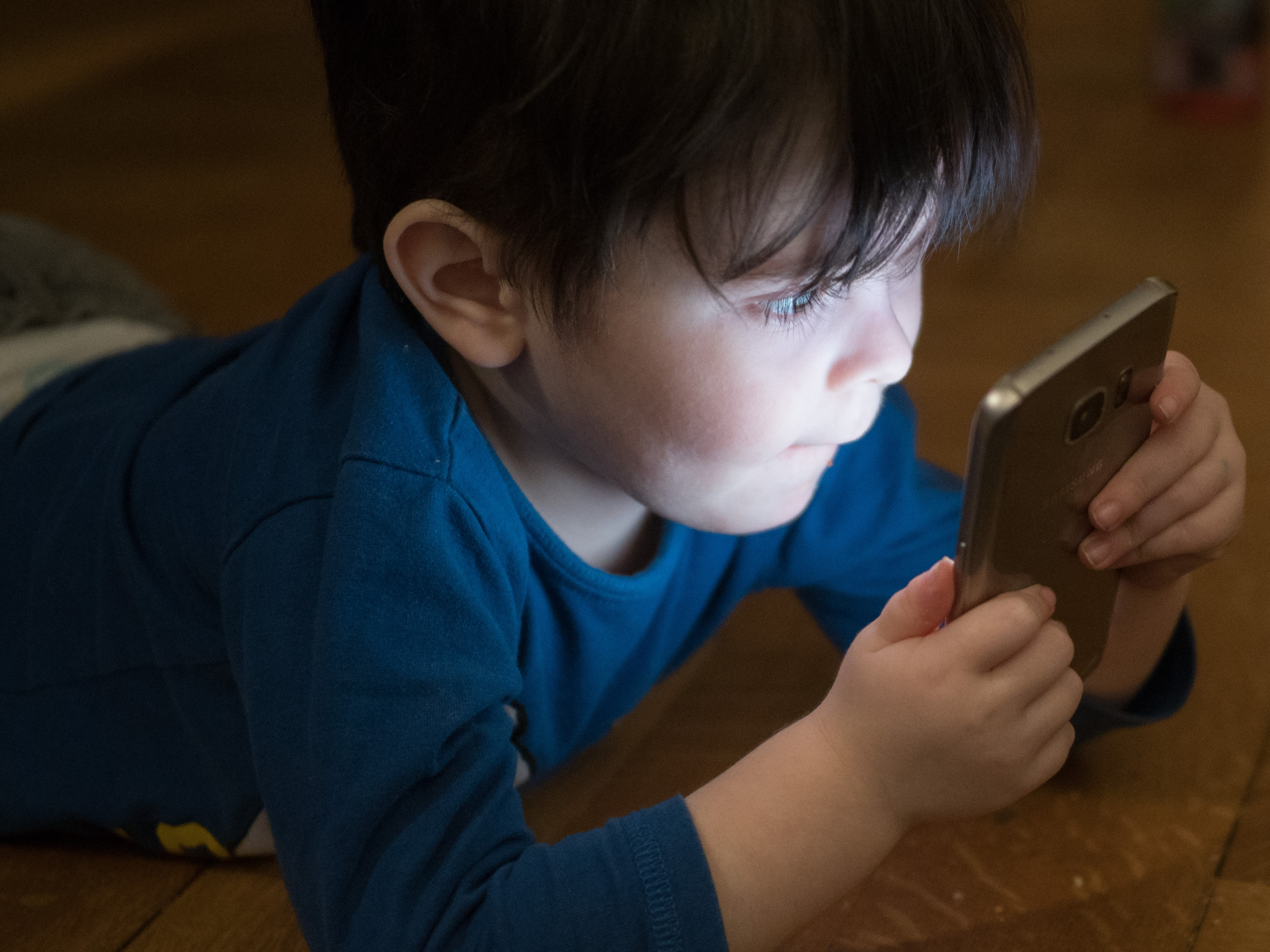
A young child using a smartphone

In 2019 the World Health Organization issued recommendations about active lifestyle, sleep and screen time for children up to five years of age. These recommendations include limiting daily screen time to one hour, and no screen time at all before the age of two years. They also include three hours of physical activity daily from the age of one year, 14–17 hours of sleep for infants, and 10–13 hours sleep for three year-olds and older.

=== Phone settings ===
Many smartphone addiction activists (such as Tristan Harris) recommend turning one's phone screen to grayscale mode, which helps reduce time spent on mobile phones by making them boring to look at. Other phone settings alterations for mobile phone non-use included turning on airplane mode, turning off cellular data and/or Wi-Fi, turning off the phone, removing specific apps, and factory resetting.

=== Phone apps ===
German psychotherapist and online addiction expert Bert te Wildt recommends using apps such as Offtime and Menthal to help prevent mobile phone overuse. Several third-party applications have also been developed to help users regulate smartphone use and reduce digital distractions. Freedom allows users to schedule blocks on selected apps and websites across multiple devices. AppBlock uses similar scheduling features, with a strict mode that restricts changes to active blocking settings. Forest employs a gamified approach, using timed focus sessions during which users grow virtual trees by refraining from phone use.

Apple first added a function in iOS 12 called "Screen Time" that allows users to see how much time they have spent on the phone. In Android a similar feature called "Digital Wellbeing" has been implemented to keep track of cell phone usage. These work by increasing user awareness with usage summary notifications, or notifying the user when user-defined time limits have been exceeded.

=== Research-based ===
Studying and developing interventions for temporary mobile phone non-use is a growing area of research, and has guided the design of apps for managing overuse. In a 2016 study, researchers generated 100 different design ideas for mobile phone non-use, each belonging to several categories. Users found interventions based on three of the eight categories to be the most useful: information (agnostically providing information to users about their usage behavior), mindfulness (users are prompted to reflect on their choices before, during, or after making them), and limits (certain behaviors are time or context-bound, or otherwise constrained within defined parameters). The researchers implemented an Android app called "MyTime" that combined these three intervention types, and found that users reduced their time with their problem apps by 21%, while use of apps they felt were a good use of time remained unchanged.

Other apps resulting from these research efforts include AppDetox, which allows users to define rules that limit their usage of specific apps, and PreventDark which detects and prevents problematic overuse in the dark. Using vibrations instead of notifications to limit app usage has also been found to be effective. Other researchers have found group-based interventions that rely on users sharing their limiting behaviors with others to be effective. Mobile media education (in particular, teaching of time and attention management skills) can also reduce problematic smartphone use and increase wellbeing among high school students.

=== Alternative phones ===
Another approach to reducing mobile phone overuse is to use simpler devices. Feature phones, dumbphones and minimalist phones generally provide fewer applications and less access to social media, games and other distracting services. As well as traditional mobile phones such as Nokia or flip phones, there are modern smartphones that only have essential apps, such as the FocusPhone. These retain certain smartphone functions, such as messaging, browsing, music and online banking, whilst restricting access to other apps and services.

=== Bans on mobile phone use ===
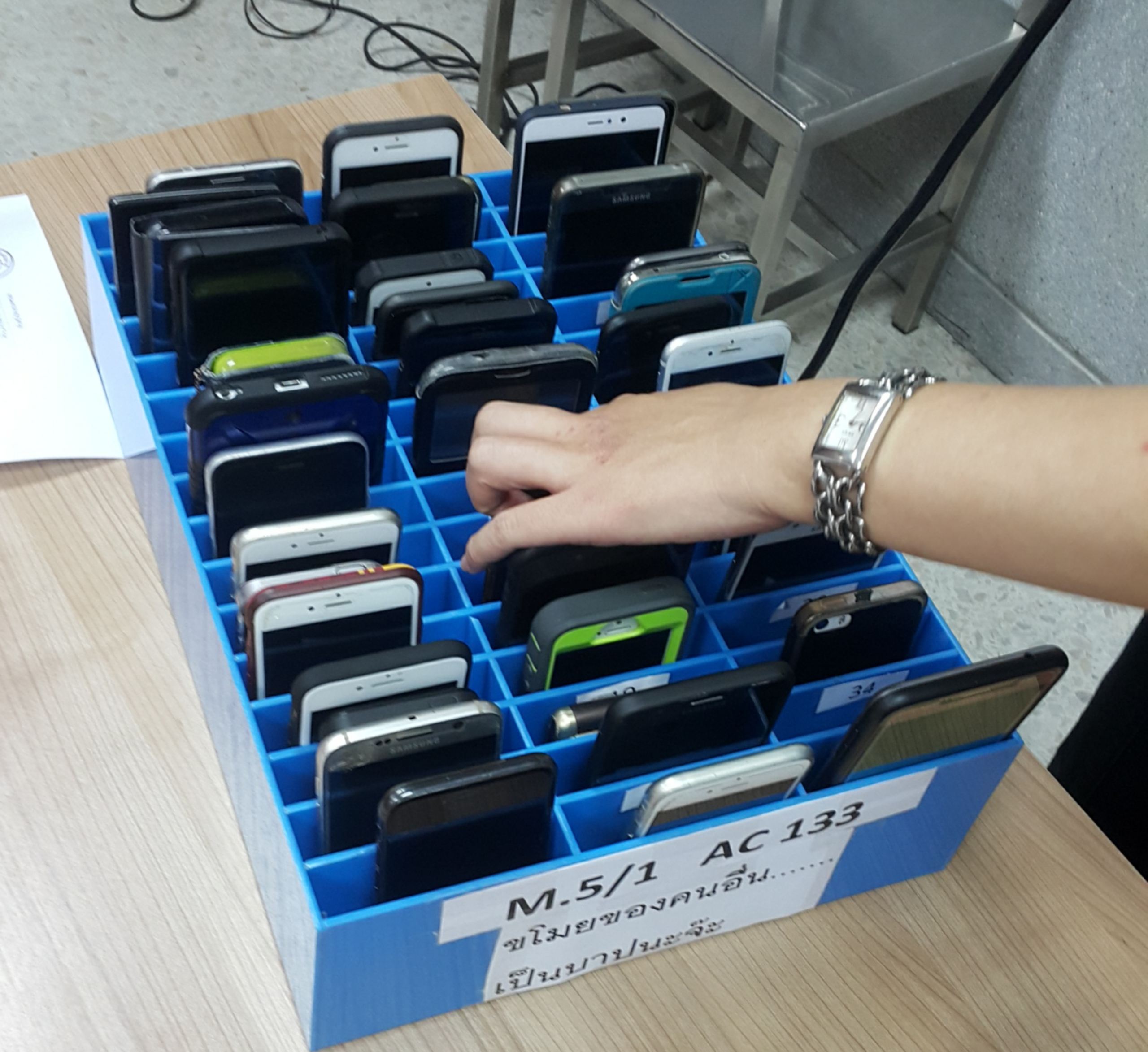
In some schools, a mobile phone cage is used to prevent students from using smartphones in the classroom during lessons.

In parts of the world, mobile phones are banned in school settings. In France and Ontario, Canada, the use of mobile phones is banned during instructional time in an effort to improve the performance of students. In 2021, China banned mobile phones in schools unless students have written parental consent.

One example of a grassroots response is the UK's Smartphone Free Childhood movement, founded in 2024 by two parents in Suffolk. The initiative encourages families to delay giving smartphones to children until at least age 14 by building local community pacts and providing support through school events and parent groups. The movement gained national attention after being featured in major British media, and by mid-2025 it had attracted over 140,000 signatories from across the UK.

== Psychological symptoms of phone usage ==
Persistent smartphone overuse can result in symptoms that can be grouped into three broad categories: depression, social isolation, and low self-esteem or anxiety.

=== Depression ===
Depression is a mental illness that adversely influences emotion, imagination, and self-regulation. Depressive symptoms can be serious psychological problems in adolescents; the relationship between depressive symptoms and mobile phone addiction is of critical importance because they can sometimes lead to substance abuse, school failure and even suicide.

=== Isolation ===
Social isolation is the lack of interaction between individuals and society. Communication conducted largely or exclusively online reduces face-to-face interactions with other people and can adversely affect normal social development and interpersonal relationships. This can in turn affect social support, increase other compulsive behaviors, and further undermine psychological health.

=== Low self-esteem and anxiety ===
Low self-esteem, a lack of self-confidence and negative self-image, can result from smartphone overuse, and is related to anxiety caused by the fear of missing out. Problematic smartphone use can also affect competence and positivity quality of life latent factors, particularly the "unaware use" mode of using smartphones, namely "its use in conjunction with other activities or late at night".

Studies with teens have consistently shown that there are significant relationships between high extroversion, high anxiety, low self-esteem, and mobile phone usage. The stronger the young person's mobile phone addiction, the more likely that individual is to have high mobile phone call time, receive excessive calls, and receive excessive text messages.

People suffering from anxiety are more likely to perceive normal life events as pressure, and attempts to reduce this stress can result in more addictive behaviors. Females are more likely to rely on mobile phones to maintain their social relations.

=== Narcissism ===
Another symptom of cell phone addiction is accumulating narcissistic character traits. Research has shown that personality plays a role in addictive cell phone use. Narcissistic personality disorder is commonly developed through the overuse of social media and people will portray character traits of high levels of self-importance, fantasies of unlimited success, feeling special and unique, lack of empathy, envy, and arrogance. However, studies have shown that some of these traits have been viewed as healthy because they provide an outlet for self-esteem and self-confidence.

== See also ==
- Behavioral modernity
- Computer addiction
- Continuous partial attention
- De Quervain syndrome
- Digital detox, a period of time during which a person refrains from using electronic connecting devices
- Digital media use and mental health
- Doomscrolling
- Evolutionary mismatch
- Instagram's impact on people
- Internet addiction disorder
- Mobile phone § Health effects
- Mobile phone radiation and health
- Nomophobia, a proposed name for the fear of being out of cellular phone contact
- NoPhone
- Screen-Free Week
- Smartphones and pedestrian safety
- Smartphone Free Childhood
- Social media addiction
- Television addiction
- Video game overuse
