= Forest High School =

Forest High School or The Forest High School may refer to:

- Forest High School (Florida), Ocala, Florida, United States
- Forest High School (Louisiana), Forest, Louisiana, United States
- Forest High School (Mississippi), Forest, Mississippi, United States
- The Forest High School, Cinderford, Gloucestershire, England
- The Forest High School (New South Wales), Sydney, New South Wales, Australia
- Forest High School, Kikandwa, Kassanda, Uganda

== See also ==
- Forest School (disambiguation)
- Carolina Forest High School, South Carolina
- Nathan Bedford Forrest High School (disambiguation)
