= The Forest =

The Forest may refer to:

== Places ==
- The Forest (Bannisdale), a summit in the English Lake District
- The Forest railway station, New South Wales, a disused Australian station
- Forest Café or The Forest, a cafe and social centre in Edinburgh, Scotland

== Film ==
- The Forest (1982 film), an American horror directed by Donald M. Jones
- The Forest (2002 film), a Portuguese film directed by Leonel Vieira
- The Forest (Australian film), a 2003 Australian film directed by Jo Kennedy
- Le silence de la forêt, also known as The Forest, a 2003 multilingual Central African Republican film
- The Forest (2005 film), a Cambodian horror directed by Heng Tola
- The Forest (2009 film), an Indian film directed by Ashvin Kumar
- The Forest (2016 American film), a horror film directed by Jason Zada
- The Forest (2016 Thai film), a supernatural drama directed by Paul Spurrier

== Other media ==
- The Forest (TV series), a 2017 French crime drama
- The Forest (album), 1991, by David Byrne
- The Forest (novel), 2000, by Edward Rutherfurd
- The Forest (play), 1871, by Alexander Ostrovsky
- The Forest (video game), a 2018 survival horror game

== See also ==
- Forest (disambiguation)
- Forest District (disambiguation)
