= Freedom (application) =

Cross-platform distraction-blocking software

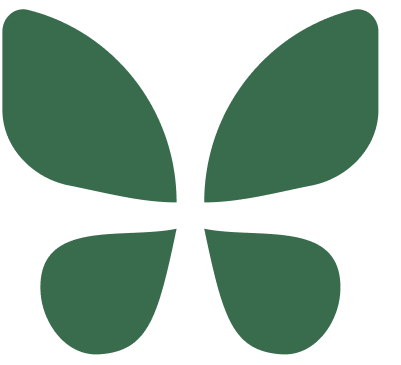
- Developers: Eighty Percent Solutions, Inc.
- Release: 2009
- Operating system: macOS, Windows, iOS, Android, ChromeOS
- Type: Productivity software
- License: Proprietary
- Website: freedom.to

Freedom (often referred to as the Freedom app) is an American cross-platform productivity application that blocks websites, apps, or the entire Internet across devices to reduce digital distraction. First released in 2009, it has been used to manage phone addiction, reduce doomscrolling, and sustain focus in professional and academic settings. It is frequently cited as a digital wellbeing tool and used in digital detox routines.

== Overview ==
Freedom enables users to create customizable blocklists of websites or apps and schedule sessions where internet access is restricted for a set duration. Its "Locked Mode" prevents sessions from ending prematurely, supporting behavioral commitment during work or study periods.

Sessions can be synchronized across user devices, including macOS, Windows, iOS, Android, and ChromeOS. Sessions can be scheduled to start automatically and run simultaneously across platforms.

The software was originally written by Fred Stutzman while he was a Ph.D. student at the University of North Carolina at Chapel Hill.

== Purpose and use ==
Freedom is intended to help improve attention and time management by limiting access to social media, news sites, and video platforms. Unlike passive tools such as silent mode or basic screen‑time features, it actively prevents access to specified content.

Common user groups include:

- Writers and researchers seeking distraction‑free sessions for long‑form work.
- Professionals and developers engaging in sustained “deep work.”
- Students managing study sessions and screen time.
- Individuals practicing digital detox or “monk mode” routines.

== Academic research ==
Studies have examined the effects of Freedom and similar applications:

- Productivity gains — A field experiment by Marotta and Acquisti at Carnegie Mellon University reported increases in task completion and focus duration with website blockers.
- Improved sustained attention — a 2025 study by Castelo, Kushlev, Ward, Esterman, and Reiner from University of Alberta and Georgetown University and published in PNAS Nexus used Freedom to block apps and websites on mobile devices, demonstrating significant gains in attention and well-being.
- Flow state and immersion — Research by Mark, Czerwinski, and Iqbal at Microsoft and the University of California, Irvine reported greater immersion and flow experiences among users of blocking tools.
- Design principles — A 2024 article in the International Journal of Human–Computer Interaction identified “undesign” features—limiting short‑term user agency to support long‑term focus goals—as central to the design of digital detox apps including Freedom.
- Cultural framing — A 2024 study introduced the concept of “disconnective media,” analyzing how Freedom commodifies temporary disconnection in contemporary work culture.

== Media coverage ==
Freedom has been covered in mainstream outlets as illustrative of public interest in limiting online distraction.

- An April 2026 Washington Post article titled "This detox may erase 10 years of social media brain damage, researchers say" discussed the study published in PNAS-Nexus which used Freedom to block internet access.
- A 2023 BBC article discussed Freedom within the “monk mode” trend and cited human rights lawyer Susie Alegre, who used it while writing Freedom to Think.
- New York Post reported associations between sustained use of blocking tools and reductions in doomscrolling or improvements in wellbeing.
- The New York Times recommended Freedom in a guide to reducing online distractions.
- Entrepreneur referenced Freedom as a tested method for improving work performance.

== Features ==
- Blocklists: user‑defined websites and apps to restrict
- Locked Mode: prevents premature session termination
- Cross‑device synchronization across macOS, Windows, iOS, Android, and ChromeOS
- Scheduling: one‑time or recurring automated sessions
- Offline Mode: disables all internet connectivity
- Focus Sounds: ambient audio to support concentration and deep work

== See also ==
- Time management
- Dopamine fasting
- Internet addiction disorder
- Attention economy
- Deep Work
- Digital detox
- Problematic smartphone use
