= Forest River =

Forest River may refer to:

- Forest River (company), a transportation company in Indiana, United States
- Forest River (North Dakota), a river in North Dakota, United States
- Forest River, North Dakota, a town

== See also ==
- Forrest River, a river in the Kimberley of Western Australia
- River Forest (disambiguation)
