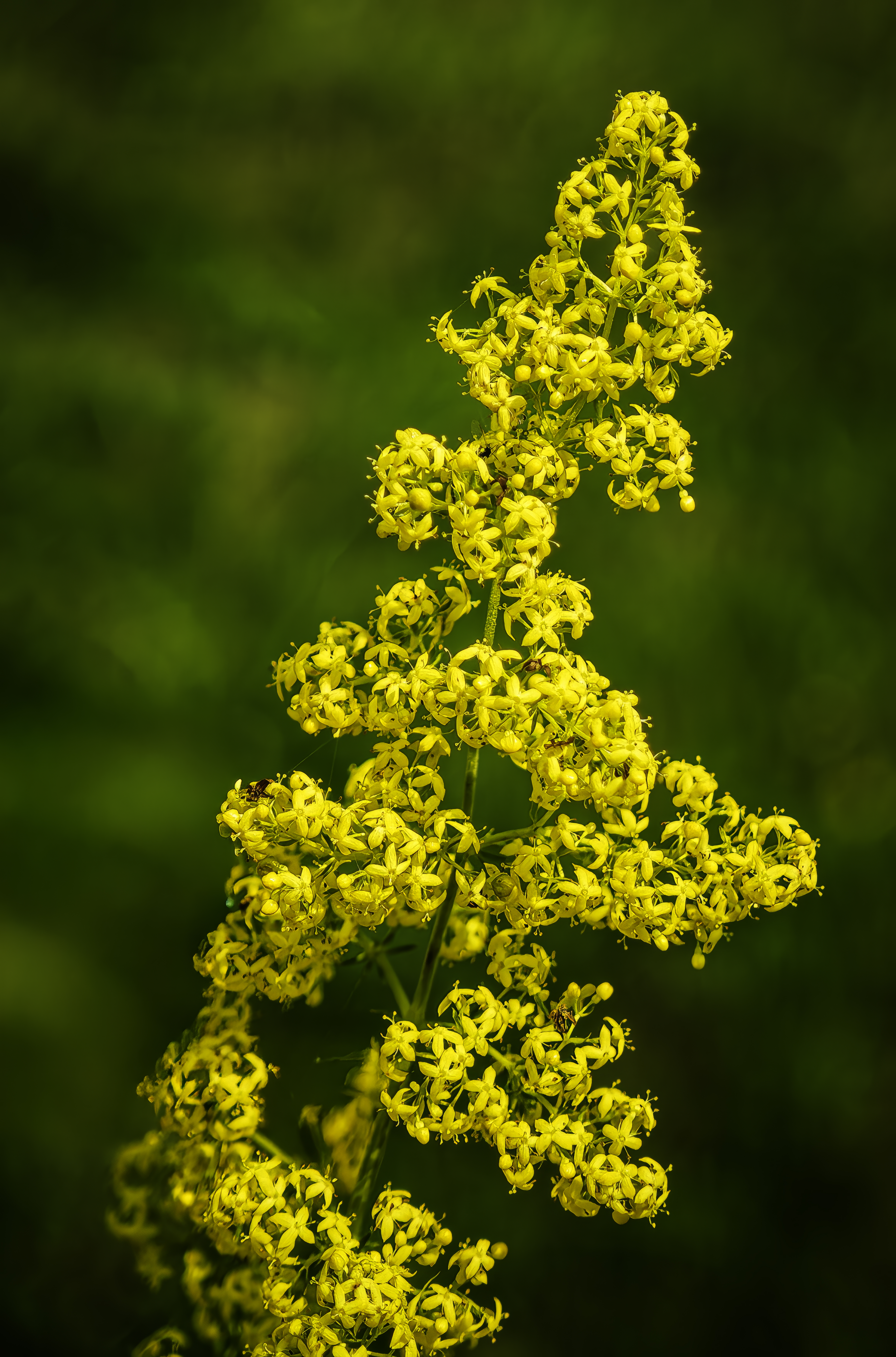

Scientific classification
- Kingdom: Plantae
- Clade: Embryophytes
- Clade: Tracheophytes
- Clade: Spermatophytes
- Clade: Angiosperms
- Clade: Eudicots
- Clade: Asterids
- Order: Gentianales
- Family: Rubiaceae
- Genus: Galium
- Species: G. verum

Binomial name
- Galium verum L.

= Galium verum =

Species of plant

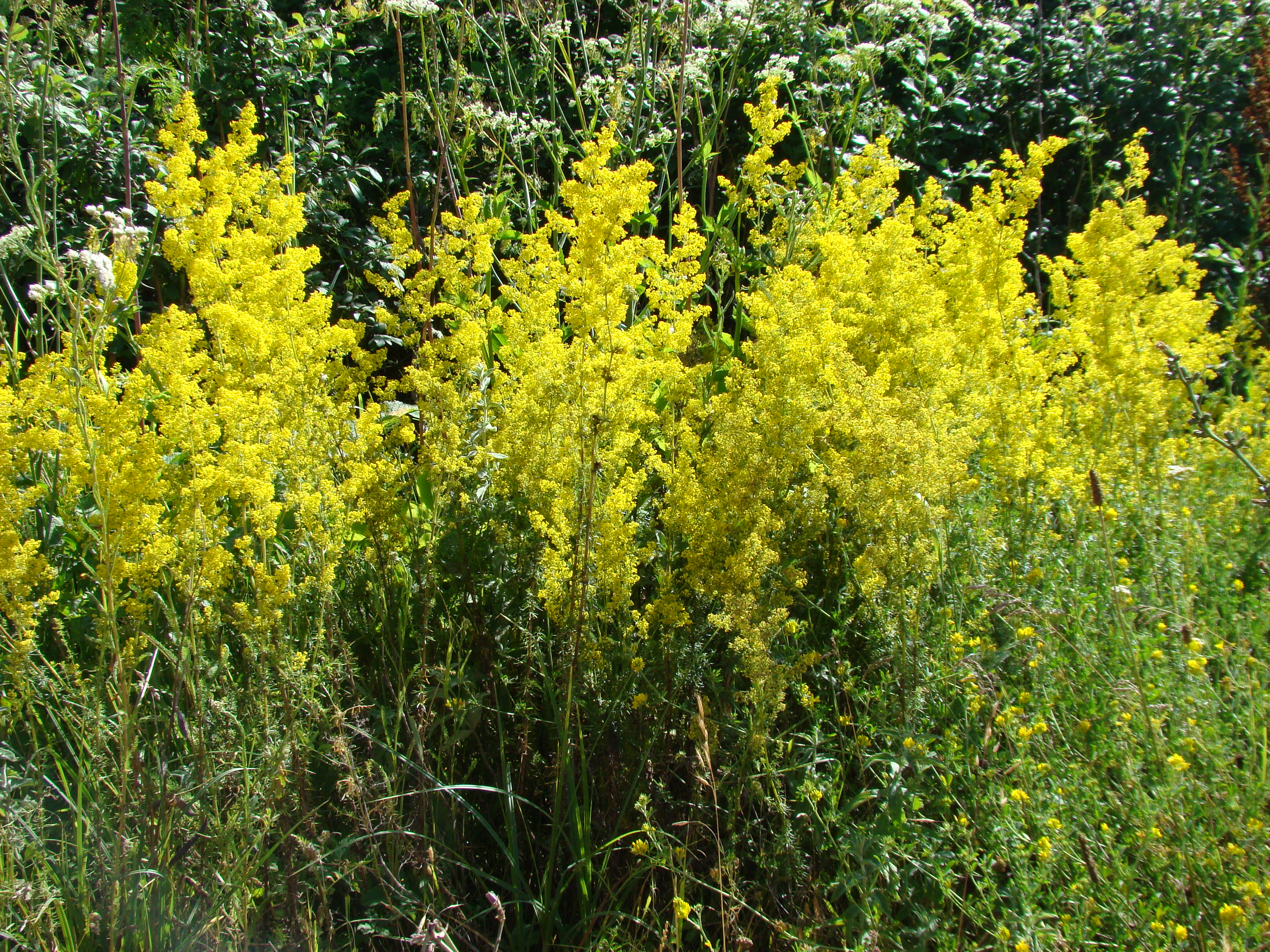
Yellow bedstraw (Sânziana galbenă) from the spontaneous flora of the Transylvanian Plateau

Galium verum (lady's bedstraw or yellow bedstraw) is a herbaceous perennial flowering plant in the family Rubiaceae. It is widespread across most of Europe, North Africa, and temperate Asia from Israel, Lebanon and Turkey to Japan and Kamchatka. It is naturalized in Tasmania, New Zealand, Canada, and the northern half of the United States.

Galium verum is an upright plant, with stiff stems growing to 15–120 centimetres (5.9–47.2 in) tall. The leaves are 1–3 cm (0.39–1.18 in) long and 2 millimetres (0.079 in) broad, shiny dark green, hairy underneath, borne in whorls of 8–12. The flowers are 2–3 mm (0.079–0.118 in) in diameter, yellow, and produced in dense clusters. This species is sometimes confused with Galium odoratum, a species with traditional culinary uses.

== Uses ==
In medieval Europe, the dried plants were used to stuff mattresses, as the coumarin scent of the plants acts as a flea repellant. The flowers were also used to coagulate milk in cheese manufacture (which gives the plant its name, from the Greek word γάλα, gala 'milk') and, in Gloucestershire, to colour the cheese double Gloucester. The plant is also used to make red madder-like and yellow dyes. In Denmark, the plant (known locally as gul snerre) is traditionally used to infuse spirits, making the uniquely Danish drink bjæsk.

== Mythology ==
Frigg was the goddess of married women, in Norse mythology. She helped women give birth to children, and as Scandinavians used the plant lady's bedstraw (Galium verum) as a sedative, they called it Frigg's grass.

In Romanian folklore, it is called sânziana and it is linked to the Sânziene fairies and their festival on June 24.

In Gaelic mythology, the hero Cú Chulainn, who suffered fits of rage during battle, would take a tea of this plant to calm his frenzy. The plant is known as lus chneas Chù-Chulainn 'the herb of Cú Chulainn's skin' in Scottish Gaelic, and in the 14th/15th centuries it occurred with the Irish name Bolad cneise con Culainn ‘the smell of Cú Chulainn’s skin’ (NLI G 11 182b2).

In Serbian folklore Ivanjski venci (Midsummer wreaths) are made out of Galium verum the day ahead of Nativity of John the Baptist celebration. Galium verum, decorated with other flowers, symbolize the beauty of nature and are placed at the public roadside front gates because they are believed to protect Christian homes.

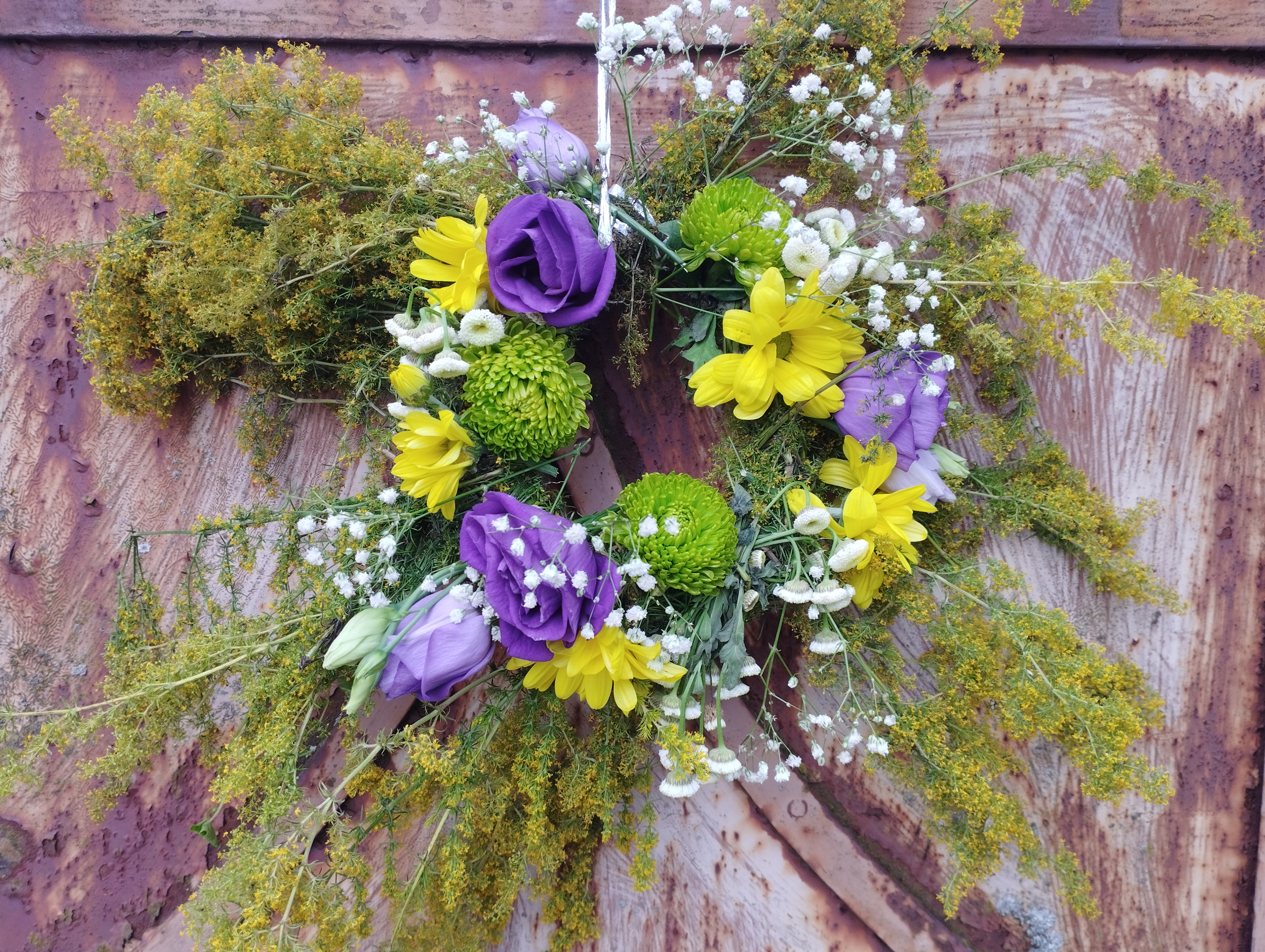
Ivanjski venac in Banovci

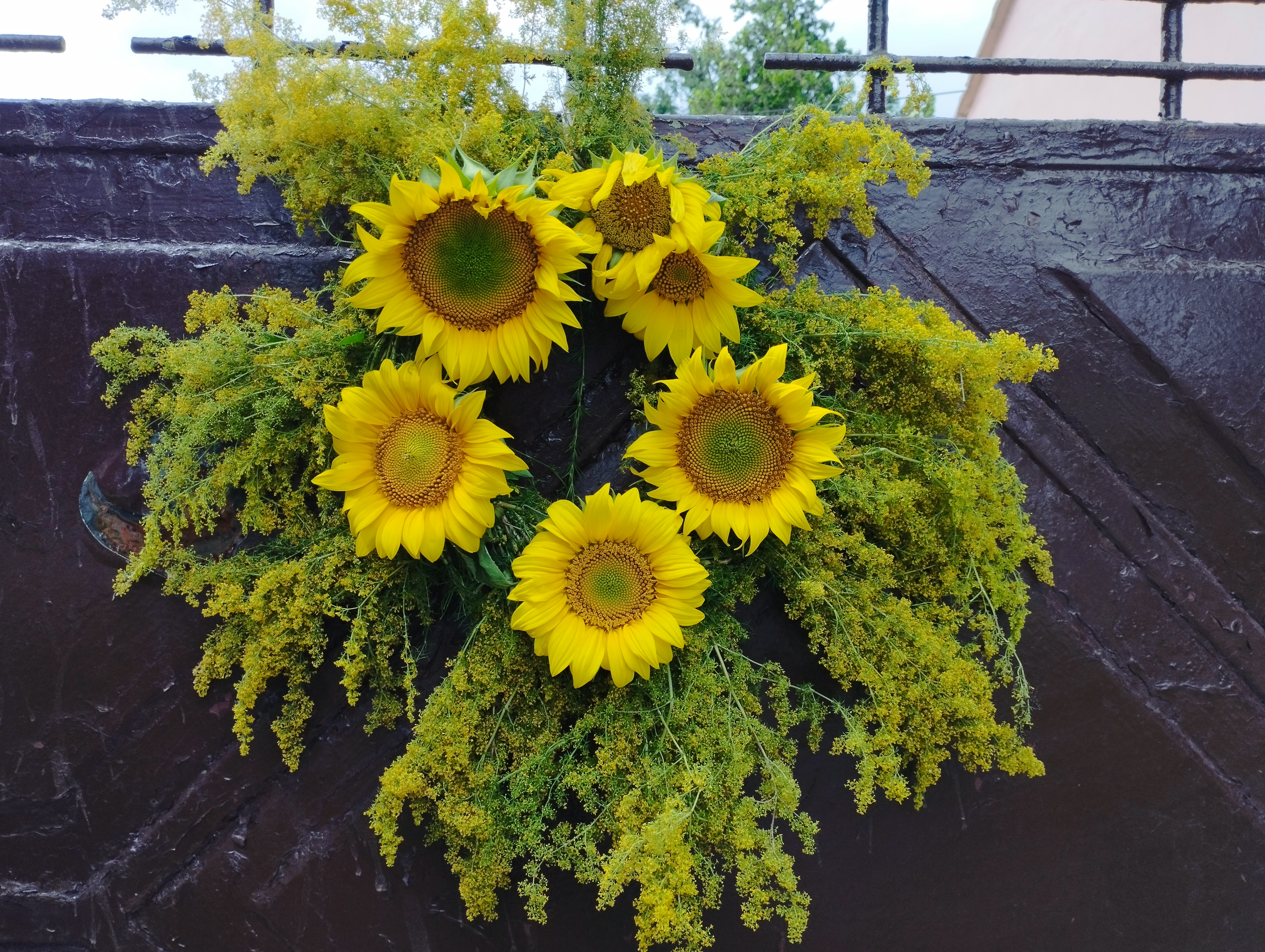
Ivanjski venac in Pačetin

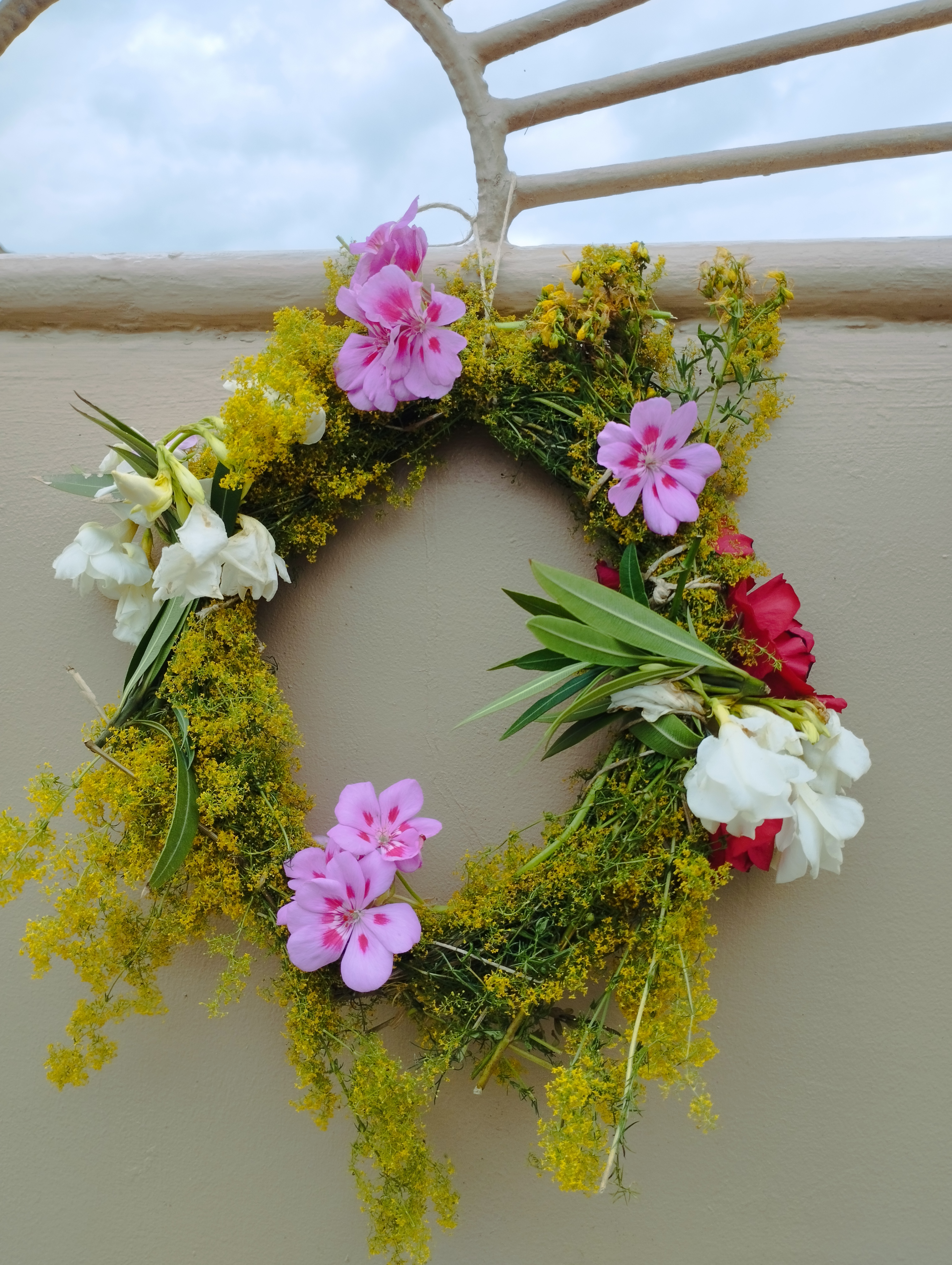
Ivanjski venac in Ostrovo

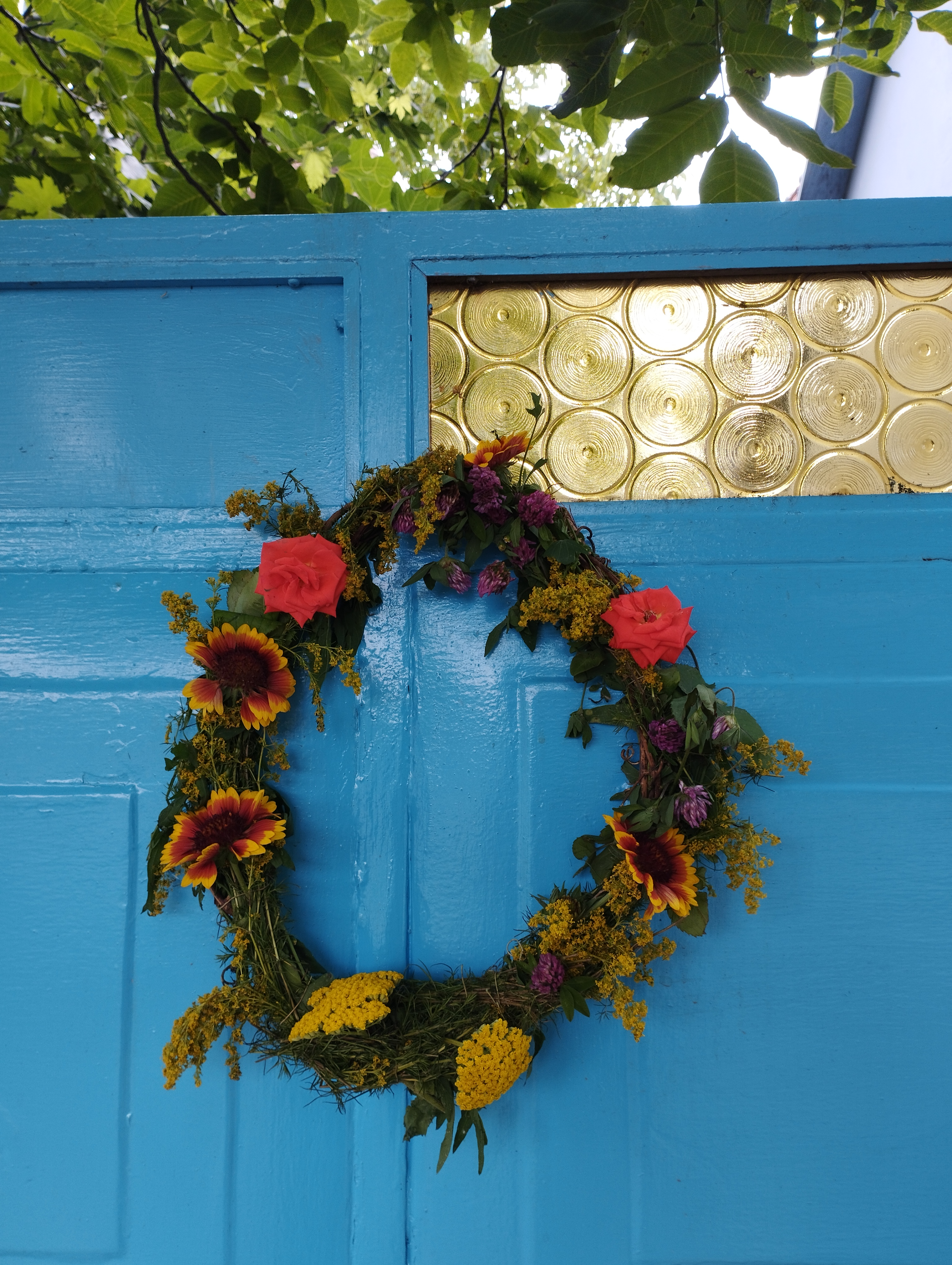
Ivanjski venac in Srijemske Laze

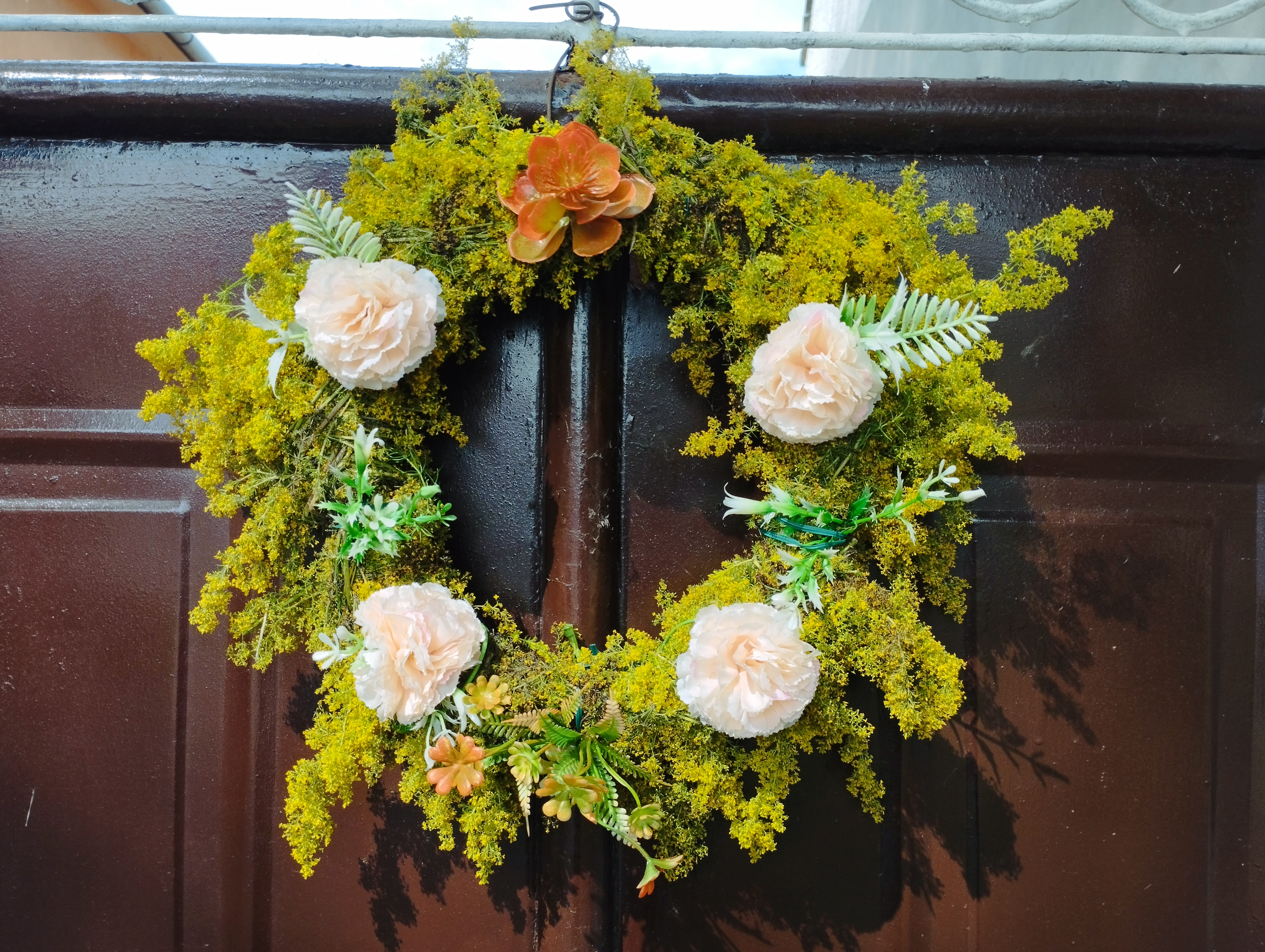
Ivanjski venac in Trpinja

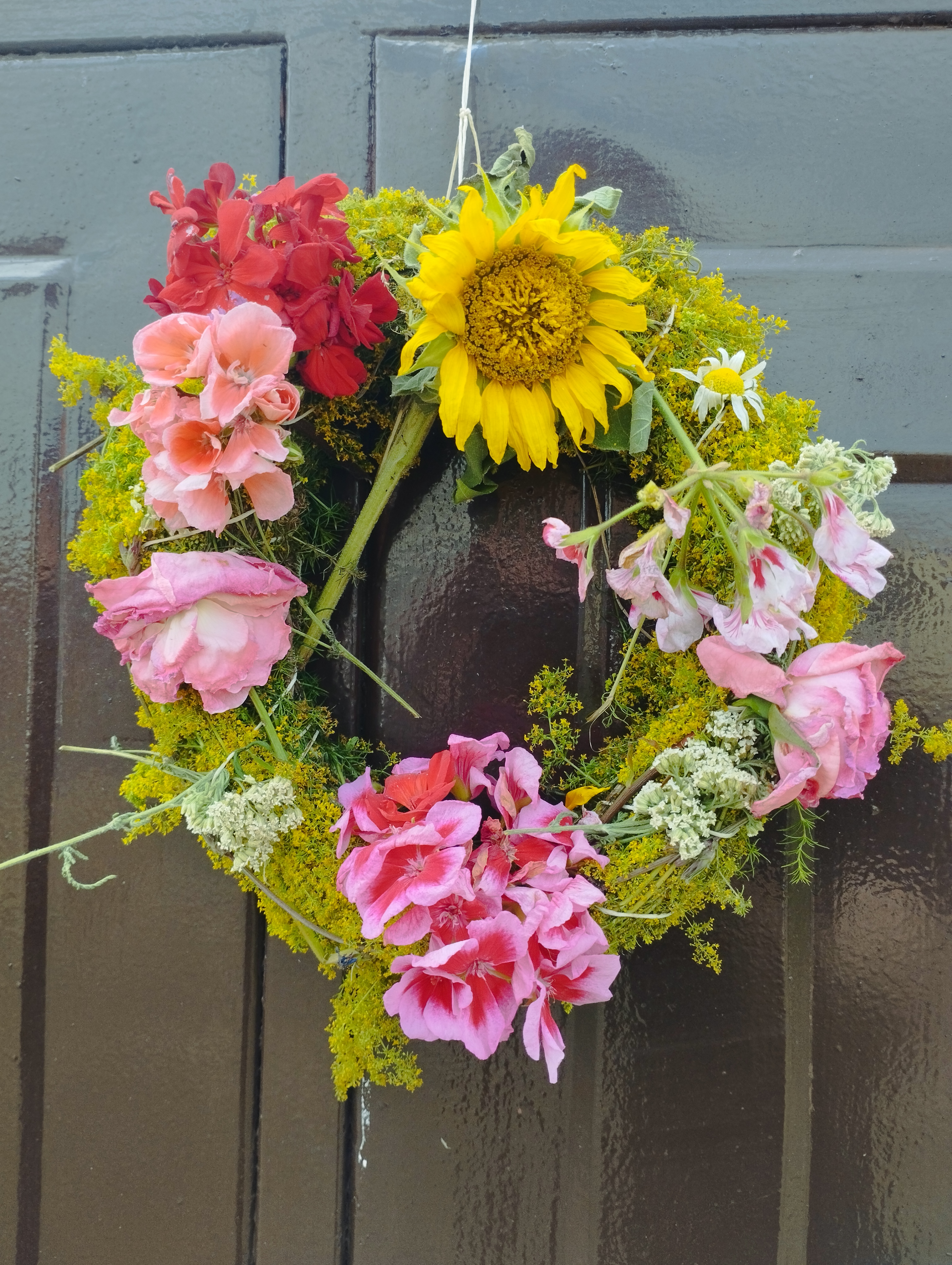
Ivanjski venac in Borovo

== Subspecies ==
Many varietal and subspecific names have been proposed, but only four are currently (May 2014) recognized:

- Galium verum subsp. asiaticum (Nakai) T.Yamaz - China, Korea, Japan, Russian Far East (Primorye)
- Galium verum subsp. glabrescens Ehrend. - Iran, Iraq, Turkey, Syria
- Galium verum subsp. verum - most of species range
- Galium verum subsp. wirtgenii (F.W.Schultz) Oborny - Central and eastern Europe plus Western Siberia

== Gallery ==
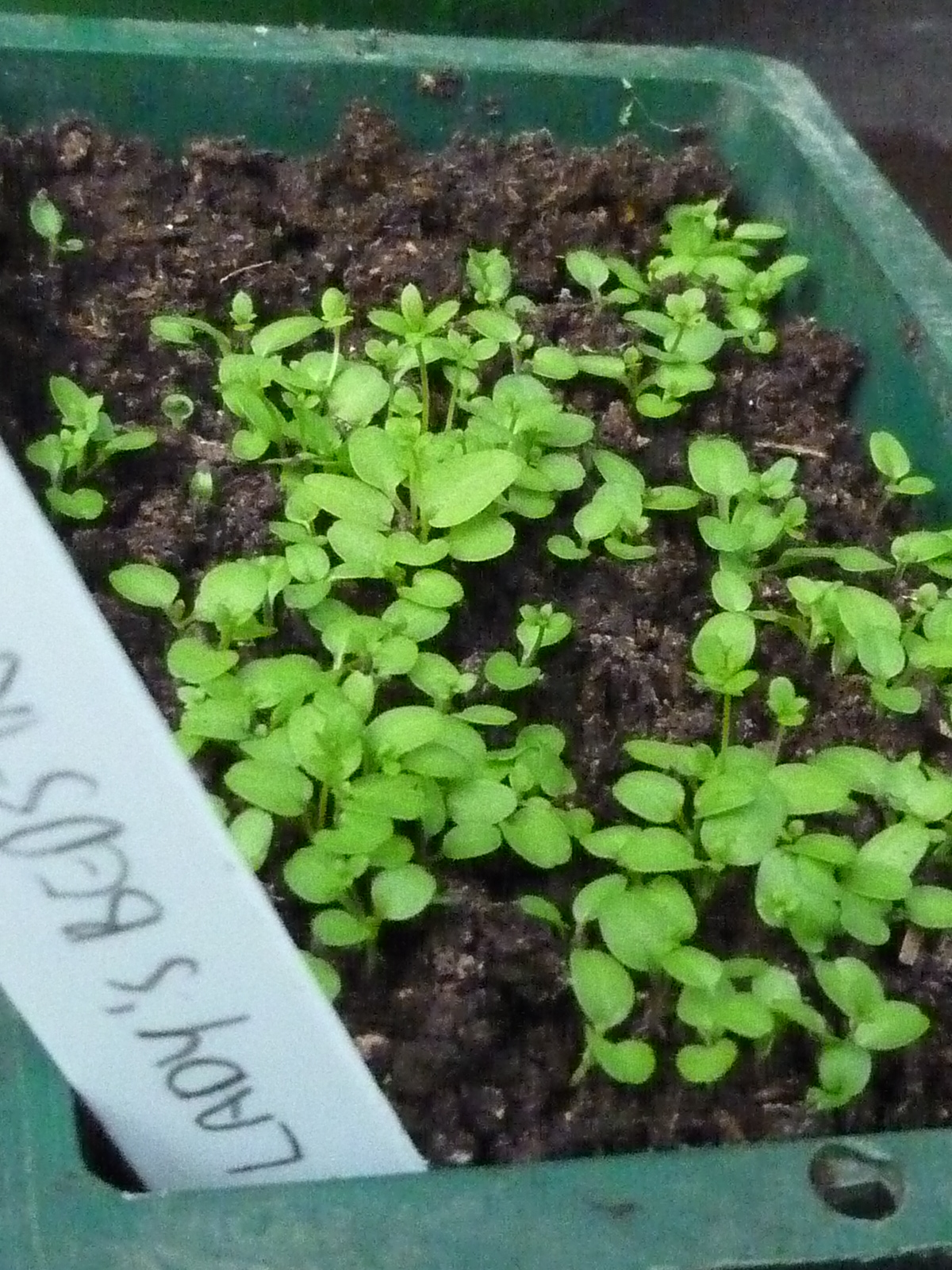
Seedling
