= Nathan Bedford Forrest High School =

Nathan Bedford Forrest High School may refer to:

- Forrest School (Chapel Hill, Tennessee), named for Nathan Bedford Forrest
- Nathan B. Forrest High School, former name of Westside High School in Jacksonville, Florida

== See also ==
- Forest High School (disambiguation)
