= Smartphone Free Childhood =

Non profit movement to delay smartphones

- Formation: February 2024; 2 years ago
- Founder: Joe Ryrie; Daisy Greenwell
- Members: 350,000 (self-reported)
- Website: Official website

Smartphone Free Childhood (SFC) is a UK-based organisation that advocates delaying children's access to smartphones, promoting device-free childhood until age 14 and exclusion from social media until age 16. Launched in early 2024 by Joe Ryrie and Daisy Greenwell,, the organisation promotes a "Parent Pact" for parents to vow to delay the use of smartphones for their children, which has been signed by more than 165,000 families. The organisation has chapters in 39 countries.

It is registered as a company limited by guarantee and, as of September 2026, is not registered as a charity in England nor Wales. The organisation is a client of Prism, a registered charity.

== History ==
The organisation was founded in February 2024, beginning as a WhatsApp group created by its founders. Initially called "Parents United for a Smartphone Free Childhood," the group aimed to connect families who wanted to delay smartphone use. After posting about the initiative on Instagram, it went viral in February 2024, being reposted by public figures such as Carrie Johnson, Emma Barnett, and Sophie Winkleman. Co-founder Daisy Greenwell claims that within weeks, local SFC WhatsApp groups had formed across all UK counties.

== Mission and Methods ==
SFC encourages parents to sign a voluntary pact pledging not to give their child a smartphone before the age of 14. The organisation provides a searchable directory of local SFC groups, templates for contacting schools and a network of trained speakers available to visit schools and community events.

The movement focuses on cultural change rather than legal regulation, emphasising collective action among parents and communities. Co-founder Joe Ryrie says that the organisation "[...] isn't an anti-tech movement, it's a pro-childhood movement. We're not saying no smartphones ever."

== Organisation ==
As of September 2026, SFC is not a registered charity. Legally it is composed of two entities: a "charitable fund" under Prism, and a company limited by guarantee. SFC claims that this arrangement reduces legal work while preserving acceptable legal status and infrastructure.

== Criticism ==
SFC has faced criticism from some experts, like Sonia Livingstone, a professor of social psychology at the London School of Economics, who argued it was important to recognise the practical uses of smartphones, such as using maps, doing homework and contacting parents.

== See also ==
- Digital detox
- Digital media use and mental health
- Parental controls
- Problematic smartphone use
- Problematic social media use
