= NoPhone =

Manufacturer of imitation phones

- Type: Privately held company
- Founded: October 14, 2014; 12 years ago
- Products: NoPhone Air, NoPhone Original, NoPhone Zero, NoPhone Selfie
- Website: www.thenophone.com

NoPhone is a company that manufactures a plastic object that resembles a smartphone. It was created as part of the backlash against smartphone addiction. The company manufactures four different types, the NoPhone, NoPhone Zero, NoPhone Air, and NoPhone Selfie. The solid bricks of plastic are marketed as being "completely toilet-bowl resistant." The NoPhone was created in 2014 by Van Gould, Ingmar Larsen, and Ben Langeveld. Larsen told ABC News:

"We wanted to make people aware of their addiction by creating a product that can be used for their addiction. It works as a placebo."

In 2016, the company pitched the product on the ABC TV program Shark Tank, but was unsuccessful.

The NoPhone was developed by The NoPhone Team from New York. Crowdfunding via the Kickstarter.com site was used to finance the project. The requirement was US$5,000; however, with the participation of 915 people, more than $18,000 was raised within a month.

== See also ==
- Brick
