= Forrestal =

Forrestal may refer to:

- Forrestal (surname), surname of Irish origin
- USS Forrestal, United States Navy aircraft carrier
- Forrestal Range, a mountain range in Antarctica
- James V. Forrestal Building, headquarters of the United States Department of Energy
- The James Forrestal Campus of Princeton University in Plainsboro Township, New Jersey
- Forrestal Village, a mixed-use development near Princeton, New Jersey
