= Zoo Băneasa =

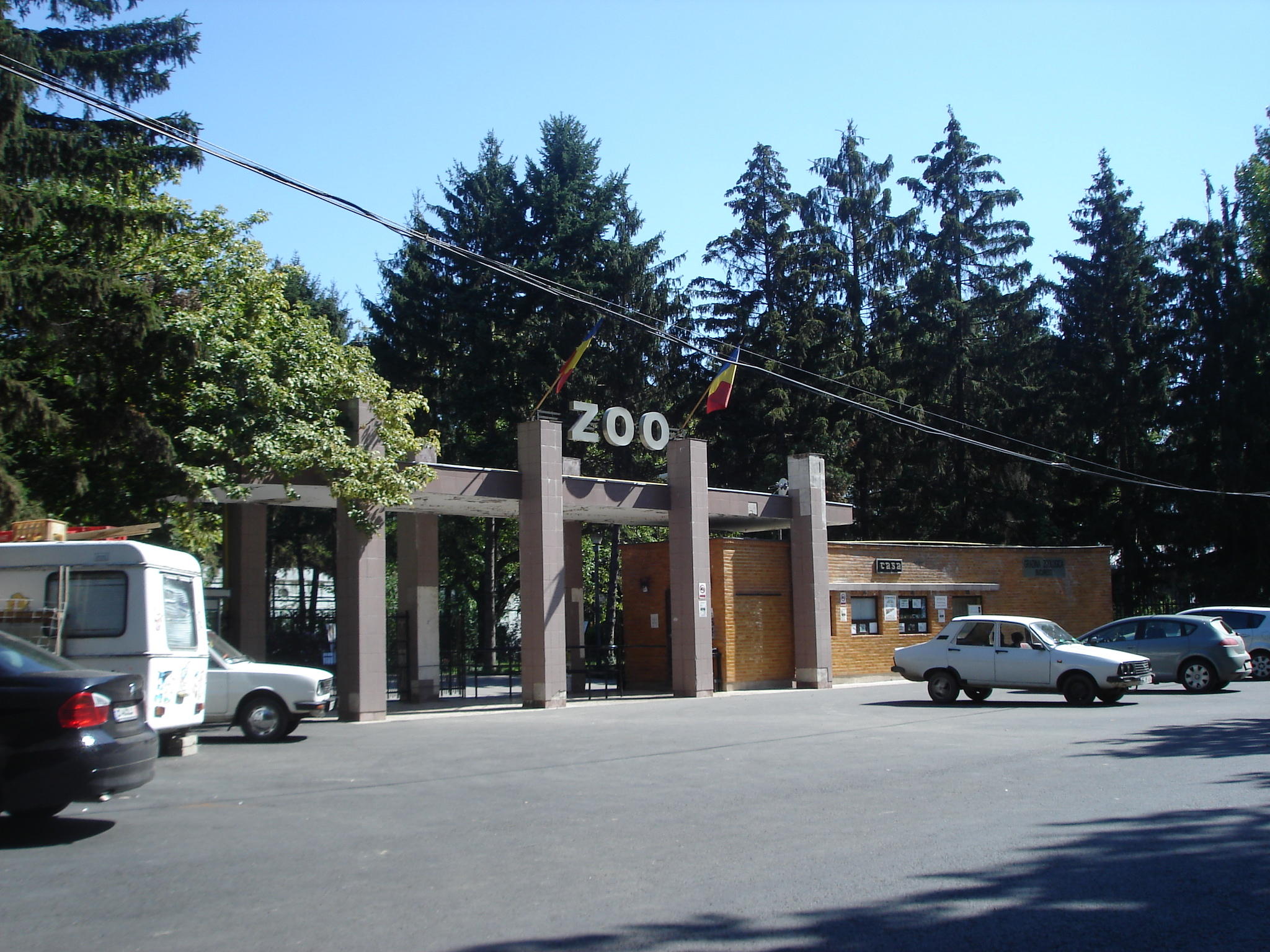
- Entrance to Zoo Băneasa (2008)
- Interactive map of Zoo Băneasa
- 44.51736°N 26.10390°E
- Date opened: 1955 (first visiting date May 1, 1959)
- Location: Bucharest, Romania
- Land area: 5.85 ha (14.5 acres)
- Website: http://www.zoobucuresti.com/

Zoo Băneasa is a zoo in Bucharest, Romania, located in the northern district of the city called Băneasa. The park was founded in 1955 as a service of the Municipal Household Section of the People's Council of the Capital.

At that time, small livestock were spread in the parks of Cișmigiu, Carol I, and Herăstrău, and in Băneasa Forest.

Between 1955 and 1959 there was a progressive concentration of animals in the Băneasa Zoological Corner, where on 1 May 1959 the first visiting season was opened.

In 1962, the title of the institution became the Bucharest Zoo, and in the same year it was included in the International Yearbook of Zoological Gardens (International Zoo Yearbook, edited by the Society of Zoology, in London).

The Zoo, with a total area of 5.85 ha (14.5 acres), is a public facility that maintains and exposes live, wild, indigenous, and exotic collections of animals to achieve two main goals: preservation of fauna (with priority to endangered species), and training, education, and recreation of the visitor audience.
