= Lake Forest =

Lake Forest may refer to:

In communities:

- Lake Forest, California, in Orange County
- Lake Forest, Placer County, California
- Lake Forest, Florida
- Lake Forest, Illinois
- Lake Forest, Texas
- Lake Forest, a neighborhood of Louisville, Kentucky
- Lake Forest, a neighborhood of Bridgeport, Connecticut
- Lake Forest Park, Washington

In education:

- Lake Forest Academy (Lake Forest, Illinois)
- Lake Forest College (Lake Forest, Illinois)
- Lake Forest Elementary School, a school of the arts in Jacksonville, Florida

In transportation:

- Lake Forest station (Milwaukee District), a railroad station on the west side of Lake Forest, Illinois
- Lake Forest station (Union Pacific), a railroad station on the east side of Lake Forest, Illinois

== See also ==
- Forest Lake (disambiguation)
