= Forrestal (surname) =

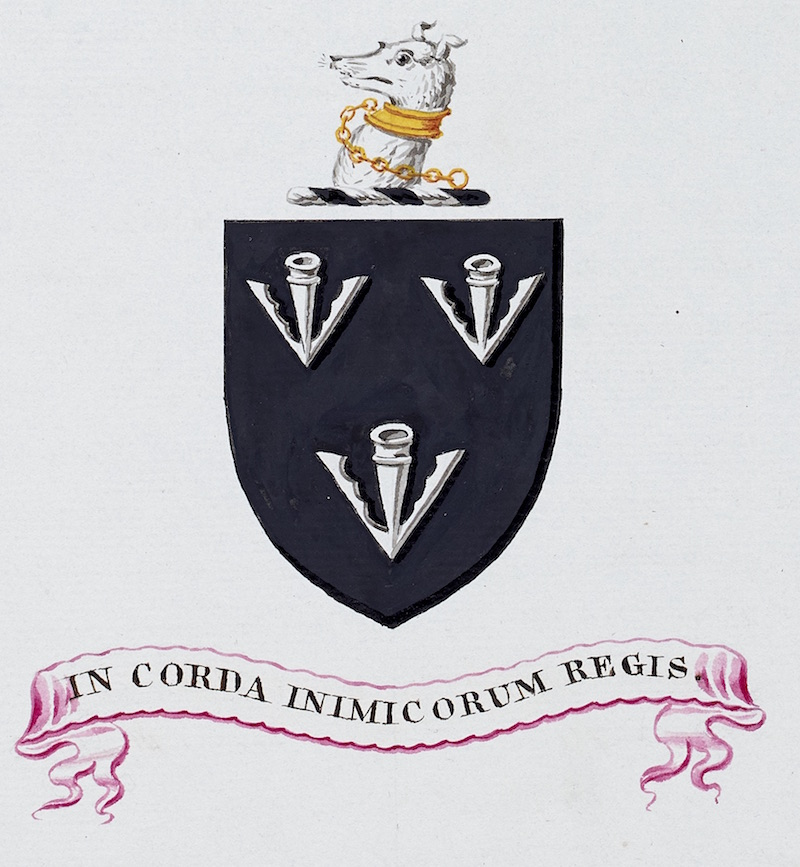
The Forrestal Irish Coat of Arms

Forrestal, Forristal, Forestell, or Forstall (Irish: Ó Fuireastal), is an ancient Irish surname from the southeast of Ireland, and still exists today primarily in the counties of Kilkenny, Wexford and Waterford. Settlement has also been established in Southampton England

== Alternate spellings ==
The name has been spelled in many different forms, all of which are related to the same family including; Forristal, Forrestal, Forristal, Forestal, Forrestall, Foristal, and in medieval times, Forstall (a name still used in present-day Louisiana). Forestell is a variation found in Canada. Also, in Gaelic Irish as Ó Fuireastal (pronounced Furristhawl), Mac Fuireastal, Mac Coillte, Ó Coillte, and Mac An Choill.

== History and ancestry ==
The Forstalls or Forrestals were present in Co. Kilkenny, Ireland, from at least the thirteenth century. The family held castles at Kilfera, Mullennahone, Forrestalstown, and Carrickcloney.

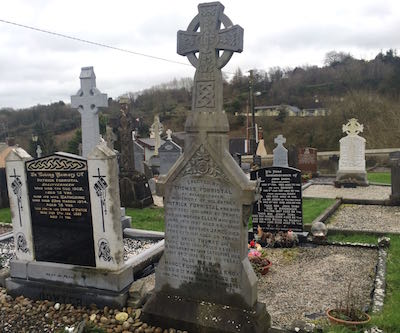
Celtic high crosses near Forrestalstown in Glenmore Parish, Co. Kilkenny, where many members of Forrestal family lived.

The family is listed in the medieval records of Kilkenny, Wexford, and Waterford. They are shown aligning themselves through marriage with the Catholic nobility of Ireland through marriage alliances with the FitzGeralds, Aylwards, Cantwells, O'Bolgers, Butlers of Ormond and O'Kennedys, which through these marriages they share common ancestors and bloodlines. Many of the modern day Forrestals descend from these noble unions.

The family motto, "In corda inimicorum regis", is likely taken from the Latin Vulgate's rendering of Psalm 45:5, and means "in the hearts of the king's enemies." In modern translation, the full verse is: "Let your sharp arrows pierce the hearts of the king's enemies; let the nations fall beneath your feet" (New International Version).

== People ==
- Elaine Forrestal (born 1941), Australian children's writer
- James Forrestal, (1892–1949), First United States Secretary of Defense
- Michael Forrestal, one of the leading aides to McGeorge Bundy, the national security adviser of President John F. Kennedy
- Laurence Forristal, (1931-2018) Irish Roman Catholic prelate who served as the Bishop of Ossory from 1981 to 2007.
- Desmond Forristal, Irish priest, writer and filmmaker.
- Scott Forstall, American software engineer, best known for leading the original software development team for the iPhone and iPad.
- Edmund J. Forstall, developer of the Forstall System in 1842 in Louisiana
- Michael Forrestall, Canadian Senator & Member of Parliament
- Roger Forstall Sweetman, Irish born Newfoundland Politician
- Tom Forrestall, (born 1936) Canadian realist painter
