= River Forest =

River Forest may refer to the following locations in the United States:

- River Forest, Illinois
  - River Forest station, a railroad station
- River Forest, Indiana
- River Forest, Missouri, a Kansas City neighborhood
