= Forest Preserve (disambiguation) =

A forest preserve is a type of nature reserve.

Forest Preserve may also refer to:

- Forest Preserve (New York), land owned by the state within the Adirondack and Catskill parks
- Forest Preserve District of Cook County, a governmental commission in Illinois
- Forest Preserve District of DuPage County, a governmental agency headquartered in Wheaton, Illinois
- Forest Preserve District of Will County, Illinois
- Forest Preserves of Cook County, Illinois

== See also ==
- Forest Glen Preserve, Vermilion County, Illinois
- Forest reserve (disambiguation)
