= Forest (painting) =

Painting by Paul Cézanne

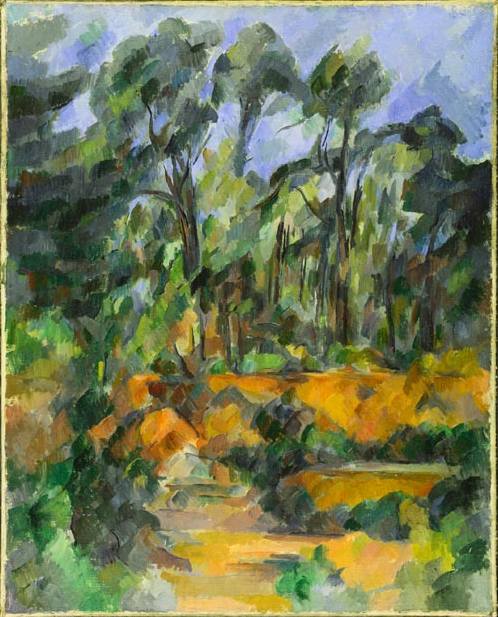
- Artist: Paul Cézanne
- Year: 1902–1904
- Medium: Oil on canvas
- Dimensions: 81.9 cm × 66 cm (32.2 in × 26 in)
- Location: National Gallery of Canada, Ottawa

Forest is an oil-on-canvas painting by French painter Paul Cézanne, which he created c. 1902–1904. It depicts the bank of a road in a wooded area close to Aix-en-Provence. It is housed in the National Gallery of Canada, in Ottawa.

== Description ==
Forest is a landscape painted in oils on canvas, which measures 81.9 cm x 66 cm. The location represented in the painting may be the entrance to the Château Noir, an estate that Cézanne frequented in order to paint. The composition employs warm, earthy colours to depict the red rocks in the centre of the painting. Towards the edges, Cézanne used cooler tones of grey and blue to depict the foliage and the sky. He also purposefully used looser brushstrokes and created patches of colour on the edges alongside bare canvas.

== See also ==
- List of paintings by Paul Cézanne
