= Forest County =

Forest County is the name of two counties in the United States:

- Forest County, Pennsylvania
- Forest County, Wisconsin

== See also ==
- Forrest County, Mississippi
