= Băneasa Forest =

Forest in Bucharest, Romania

Băneasa Forest Romanian: Pădurea Băneasa
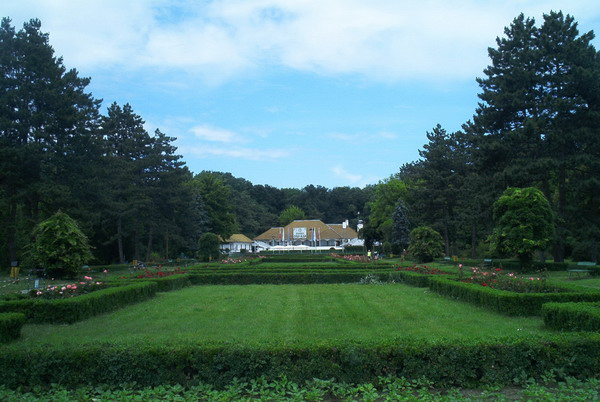

- Location within Romania
- Interactive map of Băneasa Forest

Geography
- Location: Municipality of Bucharest, Romania
- Coordinates: 44°31′51.2″N 26°04′54.5″E
- Area: 800 hectares (2,000 acres)

Băneasa Forest (Pădurea Băneasa in Romanian) is a wood in the north of Bucharest, Romania. Covering 800 hectares (2,000 acres), the ground is located in proximity to Băneasa neighborhood and Băneasa Airport. On its southern edge, there is the Zoo Băneasa zoological garden.

== History ==
After the Romanian Revolution of 1989 and the end of Romania's communist era, a large portion of the area was transferred from state property back to private persons, who had obtained judicial recognition of their family deeds. According to a 2007 estimate in Jurnalul Național newspaper, some 10,000 hectares had been reassigned through this process. As a consequence, Băneasa Forest also become a site for real-estate development, which was reportedly done at the limit of legality or against the law, and involved several Romanian public figures.

According to a 2008 report by Cotidianul newspaper, among the latter were businessmen-politicians Gigi Becali, Dan Voiculescu, and Sorin Pantiș. The same journal also claimed that the site was one of the locations at the center of another political scandal, allegedly involving former Mayor of Bucharest and later President Traian Băsescu alongside controversial real-estate developer Gabriel Popoviciu. Popoviciu had previously been accused of using land grants from the Agronomic Institute to consolidate his personal businesses.

Both Cotidianul and Jurnalul Național cited a private audit used as justification by developers, according to which the building of facilities in the forest had the positive effect of reducing noise pollution, and claimed that the firm in question had among its shareholders the former Environment Minister and Democratic Liberal politician Sulfina Barbu.

== In cultural reference ==
Băneasa Forest is assigned a central presence in Noaptea de Sânziene, a novel written after 1949 by Romanian author and researcher Mircea Eliade. Referred to as the "forbidden forest" in the English version of the book, it is a paranormal site, where the protagonist Ștefan finds escape from the suffering of the modern world. Andy Irvine has written a song "Băneasă's Green Glade", which he recorded in 1974 with Planxty on the album Cold Blow and the Rainy Night.

== Gallery ==
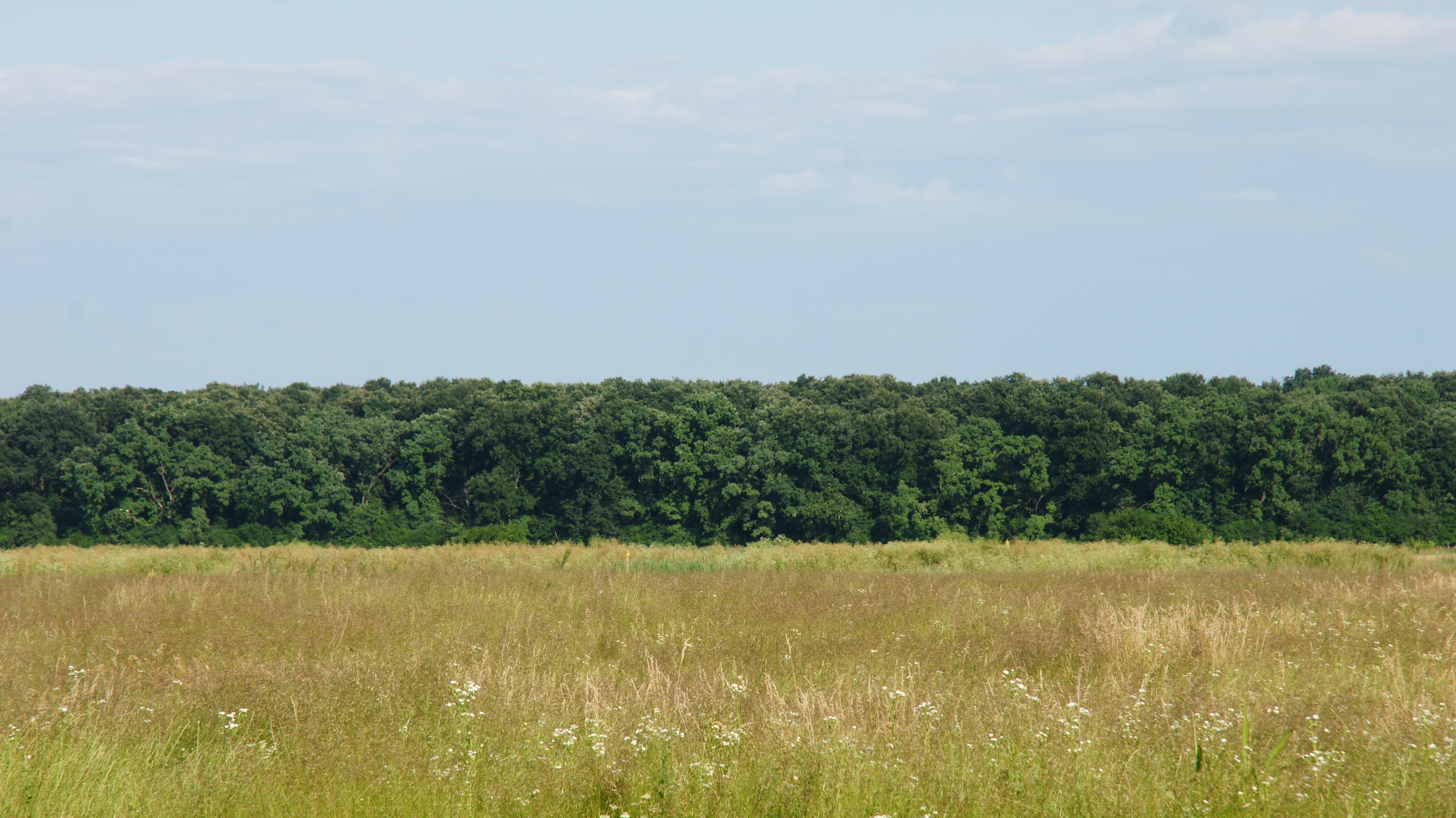
The Băneasa Forest

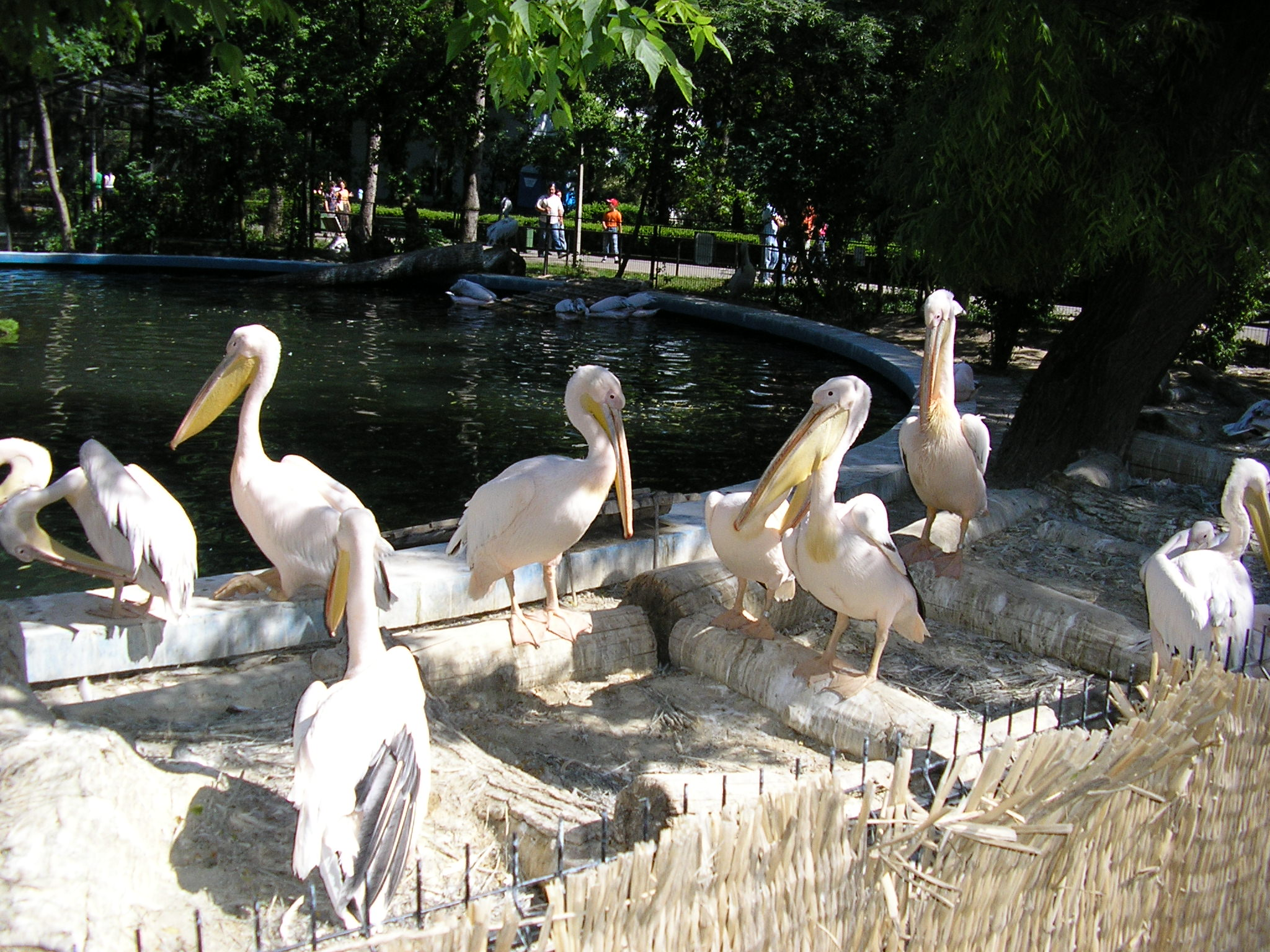
Zoo Băneasa
