= Lake Forest, Placer County, California =

Unincorporated community in California, United States

Lake Forest
- Unincorporated community
- Location in California Lake Forest (the United States)
- Coordinates: 39°11′04″N 120°06′53″W
- Country: United States
- State: California
- County: Placer County
- Elevation: 6,260 ft (1,908 m)

Lake Forest is an unincorporated community in Placer County, California. Lake Forest is located on Lake Tahoe, 6.25 miles (10.1 km) southwest of Kings Beach. It lies at an elevation of 6260 feet (1908 m).

The Lake Forest post office operated from 1947 to 1951.
