= Forestville =

Forestville is the name of several places:

== Australia ==
- Forestville, New South Wales, a suburb of Sydney
- Forestville, South Australia, a suburb of Adelaide

== Canada ==
- Forestville, Quebec

== United States ==
- Forestville, California
- Forestville, Connecticut, the southeastern portion of Bristol, Connecticut
- Forestville, Maryland
- Forestville, Michigan
- Forestville, Minnesota
- Forestville, New York
- Forestville, Ohio
- Forestville, Butler County, Pennsylvania, a census-designated place
- Forestville, Schuylkill County, Pennsylvania, a census-designated place
- Forestville, Jefferson County, Pennsylvania, a former small village in Jefferson County, Pennsylvania
- Forestville, Virginia
- Forestville (town), Wisconsin
  - Forestville, Wisconsin, a village
- Forestville Township, Fillmore County, Minnesota
