= The Forbidden Forest =

1955 novel by Mircea Eliade

- First French edition
- Author: Mircea Eliade
- Original title: Noapte de Sânziene
- Translator: Mac Linscott Ricketts; Mary Park Stevenson
- Language: Romanian
- Publisher: Éditions Gallimard
- Publication date: 22 September 1955
- Publication place: Romania
- English publication date: 1978
- Pages: 645

The Forbidden Forest (Romanian: Noaptea de Sânziene; French: Forêt interdite) is a 1955 novel by the Romanian writer Mircea Eliade. The story takes place between 1936 and 1948 in Bucharest and several other European cities, and follows a Romanian man who is on a spiritual quest while being torn between two women. The book was written between the years 1949 and 1954. It contains several elements and themes which also appear in the author's scholarly work, such as initiation rites and the division between sacred and profane time.

== Plot ==
Stefan Viziru lives in Bucharest and works for the Romanian state. He lives with his wife Ioana and also has a mistress, Ileana, whom he met at a Midsummer celebration. Stefan is torn between his affection for both women and is at the same time on a spiritual quest. He wishes to discover a sacred time which stands independently from the historical time and the destructive developments in contemporary Europe. Stefan befriends several people who influence him. A philosophy teacher argues that Stefan is searching for the paradise of his childhood. When Stefan tries to provide refuge for a member of the Iron Guard, he is put in a prison camp and temporarily loses his job. Ileana becomes engaged to an officer who dies in a car accident, after which she leaves Bucharest.

Stefan's wife Ioana and their son die in the bombings of Bucharest in 1944. Stefan realises that he loves Ileana and sets out to find her. He travels around Europe and goes through a lot of searching. Eventually he finds her, on Midsummer's eve of 1948 in a forest in France. As they leave the forest together they are killed in a car accident.

== Publication ==
The novel was first published by Éditions Gallimard in 1955 in a French translation by Alain Guillermou. The original Romanian version was published in 1971. An English translation by Mac Linscott Ricketts and Mary Park Stevenson was published in 1978 through University of Notre Dame Press.

== Reception ==
Eliade himself considered The Forbidden Forest to be his best work. It received little response from the academic world upon the initial publication, although the Swedish professor Stig Wikander wrote a positive review for Sydsvenska Dagbladet Snällposten. The novel received the Fantastic and Fantasy Award for best novel at Eurocon 1978 in Brussel.

Chronicles of Culture reviewed the book in 1980:

Both fiction and epic, The Forbidden Forest is an exceptional book about war and peace. Not unlike the Russian masterpiece bearing that title, Eliade's novel transcends the particulars of its subject matter—in this case, Romania at the outset of the Second World War—to explore the agonies of man's condition, his inevitable recourse to violence as he fails to understand others and, above all, himself.

== Adaptations ==
=== Music ===
- Romanian composer Serban Nichifor released the poem The Forbidden Forest – Homage to Mircea Eliade for piano (2021). The poem is based on the novel.

== See also ==
- Băneasa Forest
- Sânziană
