= Forrest Elementary School District =

School district in Arizona, United States

Forrest School District 81 is a school district in Cochise County, Arizona.
