= Băneasa =

District of Bucharest, Romania

Coordinates: 44°29′32.82″N 26°4′44.84″E

Băneasa on the map of Bucharest

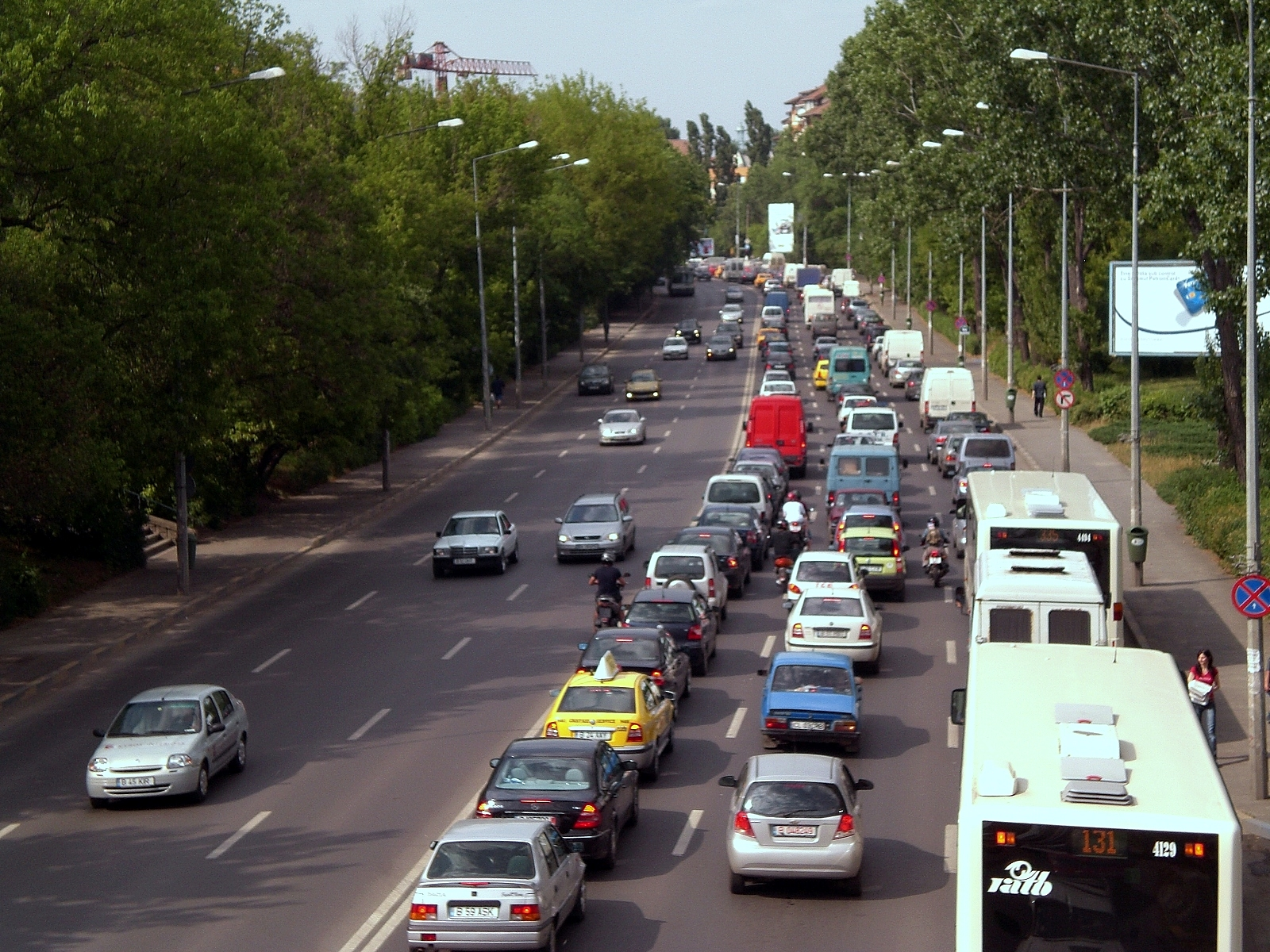
Traffic in Băneasa

Băneasa (Romanian pronunciation: [bəˈne̯asa]) is a borough (Romanian: cartier) on the north side of Bucharest, in Sector 1, near the Băneasa Lake, covering 0.45 km^{2} (0.17 sq mi). Like every north-side district of Bucharest, it is relatively sparsely populated, with large areas of parkland. Bordering on Băneasa Forest, Băneasa hosts the Aurel Vlaicu International Airport, used mainly by private jets and business aviation, and is home to Zoo Băneasa, the Băneasa railway station, the Băneasa Shopping City, and the Embassy of the United States.

In the 2000s, the area has become increasingly upmarket, due to the construction of various luxury apartment developments in and around it (as are those in the Pipera-Tunari area). It is also home to many villas constructed before the 1930s that were refurbished in the 1990s and 2000s.

Băneasa is linked by RATB bus lines to the Bucharest city center. An extension of the Bucharest Metro to Bucharest Otopeni International Airport via Băneasa is currently under construction, to serve this district and its increasing population.

The name of the village (and later of the Bucharest commune and neighborhood Băneasa) comes from the wife (băneasa) of Ban Mareș from the 17th century. The ban bought pieces of the Cârstienești estate (as the village was called then), and after his death, the property was enlarged by the widow.

== Significant buildings ==
- Institute for Research and Development for Plant Protection (ICDPP), former Royal Farm Băneasa, located in the Ion Ionescu de la Brad Boulevard.

== Natives ==
- Cristofi Cerchez (1872 – 1955), engineer and architect
