= Forest Township =

Forest Township may refer to:

- Forest Township, Clinton County, Indiana
- Forest Township, Winnebago County, Iowa
- Forest Township, Cheboygan County, Michigan
- Forest Township, Genesee County, Michigan
- Forest Township, Missaukee County, Michigan
- Forest Township, Becker County, Minnesota
- Forest Township, Rice County, Minnesota
- Forest Township, Holt County, Missouri
