= Forest (application) =

Productivity application

- Developers: Seekrtech Co., Ltd.
- Release: May 2014; 12 years ago
- Platform: iOS, iPadOS, Android, Chrome Web Store, Firefox Add-ons
- Available in: Multilingual
- Type: Productivity
- Website: forestapp.cc

Forest is a mobile productivity application developed by Seekrtech. The app uses gamification to discourage phone use during focus sessions: users plant a virtual tree at the start of a timed work or study period, and the tree withers if the user opens another application before the timer ends. Forest is available on iOS, iPadOS, and Android, and as browser extensions for Chrome and Firefox.

== Development ==
Forest was created by Marcus Pi and Amy Cheng and first released on iOS in May 2014. The app was designed to address phone-driven distraction through gamification rather than forced restriction, applying loss aversion as its core mechanism: a virtual tree dies if the user leaves the app, making the cost of distraction visible without removing user agency.

== Features ==
At the start of a session, users select a timer duration and a virtual tree species. The tree grows throughout the session and is added to the user's personal forest upon completion; leaving the app causes the tree to wither and die. Completed trees accumulate in a visual timeline that serves as a record of focus history. Sessions can be tagged by activity type, enabling users to review time distribution across different tasks.

Virtual coins earned through completed sessions can be spent to unlock additional tree species, soundscapes, and other in-app items, or to fund real-tree planting through the app's environmental partnership. A co-focus mode allows multiple users to plant trees simultaneously in a shared session.

Forest also offers Time Guard, a feature for blocking selected applications and tracking screen time usage, and Mindful Space, which provides soundscapes, breathing exercises, and gentle animations intended to support rest between focus sessions.

== Real-tree planting ==
Forest partners with Trees for the Future, a nonprofit organisation working in agroforestry across sub-Saharan Africa. Users may redeem virtual coins earned through focus sessions to fund the planting of real trees. Over two million real trees have been planted worldwide through the programme, according to records published by Trees for the Future.

== Business model ==
Forest launched in 2014 as a paid application. In December 2025, Seekrtech transitioned to a free download model supported by a Forest Plus subscription tier. Core features remain available without a subscription; Forest Plus subscribers receive additional tree species, enhanced coin rewards, and access to expanded features.

== Reception ==
Ashley Kemper from Common Sense Media gave Forest 4/5 stars, praising the app's "visual representation of time as a growing tree" as being "both creative and beautiful".

In May 2019, Nicole Gallucci from Mashable gave Forest a 4.5/5. Nicole praised the app for helping "users stay focused and unplug from their phones", but criticized the app's virtual coin awards for not being "very large unless you pay for in-app extras".
