= Forest District =

Forest District could refer to:

== Australia ==
- Forest District (Sydney)

== United Kingdom ==
- Epping Forest (district)
- New Forest (district)
- Wyre Forest (district)
- Forest of Dean (district)
- Forest District, a former London bus district

== United States ==
- Forest Preserve District of DuPage County
- Cook County Forest Preserves
- North Forest Independent School District
- Lake Forest School District
- Forest City Regional School District
- Forest Municipal School District
- Forest Grove School District (Oklahoma)
- Forest Grove School District (Oregon)
- Forest Hill Historic District (disambiguation)
- Forest Hills Local School District
