= Forest School =

Forest School may refer to:

== Education model ==
- Forest school (learning style) – a child-centred outdoor education approach that originated in Scandinavia in the 1950s.

== Religious philosophy ==
- Thai Forest Tradition – a Theravada Buddhist monastic movement in Thailand.
- Sri Lankan Forest Tradition – a Theravada Buddhist tradition in Sri Lanka.

== Schools ==
- Forest School, Walthamstow – an independent school in northeast London, England.
- Forest School, Horsham – a coeducational independent school in West Sussex, England.
- The Forest School, Winnersh – a secondary school in Berkshire, England.
