= Internet addiction in the United States =

Internet addiction in the United States, consisting of online gambling, social media, and video games addictions, has affected people in the United States. A study done by the California State University found that 10% of Americans are addicted to social media. Douglas Gentile, a psychologist at Iowa State University, showed that 8.5% of children in the United States who play video games are addicted to them.

== Background ==
A Pew Research Center survey found that 85% of American adults access the internet daily. Of that 85%, 35% answered they go "online almost constantly", 48% said they accessed the internet almost daily, and 6% stated they accessed the internet once a day.

A study published in JAMA found that half of the studied children had addictive behavior with their use of mobile phones. The study also found that children who said their internet usage was addictive were at higher risk of suicide.

== Online gambling ==
When online sportsbooks became available in Pennsylvania, internet searches for gambling addiction rose 61%. A survey by the Siena College Research Institute and the St. Bonaventure University’s Jandoli School of Communication found that 9% of surveyed Americans who have gambled online called a gambling hotline.

== Social media ==
A study done by the California State University found that around 10% of Americans are addicted to social media. There has been an association with children between frequent social media use, depression, and an increased risk of suicide. Evidence shows that female and LGBTQ children are more susceptible. According to Yale Medicine, some researchers believe that social media can overstimulate the brain's reward center and can trigger pathways similar to addiction.

77% of surveyed high school students reported using social media several times a day. Frequent social media use was more common with females than males, and frequent social media use was also more common with heterosexual students than gay students.

In 2023, United States Surgeon General Vivek Murthy published an advisory entitled "Social Media and Youth Mental Health", which warned about the harms of social media use with regard to children's mental health. In October 2025, New York City, New York and Oakland, California filed lawsuits against Meta Platforms, Alphabet, Snap, and ByteDance for their gross negligence and causing of a public nuisance with regard to social media addiction among children.

In March 2026, a ruling was made in the bellwether case, K.G.M. v. Meta et al. The jury found that Meta and YouTube were negligent “in a case that accused the companies of designing their apps to be addictive and harmful to teens”. Meta and YouTube’s parent company, Google, were ordered to pay $3 million in compensatory damages and $3 million in punitive damages to the plaintiff. In June 2026, Los Angeles Superior Court Judge Carolyn Kuhl denied the defendants’ post-trial motions, and both companies appealed the following month.

== Video games ==
Video game addiction is the inability to manage time gaming, giving gaming a higher priority than other interests and responsibilities, and constant gaming despite the negative consequences of such gaming over a year or longer. Research done by Douglas Gentile, a psychologist at Iowa State University, found that around 8.5% of children in the United States who play video games are addicted. Gentile states that what attracts people to video games is autonomy, belonging, and competence with them. While Mark Griffiths states that people get addicted to video games because of consistent rewards while playing the game.

Some developers use psychological tricks, such as creating a world that seems better than the real one, eliminating real-world consequences for failure, guaranteeing that players will be rewarded for their efforts, and giving players a sense of purpose, to make video games difficult to quit. William Siu, co-founder of Storm8, described how video game addiction was built into the design of many games to build player habits of playing the game.

=== Cases ===
In November 2001, 21-year-old Wisconsinite Shawn Woolley committed suicide; it has been inferred that his death was related to the popular computer game EverQuest. Woolley's mother said the suicide was due to a rejection or betrayal in the game from a character Woolley called "iluvyou".

Daniel Petric shot his parents because they took away his copy of Halo 3, resulting in his mother's death. In a sentencing hearing after Petric was found guilty of aggravated murder, the judge stated he believed that Petric didn't realize that the death of his parents after the murder would be permanent, in reference to his disconnection from reality, allegedly caused by playing violent video games. On 16 June 2009, Petric was sentenced to 23 years to life in prison.

In 2017, Virginia Beach gamer Brian "Poshybrid" Vigneault, also known by his alias of PoShYbRiD, died during a World of Tanks marathon livestream; Vigneault got up to smoke a cigarette 22 hours into the marathon and never returned. Vigneault had a record of chain-smoking and drinking during each session, which could have factored into his death.

A dispute between two gamers, Casey Viner and Shane Gaskill, over the video game Call of Duty: WWII led to a swatting on an uninvolved person, Andrew Finch, in December 2017. After Gaskill gave a false address, Viner then asked an anonymous online swatter to make the fraudulent call. Police responded, resulting in Finch being fatally shot.
