= Retail therapy =

Shopping to improve one's mood

Retail therapy or shopping therapy is shopping with the primary purpose of improving the buyer's mood or disposition. It occurs either due to people taking pleasure in shopping or during periods of depression or stress. Items purchased during periods of retail therapy are sometimes referred to as "comfort buys" (compare comfort food). Making shopping decisions can restore a sense of personal control over one's environment, alleviating feelings of helplessness or emotional distress. The purchases, therefore, act as a coping mechanism for this perceived lack of control as they may be able to restore feelings of agency and empowerment. People use shopping to express, manage, and communicate emotions, both to themselves and to others.

The name retail therapy is ironic and semifacetious, acknowledging that shopping hardly qualifies as true therapy in the medical or psychotherapeutic sense. It was first used by Mary Schmich in the 1980s, with the first reference being this sentence in the Chicago Tribune of Christmas Eve 1986: "We've become a nation measuring out our lives in shopping bags and nursing our psychic ills through retail therapy."

== Psychological and behavioural aspects ==
=== Neurological drivers ===
Neuroscientific research shows that shopping triggers the release of dopamine in areas of the brain associated with reward, including the nucleus accumbens and the ventral tegmental area. When levels of dopamine decrease, individuals may experience a craving of their previous state, seeking out further rewarding behaviours and creating a positive feedback loop. The fact that shopping may provide a short time of comfort (relief from dysphoria), but also imposes costs and is subject to comedown and withdrawal, make it, like opioid use, either a therapy or an addiction, depending on whether each person uses it adaptively or maladaptively. Therefore there are two benefits of retail therapy: negative emotion reduction and positive emotion reinforcement. A research study in 2014 found that engaging in retail therapy can help reduce residual sadness and therefore can help with long-term depression.

Window shopping or dopamine-hit sites can offer some of the comforts of shopping. The advantage is that many items and many stores can be enjoyed without cost – far more than spending would allow. The disadvantage, of course, is that one cannot acquire or keep the items.

=== Gender differences ===
Female consumers have been found to be more influenced by ought appearance-related self-discrepancies (differences between how they see themselves and how they believe they should look), often shaped by moral or societal expectations. This can lead to avoidance motivation and emotion-focused coping, which in turn may drive retail therapy as a way to manage distress and regulate emotions. In contrast, although the results were nonsignificant, male consumers were found to respond more to ideal appearance self-discrepancies than female consumers (differences between their current appearance and their ideal appearance), triggering approach motivation and problem-focused coping. As a result, this leads to retail therapy being used as a means to actively improve appearance, often guided by utilitarian goals.

=== Personality traits and risk ===
A research study in 2017 found that individuals who shop to cope with negative emotions are more likely to become compulsive buyers and hoard fashion items, especially if they have certain personality traits like high self-esteem, narcissism or a negative disposition. However, those with a narcissistic authority-leadership personality were less likely to engage in compulsive buying despite engaging in retail therapy. Retail therapy thus exists on a spectrum with shopping addiction (compulsive buying disorder). Researchers at Melbourne University have advocated its classification as a psychological disorder called oniomania or compulsive shopping disorder.

=== Prevalence ===
In 2001, the European Union conducted a study finding that 33% of shoppers surveyed had "high level of addiction to rash or unnecessary consumption". This habit was causing debt problems for many. The same study also found that young Scottish people had the highest susceptibility to binge purchasing. A 2013 survey of 1000 American adults found that slightly more than half had engaged in retail therapy, with the practice being more common among women (63.9% of women and 39.8% of men); women were most likely to buy clothing, while men were most likely to buy food. Research from professors at Youngstown State University found similar results (64% of women vs. 40% of men), with relief from anxiety being the most common reason for retail therapy. In a 2023 study conducted by Deloitte with over 114,000 respondents, nearly 80% said that they had made at least one purchase in the previous month with the specific purpose to improve their mood. That was despite the fact that only 42% of respondents said that they could afford to make these purchases.

== Motivations ==
Retail therapy plays a role in emotional regulation strategies, influencing consumer behaviour. Rather than purely rational, needs-based decision-making, emotional drivers often fuel impulse buying, particularly during periods of psychological vulnerability when people seek immediate relief or a distraction from negative thinking. In a 2018 study, it was found that in-person shopping leads to more impulse buying than online shopping, with 40% of consumers overspending in physical stores compared to 25% online.

Rather than serving purely utilitarian purposes, consumer behaviour is often shaped by a blend of hedonic motives (pursuit of pleasure, excitement, novelty) and utilitarian motives (functional and economic benefits). Studies have shown that both hedonic and utilitarian impulses significantly drive impulse purchases. However, a study found that when individuals compulsively buy items, their motives are strongly linked to hedonic value.

Due to the readily accessible nature of digital marketplaces used for shopping, algorithms are able to use behavioural data-profiling to deliver hyper-personalised product suggestions. Research has shown that targeted social media ads trigger hedonic responses that significantly increase impulsive buying. Emerging studies are finding that individuals who are more susceptible to social media addiction are also prone to relying on retail therapy for emotional regulation.

== COVID-19 pandemic ==
The COVID-19 pandemic significantly altered consumer behaviour, particularly through the widespread enforcement of lockdowns. Many individuals experienced heightened emotional distress during this period. A 2020 study reported that lockdowns created a "panic situation", with widespread anxiety, stress, and depression arising from the loss of control over daily life.

With a lack of access to physical retail spaces, there was a shift to digital marketplaces. Consumers who may not have previously relied on online shopping became increasingly dependent on digital platforms, not only for essentials but also for comfort purchases. For many, shopping during the pandemic served multiple psychological functions. A study in 2021 found that beyond practical needs, retail therapy offered temporary mood enhancement, enjoyment, an alternate form of social connection, and most importantly, a restored sense of control. The study suggested that consumers were not only buying products for their utility or aesthetic value, but also as a way to fulfil social and emotional needs that were otherwise unmet due to physical isolation. Online shopping restored a sense of personal autonomy.

A study among Korean consumers in 2023 showed an increase in luxury consumption during the pandemic. The study found that purchases of high-end products were not merely indulgent acts but functioned as strategic emotional coping mechanisms. They found that the consumption of luxury goods functioned as an adaptive psychological measure, helping individuals cope with the emotional impact of the global health crisis by providing a temporary escape.

The pandemic also produced a phenomenon referred to as "revenge consumption" or "revenge buying" where individuals over-consume and over-buy to compensate for periods of restricted activity. Rather than purchases being driven by functionality, revenge buying is characterised by purchases made for emotional gratification, symbolic expressions of freedom, and psychological compensation. Revenge consumption became a common coping mechanism, especially during or shortly after periods of strict lockdown, as people sought to counterbalance the deprivation and emotional fatigue they had experienced.

== See also ==
- Oniomania
- Buyer's remorse

== Other Sources ==
- Observer "Shopping can make you depressed" May 6 2001 Accessed 20 April 2006
- "Investigating retail therapy". The Age. December 5, 2004.
- CNN "How shopping makes you happy" July 17, 2013 Accessed 11 July 2018
