= Maressa Orzack =

American psychologist

Maressa Hecht Orzack
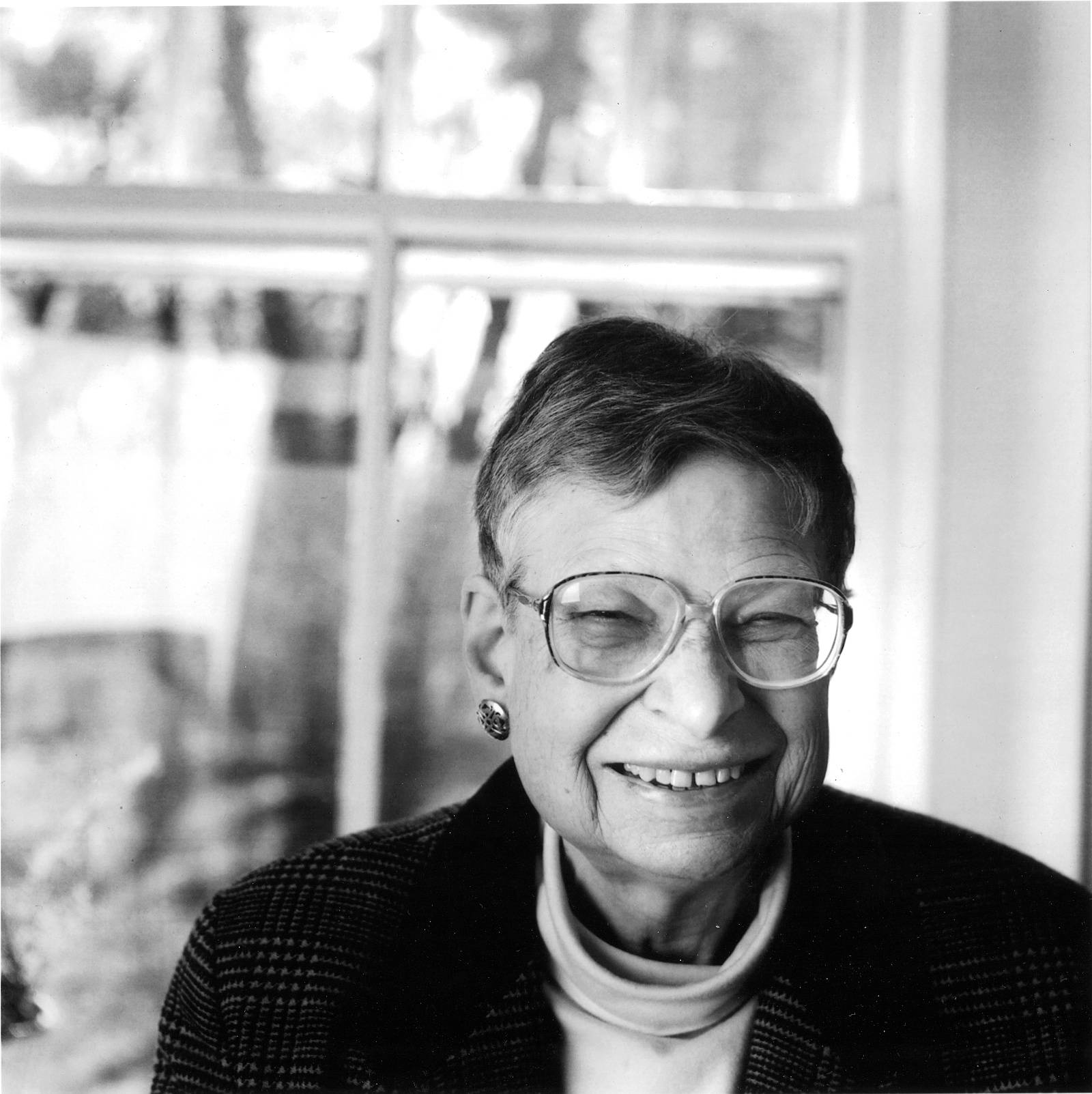
- Born: February 5, 1924; Boston, Massachusetts, U.S.
- Died: November 10, 2010 (aged 86); Mystic, Connecticut, U.S.
- Education: Columbia University
- Known for: Computer Addiction
- Scientific career
- Fields: Psychologist

Maressa Hecht Orzack (February 5, 1924 – November 10, 2010) was an American psychologist who was clinical associate in psychology at McLean Hospital; Coordinator of Behavior Therapy Affective Disease Program, also at McLean Hospital and assistant clinical professor of psychology, Department of Psychiatry at Harvard Medical School. She also held private practice at Newton Centre.

Orzack's research included various forms of computer addiction, including Internet addiction and computer game addiction. Recently, her research has focused on the addictive nature of MMORPG games.

== Career ==
Orzack studied at Columbia University, where she worked as an experimental psychologist. From there, in the late 1950s she worked with Agnes N. O'Connel on setting up a research arm at the Wisconsin Central Colony and Training School, under a job share arrangement. It is understood that her later work involved experience with impulse control disorders such as eating disorders and gambling addiction. Her research into computer addiction started at around 1994 while she was treating patients for gambling addiction and substance abuse at McLean Hospital. From discussions with her colleagues and patients referred to her, in 1996. Orzack went on to found and coordinate computer addiction services and a study centre at the hospital. When the clinic first opened Orzack would see at most two patients a week, but later expanded to dozens a week. After that time, Orzack expanded her research from online sex to computer gambling addiction, through to computer game addiction.

=== Computer addiction ===
Maressa Orzack became aware of the concept of computer addiction when trying to learn how to use a new item of software. Frustrated with her progress, she started playing a common computer version of the card game solitaire. After a time she started using the computer more for playing the card game than actual work. From her previous experience, she recognized that she was demonstrating addictive behaviors. Orzack listed several symptoms of computer addiction, including using the computer for pleasure and relief from stress, feeling out of control and depressed when not using it, neglecting real life responsibilities and failure in attempts to cut down usage.

Following from this, Orzack continued her research in this area and contacting other academics in this field. Reactions towards her beliefs were mixed, as some stating she was crazy, yet other scientists were also concerned about the issue. She compared computer addiction to other forms of addiction, such as gambling and alcohol addiction, and eating disorders.

=== Internet addiction ===
Continuing from her studies in computer addiction, Maressa Orzack moved on to look at internet addiction. In her research, she again likened the addiction to alcoholism, and through studies of cases of extreme internet addiction, learned the severity of the matter. Included in the cases she encountered was where a male who had become heavily addicted to the Internet, resulting in him quitting his graduate degree, leaving his wife and ignoring friends. Although she did not consider Internet addiction to be a recognizable disorder, Orzack felt that it could eventually be categorized as an impulse control disorder in a similar way to kleptomania, compulsive shopping and compulsive gambling. Orzack documented the effects of internet addiction, with withdrawal, loss of control, and compulsive behavior being some of them. She also described that one in ten people become addicted to the internet, with the figure being compared to that of gambling and alcohol addiction. Many of her patients were later referred to a psychiatrist for prescriptions for antidepressant and antianxiety medication. Orzack believed that treatment for internet addiction should be carried out without the aid of computers, and argued that computer-based treatment would be like "having an Alcoholics Anonymous meeting in a bar".

=== Computer gaming addiction ===
Following her work in internet addiction, Orzack returned to the area that originally started her research into addiction and started re-examining computer games. Orzack believes that the root of gaming addiction comes from the need of excitement in life, stating that "these people are avoiding their own problems. Some of them want excitement, some of them want relief". She also stated that the numbers of computer game addicts in the United States is high, although actual figures are unclear. Orzack felt that many of those she treated for computer game addiction were in their 40s or older, with them being almost exclusively male. She stated that she almost always heard of a case of this type after it has caused problems with someone's job or marriage.

=== Multiplayer game addiction ===
Orzack's continued research into computer game addiction started to focus on multiplayer computer games, such as The Sims, EverQuest and World of Warcraft. Describing one of her patients who was regularly missing college lessons and becoming violent, she said "Something is going on in his life that he is escaping. In the game, he finds a sense of belonging. Some say escape and some say fun, but most want to be part of an organization." Orzack then went on to say that these people are roleplaying and feel part of an organisation, something they may lack outside of the game. She also stated that some patients have been known to take drugs in order to continue playing, making her feel that the addiction is worse than that of drink or drugs. Withdrawal from gaming is not something Orzack recommended, as she felt this could lead to depression and violence.

On August 8, 2006, Orzack was quoted in an interview that she felt that over 40 percent of all World of Warcraft subscribers were addicted to the game. She went further by stating that she feels Blizzard Entertainment, the game's developer, structures the game to be deliberately addictive and designs it to keep people in. While she agreed that other personal issues can have an effect she felt that the cause of the problem was what she described as the game's "inherent addictiveness". Describing the addiction as similar to gambling, Orzack cited variable-ratio reinforcement as the mechanism that keeps people playing. Continuing, she added that she feels willpower or self control is not a factor, and that MMORPGs like World of Warcraft should carry warnings in a similar way to cigarettes. There was disagreement about Orzack's conclusions, with it being described a "ridiculous claim" that an addiction to an enjoyable activity and describe it a “serious mental disorder”. Other commentators were concerned that the term "addiction" was being used too frequently, and noting that at the time gaming and internet addiction were not included in the Diagnostic and Statistical Manual of Mental Disorders.

Orzack later described the 40 percent figure as an unscientific estimate, based on a group study of gamers called the Daedalus project and conducted by Nick Yee in California. She then went on to add that it may still be 40 percent who are addicted, but that she was willing to "cut back", concluding that "If you take over eight million people who play World of Warcraft, even if you cut it down to 10 to 15 per cent, that is a fair number of people".

Orzack died November 10, 2010, in Mystic, Connecticut, after a long illness.

== See also ==
- Impulse control disorder
- Computer addiction
- Video game addiction
- Internet addiction disorder
