= Mark Griffiths =

Mark Griffiths may refer to:

- Mark Griffiths (film director), Canadian screenwriter and film director
- Mark Griffiths (musician), British bassist
- Mark D. Griffiths, English psychologist
