= Problematic social media use =

Proposed medical diagnosis related to overuse of social media

- Other names: Social media addiction, social media obsession, social media overuse
- Specialty: Psychiatry, psychology
- Symptoms: Problematic smartphone use, internet addiction disorder
- Risk factors: Lower socioeconomic status, female sex
- Prevention: Parental engagement and support

Problematic social media use, or social media addiction as it is often referred to, is when an individual engages with social media platforms in a manner that is deemed unhealthy, maladaptive, and/or obsessive. Social media addiction is a commonly recognized social phenomenon in countries with internet access, particularly among younger generations who freely accessed the internet in their childhoods such as Millennials, Gen-Z and Gen-Alpha. However, due to the newness of social media platforms, not just as tools for online communication but as abstract forms of human expression and connection, it is generally unclear which behaviors should qualify as addictive. Therefore, it is not an officially recognized diagnosis in trusted sources of psychiatric information such as the DSM-5 (The Diagnostic and Statistical Manual of Mental Disorders, Fifth Edition).

Excessive use of social media can lead to problems including impaired functioning and a reduction in overall wellbeing, for both users and those around them. Such usage is associated with a risk of mental health problems, sleep problems, academic struggles, and daytime fatigue. Psychological or behavioural dependence on social media platforms can result in significant negative functions in peoples daily lives. The risk of problems is also related to the type of platform of social media or online community being used. People of different ages and genders may be affected in different ways by problematic social media use.

== Signs and symptoms ==
Some signs of social media addiction or excessive use of social media include many behaviours similar to substance use disorders, including mood modification, salience, tolerance, stress withdrawal symptoms, psychological distress, anxiety and depression, conflict, and relapse, and low self esteem. People with problematic social media habits are at risk of increasing their tolerance of social media usage, and may need it more as time goes on Frequent social media use may also be associated with self-reported symptoms of attention deficit hyperactivity disorder. A 2025 meta analysis of 15 studies involving 32,223 participants found a moderate association between problematic social media use and ADHD symptoms. However, these findings only demonstrate a correlation and is not used as evidence that problematic social media use can cause ADHD.

Social anxiety (or fear of missing out) is another potential symptom. Social anxiety is defined as having intense anxiety or fear of being judged, negatively evaluated, or rejected in a social or performance situation. The fear of missing out can contribute to excessive usage due to frequent checking the media constantly throughout the day to check in and see what others are doing instead of doing other activities. Common signs include displacement, or replacing meaningful other activities with social media, and loneliness.

== Causes and mechanisms ==
There are many theories for the mechanism or cause behind a person having problematic social media use. The transition from normal to problematic social media use occurs when a person relies on it to relieve stress, loneliness, depression, or provide continuous rewards.

1. Cognitive-behavioral model – People increase their use of social media when they are in unfamiliar environments or awkward situations;
2. Social skill model – People pull out their phones and use social media when they prefer virtual communication as opposed to face-to-face interactions because they lack self-presentation skills;
3. Socio-cognitive model – This person uses social media because they love the feeling of people liking and commenting on their photos and tagging them in pictures. They are attracted to the positive outcomes they receive on social media.

There are parallels to the gambling industry inherent to the design of various social media sites, with "'ludic loops' or repeated cycles of uncertainty, anticipation and feedback" potentially contributing to problematic social media use. Another factor directly facilitating the development of addiction to social media is the implicit attitude toward the IT artifact. Social media use may also stimulate the reward pathway in the brain. There is also a theory that social media addiction fulfills a basic evolutionary drives in the wake of mass urbanization worldwide. The basic psychological needs of "secure, predictable community life that evolved over millions of years" remain unchanged, leading some to find online communities to cope with the new individualized way of life in some modern societies.

The "Evolutionary Mismatch" hypothesis holds that modern digital platforms amplify social competition and comparison in ways our ancestors never faced, possibly triggering maladaptive patterns such as anxiety, depression, or compulsive use. Similarly, some scholars compare social media to "junk food": The approach taken to develop social media platforms may contribute to problematic social media use. The ability to scroll and stream content endlessly and how app developers distort time by affecting the 'flow' of content when scrolling, potentially resulting in the Zeigarnik effect (the human brain will continue to pursue an unfinished task until a satisfying closure. Autoplay modes, the personalized nature of the content results in emotional attachment (the user values this above its actual value, which is referred to as the endowment effect), and the exposure effect (repeated exposure to a distinct stimulus by the user can condition the user into an enhanced or improved attitude toward it). The interactive nature of the platforms, including the ability to "like" content has also been linked. Even though social media can satisfy personal communication needs, those who use it at higher rates are shown to have higher levels of psychological distress.

== Diagnosis ==
While there is no official diagnostic term or measurement, problematic social media use is conceptualized as a non-substance-related disorder, resulting in preoccupation and compulsion to engage excessively in social media platforms despite negative consequences. No diagnosis exists for problematic social media use in either the ICD-11 or DSM-5. Excessive use of an activity, like social media, does not directly equate with addiction. There are other factors that could lead to someone's social media addiction including personality traits and pre-existing tendencies. While the extent of social media use and addiction are positively correlated, it is erroneous to employ use (the degree to which one makes use of the site's features, the effort exerted during use sessions, access frequency, etc.) as a proxy for addiction. Indicators of a potential dependence on social media include:

1. Mood swings: a person uses social media to regulate his or her mood, or as a means of escaping real world conflicts.
2. Relevance: social media starts to dominate a person's thoughts at the expense of other activities.
3. Salience: social media becomes the most important part of someone's life.
4. Tolerance: a person increases their time spent on social media to experience previously associated feelings they had while using social media.
5. Withdrawal: when a person can not access social media their sleeping or eating habits change or signs of depression or anxiety can become present.
6. Conflicts in real life: when social media is used excessively, it can affect real-life relationships with family and friends.
7. Relapse: the tendency for previously affected individuals to revert to previous patterns of excessive social media use.

There have been several scales developed and validated that help to understand the issues regarding problematic social media use. There is not one single scale that is being used by all researchers.

== Treatment ==
The American Academy of Pediatrics recommends that families develop a media plan that sets boundaries around digital media use while protecting time for sleep, physical activity and family interaction.

Research has examined several approaches to managing problematic social media use.

- Self-management strategies, including monitoring use and setting limits for individual apps. Tools such as AppBlock allow users to block selected apps during scheduled periods.
- Cognitive behavioural therapy and related psychological approaches, including examining thoughts and feelings associated with social media use, keeping diaries and planning alternative offline activities.
- School-based and educational support, including teacher-led media-literacy lessons, guided group discussions and exercises to develop self-regulation skills.

Evidence on effectiveness remains limited. A 2023 systematic review of interventions in adults rated most included studies as methodologically weak, limiting conclusions about their effects on mental well-being.

== Prevention ==
Prevention approaches include screen time monitoring apps and other tech-based approaches to improve efficiency and decrease screen time and tools to help with addiction to online platform products. Parents' methods for monitoring, regulating, and understanding their children's social media use are referred to as parental mediation. Parental mediation strategies include active, restrictive, and co-using methods. Active mediation involves direct parent-child conversations that are intended to educate children on social media norms and safety, as well as the variety and purposes of online content. Restrictive mediation entails the implementation of rules, expectations, and limitations regarding children's social media use and interactions. Co-use is when parents jointly use social media alongside their children, and is most effective when parents are actively participating (like asking questions, making inquisitive/supportive comments) versus being passive about it.

Active mediation is the most common strategy used by parents, though the key to success for any mediation strategy is consistency/reliability. When parents reinforce rules inconsistently, have no mediation strategy, or use highly restrictive strategies for monitoring their children's social media use, there is an observable increase in children's aggressive behaviours. When parents openly express that they are supportive of their child's autonomy and provide clear, consistent rules for media use, problematic usage and aggression decreases. Knowing that consistent, autonomy-supportive mediation has more positive outcomes than inconsistent, controlling mediation, parents can consciously foster more direct, involved, and genuine dialogue with their children. This can help prevent or reduce problematic social media use in children and teenagers.

== Outcomes ==
=== Adolescents and teens ===
Increased social media use and exposure to social media platforms can lead to negative results and bullying over time. While social media's main intention is to share information and communicate with friends and family, there is more evidence pertaining to negative factors rather than positive ones. Social media use has been linked to an increased risk of depression and self harm. Those from the ages of 13-15 may struggle the most with these issues, but they can be seen in college students as well. According to the Center for Disease Control and Prevention's 2019 Youth Risk Behavior Surveillance System, data showed that approximately 15% of high school students were electronically bullied in the 12 months prior to the survey that students were asked to complete. Bullying on social media has caused suicide rates to increase among this age group within the last decade.

This is a cyberbullying policy proposal presented by students at Maine's Capital on May 11th 2012. The students presented ideas to the states capital legislatures and was sponsored a non-profit organization KIDS Consortium.

In the US, 31% of tested adolescents were found to have an increasing rate of problematic use for social media. Problematic social media use in these age groups is linked to high levels of depression, anxiety, suicidal thoughts, self-harm, and other addictive behaviors. Problematic social media use among teens and adolescents is expressed through behaviors such as, difficulty limiting use and neglecting other responsibilities rather than time spent online alone. In a clinical sample from Texas, teens and adolescents who spent five or more hours online reported higher levels of substance abuse, lower resilience in coping mechanisms, greater problems with pain and functioning, and difficulties functioning at school. One of the outcomes of the problematic social media use is Cybervictimization. Cybervictimization is defined as being the victim of online bullying. While can occur with adults, it is seen more strongly in adolescents and teens and is associated with suicidal behaviors and non-suicidal self-injury.

=== Older people ===
Older generations are affected by social media in different areas to teens and young adults. Social media plays an integral role in the daily lives of middle aged adults, especially in regards to their career and communication. Studies have suggested that many individuals feel that smartphones are vital for their career planning and success, but a pressure to connect with family and friends via social media becomes an issue. This is reinforced by further studies suggesting that middle aged people feel more isolated and lonely due to the use of social media, to the extent of diagnosis of anxiety and depression with excessive use. Similarly to teens and young adults, comparisons to others is often the reason for negative mental impacts amongst middle aged individuals. Surveys suggest that a pressure to perform and feelings of inferiority due to observing others lives through social media has caused depression and anxiety amongst middle class individuals specifically; however, older generations do reap the benefits of the rise of social media. The feelings of loneliness and isolation have decreased in elderly individuals who use social media to connect to others, ultimately leading to a more fulfilling and physically healthy lifestyle, due to the ability to communicate and stay in touch with people they would have physically not been able to see.

=== Education ===
Excessive use of social media may have the ability to impact academic performance negatively. An increase of social media usage could be taking time away from academics and changing the classroom setting. There may be a link between spending free time on social media and weaker critical thinking skills, impatience, and a lack in perseverance. There is also a risk of students struggling with attention and focusing because of how fast their phone can change from topic to topic. Social media also affects a person's attention span, causing the person's attention span to shrink. Social media is designed to grab and hold the user's attention, which can make it hard for the users to focus on anything else.

=== Eating disorders ===
People with excessive social media use have shown an increased risk for eating disorders and body dysmorphia. Through the use of social media, adolescents are exposed to images of bodies that are unattainable, especially with the growing presence of photo-editing apps that allow one to alter the way that a body appears in a photo. Social media can also foster an environment for online communities that promote unhealthy habits. Along with that, the higher prevalence of cosmetic surgery can distort the perception of what a typical body should look like. This can, in turn, influence both the diet and exercise practices of adolescents as they try to fit the standard that their social media consumption has set for them.

=== Non-Suicidal Self Injury and Suicidal Behavior ===
Suicide is classified as one of the leading causes of death worldwide by the World Health Organization (WHO). Self-harm is described as non-suicidal behaviors and activities that cause self-inflicted injuries to oneself. Non-suicidal self-injury (NSSI) is not classified as a form suicidal behavior. Both have distinguishing characteristics and have different treatment and prevention strategies. NSSI and suicidal behavior occur across all demographics but are seen the most in age groups 15-34 years old. The growing use of social networking sites also facilitates NSSI behavior in younger ages. NSSI prolifirates online and is now being referred to as “Digital Self-Harm” (DSH). This consists of sharing harmful or hurtful pictures and content of yourself online. Cases of DSH are increasing online and are being associated with suicide. People who engage in DSH often also engage in NSSI offline. Groups promoting DSH are emerging in Cutting and Eating Disorder (ED) communities online.

About 50% of adolescents with social networking accounts saw self-harm and suicide related content while online. Self-harm content on social media is seen as adjacent risk to self-injurious thoughts and behaviors (SITB) in teens and adolescents. Teens, adolescents, and adults that are being exposed to self-harm content on social media could have increased urges and behaviors associated with SITB. While viewing SITB content is associated with both NSSI and suicidal behavior people who post and create SITB content are more likely to engage in this outcome.

Research shows that the spread of online pro-suicide games and messages increase suicide and self-harm rates among youth. One study found the spread of an online prosuicide game, Blue Whale Challenge, had spread to over 127 countries with 95,555 posts and articles over a four-year period. Another study showed adolescents with a history of NSSI are impacted by negative social media experiences with increased urges to engage in NSSI, which in turn is, with increased stress and exposure to these negative experiences online.

Adolescents experiencing mental health issues will also go online to find others for support. Some of what they find is positive, but other have found negative advice and exposure to self-harming content to be triggering. While time online does play a role in exposure to self-harm and suicidal content, what is posted by teens is also linked to risks of NSSI and suicide.

== Prevalence ==
The prevalence rate of social media addiction is 24%, with a range from 0% to 82%. The prevalence estimates obtained in North America and Western/Northern Europe tended to be lower than those in Africa, Asia, and the Middle East. The prevalence is higher in collectivist nations (31%) than in individualist ones (14%).

== Cultural and history ==
From an anthropological lens, addiction to social media is a socially constructed concept that has been medicalized because this behavior does not align with behavior accepted by certain hegemonic social groups.

=== Molly Russell case ===
In November 2017, a fourteen-year-old British girl from Harrow, London, named Molly Russell, died by suicide after viewing negative, graphic, and descriptive content primarily on social media platforms such as Instagram and Pinterest. The coroner of this case, Andrew Walker also concluded that Russell's death was "an act of self harm suffering from depression and the negative effects of online content". Russell's case has sparked a lot of attention not only across the UK but in the U.S. as well. It raises the question on whether or not policies and regulations will either be set into place or changed to protect the safety of children on the Internet. Child safety campaigners hope that creating regulations will help to shift the fundamentals that are associated with social media platforms such as Instagram and Pinterest.

=== Laws, policies, and regulations to minimize harm ===
Molly Russell's case sparked discussion both in the UK and the U.S. on how to protect individuals from harmful online content. In the UK, the Online Safety Bill was officially introduced into Parliament in March 2022: the bill covers a range of possible dangerous content such as revenge porn, grooming, hate speech, or anything related to suicide. Overall, the bill will not only protect children from online content but talk about how they can deal with this content that may be illegal. It also covers verification roles and advertising as this will all be covered on the social media platform's terms and conditions page. If the social media platforms fail to comply with these new regulations, they will face a $7500 fine for each offense. When it comes to the U.S., recommendations were offered such as finding an independent agency to implement a system of regulations similar to the Online Safety Bill in the U.K.

Another potential idea was finding a specific rule making agency where the authority is strictly and solely focused on a digital regulator who is available 24/7. California already launched an act called the Age Appropriate Design Code Act in August 2022, which aims to protect children under the age of eighteen especially regarding privacy on the Internet. The overall hope and goal of these new laws, policies, and regulations set into place is to 1) ensure that a case such as Molly Russell's never happens again and 2) protects individuals from harmful online content that can lead to mental health problems such as suicide, depression, and self-harm. In 2022, a case was successfully litigated that implicated a social media platform in the suicide of a Canadian teenage girl named Amanda Todd who died by hanging. This was the first time that any social media platform was held liable for a user's actions.

=== KGM Case ===
In February 2026, in the case of K.G.M. v. Meta et al., a 20-year-old plaintiff identified as KGM testified in a Los Angeles trial that using YouTube from age 6 and Instagram from age 9 led to compulsive use that worsened her mental health, including depression and insecurity about her appearance. The case, a bellwether trial against Meta and Google, alleges the companies deliberately designed addictive platform features for young users, while the companies deny responsibility. Mark Zuckerberg (founder of Meta) and Adam Mosseri (CEO of Instagram) testified in the case. On March 25, 2026 the jury handed down a verdict in favor of the plaintiff against Meta and Google, finding that Meta and Google's YouTube intentionally built addictive platforms that harmed the plaintiff.

== Research ==
Empirical research indicates that addiction to social media is triggered by dispositional factors (such as personality, desires, and self-esteem), but specific socio-cultural and behavioural reinforcement factors remain to be investigated empirically. Social media addiction may also have other neurobiological risk factors; understanding this addiction is still being actively studied and researched, but there is some evidence that suggests a possible link between problematic social media use and neurobiological aspects.

== See also ==
- Adolescence (TV series) – 2025 crime drama TV series
- Algorithmic radicalization – Radicalization via social media algorithms
- Computer addiction – Excessive or compulsive use of computers
- Digital media use and mental health – Mental health effects of using digital media
- Dopamine fasting – Temporary abstinence from addictive technologies
- Dopamine-hit sites – Websites that simulate online behaviours without real-life consequences
- Evolutionary mismatch – Scientific concept in evolutionary biology
- Facebook–Cambridge Analytica data scandal – 2010s social media data misuse
- Facebook Files – Internal document leak
- Instagram impact on people
- Social media bias
- Problematic smartphone use – Psychological dependence on smartphones
- Social media as a news source – How people use social media to consume news
- Social influence bias – Herd behaviours in online social media
- Online Safety Amendment (Social Media Minimum Age) Act 2024 – Social media restrictions on children in Australia
- The Social Dilemma – 2020 American docudrama film by Jeff Orlowski
- Vicarious trauma after viewing media – Secondary trauma influenced by mediated communication
- Social media and psychology
