= Kimberly Young =

Psychologist

Kimberly Sue Young O’Mara
- Born: September 9, 1965; Buffalo, New York, U.S.
- Died: February 28, 2019 (aged 53); Lehigh Acres, Florida
- Scientific career
- Fields: Internet addiction disorder, clinical psychology
- Institutions: University of Pittsburgh at Bradford, St. Bonaventure University
- Website: www.netaddiction.com

Kimberly Sue Young O'Mara (September 9, 1965 – February 28, 2019) was a psychologist and expert on Internet addiction disorder and online behavior. She founded the Center for Internet Addiction in 1995 while she was a psychology professor at the University of Pittsburgh at Bradford. Until her death in 2019, Young was a professor of management at St. Bonaventure University. During her career, she published numerous journal articles and book chapters and served as an expert witness regarding her pioneer research including testimony for the Child Protection Online Act Congressional Committee. Young was a member of the American Psychological Association, the Pennsylvania Psychological Association, and a founding member of the International Society of Mental Health Online. Aged 53, Young died of cancer on February 28, 2019.

== Early life and education ==
Young was born September 9, 1965, in Buffalo, New York. She graduated with a degree in business administration from the University at Buffalo in 1988. She then studied clinical psychology at Indiana University of Pennsylvania, receiving her master's degree in 1992 and doctorate in 1994.

== Academic career ==
Young is most known for her work related to internet addiction, which is recognized by the American Psychological Association however is not listed in the Diagnostic and Statistical Manual of Mental Disorders. She began her career as a postdoctoral fellow at the University of Rochester Medical Center. She became an assistant professor of psychology at the University of Pittsburgh at Bradford in 1995 and remained there until 2002, when she joined the faculty at St. Bonaventure University as an associate professor of management. Young moved to the Jandoli School of Communication at SBU in 2006, where she directed the master's degree program in strategic leadership.

=== Center for Internet Addiction ===
While at Pitt-Bradford, Young founded the Center for Internet Addiction in 1995 and was one of the first researchers in the United States to study the disorder. When she moved to SBU in 2002, she continued her work as clinical director of the Center for Online Addiction. Young's interest in Internet addiction started when the Internet was proliferating in the 1990s, when a friend's husband was spending hundreds of dollars a month so he could participate in AOL chat rooms. At that time, many people in mainstream media were beginning to coin the phrase "online addicts" for those who spent large amounts of time on the Internet. Young identified that the United States lagged behind other nations in recognizing excessive Internet use as an addiction and was surprised at how few studies examined the phenomenon of Internet addiction. In 1998, Young devised an Internet Addiction Test (IAT) to assess symptoms of Internet addiction and compulsive behavior in adults.

=== Guidelines for Avoiding and Treating Internet Addiction ===
Young cautions against strictly measuring addiction to technology in terms of time, but by how disordered someone's life has become because of it. She suggests that digital addiction is similar to drug and alcohol addiction, and recent research shows digital devices can affect the brain the same way that cocaine and heroin does. Young believes that it is important for parents to establish household rules about internet use to help their children avoid internet addiction, since children as young as three years old can become addicted. She recommends the following guidelines:

- Birth – 3 years: Never
- 3 – 6 years: One hour a day/Supervised
- 6 – 9 years: Two hours a day
- 9 -- 12 years: Two hours a day/some independence on social media
- 12 – 18 years: Independence/Digital Diet

== Nonfiction work ==
Young published more than 40 articles on the impact of online abuse, and her work has been featured in media outlets such as The New York Times, CBS News, Fox News and The Times. Youngs most discussed work is perhaps her 1998 book Caught in the Net where she offers pragmatic solutions to peoples problems to what she calls "Internet addiction."

=== Books and book chapters ===
- Caught in the Net: How to Recognize Internet addiction and A Winning Strategy for Recovery. (1998)
- Evaluation and treatment of Internet Addiction (Chapter), in Innovations in Clinical Practice: A Source Book. (1999)
- Tangled in the Web: Understanding Cybersex from Fantasy to Addiction. (2001)
- Internet Addiction: The consequences of a new clinical phenomena (Chapter), in Psychology and the New Media. (2004)
- Controlling Internet Abuse in the Workplace: A Framework for Risk Management (Chapter), in Transformation of the Workplace: The Web and Work in the 21st Century. (2006)
- Breaking Free of the Web: Catholics and Internet Addiction. (2007)
- Internet Sex Addiction: Risk Factors, Stage, and Treatment (Chapter), in American Behavioural Scientist – Psychology and the New Media. (2008)
- Gamers Anonymous: Understanding and Treating Online Gaming Addiction. (2009)

== Fiction works ==
In addition to her non-fiction works, Young is the author of The Eighth Wonder, a novel about the romance between an ambitious college professor and an older man.

== See also ==
- Internet addiction in the United States
