= K.G.M. v. Meta et al. =

Bellwether legal case

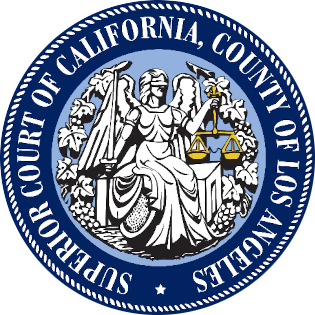
- Court: Los Angeles County Superior Court
- Full case name: P. F., et al. (K.G.M.) v. Meta Platforms, Inc., et al.
- Started: July 25, 2023
- Decided: March 25, 2026

Court membership
- Judge sitting: Carolyn Kuhl

K.G.M. v. Meta et al. was a bellwether legal case in which the plaintiff, known by the initials of their name, sued social media companies, such as Meta, which owns Instagram, and Google, which owns YouTube, for intentionally making their platforms addictive and so damaging her mental health. The case was heard in the Los Angeles County Superior Court starting in 2023. The jury found for the plaintiff in 2026, awarding $6 million in compensatory and punitive damages.

== Background ==
It was the first of three bellwether cases selected to test the law on problematic social media use in California. They were drawn from a pool of similar cases by a Judicial Council Coordinated Proceeding (JCCP 5255). Altogether, there are about 1,600 plaintiffs suing in California whose similar actions have been consolidated in this process.

More generally across the USA, there are numerous lawsuits pending of a similar nature – over 10,000 for individuals and almost 800 for school districts. A federal multidistrict litigation (MDL 3047) was consolidated in the Northern District of California and bellwether trials for that are expected to start in Oakland in June 2026. Over 40 state attorneys general have filed similar claims against Meta.

== Case ==
The plaintiff, Kaley Glenn-Mills (identified only by her first name and her initials, K.G.M., during the case), sued four social media companies in 2023, when she was seventeen. She had started using YouTube when she was six, Instagram when she was nine, Musical.ly (which later became TikTok) at age 10, and Snapchat at 11. She alleged that the companies had engineered their sites to make their users engage compulsively using techniques such as infinite scrolling, algorithmic recommendations, and automatic video play. These had caused her to suffer from anxiety, body dysmorphia, and depression. Mills was represented by W. Mark Lanier.

Meta denied the claims, attributing the plaintiff's mental health struggles to family turmoil. YouTube stated that it was not a social media company and that its features were not designed to be addictive.

Meta and Google applied for a summary judgment, asking for the case to be dismissed on various grounds. Judge Carolyn Kuhl ruled against them on November 5, 2025. The other defendants, Snap Inc. and TikTok, then settled out of court in December 2025. Mark Zuckerberg, founder of Meta, and Adam Mosseri, CEO of Instagram, testified in the case. On March 25, 2026, the jury handed down a verdict in favor of the plaintiff against Meta and Google. The companies were found negligent in the design of their apps, which led the plaintiff to her mental health issues. Compensatory damages of US$3 million were awarded, plus another $3 million as punitive damages, apportioning 70% of the payment to Meta and 30% to Google. The total of $6 million was split so that Meta is liable for $4.2 million and Google for $1.8 million. In June 2026, Judge Kuhl denied the defendants’ post-trial motions, and both companies appealed the following month.

== Reactions ==
Mike Masnick, editor of Techdirt, was highly critical of the ruling in the case, citing it as an example of the maxim "bad defendants make bad law". He noted that the decision to sue the platforms over what were cited as "product design choices" rather than "content" afforded the plaintiffs a seemingly effective loophole to get around Section 230 protections against liability, writing "This distinction — between 'design' and 'content' — sounds reasonable for about three seconds. Then you realize it falls apart completely. Here’s a thought experiment: imagine Instagram, but every single post is a video of paint drying. Same infinite scroll. Same autoplay. Same algorithmic recommendations. Same notification systems. Is anyone addicted?" Masnick makes the point that because features such as infinite scroll and autoplay are not inherently addictive themselves, the real point at issue in the case is the user-generated content being delivered via these features: "If every editorial decision about how to present third-party content is now a 'design choice' subject to product liability, Section 230 protects effectively nothing."

Eric Goldman, a professor at Santa Clara University of Law, had similar criticisms, writing that the court "rejected Section 230’s application to large parts of the plaintiffs’ case, holding that the claims sought to impose liability on how social media services configured their offerings and not third-party content. But social media’s offerings consist of third-party content, and the configurations were publishers’ editorial decisions about how to present it. So the line between first-party 'design' choices and publication decisions about third-party content seems illusory to me."

== See also ==
- Google litigation
- Internet addiction disorder
- Internet addiction in the United States
- Lawsuits involving Meta Platforms
- Lawsuits involving TikTok
- Recommender system (commonly called simply "the algorithm" of a particular site or service)
