= KGM =

KGM may refer to:

- King's Gallantry Medal British gallantry award
- General Directorate of Highways (Turkey) (Turkish: Karayolları Genel Müdürlüğü)
- Kathgodam railway station, Indian Railway station code
- Kingham railway station has National Rail code KGM
- Palikúr language, also known as Karipuna of Amapá, an Arawakan language of Brazil and French Guiana, with ISO 639 code kgm
- kg·m, sometimes run together as kgm, an obsolete unit symbol for the kilopondmetre (sometimes erroneously called kilogramme-force metre, therefore kgm), a unit of torque
- KG Mobility, the South Korean car company formerly known as SsangYong
- K.G.M. v. Meta et al., 2026 court case in California
