= Carolyn Kuhl =

American lawyer (born 1952)

Judge of the Los Angeles County Superior Court
- Incumbent
- Assumed office 1995
- Nominated by: Pete Wilson

Personal details
- Born: Carolyn Barbara Kuhl; July 24, 1952 (age 74) St. Louis, Missouri, U.S.
- Spouse: William Highberger
- Children: 2
- Education: Princeton University (AB); Duke University (JD)

Carolyn Barbara Kuhl (born July 24, 1952) is an American lawyer and jurist serving as a judge on the Los Angeles County Superior Court. She became a Superior Court judge in 1995 and was nominated to a seat on the United States Court of Appeals for the Ninth Circuit on June 22, 2001, by President George W. Bush.

== Early life and education ==
Kuhl was born on July 24, 1952, in St. Louis, Missouri. In 1974, she received bachelor's degree in chemistry from Princeton University with honors. Kuhl was in the second class of women to graduate from Princeton. She graduated with honors from Duke University School of Law in 1977, where she was a member of the Order of the Coif and an editor of the Duke Law Journal. From 1977 to 1978, Kuhl clerked for Anthony Kennedy when he was an appellate judge on the United States Court of Appeals for the Ninth Circuit.

== Career ==
From 1981 to 1986, Kuhl served in the United States Department of Justice, including as deputy solicitor general, deputy assistant attorney general in the Civil Division, and special assistant to Attorney General William French Smith. From 1986 to 1995, Kuhl was a partner in the Los Angeles law firm of Munger, Tolles & Olson. Her practice focused on civil business litigation in both federal and state courts with a specialty in appellate litigation.

=== Ninth Circuit nomination ===
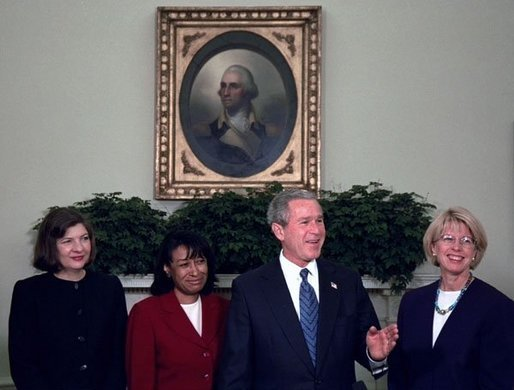
Kuhl with President George W. Bush, Priscilla Owen, and Janice Rogers Brown in 2003

On June 22, 2001, Kuhl was nominated by President George W. Bush to a seat on the United States Court of Appeals for the Ninth Circuit vacated by Judge James R. Browning, who had taken senior status in 2000. Her nomination was not processed during the 107th Congress.

In the 2002 midterm congressional elections, the Republicans regained control of the Senate. During the new 108th Congress, Senator Orrin Hatch, the new Republican chairman of the Senate Judiciary Committee, began to process previously blocked judicial nominees. California's two Democratic senators, Dianne Feinstein and Barbara Boxer, announced their opposition to Kuhl's nomination. Contrary to the blue slip system, Hatch gave Kuhl a hearing and passed her out of committee.

Kuhl's nomination was filibustered on November 14, 2003, when the Senate failed to end debate with a 53–43 cloture vote, which fell seven votes shy of the 60 needed to overcome the filibuster. In December 2004, Kuhl withdrew her nomination. In 2006, new Bush nominee Sandra Segal Ikuta was confirmed to the seat to which Kuhl had originally been nominated.

=== California judiciary ===
On May 26, 2006, Chief Justice Ronald M. George of the California Supreme Court appointed Kuhl to the Judicial Council of California, the constitutional policy-making body of the California courts. Kuhl has also served as a member of the Advisory Committee on Civil Jury Instructions and Collaborative Court-County Working Group on Enhanced Collections. Additionally, she was a member of the Governing Committee for the Center for Judicial Education and Research (CJER).

In 1995, Kuhl became a judge on the Superior Court of California for the County of Los Angeles. In 2026, Kuhl presided over K.G.M. v. Meta et al., which has been described as a bellwether trial for personal injury claims against social media companies.

In October 2012, Kuhl was elected to the post of assistant presiding judge of the court for 2013 and 2014, defeating Judge Dan T. Oki. By court tradition, she served her two-year term as assistant presiding judge and then ran unopposed for the post of presiding judge for 2015 and 2016.

=== Law reform work ===
Kuhl was elected to the American Law Institute in October 1988 and was elected to the ALI Council in May 2012. She served as an Adviser on the Principles of the Law of Aggregate Litigation project, and continues to serve as an Adviser on Principles of Government Ethics and the Restatement Third, the Law of Consumer Contracts.

== Personal life ==
Kuhl lives with her two daughters and her husband, William Highberger, who is also a judge on the Los Angeles County Superior Court.

== See also ==
- George W. Bush judicial appointment controversies
