= Computer addiction =

Excessive or compulsive use of computers

Computer addiction is a form of behavioral addiction that can be described as the excessive or compulsive use of the computer, which persists despite serious negative consequences for personal, social, or occupational function. Another clear conceptualization is made by J. J. Block, who stated in a journal entry for the American Journal of Psychiatry that "Conceptually, the diagnosis is a compulsive-impulsive spectrum disorder that involves online and/or offline computer usage and consists of at least three subtypes: excessive gaming, sexual preoccupations, and e-mail/text messaging". Computer addiction is not currently included in the Diagnostic and Statistical Manual of Mental Disorders (DSM-5) as an official disorder. The concept of computer addiction is broadly divided into two types, namely offline computer addiction, and online computer addiction. Offline computer addiction is normally used when speaking about excessive gaming behavior, which can be practiced both offline and online. Online computer addiction, also known as Internet addiction, gets more attention in general from scientific research than offline computer addiction, mainly because most cases of computer addiction are related to the excessive use of the Internet.

Experts on Internet addiction have described this syndrome as an individual working intensely on the Internet, prolonged use of the Internet, uncontrollable use of the Internet, unable to use the Internet in an efficient, timely matter, not being interested in the outside world, not spending time with people from the outside world, and an increase in their loneliness and dejection.

== Symptoms ==
- Being drawn by the computer as soon as one wakes up and before one goes to bed
- Replacing old hobbies with excessive use of the computer and using the computer as one's primary source of entertainment and procrastination
- Lacking physical exercise and/or outdoor exposure because of constant use of the computer, which could contribute to many health problems such as obesity
- Backache
- Headaches
- Weight gain or loss
- Disturbances in sleep
- Carpal tunnel syndrome
- Blurred or strained vision
- Depression and marital infidelity

== Effects ==
Excessive computer use may result in, or occur with:

- Lack of face to face social interaction
- Computer vision syndrome

== Causes ==
Kimberly Young indicates that previous research links internet or computer addiction with existing mental health issues, most notably depression. She states that computer addiction has significant effects socially, such as low self-esteem, psychologically and occupationally, which led many subjects to academic failure.

According to a Korean study on internet or computer addiction, pathological use of the internet results in negative life impacts such as job loss, marriage breakdown, financial debt, and academic failure. 70% of internet users in Korea are reported to play online games, 18% of whom are diagnosed as game addicts, which relates to internet or computer addiction. The authors of the article conducted a study using Kimberly Young's questionnaire. The study showed that the majority of those who met the requirements of internet or computer addiction experienced interpersonal difficulties and stress and that those addicted to online games specifically responded that they hoped to avoid reality.

== Types ==
Computers nowadays rely almost entirely on the internet, and thus relevant research articles relating to internet addiction may also be relevant to computer addiction.

- Video game addiction: a behavioral addiction characterized by excessive or compulsive use of computer games or video games, which interferes with a person's everyday life. Video game addiction may present itself as compulsive gaming, social isolation, mood swings, diminished imagination, and hyper-focus on in-game achievements, to the exclusion of other events in life.
- Social media addiction: Data suggest that participants use social media to fulfill their social needs but are typically dissatisfied. Lonely individuals are drawn to the Internet for emotional support. This could interfere with "real-life socializing" by reducing face-to-face relationships. Some of these views are summed up in an Atlantic article by Stephen Marche entitled Is Facebook Making Us Lonely?, in which the author argues that social media provides more breadth, but not the depth of relationships that humans require and that users begin to find it difficult to distinguish between the meaningful relationships which we foster in the real world and the numerous casual relationships that are formed through social media.

== Cyberstalking ==
According to Prof. Jordana N. Navarro et al. Cyberstalking is known as a behavior that includes but not limited to internet or technology use to stalk or harass an individual over time and in a menacing fashion. Cyberstalking has been on the rise since the 1990s. These cryptic behaviors are also noticeable. Many of the cyberstalking cases are from people that do not know each other. Cyberstalkers are not limited to geographical boundaries, research has suggested various impulses in cyberstalking aside from excreting power and control over the target. Internet addiction and cyberstalking share several key traits that should lend support to new investigations to further scrutinize the relationship between the two disorders. Studies have shown that cyberstalkers can have different motives, but these results are not necessarily indicative of mental health issues. A cyberstalker is usually an emotionally damaged individual, a loner who seeks attention, gratification, and connection becoming infatuated with someone in the process (Navarro et al. 2015).

== Diagnostic Test ==
Many studies and surveys are being conducted to measure the extent of this type of addiction. Kimberly Young has created a questionnaire based on other disorders to assess the level of addiction. It is called the Internet Addict Diagnostic Questionnaire or IADQ. The questionnaire asks users about their online usage habits as well as their feelings about their internet usage. According to the IADQ sample, Internet Addiction resembles that of a Gambling disorder. Answering positively to five out of the eight questions on the IADQ may be indicative of online addiction.

According to the article "Validating the Distinction between Computer Addiction and Engagement: Online Game Playing and Personality", the authors introduced a test to help identify the differences between addiction and engagement. Based on similar ideas, here are some ways to distinguish between computer engagement and addiction.

| Computer engagement: | Computer addiction: |
|---|---|
| I would not think about computers when I am doing other important things | I would ignore valued things because I am interested in my computer |
| I would not give up my work or school day because I want to spend more time on a computer | I would sometimes give up my friends or family gathering because I am interested in my computer |
| I would not think about the computer when I am not using it | I would not be able to focus on my work or study because I am interested in my computer |
| I would not be anxious if I were told to not use a computer | I would be anxious if I were told to not use a computer |
| I would succeed if I want to reduce the time that I spend on a computer | I would not succeed if I want to reduce the time that I spend on a computer |
| My schedule would not be affected by a computer | I often stay up at night because I want to spend more time on the computer |
| I don't think that I am addicted to computer | I think that I am addicted to computer |

== Origin of the term and history ==
Observations about the addictiveness of computers, and more specifically, computer games date back at least to the mid-1970s. Addiction and addictive behavior were common among the users of the PLATO system at the University of Illinois. British e-learning academic Nicholas Rushby suggested in his 1979 book, An Introduction to Educational Computing, that people can be addicted to computers and experience withdrawal symptoms. The term was also used by M. Shotton in 1989 in her book Computer Addiction. However, Shotton concludes that the 'addicts' are not truly addicted. Dependency on computers, she argues, is better understood as a challenging and exciting pastime that can also lead to a professional career in the field. Computers do not turn gregarious, extroverted people into recluses; instead, they offer introverts a source of inspiration, excitement, and intellectual stimulation. Shotton's work seriously questions the legitimacy of the claim that computers cause addiction.

The term became more widespread with the explosive growth of the Internet, as well the availability of the personal computer. Computers and the Internet both started to take shape as a personal and comfortable medium that could be used by anyone who wanted to make use of it. With that explosive growth of individuals making use of PCs and the Internet, the question started to arise whether or not misuse or excessive use of these new technologies could be possible as well. It was hypothesized that, like any technology aimed specifically at human consumption and use, abuse could have severe consequences for the individual in the short term and the society in the long term. In the late nineties people who made use of PCs and the internet were already referred to the term webaholics or cyberholics. Pratarelli et al. suggested at that point already to label "a cluster of behaviors potentially causing problems" as a computer or Internet addiction.

There are other examples of computer overuse that date back to the earliest computer games. Press reports have furthermore noted that some Finnish Defence Forces conscripts were not mature enough to meet the demands of military life and were required to interrupt or postpone military service for a year. One reported source of the lack of needed social skills is an overuse of computer games or the Internet. Forbes termed this overuse "Web fixations", and stated that they were responsible for 12 such interruptions or deferrals over the 5 years from 2000 to 2005.

== See also ==
- Behavioral modernity
- Computer rage
- Digital media use and mental health
- Evolutionary mismatch
- Underearners Anonymous
- Video game addiction
