= Mark D. Griffiths =

British psychologist

- Education: University of Bradford; University of Exeter
- Known for: Theories of gambling addiction, components model of addiction
- Scientific career
- Fields: Behavioral addiction
- Workplaces: Nottingham Trent University

Mark D. Griffiths is an English chartered psychologist focusing in the field of behavioural addictions, namely gambling disorder, gaming addiction, Internet addiction, sex addiction, and work addiction. He is Distinguished Emeritus Professor of Behavioural Addiction at Nottingham Trent University and was previously director of the International Gaming Research Unit. He is the author of five books including Gambling Addiction and its Treatment Within the NHS, Gambling and Gaming Addictions in Adolescence, and Adolescent Gambling. He has also authored over 600 refereed papers, 140+ book chapters and more than 1,500 articles, and has won 15 awards for his research, including a Lifetime Achievement Award For Contributions to the Field of Youth Gambling in 2006 and International Excellence Award For Gambling Research in 2003 and a Lifetime Research Award For Gambling Research in 2013.

== Education and career ==
Griffiths graduated with a BSc in Psychology from the University of Bradford. He began teaching in 1988 while working on his PhD at University of Exeter. He was a lecturer for the Workers' Education Association and did weekly support teaching at Exeter University. He completed his PhD thesis on fruit machine addiction at Exeter University in 1990, under the supervision of Paul Webley and Stephen Lea. Having acquired his degree, in 1990 he started his first full-time lectureship at the University of Plymouth, where he also gained his teaching qualifications. In 1995 he moved to Nottingham Trent University, where he worked as a Professor of Gambling Studies until his retirement in 2025.

Over the course of his career, Griffiths has served on over 20 national and international committees, including the European Association for the Study of Gambling, Society for the Study of Gambling, Gamblers Anonymous General Services Board, National Council on Gambling, and GamCare. He is an editorial board member of International Gambling Studies, Journal of Gambling Issues, International Journal of Casino and Business, International Journal of Cyber Behavior, Psychology and Learning, and Aloma: Revista de Psicologia, and has advised governmental bodies in the UK, Australia, Canada, Israel, Finland, Sweden and Norway.

Griffiths and members of the Gaming Research Unit have worked with various international and national game companies to help develop social responsibility guidelines and policies, carry out audits of social responsibility practices within online and offline gaming environments, develop harm minimisation practices within gaming environments, help design safer gaming products and assess psychosocial impact of new games, and provide research and consultancy services in the psychology of gaming practices. Some of these companies include the United Kingdom Gambling Commission, the Canadian Nova Scotia Gaming Corporation, the Irish National Lottery, and Casino Cosmopol.

In early 2007, Griffiths opposed the hosting of a super-style casino in Blackpool, arguing that it "wasn't typical in terms of demographics, and that the proposed seafront location was too close to the poorest residential areas of town," and supporting the location of the casino in Manchester. In 2014, Griffiths was featured in an extensive interview with RightCasino.com. In the course of the discussion, he recommended that the commercial gambling industry emulate the Camelot Group, who derive their profits from a comparatively large pool of customers, thus spreading the financial and social impact of gambling losses. He also described the proclivity of adolescents to develop addictive behaviours through playing free, casino-style games on social media platforms (e.g. Zynga Poker). He criticised such games as the "number one risk factor for adolescent gambling addiction."

== Research fields ==
Griffiths' research focuses on the psychology of excessive behavior. His research interests include online research methods, internet studies, cyberpsychology, behavioural addiction, gambling addiction, video game addiction, internet addiction, exercise addiction, and sex addiction. He has also conducted research in social responsibility in gambling and teaching and learning in higher education. In these fields he has published over 400 refereed research papers, three books, 70 book chapters and over 1,000 other articles. Quite a few of them are, however, comments or replies. He is best recognised for his work on gambling and game addiction where, for example, he explores how people from different ages are drawn to gambling. For example, he has reported that demo versions and online "skill schools" where players gamble with points rather than money appeal more to teenagers than adults. Furthermore, he has established that factors such as earning points, finding rare game items, and fast loading times are more important for video game players than gender, age, and time spent playing.

He has written on egomania, which he defines as an obsessive preoccupation with the self, teratophilia and pandrogyny.

One of Griffiths' most highly cited papers, from 2005, describes addiction using a model based on six closely related components (salience, mood modification, tolerance, withdrawal, conflict and relapse). Griffiths argues that all six components must be present for a problematic behaviour to qualify as an addiction.

== Prominent findings ==
A 2007 study, co-authored with Helena Cole, explored social interactions that occur both within and outside of MMORPGs. Griffiths and Cole surveyed 912 MMORPG players across 45 countries. The study showed that social interactions in MMORPGs are a major component in the enjoyment of playing video games. The study also showed MMORPGs "can be extremely social games, with a high percentage of gamers making lifelong friends and partners". The study concluded that "virtual gaming may allow players to express themselves in ways they might not feel comfortable doing in real life because of their appearance, gender, sexuality, and/or age". This study is one of several that Griffiths has conducted on the topic of how video games affect social interactions.

== Awards ==
Griffiths has received awards including:

- US National Council on Problem Gambling Research Award – 06/2009.
- Royal Society of Arts Fellowship Award – 12/2007.
- Lifetime Achievement Award for Contributions to the Field of Youth Gambling – 05/2006, from the US Institute for the Study of Gambling and Commercial Gaming.
- British Psychological Society Fellowship Award – 03/2006.
- Excellence in Teaching of Psychology Award – 03/2006, from the British Psychological Society.
- Joseph Lister Prize – 09/2004, from the British Association for the Advancement of Science.
- International Excellence Award (Canadian Responsible Gambling Council) – 09/2003.
- CELEJ Prize – 09/1998, from the Spanish Centre for Legal Studies on Gaming (El Centro de Estudios de Legislación Sobre el Juego)
- John Rosecrance Gambling Research Prize – 06/1994, from the US Institute for the Study of Gambling and Commercial Gaming.

== Books ==
- Griffiths, Mark (1995). Adolescent Gambling. London: Routledge.
- Griffiths, Mark (2002). Gambling and Gaming Addictions in Adolescence. Leicester: British Psychological Society/Blackwells.
- Griffiths, Mark; Jayesinghe, Nicky (2007). Gambling Addiction and Its Treatment Within the NHS: A Guide for Healthcare Professionals. London: British Medical Association. ISBN 978-1-905545-11-7.
- Griffiths, Mark; Meyer, Gerhard; Hayer, Tobias (Eds.) (2009). Problem Gaming in Europe: Challenges, Prevention, and Interventions. New York: Springer. ISBN 978-0-387-09486-1.
- Griffiths, Mark (2024). Sexual Perversions and Paraphilias: An A to Z. United States: Curtis Press. ISBN 9781068589706.

== Journal publications ==
- Griffiths, Mark; De Freitas, Sara (2008). "The convergence of gaming practices with other media forms: What potential for learning? A review of the literature" (PDF). Learning, Media and Technology. 33: 11–20. doi:10.1080/17439880701868796. S2CID 62596082.
- Griffiths, Mark; Barnes, Andrew (2008). "Internet gambling: An online empirical study among student gamblers". International Journal of Mental Health and Addiction. 6 (2): 194–204. doi:10.1007/s11469-007-9083-7. S2CID 24002313.
- Griffiths, Mark; Meredith, Alex (2009). "Videogame addiction and its treatment". Journal of Contemporary Psychotherapy. 39 (4): 47–53. doi:10.1007/s10879-009-9118-4. S2CID 28660085.
- Griffiths, Mark; Parke, Jonathan; Wood, Richard; Rigbye, Jane (2010). "Online poker gambling in university students: Further findings from an online survey". International Journal of Mental Health and Addiction. 8 (1): 82–89. doi:10.1007/s11469-009-9203-7. S2CID 35067109.
- Griffiths, Mark; Wardle, Heather; Orford, Jim; Sproston, Kerry; Erens, Bob (2011). "Internet gambling, health, smoking and alcohol use: Findings from the 2007 British Gambling Prevalence Survey". International Journal of Mental Health and Addiction. 9 (1): 1–11. doi:10.1007/s11469-009-9246-9. S2CID 28428904.
- Griffiths, Mark; Wardle, Heather; Orford, Jim; Sproston, Kerry; Erens, Bob (2009). "Sociodemographic correlates of Internet gambling: Findings from the 2007 British Gambling Prevalence Survey" (PDF). Cyberpsychology & Behavior. 12 (2): 199–202. doi:10.1089/cpb.2008.0196. PMID 19072080.
- Griffiths, Mark; Hussain, Zaheer (2008). "Gender swapping and socialising in cyberspace: An exploratory study" (PDF). Cyberpsychology & Behavior. 11 (1): 47–53. doi:10.1089/cpb.2007.0020. PMID 18275312.
- Griffiths, Mark; Parke, Jonathan; Parke, Adrian (2007). "Positive thinking among slot machine gamblers: A case of maladaptive coping?". International Journal of Mental Health and Addiction. 5: 39–52. doi:10.1007/s11469-006-9049-1. S2CID 26055310.
- Griffiths, Mark; Sergeant, Mark; Dickins, Thomas; Davies, Mark (2007). "Women's hedonic ratings of body odor of heterosexual and homosexual men" (PDF). Archives of Sexual Behavior. 36 (3): 395–401. doi:10.1007/s10508-006-9126-3. PMID 17186122. S2CID 32306453.
- Griffiths, Mark; Wood, Richard (2007). "A qualitative investigation of problem gambling as an escape-based coping strategy". Psychology and Psychotherapy: Theory, Research and Practice. 80 (Pt 1): 107–125. doi:10.1348/147608306X107881. PMID 17346384.
- Griffiths, Mark; Wood, Richard (2007). "Online guidance, advice, and support for problem gamblers and concerned relatives and friends: An evaluation of the GamAid pilot service". British Journal of Guidance and Counselling. 35 (4): 373–389. doi:10.1080/03069880701593540. S2CID 145464531.
- Griffiths, Mark (1988). The Psychological Deception and Perception of Slot Machines. Economic Psychology Research Group.
- Griffiths, Mark (1988). Factors in Gambling and Sexual Behaviour. Economic Psychology Research Group.
- Griffiths, Mark (1988). Gambling in Children and Adolescents. Economic Psychology Research Group.
- Griffiths, Mark (1988). Addiction to Fruit Machines: A Preliminary Study. Economic Psychology Research Group.
- Griffiths, Mark (1988). The Psychological Deception and Perception of Slot Machines. Economic Psychology Research Group.
