= Dopamine sites =

Websites that simulate online behaviours without real-life consequences

Dopamine sites are a category of websites designed to replicate the user interface and interaction patterns of potentially addictive online activities – such as online food ordering, e-commerce, or social media browsing – but without any transactions or outcome. Users can click, scroll, and "purchase" items that never arrive, or post content that receives simulated engagement. The term references the dopamine release associated with reward-seeking behaviour, and these sites are sometimes marketed as "placebo" alternatives to their real-world counterparts.

Examples include, 음식만안와요 (roughly translated to Only the food doesn't arrive) (a simulated food-delivery service), and Dopamine Shop (mock e-commerce platform).

The sites typically imitate the visual design, loading animations, and interactive features of popular apps, however without delivering the service that the original app is designed for.

== Background and premise ==
The concept behind dopamine-hit sites may draw from research into the placebo effect and its relationship to the brain's reward circuitry. Some neuroscientific studies have linked placebo responses to the release of neurochemicals such as dopamine, suggesting that the expectation of a reward can trigger a physiological response even in the absence of an actual reward.

=== Origins in South Korea ===
The trend was first reported in Korean media in May 2026, when the Hankook Ilbo described a rise in "dopamine sites" among young Koreans seeking brief stimulation without cost, addiction, or other consequences. The article described a fake food-delivery site letting users browse menus and track a simulated courier without placing a real order, as well as a separate site called Dambae Time (Korean: 담배타임, literally translating to "cigarette time") that recreated the atmosphere of an office break room by showing other users online in real time.

Kim Heon-sik, a professor at Jungwon University, has compared these sites to mukbang culture — an online culture where viewers watch celebrities or social media influencers eat food. He argues that both dopamine-hit sites and mukbang content let consumers experience a hit of dopamine or mental satiation at the press of a button, without the real-world consequences of mindless eating or social media posting and commenting. Rising living costs and delivery fees have also been cited as a factor drawing users to the sites as a lower-pressure alternative to real ordering.

The trend would spread across the world to China and the US after seeing success in South Korea. with commentators on popular news websites describing the appeal as getting the feeling of anticipation from a purchase without spending the money or receiving the item.

== Examples and features ==
Several websites have been identified as falling into this category:

=== Food Never Arrives (음식만 안와요) ===
A fake food-delivery simulator that mimics the ordering process of popular delivery apps. Users select meals from a menu, wait through a simulated preparation and dispatch timer, and receive a confirmation screen – but no food is ever sent.

==== foodnevercomes.com ====
On the homepage of another site (foodnevercomes.com, an English-by-default alternative), the developers claim to be the "only official FoodNeverComes site" and that they are "the Korean dopamine site link everyone shares" despite the fact they claim to be "funded and built by NeuroX AI", who are based in Udaipur, India - not Korea.

They also claim that their site was built using vibe coding, a term used to describe AI-assisted, prompt-driven software development, and they have framed the site as a demonstration of that workflow.

The first Wayback Machine archive for the site with the Korean domain name (음식만안와요.com) came before the first archive for foodnevercomes.com.

According to WHOIS lookups, 음식만안와요.com was created on April 2, 2026, while foodnevercomes.com was created on June 23, 2026.

== Potential adverse effects and criticism ==
Writing for The Conversation, digital culture researcher Gary Mortimer raised several concerns about the growing popularity of these applications. He argued that while the sites are presented as harmless placebos, they may function as a "gateway behaviour" – normalising the interface and feeling of online shopping, food delivery or social media, and potentially drawing users back into the original behaviours they were trying to avoid in the first place.

Mortimer also highlighted privacy and commercial tracking issues. Many dopamine-hit sites embed standard analytics and advertising trackers, including services provided by Google Ads. Consequently, users who visit these sites to escape the pull of consumer culture may, ironically, begin receiving targeted advertisements for the very products and services the sites simulate. This creates a potential conflict of interest between the stated purpose of the websites and their underlying data-collection infrastructure, which is often indistinguishable from that of commercial e-commerce or social-media platforms.

== See also ==
- Internet addiction disorder
- Placebo effect
