= AppBlock =

Software tool for managing screen time

- Developer: MobileSoft s.r.o.
- Release: 2015
- Stable release: 4.4.0
- Operating system: Android; iOS; iPadOS; watchOS
- Platform: Android smartphones and tablets; iPhone; iPad; Apple Watch; Google Chrome; Microsoft Edge; Brave
- Available in: English; Arabic; Czech; Dutch; French; German; Indonesian; Italian; Japanese; Korean; Portuguese; Russian; Slovak; Spanish; Turkish
- Type: Productivity
- License: Proprietary software
- Website: appblock.app

AppBlock is a software tool for managing screen time that limits access to selected mobile applications and websites. Developed by the Czech studio MobileSoft, it is distributed for Android and iOS devices as well as through browser extensions for Google Chrome, Microsoft Edge and Brave, and as desktop solutions. The application is used primarily to restrict time spent on social media and similar distracting services while working and studying. By 2025, the application reported 700,000 monthly active users, with the domestic Czech market accounting for less than one percent of its total user base and revenue.

== History ==
=== Origins ===
AppBlock was created by the Czech software studio MobileSoft, based in Hradec Králové. The studio was founded in 2012 by Miroslav Novosvětský, who remains the sole owner. The idea for the application arose from the use of browser-based website blockers on desktop computers. AppBlock was conceived as a way to reduce the time spent on mobile devices.

=== Early releases ===
In its early phase, AppBlock was available only for phones running on Android. Early versions allowed users to limit access to selected applications and websites during specified periods. From the outset, the application was distributed internationally rather than only within the Czech market, and early coverage reported a multi-million number of downloads worldwide.

=== Expansion of functionality ===
Over time, AppBlock has expanded beyond basic application blocking to include additional functions related to limiting procrastination and managing attention.

The development of AppBlock accelerated during the COVID-19 pandemic. Following a reduction in external client orders, the studio reallocated resources from contract development to the application. Increased digital content consumption during lockdowns contributed to a rise in the application's usage and revenue.

As the application developed, it became the company's product with the largest user base. Novosvětský described an increase in downloads over a twelve-month period, which he linked in part to the company's activities abroad, including participation in events focused on mobile marketing in the United States. These activities were an important factor in the further development of AppBlock.

=== Internationalization and market expansion ===
Within roughly the first eight years of the company's existence, MobileSoft became active both in the domestic Czech market and in the United States, supported among other things by participation in the CzechAccelerator program, which is intended to help Czech firms enter foreign markets.

In mid-August 2021 the developers launched a version for iOS, which soon began to attract paying users. The expansion to iOS was accompanied by plans for cooperation with the Procrastination.com platform, intended to complement the blocking functions with educational content related to digital media use, sleep and work habits.

By 2025, AppBlock was localised into 15 languages, with the largest share of users in the United States, the United Kingdom, Germany, and France, with recent growth in Brazil, and usage extending across several continents. AppBlock has reached more than 10 million installations. In the same period its creators announced plans to refine existing functions and to expand support beyond mobile phones to desktop use, including through support for additional web browsers.

== Features ==
=== Supported platforms ===
AppBlock is distributed as a mobile application for Android and iOS users through Google Play and the Apple App Store. Browser extensions for desktop systems are available for Google Chrome, Microsoft Edge and Brave.

=== Functionality ===
AppBlock's core function is to restrict access to selected applications and websites. The mobile application shows a list of installed apps and lets the user select which ones to block. It also includes tools to block specific websites and, on iOS, to block certain phrases entered in the Safari browser. On Android, blocking can also be applied to specific sections within apps, such as Instagram Reels, YouTube Shorts, and Snapchat Stories, instead of blocking the entire app. AppBlock can mute notifications from selected applications, so alerts from those apps do not appear while blocking is active. In addition to choosing which apps or content to block, the software also offers an allowlist mode, where only selected applications remain accessible and all others are blocked. AppBlock can also block adult websites using a built-in list of such sites.

Blocking rules are organized into configurable schedules, called profiles. Users can create profiles that define time periods when selected apps and websites are unavailable. Newer versions also allow profiles to be activated automatically based on the time of day, days of the week, the device's location, or connection to specific Wi-Fi networks. The iOS version lets users set limits on how often or how long certain apps can be used before they are blocked, and it can track and restrict screen time for individual apps. In addition to these recurring rules, AppBlock includes a Quick Block feature that temporarily blocks selected apps and websites with a single action, without requiring a separate long-term schedule.

Strict Mode is an optional setting that limits the ability to change blocking once it is active. For a specified period, it prevents editing AppBlock's rules and can be configured to stop the app from being uninstalled during that time. While Strict Mode is enabled, users cannot modify or disable the restrictions they have set. Deactivation requires specific verification steps, such as connecting the device to a charger or obtaining approval from a designated contact person. Alternatively, Strict Mode can be configured with a cooldown period, during which changes to the settings take effect only after a set delay.

The mobile application also includes statistical and reporting features. In addition to blocking, AppBlock lets users view statistics and data about their use of applications and websites, including screen-time summaries and focus sessions that silence notifications and enforce blocking during defined work or study periods. Browser extensions for desktop environments apply AppBlock's website-blocking functions on Windows and macOS systems through supported web browsers.

== Business model ==
AppBlock uses a freemium revenue model. The basic version of the application is available free of charge and allows blocking of up to three applications at the same time. The premium version removes this limit and adds features including allowlist mode, adult content filtering, automatic blocking of newly installed applications, and additional Strict Mode settings.

In 2020, the application shifted from a one-time payment structure to a subscription model. By 2021, AppBlock had more than seven thousand paying users and annual revenue of about four million Czech crowns. By 2025, annual revenue reached approximately 4 million US dollars (80 million CZK) before taxes and platform fees, with roughly 20 percent of active users subscribing to the paid version.

== Usage ==
AppBlock limits access to selected applications and websites in order to reduce smartphone overuse and digital distraction. It is used to block social media, games and other services considered addictive, with the aim of reducing frequent checking of mobile devices and creating time intervals in which these services are unavailable.

Reported use cases of AppBlock cover work, students, parents, ADHD, mental health, well-being and business. The application is used both by individual users and within workplace initiatives in which employees install it to reduce digital distractions during working hours.

== See also ==
- Screen time
- Time management
- Procrastination
- Productivity software
- Content-control software
