= Bellwether trial =

Type of test case in tort law

In the law of torts, a bellwether trial is a test case intended to try a widely contested issue. Bellwether trials are an increasingly common phenomenon in U.S. legal practice. Bellwether trials are especially common in multidistrict litigation (MDL) practice, where many cases have been consolidated for purposes of discovery and pretrial matters. In these MDL cases, it is not practical to prepare every case for trial. Several matters are, therefore, selected as bellwether cases and prepared for trial. They are then settled or tried, and the results are used to shape the process for addressing the remaining cases. A bellwether trial is designed to achieve value ascertainment function for settlement purposes or to answer troubling causation or liability issues common to a universe of claimants. For the tried cases to achieve these purposes, it must be representative of all cases.

== See also ==
- Bellwether
