= Internet addiction disorder =

Excessive internet usage that causes psychological disorders

Problematic internet use
- Other names: Internet addiction disorder, internet use disorder (IUD), problematic internet use (PIU), pathological internet use
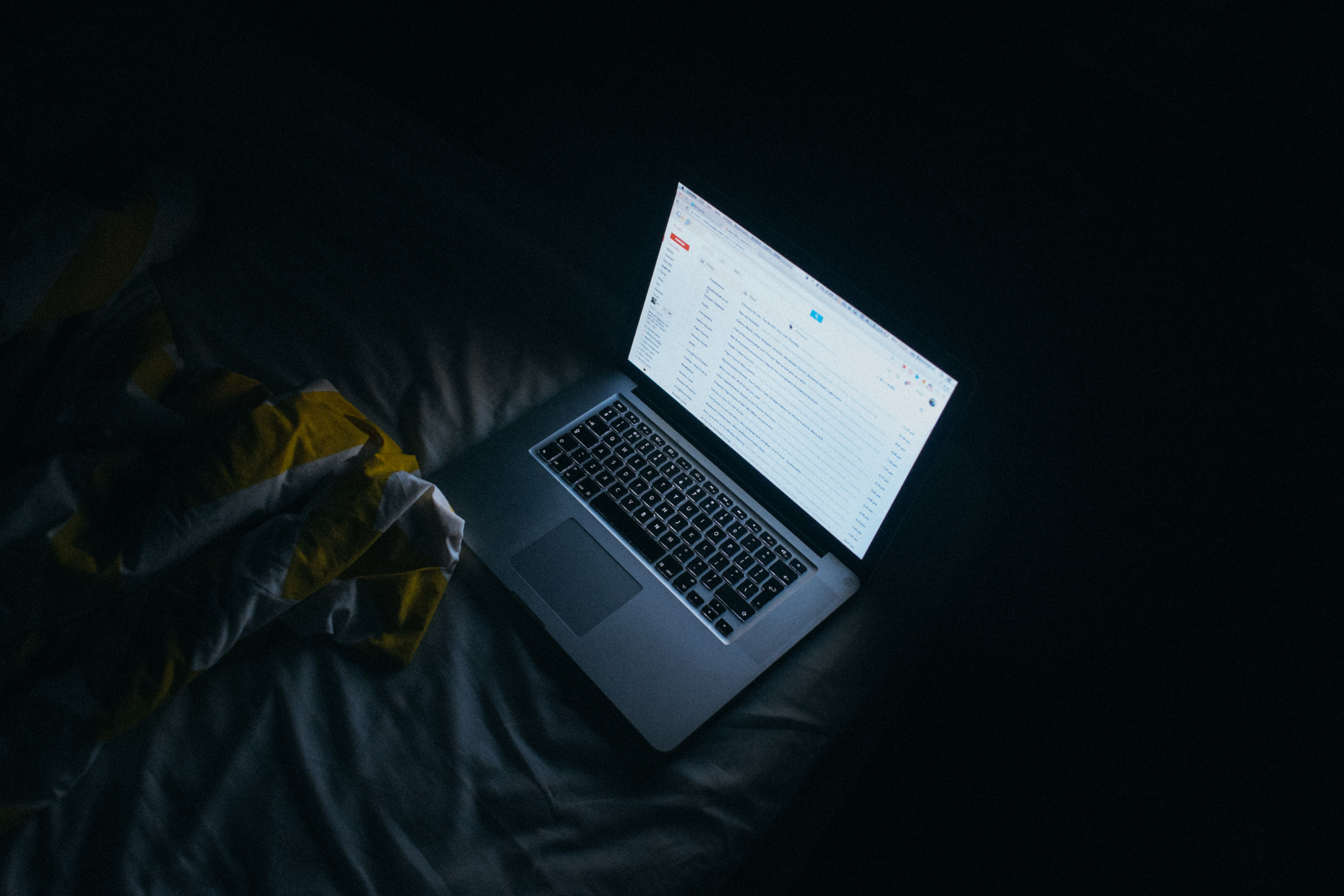
- Specialty: Psychiatry; Psychology

Internet addiction disorder (IAD), also called problematic Internet use (PIU), is characterized by excessive or poorly controlled preoccupations, urges, or behaviors regarding computer use and Internet access that lead to impairment or distress. There is concern that increased access to the Internet among young people may cause students' academic performance to decline. Some experience health consequences from loss of sleep as they stay up to continue scrolling, chatting, and gaming.

The increase in Internet access in 16-19 year olds living in EU countries

Excessive Internet use is not recognized as a disorder by the American Psychiatric Association's DSM-5 or the World Health Organization's ICD-11. Controversy around the diagnosis includes whether the disorder is a separate clinical entity, or a manifestation of other underlying psychiatric disorders. Definitions are not standardized or agreed upon, complicating the development of evidence-based recommendations.

Many different theoretical models have been developed and employed for many years in order to better explain predisposing factors to this disorder. Models such as the cognitive-behavioral model of pathological Internet have been used to explain IAD for more than 20 years. Newer models, such as the Interaction of Person-Affect-Cognition-Execution model, have been developed more recently and are starting to be applied in more clinical studies.

In 2011 the term "Facebook addiction disorder" (FAD) emerged. FAD is characterized by compulsive use of Facebook. A 2017 study investigated a correlation between excessive use and narcissism, reporting "FAD was significantly positively related to the personality trait narcissism and to negative mental health variables (depression, anxiety, and stress symptoms)".

Additionally in 2020, studies have shown that there has been an increase in the prevalence of IAD since the COVID-19 pandemic. Studies highlighting the possible relationship between COVID-19 and IAD have looked at how forced isolation and its associated stress may have led to higher usage levels of the Internet.

Turning off social media notifications may help reduce social media use. For some users, changes in web browsing can be helpful in compensating for self-regulatory problems. For instance, a study involving 157 online learners on massive open online courses examined the impact of such an intervention. The study reported that providing support in self-regulation was associated with a reduction in time spent online, particularly on entertainment.

== Consequences ==
=== Mental health consequences ===
A longitudinal study of Chinese high school students (2009) suggests that individuals with moderate to severe risk of Internet addiction are 2.5 times more likely to develop depressive symptoms than their IAD-free counterparts. Researchers studied pathological or uncontrolled Internet use, and later mental health problems in 1,041 teenage students in China. The students were free of depression and anxiety at the start of the study. Nine months later, the students were evaluated again for anxiety and depression, and 87 were judged as having developed depression, while 8 reported significant anxiety symptoms. Another longitudinal study of high school students from Helsinki found that problematic internet usage and depressive symptoms may produce a positive feedback loop. This cycle involves problematic internet usage worsening depressive symptoms, which in turn leads to even more problematic internet usage. Furthermore, problematic internet usage is associated with an increased risk of substance abuse.

Internet Addiction Disorder (IAD) is linked to a wide range of negative psychological outcomes. Excessive or uncontrolled internet use can interfere with emotional regulation, social relationships, and cognitive functioning. The major mental health consequences include:

1. Depression and Anxiety
  - IAD is strongly associated with increased risk of depressive symptoms, social anxiety, and generalized anxiety disorder.
2. Sleep Disturbances & Fatigue
  - Excessive internet use, especially late at night, contributes to insomnia, poor sleep quality, and daytime dysfunction.
3. Stress and Emotional Dysregulation
  - Individuals with IAD often experience higher levels of perceived stress and difficulty regulating emotions, leading to irritability and mood swings.
4. Social Isolation and Loneliness
  - Despite increased online interactions, IAD is linked to decreased face-to-face communication, loneliness, and impaired social functioning.
5. Comorbid Disorders (ADHD, Substance Use, Impulse Control Problems)
  - Research shows strong associations between IAD and attention-deficit/hyperactivity disorder (ADHD), substance abuse, and other impulse-control disorders.

=== Social consequences ===
Internet addiction increases the risk of many negative social and health outcomes, including poor academic performance, harmful personality effects, anxiety and depression.

The best-documented evidence of Internet addiction so far is time-disruption, which subsequently results in interference with regular social life, including academic, professional performance and daily routines. Some studies also reveal that IAD can lead to disruption of social relationships in Europe and Taiwan. It is, however, also noted by others that IAD is beneficial for peer relations in Taiwan.

Keith W. Beard (2005) states that "an individual is addicted when an individual's psychological state, which includes both mental and emotional states, as well as their scholastic, occupational and social interactions, is impaired by the overuse of [Internet]".

As a result of its complex nature, some scholars do not provide a definition of Internet addiction disorder and throughout time, different terms are used to describe the same phenomenon of excessive Internet use. Internet addiction disorder is used interchangeably with problematic Internet use, pathological Internet use, and Internet addictive disorder. In some cases, this behavior is also referred to as Internet overuse, problematic computer use, compulsive Internet use, Internet abuse, harmful use of the Internet, and Internet dependency.

Mustafa Savci and Ferda Aysan, reviewing existing research, noted a number of social and emotional factors that have been linked to the phenomenon, including loneliness, social anxiety, depression, and low self-esteem. However they note that some research has also shown that the use of technology can strengthen friendships, facilitate interpersonal conversations and communication, and aid the establishment of new social relations.

== Signs and symptoms ==
=== Physical symptoms ===
Physical symptoms include a weakened immune system due to lack of sleep, loss of exercise, and increased risk for carpal tunnel syndrome. Additionally, headaches, eye and back strain are common for those struggling with excessive internet use.

=== Psychological and social symptoms ===
The type of IAD (e.g. overuse of social media, gaming, gambling, etc.) will affect the types of symptoms experienced. For example, overuse of social media can lead to disruption in real-world relationships. The overuse of video games can lead to neglecting family, home, and work-related responsibilities. Additionally, the overconsumption of pornographic content can create interpersonal and relational problems and can negatively affect mental health.

Symptoms of withdrawal might include agitation, depression, anger and anxiety when the person is away from technology. These psychological symptoms might even turn into physical symptoms such as rapid heartbeat, tense shoulders and shortness of breath.

== Theoretical model ==
Current researchers have proposed different theoretical models of IAD from different perspectives.

=== Theories based on the characteristics of the Internet ===
==== ACE model ====
This theory suggests that addiction is caused by the characteristics of the Internet itself, including anonymity, convenience and escape, referred to as the ACE model. Anonymity means that individuals are able to hide their true identity and personal information on the Internet and are thus freer to do what they want. Because of this anonymity, it is difficult to regulate what individuals do on the Internet, thus creating an Internet addiction. Convenience may be a benefit of the development of the Internet, as people can do certain things such as shopping online and watching movies without leaving their homes. However, this convenience can also lead to addiction and dependence on the Internet. Escape refers to the ability of users to find solace online when faced with difficulty or irritation, because the Internet offers a free virtual environment that entices people away from the actual world. Originally the ACE Model was used to describe Internet pornography addiction, but now it is applied to the whole field of IAD.

==== Reduced social cues ====
The invention of email and SMS made online chatting a reality. However, in online communication, the individual's ability to judge the mood, tone and content of the other person is reduced because the necessary social cues, such as situational and personal cues, are missing. As online norms are currently imperfect, it is difficult to regulate individuals' behaviors on the Internet, and the anonymity of the Internet can make individuals' perceptions of themselves and others diminish, resulting in some anti-social behavior. Consequently, this can lead to inappropriate Internet use and addiction without proper restraints.

=== Theories based on interaction orientation ===
==== Cognitive-behavioral model of pathological Internet use ====
This model defines IAD as pathological Internet use (PIU). In 2001, the cognitive-behavioral model for excessive use of the Internet was created. This model proposed that already existing psychosocial problems (e.g., depression, anxiety, substance abuse) were more likely to lead to the development of excessive and maladaptive behaviors related to the Internet. Importantly, Davis categorized problematic behaviors on the Internet into two categories: specific pathological Internet use (SPIU) and generalized pathological Internet use (GPIU). SPIU behaviors include frequently accessing things such as pornography or other sexually explicit material, stock trading, and online gambling. GPIU behaviors simply include fixating on the Internet itself, rather than particular materials that are accessed through the Internet. Additionally, people engaged in GPIU behaviors are drawn by the different forms of communication that the Internet allows them to engage in. In general, the Internet would lead to maladaptive cognitions, and predisposed vulnerability could reinforce this relationship.

Moreover, the higher the individual's level of adaptation to undesirable behavior, the more likely pathological Internet use is to occur, which also means a higher level of addiction to the Internet.

==== I-PACE Model ====
This is an integrative theoretical framework model that specifically focuses on Internet Gaming Disorder (IGD). As compulsive gaming on the Internet can be a constituting factor of Internet Addiction Disorder, this model can be seen as applicable. The I-PACE model, which stands for Interaction of Person-Affect-Cognition-Execution model, focuses on the process of predisposing factors and current behaviors leading to compulsive use of the Internet. This model considers pre-disposing factors such as early childhood experiences, personality, cognitive-situational reactions, social cognition, and pre-disposition to mental illness as factors that may play into the development of Internet Gaming Disorder.

==== Game addiction and flow experience ====
The flow experience is an emotional experience in which an individual shows a strong interest in an event or object that drives the individual to become fully engaged in it. It was first introduced by Csikszentmihalyi in the 1960s, and he also proposed a systematic model of the flow experience. According to his theory, the flow experience comes from performing challenges at a level similar to the individual's own, which means that people could fully commit to the challenge and do their best to complete it. When individuals are faced with a challenge that is too different from their own level, they may lose interest because it is too easy or too difficult. Online games are a real-life application of this model. Based on Csikszentmihalyi's theory, the theory called GameFlow suggests 8 characteristics that can create a sense of immersion in players: concentration, challenge, skills, control, clear goals, feedback, immersion, and social interaction. With these elements, games would be really addictive and result in Internet addiction.

=== Theories based on development orientation ===
The word "development" has two meanings in this context; both the process and stages of development of Internet addictive behavior, and the development of the individual throughout the life cycle.

==== John Grohol's 3-stage model ====
The 3-stage model proposed by John Grohol suggests that Internet users would go through three stages:

1. Enchantment: This stage serves as the introduction to the Internet. Oftentimes, scholars will describe this phase as an obsession. The Internet fascinates those new to it. In the first stage, users might be excited and curious about the Internet, leading to an increase in the amount of time spent on the Internet.
2. Disillusionment: Users start avoiding something addictive. After devoting a long time to using the Internet, individuals might realize that they should not spend too much time on the Internet, so they may reject games or websites that might be addictive. This leads to a decline in the amount of usage.
3. Balance: Users regulate time spent using the Internet and achieve a balance between surfing and other activities. In the last stage, people might be able to manage their time online well and develop healthy online habits.

John suggested that the reason why many people were addicted to the Internet was that they were struggling with the first stage and needed help. Furthermore, he suggested in this model that everyone would eventually reach stage three. However, the amount of time it took to reach this point depended on the individual.

=== Effects of COVID-19 ===
A study conducted by Nassim Masaeli and Hadi Farhadi found that the prevalence of internet-based addictive behaviors during the COVID-19 pandemic increased compared to pre-pandemic levels. Specifically, the prevalence of IAD ranged from 4.7% to 51.6%, SMA ranged from 9.7% to 47.4%, and gaming addiction ranged from 4.4% to 32.4%. The authors also identified several risk factors that contribute to the development of internet-based addictive behaviors during the pandemic, including boredom, stress, anxiety, and social isolation. They also highlighted the importance of interventions to prevent and treat internet-based addictive behaviors during the pandemic. These interventions can include psychological therapies, educational interventions, and pharmacological treatments. The authors recommended that these interventions should be tailored to specific age groups and populations to maximize their effectiveness.

Another study that looked further into the effect of COVID-19 on the prevalence of IAD was "Internet Addiction Increases in the General Population During COVID‐19". The study looked at how the likely increase in stress related to COVID-19 induced quarantine contributed to an increase in IAD among the Chinese population. The study was conducted among 20,472 participants who were asked to fill out the Internet Addiction Test (IAT) online. The study ultimately shows that the overall prevalence of Internet addiction amounted to 36.7% among the general, and according to IAT scores the level of severe Internet addiction was 2.8%. The conclusion drawn was that the pandemic increased the prevalence and severity of Internet addiction among the general population in China.

== Related disorders ==
=== Problem gambling (online gambling disorder) ===
Risks to gamblers and their families of problematic gambling have increased with the advent of online gambling. This is particularly true for minors.

=== Video game addiction ===
Video game addiction (VGA), also known as gaming disorder or internet gaming disorder, is generally defined as a psychological addiction that is problematic, compulsive use of video games that results in significant impairment to an individual's ability to function in various life domains over a prolonged period of time.

=== Internet sex addiction ===
Internet sex addiction, also known as cybersex addiction, has been proposed as a sexual addiction characterized by virtual Internet sexual activity that causes serious negative consequences to one's physical, mental, social, and financial well-being.

=== Compulsive talking (communication addiction disorder) ===
Communication addiction disorder (CAD) is a supposed behavioral disorder related to the necessity of being in constant communication with other people, even when there is no practical necessity for such communication. CAD has been linked to Internet addiction. Users become addicted to the social elements of the Internet, such as Facebook and YouTube. Users become addicted to one-on-one or group communication in the form of social support, relationships, and entertainment. However, interference with these activities can result in conflict and guilt. This kind of addiction is called problematic social media use.

Social network addiction is a dependence of people by connection, updating, and control of their and their friend's social network page. For some people, in fact, the only important thing is to have a lot of friends in the network regardless if they are offline or only virtual; this is particularly true for teenagers as a reinforcement of egos. Sometimes teenagers use social networks to show their idealized image to others. However, other studies claim that people are using social networks to communicate their real personality and not to promote their idealized identity.

=== Compulsive virtual reality use ===
Compulsive use of virtual reality, often abbreviated as VR, is when users of VR headsets obsessively immerse themselves in VR environments, games, and/or social platforms. Currently, interactive virtual media (such as social networks) are referred to as virtual reality, whereas future virtual reality refers to computer-simulated, immersive environments or worlds. Experts warn about the dangers of virtual reality, and compare the use of virtual reality (both in its current and future form) to the use of drugs, bringing with these comparisons the concern that, like drugs, users could possibly become addicted to virtual reality.

=== Video streaming addiction ===
Video streaming addiction is an addiction to watching online video content, such as those accessed through free online video sharing sites such as YouTube, subscription streaming services such as Netflix, as well as livestreaming sites such as Twitch. The social nature of the internet has a reinforcing effect on the individual's consumption habits, as well as normalizing binge-watching behavior for enthusiasts of particular television series.

== Risk factors ==
=== Interpersonal difficulties ===
It is argued that interpersonal difficulties such as introversion, social problems, and poor face-to-face communication skills often lead to internet addiction. Internet-based relationships offer a safe alternative for people with aforementioned difficulties to escape from the potential rejections and anxieties of interpersonal real-life contact.

=== Social factors ===
Individuals who lack sufficient social connection and social support are found to run a higher risk of Internet addiction. They resort to virtual relationships and support to alleviate their loneliness. As a matter of fact, the most prevalent applications among Internet addicts are chat rooms, interactive games, instant messaging, or social media. Some empirical studies reveal that conflict between parents and children and not living with a mother significantly associated with IA after one year. Protective factors such as quality communication between parents and children and positive youth development are demonstrated, in turn, to reduce the risk of IA.

=== Psychological factors ===
Prior addictive or psychiatric history are found to influence the likelihood of being addicted to the Internet. Some individuals with prior psychiatric problems such as depression and anxiety turn to compulsive behaviors to avoid the unpleasant emotions and situation of their psychiatric problems and regard being addicted to the Internet as a safer alternative to substance addiction. But it is generally unclear from existing research which is the cause and which is the effect partially due to the fact that comorbidity is common among Internet addicts.

The most common co-morbidities that have been linked to IAD are major depressive disorder (MDD) and attention deficit hyperactivity disorder (ADHD). The rate of ADHD and IAD associating is as high as 51.6%. Symptoms of ADHD are positively correlated with symptoms of IAD.

Internet addicts with no previous significant addictive or psychiatric history are argued to develop an addiction to some of the features of Internet use: anonymity, easy accessibility, and its interactive nature.

=== Neurobiological factors ===
Like most other psychopathological conditions, Internet addiction belongs to the group of multifactorial polygenic disorders. For each specific case, there is a unique combination of inherited characteristics (nervous tissue structure, secretion, degradation, and reception of neuromediators), and many are extra-environment factors (family-related, social, and ethnic-cultural). One of the main challenges in the development of the bio-psychosocial model of Internet addiction is to determine which genes and neuromediators are responsible for increased addiction susceptibility.

A study conducted by Aviv Weinstein and Michel Lejoyeux (2020) titled "Neurobiological mechanisms underlying internet gaming disorder" highlights that IGD is associated with alterations in brain regions involved in reward processing, impulse control, decision-making, and executive functioning. These changes in neural activity may result in the persistent and excessive use of internet gaming and may contribute to the development of IGD. The study also highlights the role of neurotransmitters, such as dopamine, in the reinforcement and reward-seeking behavior associated with IGD. They suggest that the neurobiological mechanisms involved in IGD are similar to those observed in substance use disorders, and they propose a framework for understanding IGD as a behavioral addiction. The authors also discuss the potential implications of these findings for the treatment of IGD, suggesting that interventions targeting the neurobiological mechanisms underlying IGD may be effective in reducing problematic internet gaming behaviors.

=== Other factors ===
Parental educational level, age at first use of the Internet, and the frequency of using social networking sites and gaming sites are found to be positively associated with excessive Internet use among adolescents in some European countries, as well as in the USA.

== Identification ==
Identifying Internet addiction disorder is empirically difficult. Various screening instruments have been employed to detect Internet addiction disorder.

=== Initial indicators ===
A study conducted by Lori C. Soule, L. Wayne Shell, and Betty A. Kleen (2003) titled "Exploring Internet Addiction: Demographic Characteristics and Stereotypes of Heavy Internet Users" found that heavy internet users were more likely to be male and younger than non-heavy users. The study also found that heavy internet users were more likely to use the internet for gaming and entertainment purposes, rather than for work or education. It also went on further to suggest that heavy internet use may be related to certain personality traits, such as sensation-seeking and impulsivity, and highlight the need for further research to better understand the psychological factors that contribute to internet addiction. The study also highlights the need for interventions that target specific groups, such as young males who are heavy internet users, and that address the underlying factors that contribute to problematic internet use behaviors.

=== Difficulties with diagnosis ===
Given the newness of the Internet and the inconsistent definition of Internet addiction disorder, practical diagnosis is far from clear-cut. With the first research initiated by Kimberly S. Young in 1996, the scientific study of Internet addiction has merely existed for 30 years. A few obstacles are present in creating an applicable diagnostic method for Internet addiction disorder.

- Wide and extensive use of the Internet: Diagnosing Internet addiction is often more complex than substance addiction as internet use has largely evolved into being an integral or necessary part of human lives. The addictive or problematic use of the internet is thus easily masked or justified. Also, the Internet is largely a pro-social, interactive, and information-driven medium, while other established addiction behaviors such as gambling are often seen as a single, antisocial behavior that has very little socially redeeming value. Many so-called Internet addicts do not experience the same damage to health and relationships that are common to established addictions.
- High comorbidity: Internet addiction is often accompanied by other psychiatric disorders such as a personality disorder or intellectual disability. It is found that Internet addiction is accompanied by another DSM-IV diagnosis 86% of the time. In one study conducted in South Korea, 30% of the identified Internet addicts have accompanying symptoms such as anxiety or depression and another 30% have a second disorder such as attention deficit hyperactivity disorder (ADHD). Another study in South Korea found an average of 1.5 other diagnoses among adolescent internet addicts. Further, it is noted in the United States that many patients only resort to medical help when experiencing difficulties they attribute to other disorders. For many individuals, overuse or inappropriate use of the Internet is a manifestation of their depression, social anxiety disorders, impulse control disorders, or pathological gambling. It generally remains unclear from existing literature whether other psychiatric disorders is the cause or manifest of Internet addiction.

Despite the advocacy of categorizing Internet addiction as an established illness, neither DSM-IV (1995) nor DSM-5 (2013) considers Internet addiction as a mental disorder. A subcategory of IAD, Internet gaming disorder is listed in DSM-5 as a condition that requires more research in order to be considered as a full disorder in May 2013. The WHO's International Classification of Diseases (ICD-11) recognizes gaming disorder as an illness category. There is still considerable controversy over whether IAD should be included in the DSM-5 and recognized as a mental disease in general.

=== Screening instruments ===
==== DSM-based instruments ====
Most of the criteria utilized by research are adaptations of listed mental disorders (e.g., pathological gambling) in the Diagnostic and Statistical Manual of Mental Disorders (DSM) handbook.

Ivan K. Goldberg, who first broached the concept of Internet addiction in 1995, adopted a few criteria for IAD on the basis of DSM-IV, including "hoping to increase time on the network" and "dreaming about the network." By adapting the DSM-IV criteria for pathological gambling, Kimberly S. Young in 1998 proposed one of the first integrated sets of criteria, Diagnostic Questionnaire (YDQ), to detect Internet addiction. A person who fulfills any five of the eight adapted criteria would be regarded as Internet addicted:

1. Preoccupation with the Internet;
2. A need for increased time spent online to achieve the same amount of satisfaction;
3. Repeated efforts to curtail Internet use;
4. Irritability, depression, or mood liability when Internet use is limited;
5. Staying online longer than anticipated;
6. Putting a job or relationship in jeopardy to use the Internet;
7. Lying to others about how much time is spent online; and
8. Using the Internet as a means of regulating mood.

While Young's YDQ assessment for IA has the advantage of simplicity and ease of use, Keith W. Beard and Eve M. Wolf in 2001 further asserted that all of the first five and at least one of the final three criteria (in the order above) be met to delineate Internet addiction in order for a more appropriate and objective assessment.

Young further extended her eight-question YDQ assessment to the now most widely used Internet Addiction Test (IAT), which consists of 20 items with each on a five-point Likert scale. Questions included on the IAT expand upon Young's earlier eight-question assessment in greater detail and include questions such as "Do you become defensive or secretive when anyone asks you what you do online?" and "Do you find yourself anticipating when you go online again?". A complete list of questions can be found in Dr. Kimberly S. Young's 1998 book Caught in the Net: How to Recognize the Signs of Internet Addiction and A Winning Strategy for Recovery and Laura Widyanto and Mary McMurran's 2004 article titled The Psychometric Properties of the Internet Addiction Test. The Test score ranges from 20 to 100 and a higher value indicates a more problematic use of the Internet:

- 20–39 = average Internet users,
- 40–69 = potentially problematic Internet users, and
- 70–100 = problematic Internet users.

Over time, a considerable number of screening instruments have been developed to diagnose Internet addiction, including the Internet Addiction Test (IAT), the Internet-Related Addictive Behavior Inventory (IRABI), the Chinese Internet Addiction Inventory (CIAI), the Korean Internet Addiction Self-Assessment Scale (KS Scale), the Compulsive Internet Use Scale (CIUS), the Generalized Problematic Internet Use Scale (GPIUS), the Internet Consequences Scale (ICONS), and the Problematic Internet Use Scale (PIUS). Among others, the Internet Addiction Test (IAT) by Young (1998) exhibits good internal reliability and validity and has been used and validated worldwide as a screening instrument.

Although the various screening methods are developed from diverse contexts, four dimensions manifest themselves across all instruments:

- Excessive use: compulsive Internet use and excessive online time-use;
- Withdrawal symptoms: withdrawal symptoms including feelings such as depression and anger, given restricted Internet use;
- Tolerance: the need for better equipment, increased internet use, and more applications/software;
- Negative repercussions: Internet use caused negative consequences in various aspects, including problematic performance in social, academic, or work domains.

More recently, researchers Mark D. Griffiths in 2000 and Jason C. Northrup and colleagues in 2015 claim that Internet per se is simply the medium and that the people are in effect addicted to processes facilitated by the Internet. Based on Young's Internet Addiction Test (IAT), Northrup and associates further decompose the internet addiction measure into four addictive processes: Online video game playing, online social networking, online sexual activity, and web surfing. The Internet Process Addiction Test (IPAT) is created to measure the processes to which individuals are addicted.

Screening methods that heavily rely on DSM criteria have been accused of lacking consensus by some studies, finding that screening results generated from prior measures rooted in DSM criteria are inconsistent with each other. As a consequence of studies being conducted in divergent contexts, studies constantly modify scales for their own purposes, thereby imposing a further challenge to the standardization in assessing Internet addiction disorder.

==== Single-question instruments ====
Some scholars and practitioners also attempt to define Internet addiction by a single question, typically the time-use of the Internet. The extent to which Internet use can cause negative health consequences is, however, not clear from such a measure. The latter of which is critical to whether IAD should be defined as a mental disorder.

=== Neuroimaging techniques ===
Emergent neuroscience studies investigated the influence of problematic, compulsive use of the internet on the human brain. Neuroimaging studies revealed that IAD contributes to structural and functional abnormalities in the human brain, similar to other behavioral and substance additions. Therefore, objective non-invasive neuroimaging can contribute to the preliminary diagnosis and treatment of IAD.

==== Electroencephalography-based diagnosis ====
Using electroencephalography (EEG) readings allows identifying abnormalities in the electrical activity of the human brain caused by IAD. Studies revealed that individuals with IAD predominantly demonstrate increased activity in the theta and gamma band and decreased delta, alpha, and beta activity. Following these findings, studies identified a correlation between the differences in the EEG readings and the severity of IAD, as well as the extent of impulsivity and inattention.

=== Classification ===
As many scholars have pointed out, the Internet serves merely as a medium through which tasks of divergent nature can be accomplished. Treating disparate addictive behaviors under the same umbrella term is highly problematic.

A 1999 study asserts that Internet addiction is a broad term which can be decomposed into several subtypes of behavior and impulse control problems, namely,

- Cybersexual addiction: compulsive use of adult websites for cybersex and cyberporn (see Internet sex addiction)
- Cyber-relationship addiction: Over-involvement in online relationships
- Net compulsions: Obsessive online gambling, shopping or day-trading
- Information overload: Compulsive web surfing or database searches
- Computer addiction: Obsessive computer game playing (see Video game addiction)

For a more detailed description of related disorders please refer to the related disorders section above.

=== Public concern ===
Internet addiction has raised great public concern in Asia and some countries consider Internet addiction as one of the major issues that threatens public health, in particular among adolescents. Internet addiction has been seen as a growing concern among adolescents, with many spending a significant amount of time online and exhibiting problematic use behaviors such as compulsive internet use and withdrawal symptoms when offline. Certain demographic factors, such as gender and socioeconomic status, may be associated with higher rates of internet addiction.

Various factors may contribute to the development of Internet addiction, including individual factors such as depression, anxiety, and poor self-regulation, as well as environmental factors such as parental monitoring and peer influence. Poor academic performance, disrupted sleep patterns, and social isolation were found to be potential negative consequences of Internet addiction.

== Treatment ==
Current interventions and strategies used as treatments for Internet addiction stem from those practiced in substance abuse disorder. In the absence of "methodologically adequate research", treatment programs are not well corroborated. Psychosocial treatment is the approach most often applied. In practice, rehab centers usually devise a combination of multiple therapies.

=== Psychosocial treatment ===
==== Cognitive behavioral therapy ====
The cognitive behavioral therapy with Internet addicts (CBT-IA) is developed in analogy to therapies for impulse control disorder.

Several key aspects are embedded in this therapy:

- Learning time management strategies;
- Recognizing the benefits and potential harms of the Internet;
- Increasing self-awareness and awareness of others and one's surroundings;
- Identifying "triggers" of Internet "binge behavior", such as particular Internet applications, emotional states, maladaptive cognitions, and life events;
- Learning to manage emotions and control impulses related to accessing the Internet, such as muscles or breathing relaxation training;
- Improving interpersonal communication and interaction skills;
- Improving coping styles;
- Cultivating interests in alternative activities.

Three phases are implemented in the CBT-IA therapy:

1. Behavior modification to control Internet use: Examine both computer behavior and non-computer behavior and manage Internet addicts' time online and offline;
2. Cognitive restructuring to challenge and modify cognitive distortions: Identify, challenge, and modify the rationalizations that justify excessive Internet use;
3. Harm reduction therapy to address co-morbid issues: Address any co-morbid factors associated with Internet addiction, sustain recovery, and prevent relapse.

Symptom management of CBT-IA treatment has been found to sustain six months post-treatment.

==== Motivational interviewing ====
The motivational interviewing approach is developed based on therapies for alcohol abusers. This therapy is a directive, patient-centered counseling style for eliciting behavior change through helping patients explore and resolve ambivalence with a respectful therapeutic manner. It does not, however, provide patients with solutions or problem solving until patients' decision to change behaviors.

Several key elements are embedded in this therapy:

- Asking open-ended questions;
- Giving affirmations;
- Reflective listening

Other psychosocial treatment therapies include reality therapy, Naikan cognitive psychotherapy, group therapy, family therapy, and multimodal psychotherapy.

=== Medication ===
IAD may be associated with a co-morbidity, so treating a related disorder may also help in the treatment of IAD. When individuals with IAD were treated with certain antidepressants, the time online was reduced by 65% and cravings of being online also decreased. The antidepressants that have been most successful are selective serotonin reuptake inhibitors (SSRIs) such as escitalopram and the atypical antidepressant bupropion. A psychostimulant, methylphenidate, was also found to have beneficial effects. However, the available evidence on treatment of IAD is of very low quality at this time and well-designed trials are needed.

=== 12-step recovery programs ===
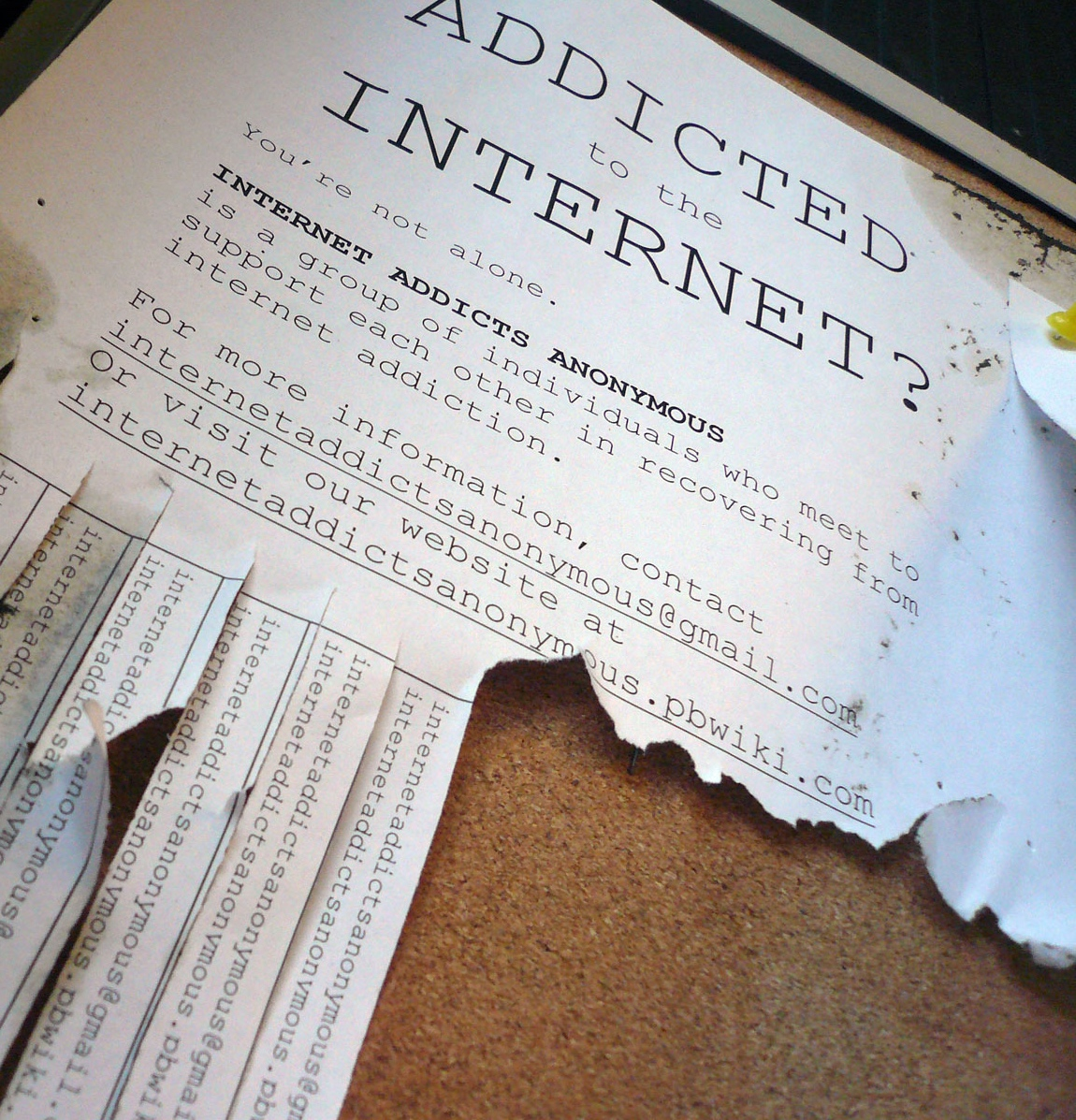
A 2009 flyer for an internet addiction support group in New York City

Gaming Addicts Anonymous, founded in 2014 is a 12-step program focused on recovery from computer gaming addiction.

Internet and Technology Addicts Anonymous (ITAA), founded in 2017, is a 12-step program supporting users coping with the problems resulting from compulsive internet and technology use. Some common sub-addictions include smartphone addiction, binge watching addiction, and social media addiction. There are face-to-face meetings in some cities. Telephone / online meetings take place every day of the week, at various times (and in various languages) that allow people worldwide to attend.

Similar to 12-step fellowships related to behavioral addictions, such as Overeaters Anonymous, Workaholics Anonymous, or Sex and Love Addicts Anonymous, most members do not define sobriety as avoiding all technology use altogether. Instead, most ITAA members come up with their own definitions of abstinence or problem behaviors, such as not using the computer or internet at certain hours or locations or not going to certain websites or categories of websites that have proven problematic in the past. They refer to these problematic behaviors as "bottom lines". In contrast, "top lines" are activities, both online and offline, they can do to enhance self esteem without falling into compulsive use. "Middle lines" are behaviors that may be OK sometimes, but can lead to bottom lines if a user is not careful. Meetings provide a source of live support for people, to share struggles and victories, and to learn to better function in life once less of it is spent on problematic technology use.

Media Addicts Anonymous (MAA), founded in 2020, is a 12-step program focused on recovery from media addiction. All forms of media sobriety are supported, including abstinence from electronic media, films, radio, newspapers, magazines, books, and music.

=== Dopamine-hit sites ===
In 2026, sites that replicate common app interfaces without having the real functionality of the app, known as Dopamine-hit sites, began trending in South Korea. Dopamine-hit sites that replicate social media interfaces include ChillSpace.

=== Behavioral self-management ===
Behavioral self-management strategies used in psychological interventions include monitoring internet use, setting goals and developing emotional regulation. These strategies aim to strengthen coping skills and support more controlled patterns of internet use. Several digital tools, such as AppBlock or Freedom, offer ways to implement planned limits, including scheduled restrictions on access to selected apps.

== Prevalence ==
Research-based prevalence rate of Internet addiction
Country or region	Rate or population	Sample	Year	Instrument
Global	6%	A meta-analysis-based estimate	1994–2012	YDQ & IAT
Asia	20%			
Pakistan	9%	231 Medical students	2020	IAT
China	10.4%	10,158 adolescents	2016	IAT
Hong Kong	17–26.7%	Over 3000 high school students	2009–2015	IAT
Taiwan	13.8%	1708 high school students	n.a.	YDQ
South Korea	2.1%	An estimate based on Korean population aged 6–19 years	2006	
Japan	2.0%	853 adolescents aged 12–15 years	2014	IAT
Europe	4.4%	11,956 adolescents in 11 European countries	2009–2010	YDQ
Germany	1.5 million	An estimate based on German population	n.a.	
Spain	16.3%	40,955 school adolescents aged 12–17 years	2016	PIUS-a
Norway	0.7%	3399 individuals aged 16–74 years	2007	YDQ
United Kingdom	18.3%	371 university students	n.a.	PIUS
Russia	7.1%	4,615 adolescents aged 12–18 years	2019	CIAS
North America				
United States	0.3–0.7%	2513 adults	2004	Non-standard

Different samples, methodologies, and screening instruments are employed across studies.

== Terminology ==
The notion of "Internet addictive disorder" was initially conjured up by Ivan K. Goldberg in 1995 as a joke to parody the complexity and rigidity of the American Psychiatric Association's (APA) Diagnostic and Statistical Manual of Mental Disorders (DSM). In his first narration, Internet addictive disorder was described as having the symptoms of "important social or occupational activities that are given up or reduced because of Internet use", "fantasies or dreams about the Internet", and "voluntary or involuntary typing movements of the fingers".

The definition of Internet addiction disorder has troubled researchers ever since its inception. In general, no standardized definition has been provided despite that the phenomenon has received extensive public and scholarly interest.

In 1998, Jonathan J. Kandell defined Internet addiction as "a psychological dependence on the Internet, regardless of the type of activity once logged on."

English psychologist Mark D. Griffiths, also in 1998, conceived of Internet addiction as a subtype of broader technology addiction, and also a subtype of behavioral addictions.

In recent years, the validity of the term "Internet addiction" as a single psychological construct has been criticized, as new empirical evidence is emerging to support this view. Griffiths himself now views "Internet addiction" to be a misnomer, writing "Internet addicts and smartphone addicts are no more addicted to the Internet or their smartphones than alcoholics are addicted to bottles".

== Society and culture ==
Internet addiction has raised great public concern in Asia and some countries consider Internet addiction as one of the major issues that threatens public health, in particular among adolescents.

=== China ===
Internet addiction is commonly referred to as "electronic opium" or "electronic heroin" in China. A government entity in China became the first governmental body worldwide to recognize internet addiction when it established "Clinical Diagnostic Criteria for Internet Addiction" in 2008. China's Ministry of Health does not formally recognize Internet addiction as a medical condition.

As a result of public outcry over parent-child online gaming conflicts, the government issued legislation. In 2002, the government passed legislation which forbid Internet cafes from allowing minors. The Law on Protection of Minors was amended in 2006 to state that the family and the state should guide minors' online behavior. These amendments place "indulgence in the Internet" on par with misbehaviors like smoking and vagrancy. The government has enacted other policies to regulate adolescents' Internet use, including limiting daily gaming time to 3 hours and requiring users' identification in online video games.

==== Mistreatment and abuse ====
Internet addiction camps in China are private or semi-private. The first such treatment center was founded in 2005. In the absence of guidance from the Ministry of Health and a clear definition of Internet addiction, dubious treatment clinics have sprouted up in the country. As part of the treatment, some clinics and camps impose corporal punishment upon patients of Internet addiction and some conducted electroconvulsive therapy (ECT) against patients, the latter of which has caused wide public concern and controversy.

=== South Korea ===
Being almost universally connected to the Internet and boasting online gaming as a professional sport, South Korea deems Internet addiction one of the most serious social issues and describes it as a "national crisis". Nearly 80% of the South Korean population have smartphones. As of 2013, according to government data, about two million of the country's population (less than 50 million) have Internet addiction problem, and approximately 680,000 10–19-year-olds are addicted to the Internet, accounting for roughly 10% of the teenage population. Even the very young generation are faced with the same problem: Approximately 40% of South Korean children between age three to five are using smartphones over three times per week. According to experts, if children are constantly stimulated by smartphones during infancy period, their brain will struggle to balance growth and the risk of Internet addiction.

It is believed that due to Internet addiction, many tragic events have happened in South Korea: A mother, tired of playing online games, killed her three-year-old son. A couple, obsessed with online child-raising games, let their young daughter die of malnutrition. A 15-year-old teenager killed his mother for not letting him play online games and then committed suicide. One Internet gaming addict stabbed his sister after playing violent games. Another addict killed one and injured seven others.

In response, the South Korea government has launched the first Internet prevention center in the world, the Jump Up Internet Rescue School, where the most severely addicted teens are treated with full governmental financial aid. As of 2007, the government has built a network of 140 Internet-addiction counseling centers besides treatment programs at around 100 hospitals. Typically, counselor- and instructor-led music therapy and equine therapy and other real-life group activities including military-style obstacle courses and therapeutic workshops on pottery and drumming are used to divert IAs' attention and interest from screens.

In 2011, the Korean government introduced the "Shutdown law", also known as the "Cinderella Act", to prevent children under 16 years old from playing online games from midnight (12:00) to 6 a.m.

=== Japan ===
Many cases of social withdrawal have been occurring in Japan since the late 1990s which inclines people to stay indoors most of the time. The term used for this is hikikomori, and it primarily affects the youth of Japan in that they are less inclined to leave their residences. Internet addiction can contribute to this effect because of how it diminishes social interactions and gives young people another reason to stay at home for longer. Many of the hikikomori people in Japan are reported to have friends in their online games, so they will experience a different kind of social interaction which happens in a virtual space.

=== US lawsuits ===
In the 2020s, multiple lawsuits have been filed in US courts by US states, US school districts and others asserting that social media platforms are deliberately designed to be addictive to minors and seeking damages. These lawsuits include:

- In October 2023, several public school systems in Maryland joined to sue Meta Platforms, Snapchat, ByteDance, and Google, claiming that these companies knowingly cause harm to students by providing addictive social media platforms. This lawsuit was one of many filed in the US as part of a mass action with many other entities around the US filing similar lawsuits. According to attorneys representing the plaintiffs, these lawsuits, may or may not be combined into a class action. These lawsuits were in part inspired by the success of a similar lawsuit against Juul Labs, makers of electronic cigarettes that were marketed to minors. It is expected that the defendant social media companies will seek to have these cases dismissed.
- In October 2023, Maryland, Virginia, and Washington, D.C. filed federal and state lawsuits against Facebook and Instagram, claiming that those platforms are designed to get children and teens addicted to social media. Meta Platforms, the parent company of Facebook and Instagram, responded that they have implemented many safety features and are disappointed that the states have not worked cooperatively with them.
- In February 2024, the city of New York filed a lawsuit in the California Superior Court against Facebook, Instagram, TikTok, Snapchat, and YouTube, seeking to have the companies' behavior declared a public nuisance and seeking monetary damages. The tech companies have responded that they have policies and procedures in place to ensure public safety.
- In September 2026, TikTok settled Alabama's lawsuit, and agreed to pay Alabama at least $100 million and implement additional platform safeguards for teenage users such as daily usage limits as well as more robust parental control and stronger age verification.

== See also ==
- Addictive personality
- Criticism of Facebook
- Cyberslacking
- Digital addict
- Digital detox
- Digital media use and mental health
- Evolutionary mismatch
- Instagram's impact on people
- List of repetitive strain injury software (i.e. break reminders)
- Media multitasking
- Nomophobia (i.e., fear of being without a phone)
- Psychological effects of Internet use
- Soft addiction
- Terminally online
- Workaholic
