= Maurice de Jong discography =

This article presents the complete oeuvre of Dutch multi-instrumentalist and composer Maurice de Jong, including his work as a band member and collaborating artist.

== As a solo artist ==
=== Astral ===
==== Studio albums ====
Released		Title
Year	Month	Title
1994	Jan	We the Unclean Shall Flourish / The Celestial Nightmare

=== The Nefarious Cult ===
==== Studio albums ====
Released		Title
Year	Month	Title
1997	Jun	Initiation of the Nefarious Throne

=== Ophiuchus ===
==== Studio albums ====
Released		Title
Year	Month	Title
1998	Jun	Nihilistic Cosmic Concept
2010	Oct	I Am Thou Art They Will

=== De Magia Veterum ===
==== Studio albums ====
Released		Title
Year	Month	Title
2005	Jun	Spikes Through Eyes
2009	Jan	Migdal Bavel
2011	Feb	The Divine Antithesis
2012	Oct	The Deification
2017	Feb	Naked Swords into the Wombs of the Enemy

==== EPs ====
Released		Title
Year	Month	Title
2005	Sep	Clavicula Salomonis
2006	Sep	The Blood of Prophet and Saints
2007	May	The Apocalyptic Seven Headed Beast Arisen
2010	Sep	In Conspectu Divinae Majestatis

=== Gnaw Their Tongues ===
==== Studio albums ====
Released		Title
Year	Month	Title
2006	Jan	Spit at Me and Wreak Havoc on My Flesh
2007	Sep	Reeking Pained and Shuddering
2007	Dec	An Epiphanic Vomiting of Blood
2009	Sep	All the Dread Magnificence of Perversity
2010	Sep	L'arrivée de la terne mort triomphante
2011	Nov	Per Flagellum Sanguemque, Tenebras Veneramus
2012	Jun	Eschatological Scatology
2015	Aug	Abyss of Longing Throats
2016	Dec	Hymns for the Broken, Swollen and Silent
2018	Feb	Genocidal Majesty
2018	Nov	Kapmeswonden en haatliederen
2019	Mar	An Eternity of Suffering, an Eternity of Pain
2020	Apr	I Speak the Truth, Yet with Every Word Uttered, Thousands Die
2023	Nov	The Cessation of Suffering

==== EPs ====
Released		Title
Year	Month	Title
2006	Feb	Horse Drawn Hearse
2007	Jul	...Prefering Human Skin Over Animal Fur...
2007	Aug	Die Mutter wählt das Todtenkleidchen
2007	Aug	Issei Sagawa
2007	Nov	Dawn Breaks Open Like a Wound That Bleeds Afresh
2007	Nov	Bubonic Burial Rites
2008	Mar	Devotion
2008	Jul	My Womb Is Barren
2008	Sep	For All Slaves a Song of False Hope
2008	Oct	The Genocidal Deliverance
2009	May	Rend Each Other Like Wild Beasts, Till Earth Shall Reek With Midnight Massacre
2010	Jan	Dimlit Hate Cellar
2010	Jan	Kaolo
2010	Mar	Tsutomu Miyazaki
2013	Feb	Sulfur
2014	Oct	Wir essen Seelen in der Nacht
2016	Mar	Blood Rites of the Hex Temple
2016	Jun	Wenn die leere Seele zur Hölle fährt
2016	Nov	Forest / Rapture
2017	Oct	Chambers of Tuam
2017	Oct	A Raven Flew Over the Land of the Beheaded Children
2018	May	Aan het licht teruggeven

==== Collaborative albums ====
Released		Title	Notes
Year	Month	Title	Notes
2008	Feb	Constructing Enochian Temples / Mary Magdalene	With Sick to the Back Teeth
2008	Aug	narcosa_ / Gnaw Their Tongues	With narcosa_
2009	May	Gnaw Their Tongues / Lunar Miasma / Mrtyu / Xela	With Lunar Miasma, Mrtyu and Xela
2009	Dec	A Confession of Worshipping the Depraved and Perverse Human Psyche in an Insalubrious and Pathological Context	With Painforged
2010	Jan	In Hoc Signo Vinces	With The Arm and Sword of a Bastard God, Halo of the Sun and The Slaughtered Lamb
2012	Feb	Corephallism / Gnaw Their Tongues	With Corephallism
2012	Apr	Demonologists / Gnaw Their Tongue	With Demonologists
2012	June	Mars	With Ancestry, Don Yule and Alex Mein Smith
2014	Jan	Dyodyo Asema	With Alkerdeel
2015	Nov	NV	With Dragged into Sunlight
2017	Apr	Gnaw Their Tongues / Bismuth	With Bismuth

==== Compilation albums ====
Year	Title
2007	Deathdrone 3
2007	...Spasming and Howling, Bowels Loosening and Bladders Emptying, Vomiting Helplessly...
2010	The Blotched and the Unwanted
2015	Collected Atrocities 2005–2008

=== Temple Of Will ===
==== EPs ====
Released		Title
Year	Month	Title
2011	Jan	Sacred Blood

=== Cloak of Altering ===
==== Studio albums ====
Released		Title
Year	Month	Title
2011	Jun	The Night Comes Illuminated With Death
2012	Oct	Ancient Paths Through Timeless Voids
2014	Apr	Plague Beasts
2015	Dec	Manifestation
2017	Mar	I Reached for the Light that Drowned in Your Mouth
2018	Sep	Zero Devil

==== EPs ====
Released		Title
Year	Month	Title
2013	Nov	NONE

=== Seirom ===
==== Studio albums ====
Released		Title
Year	Month	Title
2011	Jun	Eremitic
2012	Nov	1973
2014	May	And the Light Swallowed Everything
2016	Jul	I Was So Sad

==== EPs ====
Released		Title
Year	Month	Title
2011	Jul	Seiromistkrieg
2011	Dec	Forest
2013	Feb	Goodbye Cold Nights
2013	Apr	Sparkle Night
2013	Dec	December Sleep
2014	Jul	Strandheem '92
2015	Feb	Mesmerized
2015	Dec	Sunday Rain

=== Malorum ===
==== Studio albums ====
Released		Title
Year	Month	Title
2012	Mar	Dominum Omnium Malorum

=== Pyriphlegethon ===
==== Studio albums ====
Released		Title
Year	Month	Title
2015	Mar	Night of Consecration
2017	Apr	The Murky Black of Eternal Night

==== EPs ====
Released		Title
Year	Month	Title
2014	Aug	Rivers of the Infernal Kingdom

=== Caput Mortuum ===
==== Studio albums ====
Released		Title
Year	Month	Title
2015	Dec	His Sombre Wrath
2017	May	Cold Winds On The Bare Mountain

==== EPs ====
Released		Title
Year	Month	Title
2015	Nov	Cult Of Doom
2018	April	Return Of The Sinister

=== Canticle ===
==== Studio albums ====
Released		Title
Year	Month	Title
2016	Jul	The Light of Christ / The Sword of Christ

=== Offerbeest ===
==== Studio albums ====
Released		Title
Year	Month	Title
2017	Feb	Black Teeth

==== EPs ====
Released		Title
Year	Month	Title
2018	May	disease

=== Hagetisse ===
==== Studio albums ====
Released		Title
Year	Month	Title
2017	Sep	Werg Devoot
2017	Nov	Godendraak
2017	Dec	The Sinister Flight Of Cursed Souls Through Eternal Night

== With a band ==
=== Aderlating ===
==== Studio albums ====
Released		Title
Year	Month	Title
2009	Feb	The Nectar of Perversity Springs From the Well of Repression
2010	Mar	Devotional Hymns
2011	Apr	Spear of Gold and Seraphim Bone, Part One
2013	May	Gospel of the Burning Idols
2013	Oct	Spear of Gold and Seraphim Bone, Part Two
2015	Dec	Hell Follows

==== EPs ====
Released		Title
Year	Month	Title
2010	Jan	Dying of the Light
2010	Oct	Dood
2012	Jun	The Golden Mass
2012	Dec	Wolven Nacht
2015	Feb	Gold Streams From the Angel's Throat Part 1

==== Collaborative albums ====
Released		Title	Notes
Year	Month	Title	Notes
2009	Oct	Defiler / Aderlating	With Defiler
2010	Jan	Nekrasov / Aderlating	With Nekrasov
2011	Jun	A Chorus of Beauties Sings to Me Through Slit Throats	With Theologian
2011	Jul	Curses and Conspiracies	With Actuary

=== It Only Gets Worse ===
==== Studio albums ====
Released		Title
Year	Month	Title
2015	Jun	Christian Country Home
2016	Oct	Angels
2018	Apr	Fireplace Road

==== EPs ====
Released		Title
Year	Month	Title
2011	Dec	It Only Gets Worse
2014	Jul	Creation Myths
2014	Oct	Buried Alive
2015	Feb	Love Songs
2015	Aug	Great Northern
2016	Nov	Seen The Devil

=== Mors Sonat ===
==== Studio albums ====
Released		Title
Year	Month	Title
2013	May	Comforts In Atrocity
