= ...Spasming and Howling, Bowels Loosening and Bladders Emptying, Vomiting Helplessly... =

Album by Gnaw Their Tongues

Compilation album by Gnaw Their Tongues
- Released: August 2007
- Recorded: 2004–2007
- Studios: De Bejaarde, Drachten, NL
- Genres: Black metal, dark ambient, drone, noise
- Length: 48:00

Gnaw Their Tongues chronology
Issei Sagawa (2007)	...Spasming and Howling, Bowels Loosening and Bladders Emptying, Vomiting Helplessly... (2007)	Reeking Pained and Shuddering (2007)

Maurice de Jong chronology
Issei Sagawa (2007)	...Spasming and Howling (2007)	Reeking Pained and Shuddering (2007)

...Spasming and Howling, Bowels Loosening and Bladders Emptying, Vomiting Helplessly... is a compilation album by Gnaw Their Tongues, independently released in August 2007. Intended as an entry point into the project's music until that point, the album comprises three previously released and three previously unreleased compositions.

== Track listing ==
All music is composed by Maurice de Jong.

No.	Title	From album (date)	Length
1.	"Totentanz/Kindergrab"		7:36
2.	"Sound the Horns, the Water Is Poisoned"		6:57
3.	"Nihilism; Tied Up and Burning"	Deathdrone 3 (2007)	6:39
4.	"Chinese Torture Worship"	Horse Drawn Hearse (2006)	8:18
5.	"Horse Drawn Hearse"	Spit at Me and Wreak Havoc on My Flesh (2006)	9:50
6.	"Seven Heads, Ten Horns"		8:40

== Personnel ==
Adapted from the ...Spasming and Howling, Bowels Loosening and Bladders Emptying, Vomiting Helplessly... liner notes.

- Maurice de Jong (as Mories) – vocals, instruments, recording, cover art

== Release history ==
Region	Date	Label	Format
Netherlands	2007	self-released	Digital
