= ...Prefering Human Skin Over Animal Fur... =

EP by Gnaw Their Tongues
- Released: July 2007
- Recorded: 2007
- Studios: De Bejaarde, Drachten, NL
- Genres: Black metal, dark ambient, noise
- Length: 25:49
- Label: Epicene Replica

Gnaw Their Tongues chronology
Deathdrone 3 (2007)	...Prefering Human Skin Over Animal Fur... (2007)	Die Mutter wählt das Todtenkleidchen (2007)

Maurice de Jong chronology
The Apocalyptic Seven Headed Beast Arisen (2007)	...Prefering Human Skin Over Animal Fur... (2007)	Die Mutter wählt das Todtenkleidchen (2007)

...Prefering [sic] Human Skin Over Animal Fur... is an EP by Gnaw Their Tongues, released in July 2007 by Epicene Sound Replica. The album would appear in its entirety on the compilation Collected Atrocities 2005–2008, released in 2015.

== Track listing ==
All music is composed by Maurice de Jong.

Side one
No.	Title	Length
1.	"Prefering Human Skin Over Animal Fur"	12:23

Side two
No.	Title	Length
1.	"Spasming and Howling"	7:52
2.	"Glorification of Rats"	5:34

== Personnel ==
Adapted from the ...Prefering Human Skin Over Animal Fur... liner notes.

- Maurice de Jong (as Mories) – vocals, instruments, recording, cover art

== Release history ==
Region	Date	Label	Format	Catalog
United States	2007	Epicene Replica	CS	ESR074
Netherlands	2007	self-released	CD	
