= Deathdrone 3 =

Compilation album by Gnaw Their Tongues
- Released: 2007
- Recorded: 2005 – 2006
- Studios: De Bejaarde, Drachten, NL
- Genres: Black metal, dark ambient, drone, noise
- Length: 32:55

Gnaw Their Tongues chronology
Horse Drawn Hearse (2006)	Deathdrone 3 (2007)	...Prefering Human Skin Over Animal Fur... (2007)

Maurice de Jong chronology
The Blood of Prophet and Saints (2006)	Deathdrone 3 (2007)	The Apocalyptic Seven Headed Beast Arisen (2007)

Deathdrone 3 is a compilation album by Gnaw Their Tongues, independently released in 2007. The album comprises remixed recordings made during 2005 and 2006 that weren't compatible with the music of Spit at Me and Wreak Havoc on My Flesh and Horse Drawn Hearse. The compositions "Nihilism; Tied Up and Burning", "Anhedonia" (later re-titled "The Evening Wolves") and "Destroying Is Creating" later appeared on Gnaw Their Tongues' second full-length album Reeking Pained and Shuddering.

== Track listing ==
All music is composed by Maurice de Jong.

No.	Title	Length
1.	"Nihilism; Tied Up and Burning"	6:40
2.	"Anhedonia"	4:54
3.	"Destroying Is Creating"	7:30
4.	"Diagnostic and Statistical Manual of Mental Disorders"	5:36
5.	"The Planets Align and Nothing Happens"	4:39
6.	"[untitled]"	3:36

== Personnel ==
Adapted from the Deathdrone 3 liner notes.

- Maurice de Jong (as Mories) – vocals, instruments, recording, cover art

== Release history ==
Region	Date	Label	Format
Netherlands	2007	self-released	CD
