= Forest (Seirom EP) =

EP by Seirom
- Released: December 25, 2011
- Studio: De Bejaarde, Drachten, NL
- Genre: Dark ambient
- Length: 19:51

Seirom chronology
Seiromistkrieg (2011)	Forest (2011)	1973 (2012)

Maurice de Jong chronology
Per Flagellum Sanguemque, Tenebras Veneramus (2011)	Forest (2011)	Eschatological Scatology (2012)

Forest is an EP by Seirom, independently released on December 25, 2011.

== Track listing ==
All music is composed by Maurice de Jong.

No.	Title	Length
1.	"First Snow"	6:46
2.	"Soil"	8:06
3.	"Morning"	4:59

== Personnel ==
Adapted from the Forest liner notes.

- Maurice de Jong (as Mories) – guitar, bass guitar, drums, piano, synthesizer, recording, cover art
- Aaron Martin – cello (1)

== Release history ==
Region	Date	Label	Format
Netherlands	2011	self-released	Digital
