= Tsutomu Miyazaki (EP) =

EP by Gnaw Their Tongues
- Released: March 3, 2010
- Recorded: January – February 2010
- Studio: De Bejaarde, Drachten, NL
- Genre: Dark ambient, industrial
- Length: 29:07
- Label: Hell Lies in Others

Gnaw Their Tongues chronology
Kaolo (2010)	Tsutomu Miyazaki (2010)	The Blotched and the Unwanted (2010)

Maurice de Jong chronology
Kaolo (2010)	Tsutomu Miyazaki (2010)	The Blotched and the Unwanted (2010)

Tsutomu Miyazaki is an EP by Gnaw Their Tongues, released on March 3, 2010 by Hell Lies in Others. The album takes its name from Tsutomu Miyazaki, a Japanese serial killer who abducted and murdered four young girls. The music is thematically similar to 2007's Issei Sagawa, which was also based on a Japanese criminal.

== Track listing ==
All music is composed by Maurice de Jong

Side one
No.	Title	Length
1.	"Erika. Cold. Cough. Throat. Rest. Death."	7:02
2.	"Mari. Cremated. Bones. Investigate. Prove."	7:36

Side two
No.	Title	Length
1.	"Tsutomu Miyazaki"	14:29

== Personnel ==
Adapted from the Tsutomu Miyazaki liner notes.

- Maurice de Jong (as Mories) – vocals, instruments, recording, cover art

== Release history ==
Region	Date	Label	Format	Catalog
	2010	Hell Lies in Others	CS	HLIO01
