= Horse Drawn Hearse =

EP by Gnaw Their Tongues
- Released: February 2006
- Recorded: 2005 – 2006
- Studios: De Bejaarde, Drachten, NL
- Genres: Black metal, dark ambient, noise
- Length: 27:55

Gnaw Their Tongues chronology
Spit at Me and Wreak Havoc on My Flesh (2006)	Horse Drawn Hearse (2006)	Deathdrone 3 (2007)

Maurice de Jong chronology
Spit at Me and Wreak Havoc on My Flesh (2006)	Horse Drawn Hearse (2006)	The Blood of Prophet and Saints (2006)

Horse Drawn Hearse is an EP by Gnaw Their Tongues, independently released in February 2006. It would appear in its entirety on the compilation Collected Atrocities 2005–2008, released in 2015.

== Track listing ==
All music is composed by Maurice de Jong.

No.	Title	Length
1.	"The Behemoth Crawls Ashore"	10:54
2.	"Horse Drawn Hearse"	9:53
3.	"Another Study in Bleakness and Despair"	7:08

== Personnel ==
Adapted from the Horse Drawn Hearse liner notes.

- Maurice de Jong (as Mories) – vocals, instruments, recording, cover art

== Release history ==
Region	Date	Label	Format
Netherlands	2006	self-released	Digital
