= Die Mutter wählt das Todtenkleidchen =

EP by Gnaw Their Tongues
- Released: August 7, 2007
- Recorded: 2007
- Studio: De Bejaarde, Drachten, NL
- Genre: Black metal, dark ambient, noise
- Length: 30:16
- Label: Corps-Morts

Gnaw Their Tongues chronology
...Prefering Human Skin Over Animal Fur... (2007)	Die Mutter wählt das Todtenkleidchen (2007)	Issei Sagawa (2007)

Maurice de Jong chronology
...Prefering Human Skin Over Animal Fur... (2007)	Die Mutter wählt das Todtenkleidchen (2007)	Issei Sagawa (2007)

Die Mutter wählt das Todtenkleidchen is an EP by Gnaw Their Tongues, released on August 7, 2007 by Corps-Morts Records. The 2009 re-release coupled the album with the EP Dawn Breaks Open Like a Wound That Bleeds Afresh and three additional previously unreleased tracks.

== Track listing ==
All music is composed by Maurice de Jong

No.	Title	Length
1.	"Leichenbergen"	6:12
2.	"And the Waters Shall Prevail Upon the Earth"	6:36
3.	"29 Needles"	8:00
4.	"Die Mutter wählt das Todtenkleidchen"	9:28

2009 CD track listing
No.	Title	Length
1.	"Leichenbergen"	6:12
2.	"And the Waters Shall Prevail Upon the Earth"	6:37
3.	"Eaten by the Messenger of the Light"	7:55
4.	"Tod ist nur Tod"	4:46
5.	"29 Needles"	8:00
6.	"Die Mutter wählt das Todtenkleidchen"	9:30
7.	"Blood Drenched Altars"	4:56
8.	"Knife...Martyr...Despair"	8:14
9.	"Dawn Breaks Open Like a Wound That Bleeds Afresh"	10:17
10.	"I Am the Lord and There Is No Other; I Make the Light, I Create Darkness..."	8:12

== Personnel ==
Adapted from the Die Mutter wählt das Todtenkleidchen liner notes.

- Maurice de Jong (as Mories) – vocals, instruments, recording, cover art

== Release history ==
Region	Date	Label	Format	Catalog
Canada	2007	Corps-Morts	CD	CM8
United States	2009	Universal Consciousness	CD	U8C#20
