= For All Slaves a Song of False Hope =

EP by Gnaw Their Tongues
- Released: September 2008
- Recorded: 2008
- Studio: De Bejaarde, Drachten, NL
- Genre: Dark ambient
- Length: 58:43
- Label: Burning World

Gnaw Their Tongues chronology
My Womb Is Barren (2008)	For All Slaves a Song of False Hope (2008)	The Genocidal Deliverance (2008)

Maurice de Jong chronology
My Womb Is Barren (2008)	For All Slaves a Song of False Hope (2008)	The Genocidal Deliverance (2008)

For All Slaves a Song of False Hope is an EP by Gnaw Their Tongues, released in September 2008 by Burning World. The title of the track "Aderlating" would serve as the name of de Jong's band. The album would appear in its entirety on the compilation Collected Atrocities 2005–2008, released in 2015.

== Track listing ==
All music is composed by Maurice de Jong

No.	Title	Length
1.	"For All Slaves a Song of False Hope I"	8:56
2.	"The Uncomfortable Silence in Between Beatings"	9:36
3.	"A Fiery Deluge"	8:04
4.	"My Womb Is Barren and I Want Revenge"	9:06
5.	"Aderlating"	15:26
6.	"For All Slaves a Song of False Hope II"	7:35

== Personnel ==
Adapted from the For All Slaves a Song of False Hope liner notes.

- Maurice de Jong (as Mories) – vocals, instruments, recording, cover art

== Release history ==
Region	Date	Label	Format	Catalog
Netherlands	2008	Burning World	CD	BWR005
