= Strandheem '92 =

EP by Seirom
- Released: July 2, 2014
- Recorded: June 2014
- Studio: De Bejaarde II, Drachten, NL
- Genre: Shoegaze, dark ambient
- Length: 17:25

Seirom chronology
And the Light Swallowed Everything (2014)	Strandheem '92 (2014)	Mesmerized (2014)

Maurice de Jong chronology
And the Light Swallowed Everything (2014)	Strandheem '92 (2014)	Wir essen Seelen in der Nacht (2014)

Strandheem '92 is an EP by Seirom, independently released on July 2, 2014.

== Track listing ==
All music is composed by Maurice de Jong

No.	Title	Length
1.	"Strandheem" (C Major)	8:23
2.	"Strandheem" (A Major)	9:02

== Personnel ==
Adapted from the Strandheem '92 liner notes.

- Maurice de Jong (as Mories) – vocals, instruments, recording, cover art

== Release history ==
Region	Date	Label	Format
Netherlands	2014	self-released	Digital
