= Devotion (EP) =

EP by Gnaw Their Tongues
- Released: March 22, 2008
- Studios: De Bejaarde, Drachten, NL
- Genres: Dark ambient, noise, black metal
- Length: 26:54
- Label: At War With False Noise

Gnaw Their Tongues chronology
An Epiphanic Vomiting of Blood (2007)	Devotion (2008)	My Womb Is Barren (2008)

Maurice de Jong chronology
An Epiphanic Vomiting of Blood (2007)	Devotion (2008)	My Womb Is Barren (2008)

Devotion is an EP by Gnaw Their Tongues, released on March 22, 2008, by at War With False Noise.

== Track listing ==
All music is composed by Maurice de Jong.

No.	Title	Length
1.	"Devotion"	7:44
2.	"Cannibalis"	7:10
3.	"Lijkvocht"	5:34
4.	"Opgebaard"	6:26

== Personnel ==
Adapted from the Devotion liner notes.

- Maurice de Jong (as Mories) – vocals, instruments, recording, cover art

== Release history ==
Region	Date	Label	Format	Catalog
United Kingdom	2008	At War With False Noise	CD	atwar031
