= December Sleep =

EP by Seirom
- Released: December 25, 2013
- Recorded: October – December 2013
- Studios: De Bejaarde II, Drachten, NL
- Genres: Shoegaze, dark ambient
- Length: 15:36

Seirom chronology
Sparkle Night (2013)	December Sleep (2013)	And the Light Swallowed Everything (2014)

Maurice de Jong chronology
None (2013)	December Sleep (2013)	Dyodyo Asema (2014)

December Sleep is an EP by Seirom, independently released on December 25, 2013.

== Track listing ==
All music is composed by Maurice de Jong.

No.	Title	Length
1.	"Blanket"	5:23
2.	"Wall of Bells"	4:52
3.	"December Sleep"	5:21

== Personnel ==
Adapted from the December Sleep liner notes.

- Maurice de Jong (as Mories) – vocals, instruments, recording, cover art

== Release history ==
Region	Date	Label	Format
Netherlands	2013	self-released	Digital
