= Sunday Rain =

EP by Seirom
- Released: December 24, 2015
- Recorded: 2013 – 2015
- Studio: De Bejaarde II, Drachten, NL
- Genre: Dark ambient
- Length: 15:39

Seirom chronology
Mesmerized (2015)	Sunday Rain (2015)	I Was So Sad (2016)

Maurice de Jong chronology
Manifestation (2015)	Sunday Rain (2015)	His Sombre Wrath (2016)

Sunday Rain is an EP by Seirom, independently released on December 24, 2015.

== Track listing ==
All music is composed by Maurice de Jong

No.	Title	Length
1.	"Late Afternoon"	5:11
2.	"Old Things"	5:11
3.	"Sunday Rain"	5:17

== Personnel ==
Adapted from the Sunday Rain liner notes.

- Maurice de Jong (as Mories) – vocals, instruments, recording, cover art

== Release history ==
Region	Date	Label	Format
Netherlands	2015	self-released	Digital
