= Wenn die leere Seele zur Hölle fährt =

EP by Gnaw Their Tongues
- Released: June 30, 2016
- Recorded: 2013 – 2016
- Studio: De Bejaarde II, Drachten, NL
- Genre: Black metal
- Length: 14:59

Gnaw Their Tongues chronology
NV (2015)	Wenn die leere Seele zur Hölle fährt (2016)	Hymns for the Broken, Swollen and Silent (2016)

Maurice de Jong chronology
His Sombre Wrath (2015)	Wenn die leere Seele zur Hölle fährt (2016)	I Was So Sad (2016)

Wenn die leere Seele zur Hölle fährt is an EP by Gnaw Their Tongues, independently released on June 30, 2016.

== Track listing ==
All music is composed by Maurice de Jong.

No.	Title	Length
1.	"De sleur van de Dood"	5:40
2.	"Wenn die leere Seele zur Hölle fährt"	5:03
3.	"Thieves with Swollen Tongues"	4:16

== Personnel ==
Adapted from the Wenn die leere Seele zur Hölle fährt liner notes.

- Maurice de Jong (as Mories) – vocals, instruments, recording, cover art

== Release history ==
Region	Date	Label	Format
Netherlands	2016	self-released	Digital
