= The Blotched and the Unwanted =

Compilation album by Gnaw Their Tongues
- Released: April 27, 2010
- Recorded: 2006 – 2010
- Studio: De Bejaarde, Drachten, NL
- Genre: Dark ambient, noise, black metal
- Length: 68:03

Gnaw Their Tongues chronology
Tsutomu Miyazaki (2010)	The Blotched and the Unwanted (2010)	L'arrivée de la terne mort triomphante (2010)

Maurice de Jong chronology
Tsutomu Miyazaki (2010)	The Blotched and the Unwanted (2010)	In Conspectu Divinae Majestatis (2010)

The Blotched and the Unwanted is a compilation album by Gnaw Their Tongues, released on March 3, 2010 by Hell Lies in Others. The album comprises previously unreleased compositions recorded between 2006 and 2010.

== Track listing ==
All music is composed by Maurice de Jong

No.	Title	Length
1.	"Tomb"	2:44
2.	"Massgrave Hymn"	5:34
3.	"An Erotic Beheading"	5:11
4.	"Rape in Early Spring"	13:26
5.	"Bloedkorst"	3:48
6.	"[untitled]"	3:52
7.	"Lightless"	8:54
8.	"Scatological Meditation"	20:27
9.	"Prayer for the Bloodred Rain"	4:07

== Personnel ==
Adapted from The Blotched and the Unwanted liner notes.

- Maurice de Jong (as Mories) – vocals, instruments, recording, cover art

== Release history ==
Region	Date	Label	Format
Netherlands	2010	self-released	Digital
