= Goodbye Cold Nights =

EP by Seirom
- Released: February 3, 2013
- Recorded: 2011 – 2012
- Studio: De Bejaarde, Drachten, NL
- Genre: Dark ambient
- Length: 18:11

Seirom chronology
1973 (2012)	Goodbye Cold Nights (2013)	Sparkle Night (2013)

Maurice de Jong chronology
1973 (2012)	Goodbye Cold Nights (2013)	Sulfur (2013)

Goodbye Cold Nights is an EP by Seirom, independently released on February 2, 2013.

== Track listing ==
All music is composed by Maurice de Jong

No.	Title	Length
1.	"Goodbye Cold Nights"	4:19
2.	"Slowly Sinking Dreams"	4:48
3.	"The Black Earth Spread White With Rye"	4:24
4.	"I Am Going to Be the Mountain"	4:40

== Personnel ==
Adapted from the Goodbye Cold Nights liner notes.

- Maurice de Jong (as Mories) – vocals, instruments, recording, cover art

== Release history ==
Region	Date	Label	Format
Netherlands	2013	self-released	Digital
