= NV (album) =

Studio album by Dragged into Sunlight / Gnaw Their Tongues
- Released: November 13, 2015
- Recorded: 2011
- Genre: Black metal, death-doom
- Length: 32:21
- Label: Prosthetic
- Producer: Justin Broadrick, Tom Dring

Dragged into Sunlight chronology
Widowmaker (2012)	NV (2015)	Terminal Aggressor II (2020)

Gnaw Their Tongues chronology
Abyss of Longing Throats (2015)	NV (2015)	Wenn die leere Seele zur Hölle fährt (2016)

Maurice de Jong chronology
Abyss of Longing Throats (2015)	NV (2015)	Manifestation (2015)

Professional ratings
Review scores
Source	Rating
Pitchfork Media	(5.5/10)

NV is a collaborative studio album by Dragged into Sunlight and Gnaw Their Tongues, released on 13 November 2015 by Prosthetic Records. The music on NV is predominantly influenced by the album Streetcleaner by the British industrial metal band Godflesh, with Justin Broadrick, Godflesh's frontman, acting as producer for the album.

== Track listing ==
All music is composed by Dragged into Sunlight and Gnaw Their Tongues

No.	Title	Length
1.	"Visceral Repulsion"	5:50
2.	"Absolver"	7:54
3.	"Strangled With the Cord"	5:16
4.	"Omniscienza"	6:40
5.	"Alchemy in the Subyear"	6:41

== Personnel ==
Adapted from NV liner notes.

Musicians

- Dragged into Sunlight – instruments
- Maurice de Jong (as Mories) – instruments

Production and additional personnel

- Justin Broadrick – production
- Tom Dring – production
- Seldon Hunt – illustrations

== Release history ==
Region	Date	Label	Format	Catalog
United States	2015	Prosthetic	CD, LP	PROS102252
