= Wir essen Seelen in der Nacht =

Extended play by Gnaw Their Tongues

EP by Gnaw Their Tongues
- Released: November 1, 2014
- Recorded: 2011 – 2014
- Studio: De Bejaarde II, Drachten, NL
- Genre: Dark ambient, industrial
- Length: 18:41

Gnaw Their Tongues chronology
Dyodyo Asema (2014)	Wir essen Seelen in der Nacht (2014)	Collected Atrocities 2005–2008 (2015)

Maurice de Jong chronology
Strandheem '92 (2014)	Wir essen Seelen in der Nacht (2014)	Mesmerized (2015)

Wir essen Seelen in der Nacht is an EP by Gnaw Their Tongues, independently released on November 1, 2014.

== Track listing ==
All music is composed by Maurice de Jong

No.	Title	Length
1.	"A Calm Friday Evening in Hinterkaifeck"	2:54
2.	"Wir essen Seelen in der Nacht"	4:32
3.	"The Gate of Death"	5:44
4.	"Droom van de Rattenvreter"	5:31

== Personnel ==
Adapted from the Wir essen Seelen in der Nacht liner notes.

- Maurice de Jong (as Mories) – vocals, instruments, recording, mixing, mastering, cover art

== Release history ==
Region	Date	Label	Format
Netherlands	2014	self-released	Digital
