= Mesmerized (EP) =

EP by Seirom
- Released: February 1, 2015
- Recorded: Autumn – Winter 2014
- Studio: De Bejaarde II, Drachten, NL
- Genre: Dark ambient
- Length: 33:32
- Label: Ksenza

Seirom chronology
Strandheem '92 (2014)	Mesmerized (2015)	Sunday Rain (2015)

Maurice de Jong chronology
Wir essen Seelen in der Nacht (2014)	Mesmerized (2015)	Collected Atrocities 2005–2008 (2015)

Mesmerized is an EP by Seirom, released on February 1, 2015 by Ksenza Records.

== Track listing ==
All music is composed by Maurice de Jong

No.	Title	Length
1.	"Mesmerized"	5:44
2.	"Why Spring Came Late This Year"	4:18
3.	"Quiet Days"	4:46
4.	"Always Leave"	3:40
5.	"Desensitized"	5:33
6.	"I Was Guided Here by Rooks"	3:35
7.	"Something New"	5:53

== Personnel ==
Adapted from the Mesmerized liner notes.

- Maurice de Jong (as Mories) – vocals, instruments, recording, cover art

== Release history ==
Region	Date	Label	Format	Catalog
Russia	2015	Ksenza	CD	KSZ 006
