= Kaolo =

EP by Gnaw Their Tongues
- Released: January 2010
- Recorded: October 2009
- Studio: De Bejaarde, Drachten, NL
- Genre: Dark ambient, industrial, noise
- Length: 27:08

Gnaw Their Tongues chronology
Dimlit Hate Cellar (2010)	Kaolo (2010)	Tsutomu Miyazaki (2010)

Maurice de Jong chronology
Dimlit Hate Cellar (2010)	Kaolo (2010)	Tsutomu Miyazaki (2010)

Kaolo is an EP by Gnaw Their Tongues, independently released in January 2010.

== Track listing ==
All music is composed by Maurice de Jong.

No.	Title	Length
1.	"Kaolo"	5:20
2.	"Kaolo II"	10:14
3.	"The Heads of Beasts Needed Sex"	11:34

== Personnel ==
Adapted from the Kaolo liner notes.

- Maurice de Jong (as Mories) – vocals, instruments, recording, cover art

== Release history ==
Region	Date	Label	Format
Netherlands	2010	self-released	Digital
