= Sulfur (EP) =

EP by Gnaw Their Tongues
- Released: February 20, 2013
- Recorded: 2009
- Studio: De Bejaarde, Drachten, NL
- Genre: Dark ambient, industrial
- Length: 29:50

Gnaw Their Tongues chronology
Eschatological Scatology (2012)	Sulfur (2013)	Dyodyo Asema (2014)

Maurice de Jong chronology
Goodbye Cold Nights (2013)	Sulfur (2013)	Sparkle Night (2013)

Sulfur is an EP by Dutch experimental music group Gnaw Their Tongues, independently released on February 20, 2013. The music centers around the theme of World War I and the album artwork is a photograph depicting three Canadian soldiers wounded by mustard gas (otherwise known as sulfur mustard).

== Track listing ==
All music is composed by Maurice de Jong

No.	Title	Length
1.	"Creeps as Morning Mist"	5:17
2.	"From Shoulder to Waist"	10:34
3.	"Silence"	3:52
4.	"Choke"	10:07

== Personnel ==
Adapted from the Sulfur liner notes.

- Maurice de Jong (as Mories) – vocals, instruments, recording, cover art

== Release history ==
Region	Date	Label	Format
Netherlands	2013	self-released	Digital
