= Seiromistkrieg =

EP by Seirom
- Released: July 6, 2011
- Studio: De Bejaarde, Drachten, NL
- Genre: Dark ambient
- Length: 33:17

Seirom chronology
Eremitic (2011)	Seiromistkrieg (2011)	Forest (2011)

Maurice de Jong chronology
The Night Comes Illuminated With Death (2011)	Seiromistkrieg (2011)	Per Flagellum Sanguemque, Tenebras Veneramus (2011)

Seiromistkrieg is an EP by Seirom, independently released on July 6, 2011.

== Track listing ==
All music is composed by Maurice de Jong

No.	Title	Length
1.	"Istkrieg"	18:41
2.	"Istauchkrieg"	4:05
3.	"Istnichtkrieg"	10:31

== Personnel ==
Adapted from the Seiromistkrieg liner notes.

- Maurice de Jong (as Mories) – guitar, bass guitar, drums, piano, synthesizer, recording, cover art
- Aaron Martin – cello (3)

== Release history ==
Region	Date	Label	Format
Netherlands	2011	self-released	Digital
