= Cloak of Altering =

Black metal musical project

- Origin: Drachten, Friesland, Netherlands
- Genres: Black metal, avant-garde metal
- Years active: 2010–present
- Label: Crucial Blast
- Members: Maurice de Jong
- Website: www.devotionalhymns.com/cloak%20of%20altering.html

Cloak of Altering is a black metal musical project founded by Dutch multi-instrumentalist and composer Maurice "Mories" de Jong in 2010. The project was a continuation of his Ophiuchus project which began in the late nineties. Compared to de Jong's other projects, synthesizers and electronic music play a larger role in the compositions of Cloak of Altering. Seven full-length albums have been released: The Night Comes Illuminated With Death (2011), Ancient Paths Through Timeless Voids (2012), Plague Beasts (2014), Manifestation (2015), I Reached for the Light that Drowned in Your Mouth (2017), Zero Devil (2018) and Sheathed Swords Drip with Poisonous Honey (2021).

== History ==
Cloak of Altering is the continuation of the Ophiuchus project of the late nineties. The project debuted with The Night Comes Illuminated With Death in 2011. The second album Ancient Paths Through Timeless Voids was released in 2012. The third album Plague Beasts was released in 2014. The fourth album Manifestation was released in 2015. The fifth album I Reached for the Light that Drowned in Your Mouth was released in 2017.

== Discography ==
Studio albums

- The Night Comes Illuminated With Death (2011)
- Ancient Paths Through Timeless Voids (2012)
- Plague Beasts (2014)
- Manifestation (2015)
- I Reached for the Light that Drowned in Your Mouth (2017)
- Zero Devil (2018)
- Sheathed Swords Drip with Poisonous Honey (2021)

EPs

- None (2013)
