= Dyodyo Asema =

EP by Gnaw Their Tongues & Alkerdeel
- Released: January 13, 2014
- Recorded: Spring 2013
- Studio: De Bejaarde II, Drachten, NL
- Genre: Black metal, drone metal
- Length: 19:00

Gnaw Their Tongues & Alkerdeel chronology
Sulfur (2013)	Dyodyo Asema (2014)	Wir essen Seelen in der Nacht (2014)

Maurice de Jong chronology
December Sleep (2013)	Dyodyo Asema (2014)	Plague Beasts (2014)

Dyodyo Asema is a collaborative EP by Alkerdeel and Gnaw Their Tongues, released on January 13, 2014 by ConSouling Sounds.

== Track listing ==
All music is composed by Alkerdeel and Gnaw Their Tongues

No.	Title	Length
1.	"Dyodyo Asema"	19:00

== Personnel ==
Adapted from the Dyodyo Asema liner notes.

Musicians

- Lord QW – bass guitar
- Maurice de Jong (as Mories) – vocals, instruments, mixing, mastering
- Pede – vocals
- Pui – guitar
- Nieke – drums

Additional personnel

- Luchtrat – illustrations, design

== Release history ==
Region	Date	Label	Format	Catalog
United Kingdom	2014	ConSouling Sounds	CD, LP	Soul0033
