= The Genocidal Deliverance =

EP by Gnaw Their Tongues
- Released: October 16, 2008
- Studio: De Bejaarde, Drachten, NL
- Genre: Black metal
- Length: 9:59
- Label: At War With False Noise

Gnaw Their Tongues chronology
| For All Slaves a Song of False Hope (2008) | The Genocidal Deliverance (2008) | All the Dread Magnificence of Perversity (2009) |

Maurice de Jong chronology
| For All Slaves a Song of False Hope (2008) | The Genocidal Deliverance (2008) | Migdal Bavel (2009) |

The Genocidal Deliverance is an EP by Gnaw Their Tongues, released on October 16, 2008 by at War With False Noise.

== Track listing ==
All music is composed by Maurice de Jong

Side one
| No. | Title | Length |
|---|---|---|
| 1. | "The Genocidal Deliverance" | 5:15 |

Side two
| No. | Title | Length |
|---|---|---|
| 1. | "Dead Bird Prophecies" | 4:34 |

== Personnel ==
Adapted from The Genocidal Deliverance liner notes.

- Maurice de Jong (as Mories) – vocals, instruments, recording, cover art

== Release history ==
| Region | Date | Label | Format | Catalog |
|---|---|---|---|---|
| United Kingdom | 2008 | At War With False Noise | LP | atwar036 |
