= Bubonic Burial Rites =

EP by Gnaw Their Tongues
- Released: November 21, 2007
- Recorded: 2007
- Studios: De Bejaarde, Drachten, NL
- Genre: Dark ambient
- Length: 30:20

Gnaw Their Tongues chronology
Dawn Breaks Open Like a Wound That Bleeds Afresh (2007)	Bubonic Burial Rites (2007)	An Epiphanic Vomiting of Blood (2007)

Maurice de Jong chronology
Dawn Breaks Open Like a Wound That Bleeds Afresh (2007)	Bubonic Burial Rites (2007)	An Epiphanic Vomiting of Blood (2007)

Bubonic Burial Rites is an EP by Gnaw Their Tongues, independently released on November 21, 2007.

== Track listing ==
All music is composed by Maurice de Jong.

No.	Title	Length
1.	"Bubonic Burial Rites"	11:04
2.	"Vademecum Mutilus"	7:02
3.	"Tarred Coffins"	12:14

== Personnel ==
Adapted from the Bubonic Burial Rites liner notes.

- Maurice de Jong (as Mories) – vocals, instruments, recording, cover art

== Release history ==
Region	Date	Label	Format
Netherlands	2007	self-released	Digital
