= Dimlit Hate Cellar =

EP by Gnaw Their Tongues
- Released: January 4, 2010
- Recorded: 2004
- Studios: De Bejaarde, Drachten, NL
- Genre: Black metal
- Length: 14:48

Gnaw Their Tongues chronology
Rend Each Other Like Wild Beasts (2009)	Dimlit Hate Cellar (2010)	Kaolo (2010)

Maurice de Jong chronology
Rend Each Other Like Wild Beasts (2009)	Dimlit Hate Cellar (2010)	Kaolo (2010)

Dimlit Hate Cellar is an EP by Gnaw Their Tongues, independently released on January 4, 2010. The album compiles some of Gnaw Their Tongues' earliest recordings.

== Track listing ==
All music is composed by Maurice de Jong.

No.	Title	Length
1.	"Dimlit Hate Cellar"	3:26
2.	"Beast Worship"	3:06
3.	"Bloodrape Ritual"	3:36
4.	"Deep Seated Hate"	4:40

== Personnel ==
Adapted from the Dimlit Hate Cellar liner notes.

- Maurice de Jong (as Mories) – vocals, instruments, recording, cover art

== Release history ==
Region	Date	Label	Format
Netherlands	2010	self-released	Digital
