= My Womb Is Barren =

EP by Gnaw Their Tongues
- Released: July 24, 2008
- Studio: De Bejaarde, Drachten, NL
- Genre: Dark ambient, noise
- Length: 19:58

Gnaw Their Tongues chronology
| Devotion (2008) | My Womb Is Barren (2008) | For All Slaves a Song of False Hope (2008) |

Maurice de Jong chronology
| Devotion (2008) | My Womb Is Barren (2008) | For All Slaves a Song of False Hope (2008) |

My Womb Is Barren is an EP by Gnaw Their Tongues that was released on July 24, 2008 by at War With False Noise.

== Track listing ==
All music is composed by Maurice de Jong

| No. | Title | Length |
|---|---|---|
| 1. | "My Womb Is Barren And I Want Revenge II" | 19:58 |

== Personnel ==
Adapted from the My Womb Is Barren liner notes.

- Maurice de Jong (as Mories) – vocals, instruments, recording, cover art

== Release history ==
| Region | Date | Label | Format |
|---|---|---|---|
| Netherlands | 2008 | self-released | Digital |
