= Sparkle Night =

EP by Seirom
- Released: April 22, 2013
- Recorded: 2011 – 2012
- Studio: De Bejaarde, Drachten, NL
- Genre: Dark ambient
- Length: 19:05
- Label: Sulphurous

Seirom chronology
Goodbye Cold Nights (2013)	Sparkle Night (2013)	December Sleep (2013)

Maurice de Jong chronology
Sulfur (2013)	Sparkle Night (2013)	NONE (2013)

Sparkle Night is an EP by Dutch band Seirom, released on April 22, 2013 by Sulphurous Productions.

== Track listing ==
All music is composed by Maurice de Jong

Side one
No.	Title	Length
1.	"Sparkle Night"	9:50

Side two
No.	Title	Length
1.	"Only Miss You When It Snows"	9:15

== Personnel ==
Adapted from the Goodbye Cold Nights liner notes.

- Maurice de Jong (as Mories) – vocals, instruments, recording, cover art

== Release history ==
Region	Date	Label	Format	Catalog
Netherlands	2013	Sulphurous	CS	SULPH-001
