= Rend Each Other Like Wild Beasts, Till Earth Shall Reek With Midnight Massacre =

EP by Gnaw Their Tongues
- Released: May 16, 2009
- Recorded: Winter 2008
- Studio: De Bejaarde, Drachten, NL
- Genre: Dark ambient, noise
- Length: 39:27
- Label: At War With False Noise

Gnaw Their Tongues chronology
All the Dread Magnificence of Perversity (2009)	Rend Each Other Like Wild Beasts, Till Earth Shall Reek With Midnight Massacre (2009)	Dimlit Hate Cellar (2010)

Maurice de Jong chronology
All the Dread Magnificence of Perversity (2009)	Rend Each Other Like Wild Beasts (2009)	Dimlit Hate Cellar (2010)

Rend Each Other Like Wild Beasts, Till Earth Shall Reek With Midnight Massacre is an EP by Gnaw Their Tongues, released on May 16, 2009 by at War With False Noise.

== Track listing ==
All music is composed by Maurice de Jong

Side one
No.	Title	Length
1.	"Rend Each Other Like Wild Beasts, Till Earth Shall Reek With Midnight Massacre"	19:38

Side two
No.	Title	Length
1.	"Then Shall They Come, Oh Master, Shrieking From Red Battle Fields to People Thy Dark Realms"	11:43
2.	"In Sullen Silence Stalks Forth Pestilence"	8:06

== Personnel ==
Adapted from the Rend Each Other Like Wild Beasts, Till Earth Shall Reek With Midnight Massacre liner notes.

- Maurice de Jong (as Mories) – vocals, instruments, recording, cover art

== Release history ==
Region	Date	Label	Format	Catalog
United Kingdom	2009	At War With False Noise	LP	atwar056
