= Eremitic (album) =

Studio album by Seirom
- Released: June 6, 2011
- Studio: De Bejaarde, Drachten, NL
- Genre: Dark ambient
- Length: 40:37

Seirom chronology
| Eremitic (2011) | Seiromistkrieg (2011) |

Maurice de Jong chronology
| The Divine Antithesis (2011) | Eremitic (2011) | The Night Comes Illuminated With Death (2011) |

Eremitic is the debut full-length studio album of Seirom, independently released on June 6, 2011.

== Track listing ==
All music is composed by Maurice de Jong

| No. | Title | Length |
|---|---|---|
| 1. | "Eremitic" | 7:51 |
| 2. | "Bird Communication" | 5:32 |
| 3. | "Nacht" | 5:58 |
| 4. | "Pesthuis Beerput" | 7:09 |
| 5. | "Sacraments" | 5:51 |
| 6. | "Im Wald" | 8:16 |

== Personnel ==
Adapted from the Eremitic liner notes.

- Maurice de Jong (as Mories) – vocals, guitar, bass guitar, trumpet, drums, percussion, synthesizer, effects, recording, cover art

== Release history ==
| Region | Date | Label | Format |
|---|---|---|---|
| Netherlands | 2011 | self-released | Digital |
