= Dawn Breaks Open Like a Wound That Bleeds Afresh =

EP by Gnaw Their Tongues
- Released: November 2007
- Recorded: 2007
- Studios: De Bejaarde, Drachten, NL
- Genres: Dark ambient, noise, black metal
- Length: 23:25
- Label: Universal Tongue

Gnaw Their Tongues chronology
Reeking Pained and Shuddering (2007)	Dawn Breaks Open Like a Wound That Bleeds Afresh (2007)	Bubonic Burial Rites (2007)

Maurice de Jong chronology
Reeking Pained and Shuddering (2007)	Dawn Breaks Open Like a Wound That Bleeds Afresh (2007)	Bubonic Burial Rites (2007)

Dawn Breaks Open Like a Wound That Bleeds Afresh is an EP by Gnaw Their Tongues, released in November 2007 by Universal Tongue.

== Track listing ==
All music is composed by Maurice de Jong.

No.	Title	Length
1.	"Blood Drenched Altars"	4:55
2.	"Knife...Martyr...Despair"	8:15
3.	"Dawn Breaks Open Like a Wound That Bleeds Afresh"	10:15

== Personnel ==
Adapted from the Dawn Breaks Open Like a Wound That Bleeds Afresh liner notes.

- Maurice de Jong (as Mories) – vocals, instruments, recording, cover art

== Release history ==
Region	Date	Label	Format	Catalog
Portugal	2007	Universal Tongue	CD	UT06
