= Ancient Paths Through Timeless Voids =

Studio album by Cloak of Altering
- Released: October 30, 2012
- Recorded: 2012
- Studios: De Bejaarde, Drachten, NL
- Genres: Avant-garde metal, black metal
- Length: 39:25

Cloak of Altering chronology
The Night Comes Illuminated With Death (2011)	Ancient Paths Through Timeless Voids (2012)	NONE (2013)

Maurice de Jong chronology
The Deification (2012)	Ancient Paths Through Timeless Voids (2012)	1973 (2012)

Ancient Paths Through Timeless Voids is the second full-length studio album by Cloak of Altering, independently released on October 30, 2012.

== Track listing ==
All music is composed by Maurice de Jong.

No.	Title	Length
1.	"A Plague Has Travelled With Us"	5:10
2.	"All I See Is Dead Stars"	7:10
3.	"Ancient Paths Through Timeless Voids"	5:38
4.	"Separatist Declaration"	2:12
5.	"Devoided"	6:17
6.	"Initiation Rites of Sector Five"	5:07
7.	"The War Has Finally Found Us"	7:51

== Personnel ==
Adapted from Ancient Paths Through Timeless Voids liner notes.

- Maurice de Jong (as Mories) – vocals, instruments, recording, cover art

== Release history ==
Region	Date	Label	Format
Netherlands	2012	self-released	Digital
