= The Deification =

Studio album by De Magia Veterum
- Released: October 22, 2012
- Recorded: 2011
- Studio: De Bejaarde, Drachten, NL
- Genre: Avant-garde metal, black metal
- Length: 29:56
- Label: Transcendental Creations

De Magia Veterum chronology
The Divine Antithesis (2011)	The Deification (2012)

Maurice de Jong chronology
Eschatological Scatology (2012)	The Deification (2012)	Ancient Paths Through Timeless Voids (2012)

The Deification is the fourth studio album by De Magia Veterum, released on October 22, 2012 by Transcendental Creations.

== Critical reception ==
Professional ratings
Review scores
Source	Rating
AllMusic	4/5 stars

Music journalist Ned Raggett of AllMusic says, "the roars of blastbeats and distorted vocals are there as ever, but it's much more of a shuddering wave than complete destruction, a slow, perfect crushing that finally pauses before roaring back even more skitterishly."

== Track listing ==
All music is composed by Maurice de Jong

No.	Title	Length
1.	"Eradication"	1:27
2.	"Thorns"	4:26
3.	"Passage"	5:26
4.	"Passage"	4:25
5.	"Shall Not Take Form"	5:33
6.	"Purity"	4:51
7.	"The Deification"	3:48

== Personnel ==
Adapted from The Deification liner notes.

- Maurice de Jong (as Mories) – vocals, instruments, recording, cover art

== Release history ==
Region	Date	Label	Format	Catalog
Canada	2012	Transcendental Creations	CD	TC015
