= Migdal Bavel =

Studio album by De Magia Veterum
- Released: January 20, 2009
- Recorded: 2008
- Studio: De Bejaarde, Drachten, NL
- Genre: Avant-garde metal, black metal, industrial
- Length: 33:39
- Label: Mistress Dance/Transcendental Creations

De Magia Veterum chronology
The Apocalyptic Seven Headed Beast Arisen (2007)	Migdal Bavel (2009)	In Conspectu Divinae Majestatis (2010)

Maurice de Jong chronology
The Genocidal Deliverance (2008)	Migdal Bavel (2009)	All the Dread Magnificence of Perversity (2009)

Migdal Bavel is the second studio album by De Magia Veterum, released on January 20, 2009, by Mistress Dance Records and Transcendental Creations. It was first issued on cassette, with the pressing limited to a hundred copies.

== Critical reception ==
Professional ratings
Review scores
Source	Rating
Allmusic	3/5 stars

Eduardo Rivadavia of allmusic gave the album three out of five stars, saying "this one-Dutchman operation spares no effort to advance black metal's misanthropic agenda, whether through sheer sonic terrorism (see sand-blasting onslaughts like "The Confusion of Tongues," "The Boat of Uta-Napishtim," and "Zaota"), or impressive avant-garde rule breaking (ergo the title track's free jazz percussion and synthesizer hiccups, the serpentine piano tap-dance of "I Am the Vine," and the bubbling synthesized orchestrations of "Rapture")."

== Track listing ==
All music is composed by Maurice de Jong

Side one
No.	Title	Length
1.	"The Confusion of Tongues"	2:52
2.	"Migdal Bavel"	5:03
3.	"The Boat of Uta-Naphistim"	6:06
4.	"Curse of Cannan"	3:51
5.	"Zaota"	3:30

Side two
No.	Title	Length
1.	"I Am the Vine"	3:59
2.	"Below the Altar of Ra-Hoor-Khuit"	4:03
3.	"Rapture"	4:15

CD track listing
No.	Title	Length
1.	"The Confusion of Tongues"	2:52
2.	"Migdal Bavel"	5:03
3.	"The Boat of Uta-Naphistim"	6:06
4.	"Interlude I: The Ruins of Copan"	1:56
5.	"Curse of Cannan"	3:51
6.	"Zaota"	3:30
7.	"I Am the Vine"	3:59
8.	"Interlude II: Evocation of the Gallu"	1:55
9.	"Below the Altar of Ra-Hoor-Khuit"	4:03
10.	"Rapture"	4:15

== Personnel ==
Adapted from Migdal Bavel liner notes.

- Maurice de Jong (as Mories) – vocals, instruments, recording, cover art

== Release history ==
Region	Date	Label	Format	Catalog
Portugal	2009	Mistress Dance	CS	MDR 036
Canada	2009	Transcendental Creations	CD	TC008
