= Abyss of Longing Throats =

Studio album by Gnaw Their Tongues
- Released: August 7, 2015
- Recorded: 2011–2015
- Studios: De Bejaarde 2, Drachten, NL
- Genres: Black metal, drone, noise
- Length: 43:00
- Label: Crucial Blast

Gnaw Their Tongues chronology
Collected Atrocities 2005–2008 (2015)	Abyss of Longing Throats (2015)	NV (2015)

Maurice de Jong chronology
Night of Consecration (2015)	Abyss of Longing Throats (2015)	NV (2015)

Abyss of Longing Throats is the eighth studio album by Gnaw Their Tongues, released on August 7, 2015 by Crucial Blast.

== Track listing ==
All music is composed by Maurice de Jong.

No.	Title	Length
1.	"Lick the Poison From the Cave Walls"	6:57
2.	"Through Flesh"	5:49
3.	"Abyss of Longing Throats"	7:39
4.	"From the Black Mouth of Spite"	6:32
5.	"The Holy Body"	6:49
6.	"And They Will Be Cast Out into Utter Darkness"	4:17
7.	"Up into the Heavens Down into the Circles of Hell"	4:57

== Personnel ==
Adapted from the Abyss of Longing Throats liner notes.

- Maurice de Jong (as Mories) – vocals, effects, recording, cover art

== Release history ==
Region	Date	Label	Format	Catalog
United States	2015	Crucial Blast	CD	CBR112
