= I Was So Sad =

Studio album by Seirom
- Released: July 8, 2016
- Recorded: 2012 – 2016
- Studio: De Bejaarde II, Drachten, NL
- Genre: Shoegaze, dark ambient
- Length: 47:24

Seirom chronology
Sunday Rain (2015)	I Was So Sad (2016)	Slow Waves (2018)

Maurice de Jong chronology
Wenn die leere Seele zur Hölle fährt (2016)	I Was So Sad (2016)	The Light of Christ / The Sword of Christ (2016)

I Was So Sad is the fourth full-length studio album by Seirom, independently released on July 8, 2016.

== Track listing ==
All music is composed by Maurice de Jong.

No.	Title	Length
1.	"Palm Trees"	4:44
2.	"It Feels Like Yesterday"	5:27
3.	"Some of These Days"	5:16
4.	"Like the Moon Her Kindness"	4:44
5.	"I Was So Sad"	4:16
6.	"The Slowest Day Ever"	5:09
7.	"Barbados"	4:51
8.	"When Skies Are Grey"	3:32
9.	"That First Moment You Realise Everything Dies"	7:07

== Personnel ==
Adapted from the I Was So Sad liner notes.

- Maurice de Jong (as Mories) – vocals, instruments, recording, mixing, mastering, cover art
- Franscesca Marongiu – vocals (4)

== Release history ==
Region	Date	Label	Format
Netherlands	2016	self-released	Digital
