= The Night Comes Illuminated With Death =

Studio album by Cloak of Altering
- Released: June 27, 2011
- Recorded: October 2010 – January 2011
- Studio: De Bejaarde, Drachten, NL
- Genre: Avant-garde metal, black metal
- Length: 36:44
- Label: Human Jigsaw

Cloak of Altering chronology
The Night Comes Illuminated With Death (2011)	Ancient Paths Through Timeless Voids (2012)

Maurice de Jong chronology
Eremitic (2011)	The Night Comes Illuminated With Death (2011)	Seiromistkrieg (2011)

The Night Comes Illuminated With Death is the debut full-length studio album of Cloak of Altering, released on June 27, 2011 by Human Jigsaw Records.

== Track listing ==
All music is composed by Maurice de Jong

No.	Title	Length
1.	"I Diabolus, Fallen and Vengeful"	6:02
2.	"Cloak of Altering"	6:06
3.	"The Night Comes Illuminated with Death"	6:48
4.	"The Lustful Farçade of the Madrigals"	4:44
5.	"Veil of Stars"	5:04
6.	"Golden Radiation Fills the Void"	8:00

== Personnel ==
Adapted from The Night Comes Illuminated With Death liner notes.

- Maurice de Jong (as Mories) – vocals, instruments, recording, cover art

== Release history ==
Region	Date	Label	Format	Catalog
United Kingdom	2011	Human Jigsaw	CD	HJRCD006
