= None (Cloak of Altering EP) =

EP by Cloak of Altering
- Released: November 18, 2013
- Recorded: 2012 – 2013
- Studio: De Bejaarde II, Drachten, NL
- Genre: Avant-garde metal, black metal
- Length: 22:26

Cloak of Altering chronology
Ancient Paths Through Timeless Voids (2012)	None (2013)	Plague Beasts (2014)

Maurice de Jong chronology
Sparkle Night (2013)	None (2013)	December Sleep (2013)

None is an EP by Cloak of Altering, independently released on November 18, 2013.

== Track listing ==
All music is composed by Maurice de Jong

No.	Title	Length
1.	"None"	2:15
2.	"None Flesh"	4:42
3.	"Particle Mist"	4:47
4.	"Unending Deities"	5:10
5.	"Plane of the Seven Earths"	5:32

== Personnel ==
Adapted from the None liner notes.

- Maurice de Jong (as Mories) – vocals, instruments, recording, cover art

== Release history ==
Region	Date	Label	Format
Netherlands	2013	self-released	Digital
