= All the Dread Magnificence of Perversity =

Studio album by Gnaw Their Tongues
- Released: May 10, 2009
- Recorded: 2008 – 2009
- Studio: De Bejaarde, Drachten, NL
- Genre: Dark ambient, industrial, noise
- Length: 82:12
- Label: Burning World/Crucial Blast

Gnaw Their Tongues chronology
The Genocidal Deliverance (2008)	All the Dread Magnificence of Perversity (2009)	Rend Each Other Like Wild Beasts (2009)

Maurice de Jong chronology
Migdal Bavel (2009)	All the Dread Magnificence of Perversity (2009)	Rend Each Other Like Wild Beasts (2009)

All the Dread Magnificence of Perversity is the fourth full-length studio album by Gnaw Their Tongues, released on May 10, 2009 by Burning World and Crucial Blast.

== Critical reception ==
Professional ratings
Review scores
Source	Rating
Allmusic	3.5/5 stars

Music journalist Ned Raggett wrote a mixed to positive review, describing the album as "dreadfully magnificent in its arrangements of sheer sonic overload, sculpted to be an opera-of-sorts in a black pit" and concluded that "it's a well-done, if off-putting, approach." Noel Gardner of The Quietus compared the music favorably to the bludgeoning sound of Khanate and Swans and said "the amount of ground Gnaw Their Tongues covers, while achieving a certain stubborn musical inertia, is truly impressive."

== Track listing ==
All music is composed by Maurice de Jong

Side one
No.	Title	Length
1.	"My Orifices Await Ravaging"	7:12
2.	"Verbrennt und Verflucht"	6:00
3.	"Broken Fingers Point Upwards in Vain"	7:26

Side two
No.	Title	Length
1.	"The Stench of Dead Horses on My Breath and the Vile of Existence in My Hands"	6:48
2.	"L'ange qui annonce la fin du temps"	6:14
3.	"Gazing at Me Through Tears of Urine"	5:04

Side three
No.	Title	Length
1.	"Rife with Deep Teeth Marks"	8:17
2.	"All the Dread Magnificence of Perversity"	7:52
3.	"The Gnostic Ritual Consumption of Semen As Embodiment of Wounds Teared in the Soul"	7:15

Side four
No.	Title	Length
1.	"Thee, I Invoke, Akephalou"	6:42
2.	"I Hear Only the Clanking of the Scythe"	6:25
3.	"A Promise of Revenge Whispered from Stitched Lips"	7:07

CD edition track listing
No.	Title	Length
1.	"My Orifices Await Ravaging"	7:12
2.	"Verbrennt und Verflucht"	6:00
3.	"Broken Fingers Point Upwards in Vain"	7:26
4.	"The Stench of Dead Horses on My Breath and the Vile of Existence in My Hands"	6:48
5.	"L'ange qui annonce la fin du temps"	6:14
6.	"Gazing at Me Through Tears of Urine"	5:04
7.	"Rife with Deep Teeth Marks"	8:17
8.	"All the Dread Magnificence of Perversity"	7:52
9.	"The Gnostic Ritual Consumption of Semen As Embodiment of Wounds Teared in the Soul"	7:15

== Personnel ==
Adapted from the All the Dread Magnificence of Perversity liner notes.

- Maurice de Jong (as Mories) – vocals, instruments, recording, mixing, mastering, cover art

== Release history ==
Region	Date	Label	Format	Catalog
Netherlands	2009	Burning World	LP	BWR007
United States	2009	Crucial Blast	CD	CBR78
