= Night of Consecration =

Studio album by Pyriphlegethon
- Released: March 1, 2015
- Recorded: July–August 2014
- Studio: Iduna and De Bejaarde II, Drachten, NL
- Genre: Black metal
- Length: 34:46

Maurice de Jong chronology
Collected Atrocities 2005–2008 (2015)	Night of Consecration (2015)	Abyss of Longing Throats (2015)

Night of Consecration is the debut studio album of Pyriphlegethon, released independently on March 1, 2015.

== Track listing ==
All music is composed by Pyriphlegethon

No.	Title	Length
1.	"Cursed in Moonlight"	1:04
2.	"Black Depths Beyond the Gate"	4:24
3.	"An Ancient Spell"	4:07
4.	"The Earth Blackened by Infernal Curse"	3:37
5.	"The Red Robe Order"	5:04
6.	"Silence of the Grave"	0:35
7.	"Rising of the Satanic Majesty"	3:11
8.	"The Burning Throne"	3:11
9.	"Kingdoms Fall to Ruin"	4:06
10.	"Night of Consecration"	5:27
Total length:		34:46

== Personnel ==
Adapted from the Night of Consecration liner notes.

- Maurice de Jong (as Mories) – vocals, guitar, synthesizer, drum programming, recording, cover art

== Release history ==
Region	Date	Label	Format
Netherlands	2015	self-released	CD, Digital
