= Dragged into Sunlight =

British extreme metal band

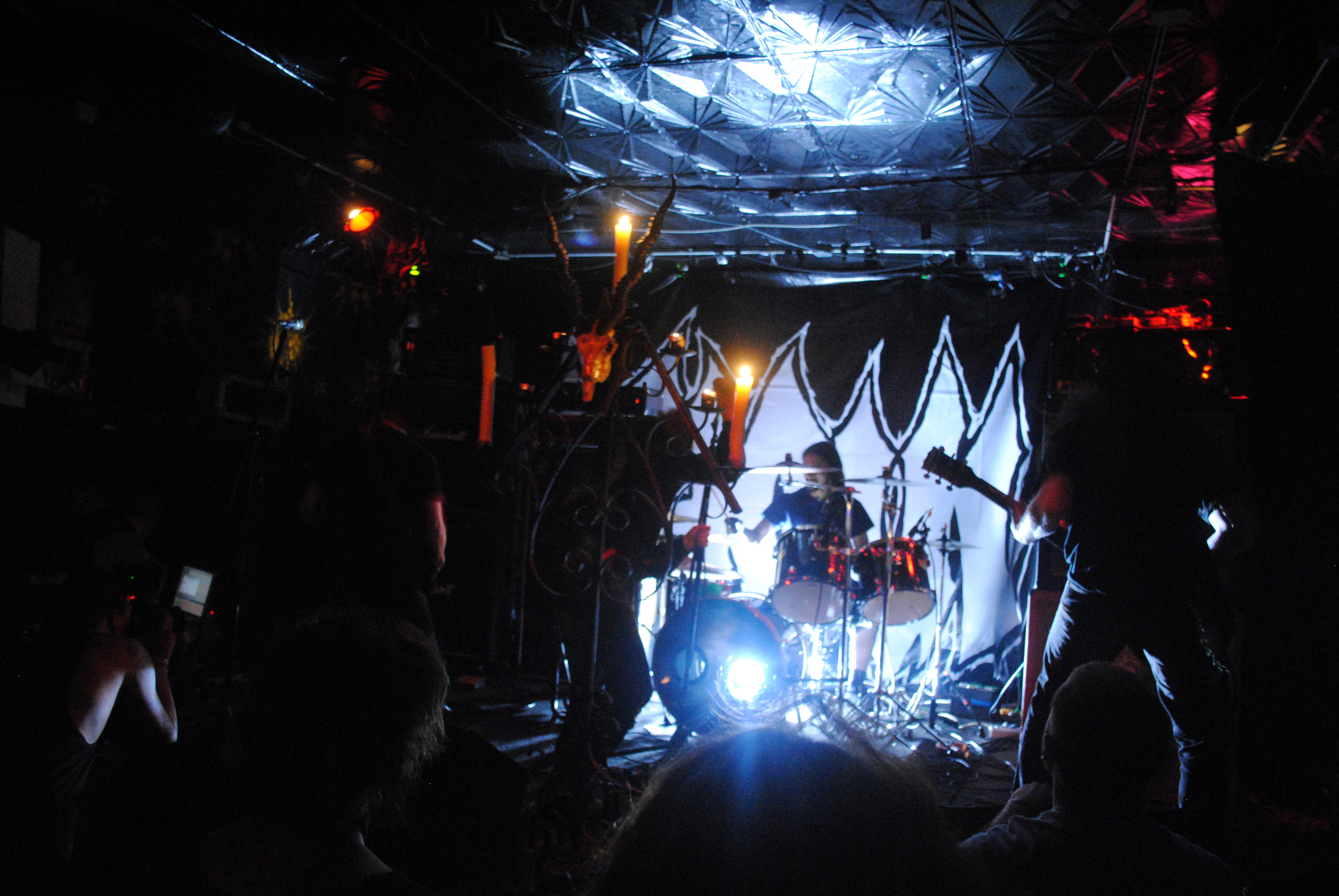
- Dragged into Sunlight in 2012

Background information
- Origin: Liverpool, England
- Genres: Death-doom, black metal, death metal
- Years active: 2006–present
- Label: Mordgrimm Records Prosthetic
- Members: T. (vocals); J. (drums); T. (guitars); C. (bass, samples)
- Website: draggedintosunlight.co.uk

Dragged into Sunlight is a British extreme metal band formed in 2006. Details on the identities of the band are purposefully vague, with all members wearing balaclavas in promotional photos, and performing with their backs toward the audience. The band's live shows are infamous for their intensity, with accompanying candles, a single stroboscopic light, and large amounts of smoke. Their sound combines influences from all major extreme metal genres. Their debut album, Hatred for Mankind, was produced by the acclaimed Billy Anderson. Following the release of the album the band played Damnation Festival and Maryland Deathfest. Their second album, Widowmaker, is a 40-minute song which received high praise from the music press.

== Discography ==
=== Studio albums ===
- Hatred for Mankind (2009, Mordgrimm)
- Widowmaker (2012, Prosthetic)

=== Extended plays ===
- Terminal Aggressor II (2020, Prosthetic)

=== Collaboration albums ===
- NV with Gnaw Their Tongues (2015, Prosthetic)

=== Live albums ===
- OCCII, Amsterdam (2011)

=== Demos ===
- Terminal Aggressor I (2008)

=== Singles ===
- Plainfield / Monarch of Scum (2021)
