= The Divine Antithesis =

Studio album by De Magia Veterum
- Released: February 7, 2011
- Recorded: January – March 2010
- Studio: De Bejaarde, Drachten, NL
- Genre: Avant-garde metal, black metal
- Length: 35:42
- Label: Transcendental Creations

De Magia Veterum chronology
| In Conspectu Divinae Majestatis (2010) | The Divine Antithesis (2011) | The Deification (2012) |

Maurice de Jong chronology
| L'arrivée de la terne mort triomphante (2010) | The Divine Antithesis (2011) | Eremitic (2011) |

The Divine Antithesis is the third studio album by De Magia Veterum, released on February 7, 2011, by Transcendental Creations.

== Critical reception ==
Professional ratings
Review scores
| Source | Rating |
|---|---|
| AllMusic | 3/5 stars |

Eduardo Rivadavia of AllMusic calls the album "highly sophisticated" and "a ceaseless blur of aural overkill."

== Track listing ==
All music is composed by Maurice de Jong.

| No. | Title | Length |
|---|---|---|
| 1. | "Part 1: Transfiguration" | 6:13 |
| 2. | "Part 2: The Stench of Burning Wings" | 4:56 |
| 3. | "Part 3: The Flaming Sword" | 4:45 |
| 4. | "Part 4: The Heavens" | 5:09 |
| 5. | "Part 5: Torn Between Ruins, Faith and the Divine" | 4:30 |
| 6. | "Part 6: Burning Hands and a Crown of Flames" | 5:16 |
| 7. | "Part 7: Angelical Deformity" | 4:53 |

== Personnel ==
Adapted from The Divine Antithesis liner notes.

- Maurice de Jong (as Mories) – vocals, instruments, recording, cover art

== Release history ==
| Region | Date | Label | Format | Catalog |
|---|---|---|---|---|
| Canada | 2011 | Transcendental Creations | CD | TC013 |
