= Hymns for the Broken, Swollen and Silent =

Hymns for the Broken, Swollen, and Silent

Studio album by Gnaw Their Tongues
- Released: December 9, 2016
- Recorded: 2013–2016
- Studio: Bejaarde II, Drachten, The Netherlands
- Genre: Black metal, dark ambient, noise
- Length: 39:43
- Label: Consouling Sounds, Tartarus Records, Crucial Blast

Gnaw Their Tongues chronology
Wenn die leere Seele zur Hölle fährt (2016)	Hymns for the Broken, Swollen, and Silent (2016)	Genocidal Majesty (2018)

Maurice de Jong chronology
The Light of Christ / The Sword of Christ (2016)	Hymns for the Broken, Swollen and Silent (2016)	Black Teeth (2017)

Hymns for the Broken, Swollen, and Silent is the tenth studio album by Gnaw Their Tongues. On December 9, 2016 it was released on vinyl by Consouling Sounds and on cassette by Tartarus Records. It was released on CD by Crucial Blast on December 16, 2016

== Track listing ==
All music is composed by Maurice de Jong.

Side A
No.	Title	Length
1.	"Hold High the Banners of Truth Among the Swollen Dead"	5:04
2.	"The Speared Promises"	4:10
3.	"Frail as the Stalking Lions"	4:32
4.	"Your Kingdom Shrouded in Blood"	5:57

Side B
No.	Title	Length
1.	"Silent Burned Atrocities"	4:28
2.	"Hymn for the Broken, Swollen and Silent"	5:19
3.	"I Have Clad the Pillar in the Flayed Skins"	4:21
4.	"Our Mouths Ridden with Worms"	5:52
