= Issei Sagawa (EP) =

EP by Gnaw Their Tongues
- Released: August 24, 2007
- Recorded: 2007
- Studio: De Bejaarde, Drachten, NL
- Genre: Dark ambient, industrial
- Length: 9:31

Gnaw Their Tongues chronology
Die Mutter wählt das Todtenkleidchen (2007)	Issei Sagawa (2007)	...Spasming and Howling (2007)

Maurice de Jong chronology
Die Mutter wählt das Todtenkleidchen (2007)	Issei Sagawa (2007)	...Spasming and Howling (2007)

Issei Sagawa is an EP by Gnaw Their Tongues, independently released on August 24, 2007. The album takes its name from Issei Sagawa, a Japanese man who murdered and cannibalized a Dutch woman named Renée Hartevelt in 1981. The music draws more from industrial music than previous work by Gnaw Their Tongues.

== Track listing ==
All music is composed by Maurice de Jong

No.	Title	Length
1.	"White Skin"	4:27
2.	"Sadosagawa"	5:04

== Personnel ==
Adapted from the Issei Sagawa liner notes.

- Maurice de Jong (as Mories) – vocals, instruments, recording, cover art

== Release history ==
Region	Date	Label	Format
Netherlands	2007	self-released	Digital
