= 1973 (album) =

Studio album by Seirom
- Released: November 9, 2012
- Recorded: 2012
- Studios: De Bejaarde, Drachten, NL
- Genre: Dark ambient
- Length: 91:39
- Label: Aurora Borealis

Seirom chronology
Forest (2011)	1973 (2012)	Goodbye Cold Nights (2013)

Maurice de Jong chronology
Ancient Paths Through Timeless Voids (2012)	1973 (2012)	Goodbye Cold Nights (2013)

1973 is the second full-length studio album by Seirom, released on November 9, 2012, by Aurora Borealis.

== Track listing ==
All music is composed by Maurice de Jong.

Disc one
No.	Title	Length
1.	"Strands of Golden Light"	7:49
2.	"Never So Lost"	6:10
3.	"As Hills"	6:58
4.	"1973"	4:36
5.	"Forever"	3:23
6.	"My Dear"	5:41
7.	"At Night"	6:03
8.	"November"	6:09

Disc two
No.	Title	Length
1.	"To Disappear"	3:29
2.	"Never Want to Feel That Way Again"	7:25
3.	"Deep Still Silent Earth"	7:49
4.	"Change"	4:27
5.	"Nur Dast bist du"	6:56
6.	"For Black Hearts"	8:39
7.	"Experience the Light"	6:05

== Personnel ==
Adapted from the 1973 liner notes.

- Maurice de Jong (as Mories) – instruments, effects, recording, cover art
- Aaron Martin – cello

== Release history ==
Region	Date	Label	Format	Catalog
United States	2012	Aurora Borealis	CD, LP	ABX058
