= In Conspectu Divinae Majestatis =

EP by De Magia Veterum
- Released: September 1, 2010
- Studio: De Bejaarde, Drachten, NL
- Genre: Black metal
- Length: 14:35

De Magia Veterum chronology
Migdal Bavel (2009)	In Conspectu Divinae Majestatis (2010)	The Divine Antithesis (2011)

Maurice de Jong chronology
The Blotched and the Unwanted (2010)	In Conspectu Divinae Majestatis (2010)	L'arrivée de la terne mort triomphante (2010)

In Conspectu Divinae Majestatis is an EP by De Magia Veterum, independently released on September 1, 2010. The tracks were originally recorded with the intention of being placed on a split release alongside another band's work.

== Track listing ==
All music is composed by Maurice de Jong

No.	Title	Length
1.	"Whirlwind of Fleeting Death"	3:29
2.	"The Golden Throne"	3:19
3.	"In Conspectu Divinae Majestatis"	3:50
4.	"Empire of Emptiness"	3:57

== Personnel ==
Adapted from In Conspectu Divinae Majestatis liner notes.

- Maurice de Jong (as Mories) – vocals, instruments, recording, cover art

== Release history ==
Region	Date	Label	Format
Netherlands	2010	self-released	Digital
