= Per Flagellum Sanguemque, Tenebras Veneramus =

Studio album by Gnaw Their Tongues
- Released: November 8, 2011
- Recorded: 2010 – 2011
- Studio: De Bejaarde, Drachten, NL
- Genre: Dark ambient, noise
- Length: 57:58
- Label: Crucial Blast

Gnaw Their Tongues chronology
L'arrivée de la terne mort triomphante (2010)	Per Flagellum Sanguemque, Tenebras Veneramus (2011)	Eschatological Scatology (2012)

Maurice de Jong chronology
Seiromistkrieg (2011)	Per Flagellum Sanguemque, Tenebras Veneramus (2011)	Forest (2011)

Per Flagellum Sanguemque, Tenebras Veneramus (Latin for With Blood and Whip, We Worship the Dark) is the sixth full-length studio album by Gnaw Their Tongues, released on November 8, 2011 by Crucial Blast. The album saw a return to the more direct and aggressive sound of Gnaw Their Tongues' earlier work, which contrasts the more polished and lighter toned L'arrivée de la terne mort triomphante released the previous year.

== Track listing ==
All music is composed by Maurice de Jong

No.	Title	Length
1.	"Hic est enim Calix Sánguinis mei" (This is the Chalice of my Blood)	6:46
2.	"Human Skin for the Messengers Robe"	7:20
3.	"Urine Soaked Neophytes"	6:45
4.	"Tod, Wo Ist Dein Licht" (Death, Where Is Your Light)	7:13
5.	"Fallen Deities Bathing in Gall"	7:02
6.	"Bonedust on Dead Genitals"	7:54
7.	"The Storming Heavens as a Father to All Broken Bodies"	5:25
8.	"Per Flagellum Sanguemque, Tenebras Veneramus" (With Blood and Whip, We Worship the Dark)	9:33

== Personnel ==
Adapted from the Per Flagellum Sanguemque, Tenebras Veneramus liner notes.

- Maurice de Jong (as Mories) – vocals, instruments, recording, mixing, mastering, cover art

== Release history ==
Region	Date	Label	Format	Catalog
United States	2011	Crucial Blast	CD	CBR93
Belgium	2012	ConSouling	LP	SOUL0018
