= Manifestation (Cloak of Altering album) =

Studio album by Cloak of Altering
- Released: December 4, 2015
- Recorded: Fall–Winter 2014
- Studio: De Bejaarde II, Drachten, NL
- Genre: Avant-garde metal, black metal
- Length: 47:03
- Label: Crucial Blast

Cloak of Altering chronology
Plague Beasts (2014)	Manifestation (2015)

Maurice de Jong chronology
NV (2015)	Manifestation (2015)	Sunday Rain (2015)

Manifestation is the fourth full-length studio album by Cloak of Altering, released on December 4, 2015 by Crucial Blast.

== Track listing ==
All music is composed by Maurice de Jong

No.	Title	Length
1.	"Manifestation"	1:49
2.	"-3.003486962(6)+—10–66"	6:55
3.	"Stretching Infinity"	7:28
4.	"Cave Systems of the Outer Moons"	7:57
5.	"Hidden Celestial Deity"	7:44
6.	"Black Hole Cloaks"	8:27
7.	"Parasitic Altering Sickness"	6:43

== Personnel ==
Adapted from the Manifestation liner notes.

- Maurice de Jong (as Mories) – vocals, effects, recording, cover art

== Release history ==
Region	Date	Label	Format	Catalog
United States	2015	Crucial Blast	CD	CBR 114
