= And the Light Swallowed Everything =

Studio album by Seirom
- Released: May 1, 2014
- Recorded: 2011 – 2013
- Studio: De Bejaarde II, Drachten, NL
- Genre: Shoegaze, dark ambient
- Length: 47:24
- Label: Burning World

Seirom chronology
December Sleep (2013)	And the Light Swallowed Everything (2014)	Strandheem '92 (2014)

Maurice de Jong chronology
Plague Beasts (2014)	And the Light Swallowed Everything (2014)	Strandheem '92 (2014)

And the Light Swallowed Everything is the third full-length studio album by Seirom, released on May 1, 2014, by Burning World Records.

== Reception ==
José Carlos Santos of Terrorizer lauded the album, describing the music as "hauntingly, harrowingly, luminously beautiful." He concluded by saying, "Do you know when death or near-death experiences are sometimes portrayed in the movies from the perspective of the dying, when there’s a huge flash of white light that fills the whole screen? This album is a sort of sonic equivalent to a still frame of that exact moment."

== Track listing ==
All music is composed by Maurice de Jong.

No.	Title	Length
1.	"I Could Not See You Through the Clouds"	4:34
2.	"And the Light Swallowed Everything"	5:45
3.	"I'm So Glad to Have Been a Part of You"	5:46
4.	"Starshine"	5:11
5.	"The Best You Can Be"	4:33
6.	"Leaving"	6:11
7.	"Exalted"	4:47
8.	"Last Snow on the Mountains"	5:04
9.	"What Could Have Been But Never Will Be"	5:33

== Personnel ==
Adapted from the And the Light Swallowed Everything liner notes.

- Maurice de Jong (as Mories) – vocals, instruments, recording, mixing, mastering, cover art
- Franscesca Marongiu – vocals (3)
- Aaron Martin – cello (6, 8)

== Release history ==
Region	Date	Label	Format	Catalog
Netherlands	2014	Burning World	CD, LP	BWR037
