= Plague Beasts =

Studio album by Cloak of Altering
- Released: April 29, 2014
- Recorded: De Bejaarde II, Drachten, NL
- Genre: Avant-garde metal, black metal
- Length: 37:11
- Label: Crucial Blast

Cloak of Altering chronology
NONE (2013)	Plague Beasts (2014)	Manifestation (2015)

Maurice de Jong chronology
Dyodyo Asema (2014)	Plague Beasts (2014)	And the Light Swallowed Everything (2014)

Plague Beasts is the third studio album by Cloak of Altering, released on April 29, 2014 by Crucial Blast.

== Track listing ==
All music is composed by Maurice de Jong

No.	Title	Length
1.	"Plague Beasts"	5:20
2.	"White Inverted Void"	5:27
3.	"Translucent Body Deformities"	5:43
4.	"Chaos Magician of the Abyss"	5:54
5.	"Ash666urA"	4:39
6.	"Into Celestial Hell"	4:48
7.	"Altering Forever"	5:20

== Personnel ==
Adapted from the Plague Beasts liner notes.

- Maurice de Jong (as Mories) – vocals, instruments, recording, cover art

== Release history ==
Region	Date	Label	Format	Catalog
United States	2014	Crucial Blast	CD	
