= Eschatological Scatology =

Studio album by Gnaw Their Tongues
- Released: June 6, 2012
- Recorded: 2008–2009
- Studios: De Bejaarde, Drachten, NL
- Genres: Symphonic black metal; dark ambient; noise
- Length: 51:37

Gnaw Their Tongues chronology
Per Flagellum Sanguemque, Tenebras Veneramus (2012)	Eschatological Scatology (2012)	Sulfur (2013)

Maurice de Jong chronology
Forest (2011)	Eschatological Scatology (2012)	The Deification (2012)

Eschatological Scatology is the seventh full-length studio album by Gnaw Their Tongues, independently released on June 6, 2012.

== Track listing ==
All music is composed by Maurice de Jong.

No.	Title	Length
1.	"Eschatological Scatology"	4:07
2.	"The Messianic Downfall"	4:52
3.	"Deepwood Bodytrap"	6:36
4.	"Lash Cultus"	4:11
5.	"Master I Am Done"	6:50
6.	"A Sinister Lurking Grave"	5:21
7.	"The Golden Altar Burns"	9:21
8.	"The Atrocious Angel of Scatology"	10:19

== Personnel ==
Adapted from the Eschatological Scatology liner notes.

- Maurice de Jong (as Mories) – vocals, instruments, recording, mixing, mastering, cover art

== Release history ==
Region	Date	Label	Format	Catalog
Netherlands	2012	self-released	Digital	
Russia	2015	Infinite Fog	CD	IF-54
