= Spit at Me and Wreak Havoc on My Flesh =

Studio album by Gnaw Their Tongues
- Released: January 2006
- Recorded: 2004–2006
- Studio: De Bejaarde, Drachten, NL
- Genre: Black metal; dark ambient; drone; noise
- Length: 50:02
- Label: Ominous Silence (re-issue)

Gnaw Their Tongues chronology
Spit at Me and Wreak Havoc on My Flesh (2006)	Horse Drawn Hearse (2006)

Maurice de Jong chronology
Clavicula Salomonis (2005)	Spit at Me and Wreak Havoc on My Flesh (2006)	Horse Drawn Hearse (2006)

Spit at Me and Wreak Havoc on My Flesh is the debut full-length studio album of Gnaw Their Tongues, independently released in January 2006.

== Track listing ==
All music is composed by Maurice de Jong

No.	Title	Length
1.	"A Burned Offering"	8:20
2.	"Spit at Me and Wreak Havoc on My Flesh"	5:52
3.	"Stabmovement and Skinning Essay"	7:08
4.	"…Gnaw Their Tongues in Pain"	5:22
5.	"Healing Open Wounds with Salt"	3:00
6.	"Seven Heads and Ten Horns"	8:40
7.	"Death, Suffering and Death"	11:40

== Personnel ==
Adapted from the Spit at Me and Wreak Havoc on My Flesh liner notes.

- Maurice de Jong (as Mories) – vocals, effects, recording, cover art

== Release history ==
Region	Date	Label	Format	Catalog
Netherlands	2006	self-released	CD	
United Kingdom	2011	Ominous Silence	CD	OS003
