= An Epiphanic Vomiting of Blood =

Studio album by Gnaw Their Tongues
- Released: December 15, 2007
- Recorded: 2006 – 2007
- Studio: De Bejaarde, Drachten, NL
- Genre: Drone metal, dark ambient, industrial black metal, art metal
- Length: 38:01
- Label: Burning World; Crucial Blast (re-issue)

Gnaw Their Tongues chronology
Bubonic Burial Rites (2007)	An Epiphanic Vomiting of Blood (2007)	Devotion (2008)

Maurice de Jong chronology
Bubonic Burial Rites (2007)	An Epiphanic Vomiting of Blood (2007)	Devotion (2008)

An Epiphanic Vomiting of Blood is the third full-length studio album by Gnaw Their Tongues, released on December 15, 2007 by Burning World and Señor Hernandez Records. It was re-issued in 2008 by Crucial Blast and became Gnaw Their Tongues' first album to be released on compact disc in the United States. This allowed for wider distribution and marked the first time the project garnered critical interest, with comparisons being favorably drawn to the music of Napalm Death and Carcass.

== Recording and release ==
The music for An Epiphanic Vomiting of Blood was recorded at composer Maurice de Jong's personal studio in Drachten, named De Bejaarde. De Jong was approached by Burning World Records, who offered to press his music to vinyl for a limited run of five hundred copies. The US-based label Crucial Blast adopted the album in early 2008, offering the music a wider distribution.

== Critical reception ==
Professional ratings
Review scores
Source	Rating
Allmusic	3.5/5 stars
Exclaim!	Favorable

An Epiphanic Vomiting of Blood garnered favorable reviews from music critics, primarily for its ability to conjure a bleak and oppressive atmosphere. Music journalist Ned Raggett gave the album three and a half out of five stars saying, "often, things seem to be fully careening out of control – no bad thing, but it makes songs hard to hum – but then there'll be some sort of Wagnerian surge, as on "Sawn Asunder and Left for the Beasts" or "And There Will Be More of Your Children Dead Tomorrow" that turns it all into a massive tension release." Albert Pollard of Aural Innovations lauded Gnaw Their Tongues' sound, saying "their music is bore of the Devil, it is dark and droning orchestral doom, horrific and bloody, it rolls like a horror film and sounds like one." Max Deneau of Exclaim! noted the number of diverse instruments employed in the compositions and compared the music to that of the Italian progressive rock band Goblin.

== Track listing ==
All music is composed by Maurice de Jong

Side one
No.	Title	Length
1.	"My Body Is Not a Vessel, Nor a Temple. It's a Repulsive Pile of Sickness"	7:30
2.	"Teeth That Leer Like Open Graves"	6:54
3.	"Sawn Asunder and Left for the Beasts"	5:40

Side two
No.	Title	Length
1.	"An Epiphanic Vomiting of Blood"	6:19
2.	"The Sewer Rats of Calcutta"	4:10
3.	"And There Will Be More of Your Children Dead Tomorrow"	7:28

CD edition bonus track
No.	Title	Length
7.	"The Urge to Participate in Butchery"	8:29

== Personnel ==
Adapted from the An Epiphanic Vomiting of Blood liner notes.

- Maurice de Jong (as Mories) – vocals, instruments, recording, cover art

== Release history ==
Region	Date	Label	Format	Catalog
Netherlands	2007	Burning World/Señor Hernandez	LP	BWR001
United States	2008	Crucial Blast	CD	CBR 69
