= L'arrivée de la terne mort triomphante =

Studio album by Gnaw Their Tongues
- Released: September 7, 2010
- Recorded: January – April 2010
- Studio: De Bejaarde, Drachten, NL
- Genre: Dark ambient, industrial, noise
- Length: 44:49
- Label: Burning World/Crucial Blast/Candlelight

Gnaw Their Tongues chronology
The Blotched and the Unwanted (2010)	L'arrivée de la terne mort triomphante (2010)	Per Flagellum Sanguemque, Tenebras Veneramus (2011)

Maurice de Jong chronology
In Conspectu Divinae Majestatis (2010)	L'arrivée de la terne mort triomphante (2010)	The Divine Antithesis (2011)

L'arrivée de la terne mort triomphante (French for The arrival of the triumphant dull death) is the fifth full-length studio album by Gnaw Their Tongues, released on September 7, 2010 by Burning World, Crucial Blast and Candlelight Records. The album showcased a change in musical direction, with more emphasis on orchestration and lighter moods. The album also marked the last time Maurice de Jong recorded a Gnaw Their Tongues album using his old studio and computer setup. It received high marks from music critics, with PopMatters ranking it as one of the greatest heavy metal albums of the year.

== Background ==
In 2010, composer Maurice de Jong signed a record deal for a full-length with Candlelight Records for one year, with the option for extension. Originally conceived as an EP, the album was expanded to meet Candlelight's contractual requirements.

== Music ==
The compositions of L'arrivée de la terne mort triomphante saw de Jong adopting more dark ambient and orchestral influences into his music. Some critics noted that the music was more restrained and even solemn in contrast to Gnaw Their Tongues' previous work. When asked about his approach to composing, De Jong said "The choirs were built from samples. They're chords, which I used to make my own melodies. The piano was played by myself. The cellos were recordings I did myself, but a friend played these parts. I used these parts as well to make new melodies. Basically it's always a mixture of real recordings and samples." He also elaborated that the music was representing "an abstract visual idea of death: white, silent and solemn." Being composed around a concept, the music was the more planned out than any album previous.

== Critical reception ==
Professional ratings
Review scores
Source	Rating
Allmusic	4/5 stars

Upon its release L'arrivée de la terne mort triomphante was well received by critics, who praised the change of sound and broadening of musical scope. Music journalist Ned Raggett gave the album four out of five stars, favorably comparing the music to that of Swans, Neurosis, and Savage Republic and crediting Gnaw Their Tongues with "singlehandedly reviving orchestral/industrial composition styles from the end of the 1980s." Adrien Begrand of PopMatters listed the album as being the eighteenth greatest heavy metal release of the year, saying "this album artfully meshes black metal, industrial, dark ambient, and even a touch of neoclassical, and comes up with something as beautiful as it is harrowing." It also placed on NME's end of the year for "Best Cult/Experimental Albums", with John Doran saying, "[L'arrivée de la terne mort triomphante] sounds like a full orchestra and black metal group being fed slowly into a meat grinder."

== Track listing ==
All music is composed by Maurice de Jong

No.	Title	Length
1.	"L'arrivée de la terne mort triomphante"	9:49
2.	"Les anges frémissent devant la mort"	11:35
3.	"La mort dans toute son ineffable grandeur/Splendeur"	8:12
4.	"Le chant de la mort"	7:02
5.	"Le trône blanc de la mort"	8:11

== Personnel ==
Adapted from the L'arrivée de la terne mort triomphante liner notes.

- Maurice de Jong (as Mories) – vocals, instruments, recording, mixing, mastering, cover art

== Release history ==
Region	Date	Label	Format	Catalog
Netherlands	2010	Burning World	LP	BWR007
United States	2010	Crucial Blast	CD	CBR78
United Kingdom	2010	Candlelight	CD	CANDLE321CD
