= Reeking Pained and Shuddering =

Studio album by Gnaw Their Tongues
- Released: September 8, 2007
- Recorded: 2006–2007
- Studio: De Bejaarde, Drachten, NL
- Genre: Dark ambient; noise; black metal
- Length: 43:30
- Label: Paradigms

Gnaw Their Tongues chronology
| …Spasming and Howling (2007) | Reeking Pained and Shuddering (2007) | Dawn Breaks Open Like a Wound That Bleeds Afresh (2007) |

Maurice de Jong chronology
| …Spasming and Howling (2007) | Spit at Me and Wreak Havoc on My Flesh (2007) | Dawn Breaks Open Like a Wound That Bleeds Afresh (2007) |

Reeking Pained and Shuddering is the second full-length studio album by Gnaw Their Tongues, released on September 8, 2007, by Paradigms Recordings.

== Track listing ==
All music is composed by Maurice de Jong

| No. | Title | Length |
|---|---|---|
| 1. | "Blood Spills Out of Everything I Touch" | 8:36 |
| 2. | "Utter Futility of Creation" | 5:38 |
| 3. | "Nihilism; Tied Up and Burning" | 6:32 |
| 4. | "The Evening Wolves" | 4:52 |
| 5. | "Destroying Is Creating" | 7:28 |
| 6. | "Transition" | 10:24 |

== Personnel ==
Adapted from the Reeking Pained and Shuddering liner notes.

- Maurice de Jong (as Mories) – vocals, instruments, recording, cover art

== Release history ==
| Region | Date | Label | Format | Catalog |
|---|---|---|---|---|
| United Kingdom | 2007 | Paradigms | CD | PARADIGMS016 |
