= Collected Atrocities 2005–2008 =

Compilation album by Gnaw Their Tongues
- Released: February 3, 2015
- Recorded: 2005–2008
- Studio: De Bejaarde, Drachten, NL
- Genre: Dark ambient, black metal
- Length: 2:16:27
- Label: Crucial Blast

Gnaw Their Tongues chronology
Wir essen Seelen in der Nacht (2014)	Collected Atrocities 2005–2008 (2015)	Abyss of Longing Throats (2015)

Maurice de Jong chronology
Mesmerized (2015)	Collected Atrocities 2005–2008 (2015)	Night of Consecration (2015)

Collected Atrocities 2005–2008 is a compilation album by Gnaw Their Tongues, released on February 3, 2015, by Crucial Blast. The album comprises three EPs that had previously been issued on CD with several compilation and unreleased tracks.

== Track listing ==
All music is composed by Maurice de Jong

Disc one
No.	Title	Length
1.	"For All Slaves... a Song of False Hope I"	8:58
2.	"The Uncomfortable Silence in Between Beatings"	9:36
3.	"A Fiery Deluge"	8:04
4.	"My Womb Is Barren and I Want Revenge"	9:06
5.	"Aderlating"	9:04
6.	"For All Slaves... a Song of False Hope II"	7:35
7.	"Body Bouquet"	7:44
8.	"Slaves"	7:28

Disc two
No.	Title	Length
1.	"The Behemoth Crawls Ashore"	10:52
2.	"Horse Drawn Hearse"	9:50
3.	"Another Study in Bleakness and Despair"	7:12
4.	"Prefering Human Skin Over Animal Fur"	12:20
5.	"Spasming and Howling"	7:50
6.	"Glorification of Rats"	5:34
7.	"Circles of the Abyss"	15:26

== Personnel ==
Adapted from Collected Atrocities 2005–2008 liner notes.

- Maurice de Jong (as Mories) – vocals, instruments, recording, cover art

== Release history ==
Region	Date	Label	Format	Catalog
United States	2015	Crucial Blast	CD	CBR110
