= De Magia Veterum =

- Origin: Drachten, Friesland, Netherlands
- Genres: Avant-garde metal, black metal
- Years active: 2003–present
- Label: Transcendental Creations
- Members: Maurice de Jong
- Website: www.demagiaveterum.com

De Magia Veterum is an avant-garde metal musical project founded by Dutch multi-instrumentalist and composer Maurice "Mories" de Jong in 2003. In contrast to de Jong's other work, the music of De Magia Veterum is decidedly electric guitar-based and heavily indebted to black metal music. Allmusic credited the discography with "redefining the limits of extremism through pure sonic annihilation."

== History ==
Maurice de Jong began recording for De Magia Veterum in 2003 and began releasing finished music under the name on Myspace in 2005. Shortly after, tracks were compiled together and released as De Magia Veterum's debut album, titled Spikes Through Eyes. The album would be expanded re-released in 2008 as Verus Diuinus Magus, including additional tracks recorded during the same sessions.

In 2009, De Magia Veterum issued its label debut on Transcendental Creations titled Migdal Bavel. Under the same label, The Divine Antithesis was released in 2011 and The Deification the following year.

== Discography ==
Studio albums

- Spikes Through Eyes (2005)
- Migdal Bavel (2009)
- The Divine Antithesis (2011)
- The Deification (2012)
- Naked Swords into the Wombs of the Enemy (2017)

EPs

- Clavicula Salomonis (2005)
- The Blood of Prophet and Saints (2006)
- The Apocalyptic Seven Headed Beast Arisen (2007)
- In Conspectu Divinae Majestatis (2010)
