= Seirom =

- Origin: Drachten, Friesland, Netherlands
- Genres: Dark ambient, shoegazing
- Years active: 2011–present
- Labels: Aurora Borealis, Burning World
- Members: Maurice de Jong
- Website: www.devotionalhymns.com

Seirom is a dark ambient musical project started by Dutch multi-instrumentalist and composer Maurice de Jong, otherwise known as Mories. It was founded in 2011 and marked a stark contrast to de Jong's previous work, embracing a more ethereal sound.

== History ==
The Seirom project was conceived in 2011 after composer Maurice de Jong had reached a creative exhaustive point with his other active projects. "I started to feel burned out. I think all the negativity (in my music making) kind of had an impact on me. I needed to do something positive." He independently released Eremitic on June 6, 2011. 1973 was released on November 9, 2012 and featured a lighter more positive tone compared to Seirom's debut. On May 1, 2014 the third full-length album And the Light Swallowed Everything was released and received positively, with Kez Whelan of Terrorizer describing the music as "hauntingly, harrowingly, luminously beautiful." Seirom's fourth album I Was So Sad was released on July 8, 2016.

== Discography ==
- Eremitic (2011)
- 1973 (2012)
- And the Light Swallowed Everything (2014)
- I Was So Sad (2016)
