= Gnaw Their Tongues =

Dutch experimental music project

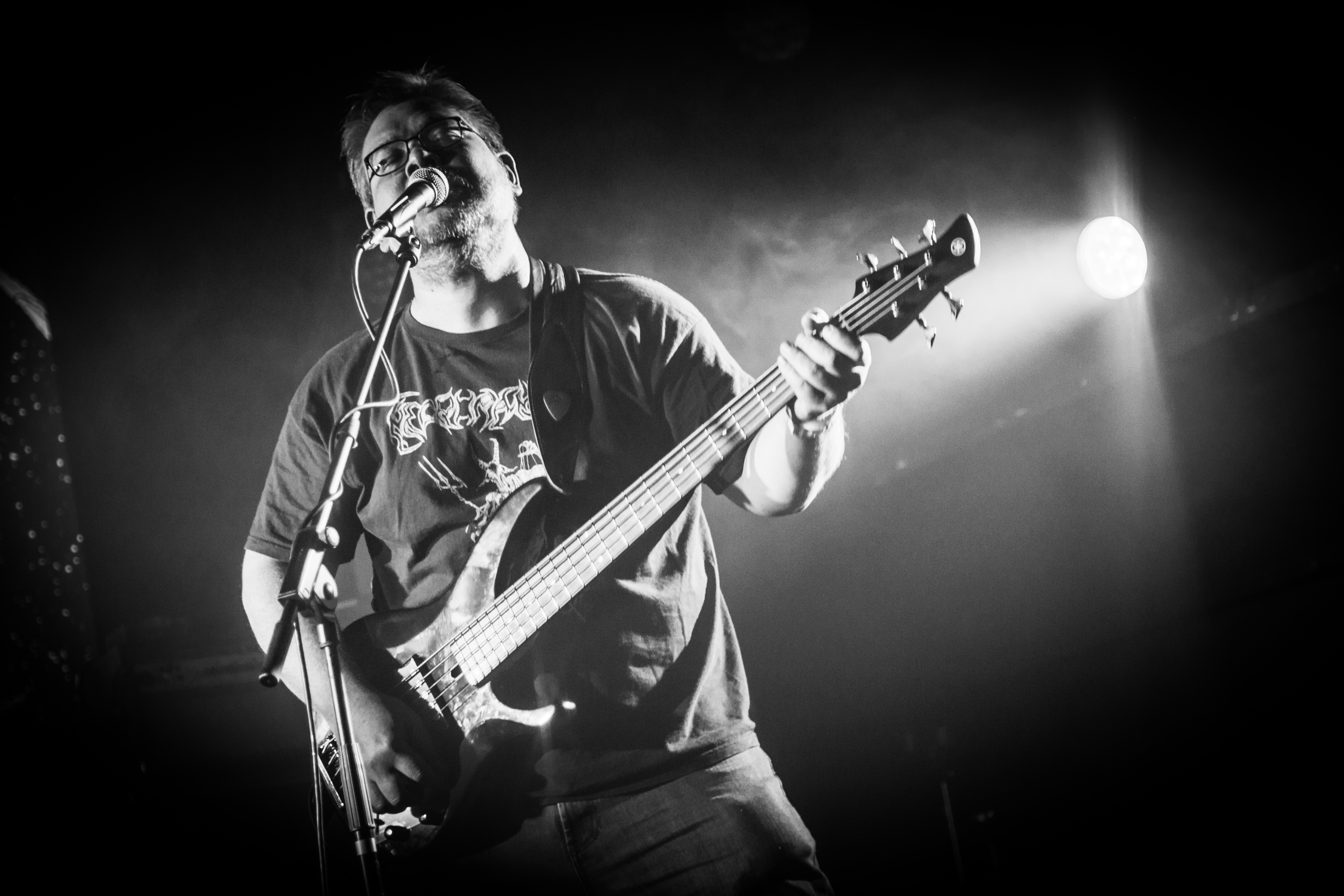
- Gnaw Their Tongues at Roadburn Festival 2017

Background information
- Origin: Drachten, Netherlands
- Genres: Noise; dark ambient; black metal; art metal; drone; industrial
- Years active: 2004–present
- Labels: Burning World; Crucial Blast
- Members: Maurice de Jong
- Website: www.devotionalhymns.com/gnawtheirtongues/

Gnaw Their Tongues is an experimental musical project started by Dutch multi-instrumentalist and composer Maurice de Jong, otherwise known as Mories. It was founded in 2004 and produced a debut album in 2006 titled Spit at Me and Wreak Havoc on My Flesh. The output of Gnaw Their Tongues is extensive, with over seventy releases being attributed to its name. The name of the project is taken from passage 16:10-11 from the Book of Revelation: "The fifth angel, who poured out his vial upon the seat of the beast; and his kingdom was full of darkness; and they gnawed their tongues for pain, And blasphemed the God of heaven because of their pains and their sores, and repented not of their deeds."

== History ==
Maurice "Mories" de Jong established Gnaw Their Tongues, originally conceived as Dimlit Hate Cellar, as a new outlet for his music in 2004. Previously, de Jong had been active musically since 1988 and composing music under several aliases since the early nineties. Gnaw Their Tongues' full-length debut, titled Spit at Me and Wreak Havoc on My Flesh, was independently released in January 2006. The album comprised seven lengthy drone pieces which drew inspiration from black metal and utilized sampling. Immediately de Jong began issuing multiple albums within months of each other, establishing himself as a prolific composer and musician. In 2007 An Epiphanic Vomiting of Blood was issued by Burning World Records and was critically well received.

L'arrivée de la terne mort triomphante was released in 2010 and saw de Jong adopting more dark ambient and orchestral influences into his music. De Jong described the music as representing "an abstract visual idea of death: white, silent and solemn." Being composed around a concept, the music was the more planned out than any album previous. 2010's Per Flagellum Sanguemque, Tenebras Veneramus returned to a more aggressive sound while concurrently moving away from distortion and retaining the dense orchestration of the previous album. De Jong admitted to being the most pleased with the album than any previous work, noting that the higher production values contributed to the album's success. In January 2015 Collected Atrocities 2005–2008 was released, comprising digitally unavailable albums and previously unreleased compilation tracks.

The project announced its ninth full-length album Hymns for the Broken, Swollen and Silent on vinyl, cassette and CD which was released on 9 December 2016 by Consouling Sounds, Tartarus Records and Crucial Blast respectively.

== Discography ==
- Spit at Me and Wreak Havoc on My Flesh (2006)
- Reeking Pained and Shuddering (Paradigms, 2007)
- An Epiphanic Vomiting of Blood (Burning World, 2007)
- All the Dread Magnificence of Perversity (Crucial Blast, 2009)
- L'arrivée de la terne mort triomphante (Candlelight, 2010)
- Per Flagellum Sanguemque, Tenebras Veneramus (Crucial Blast, 2011)
- Eschatological Scatology (2012)
- Abyss of Longing Throats (Crucial Blast, 2015)
- Hymns for the Broken, Swollen and Silent (2016)
- Genocidal Majesty (2018)
- Kapmeswonden en haatliederen (2018)
- An Eternity of Suffering, an Eternity of Pain (2019)
- I Speak the Truth, Yet with Every Word Uttered, Thousands Die (2020)
- The Cessation of Suffering (2023)
- The Genesis of Light (2025)
