= Maurice de Jong =

Dutch composer and musician

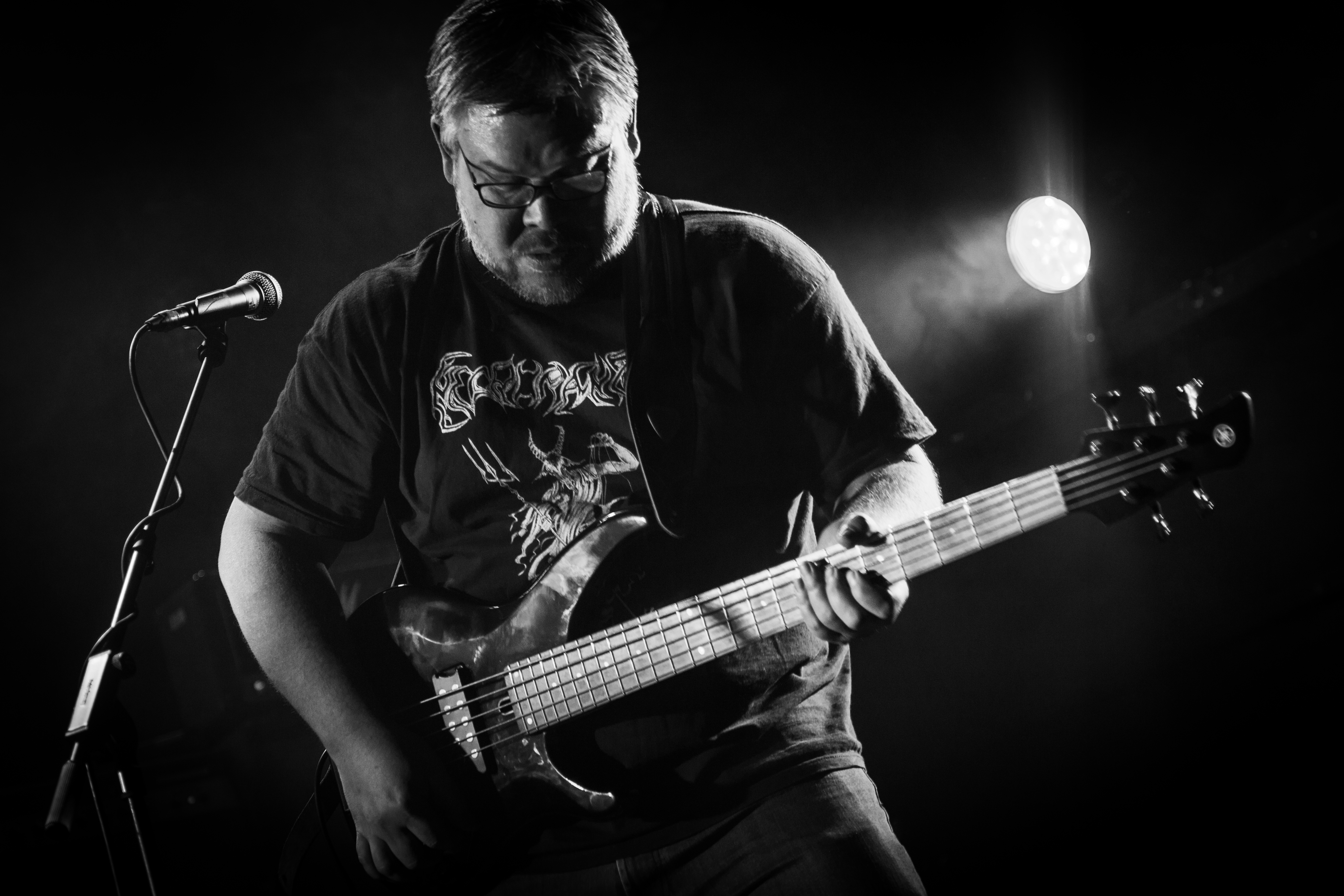
- Maurice de Jong at Roadburn Festival 2017

Background information
- Born: 5 September 1973 (age 52); Paramaribo, Suriname
- Origin: Smallingerland, Netherlands
- Genres: Dark ambient; black metal; drone; noise; martial industrial
- Occupations: Musician; composer; lyricist
- Instruments: Vocals; bass guitar; sampler; keyboards
- Years active: 1988–present
- Website: Bandcamp

Maurice de Jong (born 5 September 1973), known by his moniker Mories, is a Dutch composer and musician. He is best recognized for his multiple music projects, namely Gnaw Their Tongues, Seirom, Aderlating, Cloak of Altering and De Magia Veterum. His compositions are informed by ambient music, black metal, drone music, electronic music and the avant-garde. His interests lie in invoking a disquieting and nightmarish atmosphere with his music, which often utilizes distortion and dissonance. Lauded as a most prolific composer, de Jong has recorded an upwards of three albums per year since 2007.

== Biography ==
=== Early work (1988–2002) ===
Maurice de Jong began performing with bands in 1988, most of whom were influenced by black metal, death metal and doom metal. In the early nineties he performed with Cauteror and Soulwound, who performed lengthy songs that emphasized a depressing atmosphere, traits that de Jong would later adopt in his solo work. He started his own solo project in 1993, named Astral. Inspired by the Greek black metal outfit Necromantia, the music omitted the use of the electric guitar, with the electric bass guitar playing an integral role in the compositions. Several demo tapes were recorded between 1993 and 1994.

In 1996, de Jong founded a solo project called Ophiuchus, which recorded I Am Thou Art They Will and Nihilistic Cosmic Concept in 1998. The project would be revitalized as Cloak of Altering in 2010. In 1997, he began working with The Nefarious Cult, who recorded a single demo titled Initiation of the Nefarious Throne.

=== De Magia Veterum (2003–present) ===
Maurice de Jong formed De Magia Veterum in 2003 and served as an outlet for his more black metal–leaning compositions. In contrast to his other music, the music of De Magia Veterum is primarily guitar-based while continuing to explore avant-garde music with an emphasis on dissonance. Five albums have been released under the name: Spikes Through Eyes (2005), The Apocalyptic Seven Headed Beast Arisen (2007), Migdal Bavel (2009), The Divine Antithesis (2011) and The Deification (2012). Three EPs were released as well.

=== Gnaw Their Tongues (2004–present) ===
In 2004 Maurice de Jong conceived a new musical project under which he intended to compose and record named Dimlit Hate Cellar. By 2006, he changed the name to Gnaw Their Tongues, inspired by a passage from the Book of Revelation. Gnaw Their Tongues became the most prolific and critically recognized of Maurice de Jong's projects, with An Epiphanic Vomiting of Blood and L'arrivée de la terne mort triomphante recognized as highlights of his discography. Originally a studio-based project, Gnaw Their Tongues began performing in live performance settings in Spring 2015.

=== Aderlating (2008–present) ===
In 2008, Maurice de Jong formed Aderlating with keyboardist Eric Eijspaart (Mowlawner, Slavernij, Kraaiengebroed). The duo was formed after de Jong received multiple requests from people interested in booking Gnaw Their Tongues for live shows. Aderlating plays drone- and noise-based music, restricting itself to electronics and drum beats in the live setting. They have primarily performed around Europe.

=== Cloak of Altering (2010–present) ===
Cloak of Altering serves to continue of the Ophiuchus project of the late nineties. The music utilizes synthesizers as one of the prominent instruments and electronic music plays a larger role in the compositions. Four albums have been released under the name: The Night Comes Illuminated with Death (2011), Ancient Paths Through Timeless Voids (2012), Plague Beasts (2014) and Manifestation (2015)

=== Seirom (2011–present) ===
Citing exhaustion caused by the bleak nature of his previous work, de Jong founded Seirom with the intent of releasing music emphasizing love and beauty. He cited his personal need to explore the more positive side of life as driving force for writing the music.
