= Center of Alcohol Studies =

Multidisciplinary research institute on alcohol at Rutgers University

The Center of Alcohol Studies (CAS) is a multidisciplinary research institute located in the Busch Campus of Rutgers University, which performs clinical and biomedical research on alcohol use and misuse. The center was originally at Yale University and known as the Yale Center of Alcohol Studies, before it moved to Rutgers in 1962. The CAS is also home to the peer-reviewed Journal of Studies on Alcohol and Drugs (JSAD), the oldest journal on alcohol studies; and a library of alcohol literature. Early research in the 1940s at the CAS helped support the disease model of addiction that helped change public perception on alcohol consumption.

== History ==
The CAS was the first research institute dedicated to alcohol studies after the 21st amendment to the U.S. Constitution repealed prohibition in 1933. The center was founded at Yale as a research area in the Applied Physiology department in 1935. E. Morton Jellinek was Director of the Center until the 1950s, and stepped down when he was offered a position at the World Health Organization. He was replaced by Selden D. Bacon. The Yale Center of Alcohol Studies opened the first Summer School of Alcohol Studies in 1943, and in 1944 opened a free clinic devoted to treating alcoholism. The Summer School still continues every year. The CAS at Yale funded the early years of the National Council on Alcoholism (NCA; now known as the National Council on Alcoholism and Drug Dependence, NCAAD).

In the 1960s, there was a new President at Yale. Around this time, the Yale Corporation voted to move the Center to a new location, negotiating mainly with Brown, Columbia and Rutgers University. The center moved to Rutgers University in 1962, with financial assistance from the National Institutes of Health and philanthropist Christopher D. Smithers. Biochemist David Lester was appointed scientific director of the CAS after it moved to Rutgers. In 1964, the Center moved again to Smithers Hall, where the CAS is located today.

Interest in Alcohol studies increased in the United States in the 1970s. In December 1970, the National Institute on Alcohol Abuse and Alcoholism (NIAA) was created as part of the National Institutes of Health. The NIAA began to fund research at the CAS in the 1970s.

== Journal ==
While the CAS was still considered part of the Laboratory of Applied Physiology (LAP) located at Yale, Howard W. Haggard in 1940 founded the Quarterly Journal of Studies on Alcohol, the oldest journal on alcohol/addiction studies. The journal published both original research and abstracts from other sources. In 1941, Jellinek was managing editor of the journal. For several years Mark Keller was editor of the Quarterly from 1959 to 1977 and was named editor emeritus after his retirement. The Mark Keller Award was created in his honor for the best article in the journal. Timothy Coffey succeeded Keller.

The journal was later renamed the Journal of Studies on Alcohol and became a monthly publication in 1975. Again the journal was renamed to the Journal of Studies on Alcohol and Drugs. It is currently a bimonthly publication.

== Library ==
=== Classified Abstract Archive of the Alcohol Literature ===
The Classified Abstract Archive of the Alcohol Literature (CAAAL) is a special collection of abstracts by CAS staff from 1938 through 1977 of the scientific and scholarly alcohol literature. Jellinek was the original executive director. Publication ceased in 1978.

=== Donations ===
The Center has received several donations, including the Connor Alcohol Research Reference Files (CARRF). National Association of Lesbian and Gay Alcoholism Professionals (NALGAP), donated a library of research related to alcoholism and homosexuality.

== Research ==
The CAS operates these laboratories:

=== Biomedical ===
- Neuropharmacogenetics
- Neuropharmacology

=== Prevention and cause ===
- Cardiac Neuroscience Laboratory
- Health and Human Development Project
- Integrative Analysis Research Lab for College Alcohol Intervention Research
- Pittsburgh Youth Study
- R-SHARE
- RASRR
- Sensation and Emotion Lab

== See also ==
- Alcohol and health
- Helene Raskin White
- Center for Drug and Alcohol Programs
