= Guided self-change =

Psychotherapy technique

Guided self-change (GSC) treatment has been accepted by American Psychological Association Division 12, Society of Clinical Psychology, as an empirically supported treatment.

== Brief description ==
The Guided Self-Change (GSC) model is a brief, cognitive-behavioral, motivational intervention developed in the early 1980s. It is a form of brief cognitive behavioral therapy. It was first developed for problem drinkers, but has since then, been researched on several populations (e.g., drug abusers, Spanish-speaking alcohol abuses, adolescents, problem gamblers). The GSC approach has been shown to improve recovery outcomes in several clinical trials and was recognized by the Surgeon General's report on Facing Addiction in America (November 2016) as an appropriate treatment for individuals who have mild alcohol or drug problems.

== History ==
Drs. Linda Sobell and Mark Sobell established the Guided Self-Change (GSC) model for treating substance use disorders while working as professors at the University of Toronto, Canada in the 1980s. The GSC is a brief, motivational cognitive-behavioral harm reduction treatment designed to offer an alternative to abstinent only treatment programs such as Alcoholics Anonymous or 12 steps.

By the 1970s a considerable amount of research began to appear demonstrating that alcohol problems occurred on a continuum ranging from mild to severe, mild cases of alcohol problems were more prevalent than severe cases, and alcohol problems were not necessarily progressive (i.e., problems did not always worsen without treatment or intervention). At the time, the traditional views held that 'low-severity' alcohol problems were simply in the 'early stages' of an irreversible course to severe 'alcoholism' which required anyone with any alcohol problems to be treated with intensive-inpatient facilities. However, research did not endorse that view or the efficacy of such expensive, disruptive, and intensive treatment programs for all alcohol users which inspired the Sobells to develop a cheaper, briefer, and less disruptive treatment program that more people could benefit from. Drawing from research in England on brief interventions for individuals with alcohol use disorder (Orford & Edwards, 1977; Orford, Oppenheimer, & Edwards, 1976), their own work on 'natural recovery' (i.e., recovery from alcohol use problems without formalized treatment; L. C. Sobell, Sobell, & Toneatto, 1992), and emerging work on motivational interviewing (MI) to change behavior (Miller, 1983), the Sobells started to form a new theoretical and treatment model for alcohol use.

One of the most innovative aspects of the GSC model and treatment program is the incorporation of moderation and harm reduction goals over abstinence only. The research at the time suggested that individuals with alcohol related problems preferred non-abstinence goals and that treatments allowing for moderation would increase their motivation to seek treatment than the abstinence only treatment as usual options of the time. By extension, another important difference of the GSC approach is the conceptualization of 'relapse prevention'. Where abstinent only models treat any post-quit drink as a treatment failure which occur due to a lack of skills, the GSC approach assumes that most people have the skills and resources to achieve a successful outcome (as defined by the client) and the goal of treatment is to mobilize those skills.

According to the Sobells:

"Although GSC is similar to other cognitive-behavioral brief interventions for alcohol problems, it also is unique in several ways. First, GSC explicitly allows clients to choose their goal. Second, it routinely uses self-monitoring logs as a clinical procedure, for data collection, and to provide clients feedback in terms of changes in substance use. Third, it includes a cognitive relapse prevention component to provide a realistic perspective on recovery and management of goal violations. Fourth, it is flexible rather than being fixed in its structure (clients can request additional sessions after basic sessions have been completed). Fifth, it includes a planned after care telephone contact 1 month after the last treatment session. Finally, GSC uses brief readings for its decisional balance and problem-solving components." "The GSC approach has been refined and extended to various populations and settings over the years. However, the following elements have been used in most GSC studies: (a) a motivational interviewing style, (b) provision of personalized feedback, (c) brief readings and homework assignments (e.g., decisional balance, problem solving), (d) self-monitoring of substance use, (e) clients select their own goals (with the exception of clients mandated to treatment), and (f) cognitive relapse prevention."

== Examples ==
=== Guided Self-Change Healthy Lifestyles Program ===
From the Guided Self-Change Healthy Lifestyles Program Website:

"The Guided Self-Change (GSC) Healthy Lifestyles outpatient program at Nova Southeastern University's (NSU) College of Psychology offers a unique short-term, evidence-based, non-12 step alternative treatment not available elsewhere in Florida. The GSCC program has been recognized in the Surgeon General's report Facing Addiction in America (November 2016) as an appropriate treatment for individuals who have mild alcohol or drug problems. It also is included the American Psychological Association's (APA) Division 12 (Society of Clinical Psychology) website listing of Empirically Supported Treatments."

"Services are offered for individuals concerned about their use of alcohol, other drugs (prescribed and non-prescribed), and tobacco products. The program also offers services for individuals who want to develop a healthier lifestyle, lose weight, exercise more, quit smoking cigarettes, quit gambling, deal with sleep difficulties, and reduce internet or video game use. This evidence-based, motivational harm reduction program empowers people to take responsibility for their own change and utilize personal strengths for setting and achieving goals."

Though developed in English, services have since been translated to be administered in Spanish. The number of sessions is variable and is determined by individual needs.

== See also ==
- Timeline Followback Method Assessment (Alcohol)
- Linda C. Sobell
- Mark B. Sobell
