= Selden D. Bacon =

American professor (1909–1992)

Selden Daskam Bacon
- Born: September 10, 1909; Pleasantville, New York
- Died: December 6, 1992 (aged 83); Vineyard Haven, Massachusetts
- Education: Yale University
- Scientific career
- Fields: Sociology
- Workplaces: Center of Alcohol Studies

Selden Daskam Bacon (10 September 1909 in Pleasantville, New York – 6 December 1992 in Martha's Vineyard, Massachusetts) was a Yale professor of sociology and an alcoholism researcher. He was director of the Center of Alcohol Studies at Rutgers University from 1962 to 1975. Together with E. Morton Jellinek and Howard W. Haggard, he was an important developer of the disease model of alcohol addiction in the 1940s.

== Biography ==
Selden D. Bacon claimed ancestry to Sir Francis Bacon from several generations back. His father, Selden Bacon, was a constitutional attorney who argued against the constitutionality of Prohibition (the 18th amendment) in the Supreme Court of the United States. Bacon was also the son of the author Josephine Dodge Daskam Bacon (responsible for the first Girl Scout Guidebook) and first cousin to preacher and writer Leonard Bacon.

Bacon earned three degrees from Yale University: a B.A., M.A. in government in 1934, and Ph.D. in sociology in 1939. He taught sociology at Pennsylvania State College (today Penn State University) from 1937 to 1939 and then at Yale. He became full professor at Yale in 1956. Bacon's initial research interest was in criminology. His interest in alcohol studies began when the Connecticut War Council asked him to do a study that compared people in jail for alcohol-related charges to those for other charges, because of a perceived lack of manpower during the war due to drunkenness arrests.

During this time, Bacon first got in touch with the alcohol researches at Yale. In 1944 with the help of the Connecticut Prison Association, Bacon helped start the Yale Plan Clinics, the first public clinics for alcoholics that he thought of after conducting this study in Connecticut jails.

After his contact with Yale researchers at the Laboratory of Applied Physiology (LAP), which later became the Yale Center of Alcohol Studies, he was invited to join as a part-time researcher and part-time sociology instructor. In 1945, he published a review on the movie The Lost Weekend, whose main character was an alcoholic, in the Yale Center's journal. He was appointed director of the LAP and the Summer School of Alcohol Studies from 1950 to 1962. He was also a chairperson to the Connecticut Commission on Alcoholism. In 1962, the Center and Bacon as its director moved to Rutgers University. He retired in 1975.

He died of a heart attack at age 83 at Martha's Vineyard, where his retirement home was located.

== Selected publications ==
- Bacon, Selden D. (1957). "A Sociologist Looks at A.A." (PDF). Minnesota Welfare. 10 (10): 35–44.
