= G. Alan Marlatt =

American psychologist (1941–2011)

Gordon Alan Marlatt
- Born: November 26, 1941; Vancouver, British Columbia, Canada
- Died: March 14, 2011 (aged 69); Warm Beach, Washington, U.S.
- Spouse: Kitty Moore (m. 2010)
- Children: 4

Academic background
- Education: University of British Columbia (B.Sc.); Indiana University (Ph.D.)

Gordon Alan Marlatt (November 26, 1941 – March 14, 2011) was a leading American-Canadian clinical psychologist in the field of addictive behaviors from the 1980s through the 2000s. He conducted pioneering research in harm reduction, brief interventions, and relapse prevention.

== Biography ==
Marlatt was born in 1941 in Vancouver, Canada, to Vera Whitehead and Sholto Marlatt (a Royal Canadian Air Force flight officer who died in 1942).

Marlatt received his bachelor's degree in psychology from the University of British Columbia in 1964, and his Ph.D. in clinical psychology from Indiana University in 1968.

=== Career ===
After serving on the faculties of the University of British Columbia (1968–1969) and the University of Wisconsin–Madison (1969–1972), he joined the University of Washington faculty in the fall of 1972. He eventually became a professor of psychology and director of the Addictive Behaviors Research Center at that institution. He conducted pioneering research in three areas: harm reduction, brief interventions, and relapse prevention.

In 1996, Marlatt was appointed as a member of the National Advisory Council on Drug Abuse of the National Institute on Drug Abuse (NIDA). He served as the president of the Society of Psychologists in Addictive Behaviors from 1983–1984; president of the Section for the Development of Clinical Psychology as an Experimental-Behavioral Science of the Society of Clinical Psychology (Division 12 of the American Psychological Association), 1985–1986; and president of the Association for the Advancement of Behavior Therapy, 1991–1992.

Marlatt's books include Alcoholism: New Directions in Behavioral Research and Treatment (1978), Relapse Prevention: Maintenance Strategies in the Treatment of Addictive Behaviors (1985), Assessment of Addictive Behaviors (1985), Addictive Behaviors Across the Lifespan (1993), Harm Reduction: Pragmatic Strategies for Managing High-Risk Behaviors (1998), Changing Addictive Behavior (co-authored with Dennis M. Donovan and Jalie Tucker) (1999), Brief Alcohol Screening and Intervention for College Students (BASICS) Manual (1999), and Therapist's Guide to Evidence-Based Relapse Prevention (2007). In addition, he published over 200 book chapters and journal articles and served on the editorial boards of numerous professional journals, including the Journal of Consulting and Clinical Psychology, Journal of Abnormal Psychology, Addictive Behaviors, and Journal of Studies on Alcohol and Drugs.

Marlatt received continuous funding for his research from a variety of agencies including the National Institute on Alcohol Abuse and Alcoholism, the National Institute on Drug Abuse, the ABMRF/The Foundation for Alcohol Research, and the Robert Wood Johnson Foundation. In 1990, Marlatt was awarded the Jellinek Memorial Award for outstanding contributions to knowledge in the field of alcohol studies from the International Society for Biomedical Research on Alcoholism. In 2001, he was given the Innovators in Combating Substance Abuse Award by the Robert Wood Johnson Foundation, and in 2004 he received the Distinguished Researcher Award from the Research Society on Alcoholism. He received the Distinguished Psychologist award for Professional Contribution to Knowledge from the Washington State Psychological Association in 1990 and the Distinguished Scientist Award from the Society for a Science of Clinical Psychology in 2000.

=== Urge surfing ===
Marlatt popularized the concept of "urge surfing" as a coping mechanism for addiction. The strategy involves picturing addictive urges as physical waves that rise in intensity, peak, and eventually crash and subside.

== Personal life ==
Marlatt was married four times. One of his marriages was to writer Daphne Marlatt. He married his fourth wife, Kitty Moore, in Seattle on July 18, 2010. He had one son and three stepchildren.

Marlatt died on March 11, 2011, of kidney failure in Warm Beach, Washington.

== See also ==
- Relapse prevention
