= Internet addiction camp =

Behavioural program

An internet addiction camp is a residential treatment facility for internet addiction disorder. Public concern for this disorder, especially in Asia, has led to the formation of a growing number of such camps, most notably in the People's Republic of China. In China, many of these camps are unregistered, and subsequent reports of abuse have led to backlash. Korea also has a large number of treatment centers, and western countries have also established clinics along similar lines. A 2017 systematic review in the Psychology of Addictive Behaviors noted that correctional, "boot-camp" style programs are largely ineffective, while family-based treatment appeared to be beneficial.

== China ==
Internet addiction is commonly referred to as “electronic opium” or "electronic heroin" in China. A government entity in China became the first governmental body worldwide to recognize internet addiction when it established “Clinical Diagnostic Criteria for Internet Addiction” in 2008. China's Ministry of Health does not formally recognize Internet addiction as a medical condition.

Internet addiction centers in China are private or semi-private. The first such treatment center was founded in 2005. These centers often operate under different titles, such as "special training schools" (Chinese: 特训学校; pinyin: Tèxùn Xuéxiào), “moral education schools”, mental health clinics, martial art schools, education consultation institutions, etc.

Despite the initial idea of treating internet addition, the goal of these camps are often overreached and weaponized into a wide range of issues, including but not limited to skipping school, sexuality, zaolian, mental illness, or practically any behavior that considered disobedient or dissatisfying by the guardians. The scope of these camps is reportedly often expanded to legal adults, being sent to camp by their parents or spouse with various reasons including disagreement, or infidelity in marriage.

=== Mistreatment and abuse ===
In the absence of guidance from the Ministry of Health and a clear definition of Internet addiction, dubious treatment clinics have sprouted up in the country. These institutions operate under different names, such as “special training schools”, claiming to “correct” problematic youth through strict discipline and behavioral re-education. However, numerous reports and investigations have revealed systematic abuse, corporal punishment, and psychological coercion in these facilities. As part of the treatment, many clinics and camps impose corporal punishment upon patients of Internet addiction and some conducted electroconvulsive therapy (ECT) against patients, the latter of which has caused wide public concern and controversy. Several forms of mistreatment have been well-documented by news reports.

==== Confinement ====
One of the most commonly used treatments for Internet-addicted adolescents in China is inpatient care, either in a legal or illegal camp. It is reported that children and teenagers were sent to these camps against their will. Some are seized and bound by staff of the camp, some are drugged by their parents, and some are tricked into treatment, often under impersonation as member of law enforcement agencies.

It is reported that many youths that are over 18 years old, thus are legal adults, are involuntarily sent to camps by their parents or spouse's decision, which raised public concerns and controversy of suspected illegal imprisonment and kidnapping. In 2016, Gao Yanlei, who received his Master's degree in law in 2008, was sent to Linyi Mental Hospital by his parents, reportedly resulted in permanent mental trauma. In 2020, an 18-year-old high school student, who notably has won prizes at National Olympiad in Informatics of China and Asia Pacific Robotics Championship, was kidnapped into Hongkai Education in Jinan, Shandong province due to identifying themself as a trans woman and started gender-affirming treatment. In 2026, a 21-year-old university student was tricked by her parents into a camp of Lixuan Education in Sanmenxia, Henan province, due to their disagreement about her dating choice. In 2026, two brothers, 23 and 20 years old, were violently kidnapped into an internet addiction camp in Chongqing by three impersonated polices commissioned by their father. They tried to resist by force and self-harming, suffered from extreme physical assault and resulted in permanent disability and mental disorder.

==== Corporal punishment ====
In many camps and clinics, corporal punishment is frequently used in the treatment of Internet addiction disorder. The types of corporal punishment practiced include, but are not limited to, kilometers-long hikes, intense squats, standing, starving, and confinement. After physical abuse caused the death of an adolescent at a treatment camp in 2009, the Chinese government officially prohibited the use physical violence in such places.

However, corporal punishment remains widespread in Internet addiction camps. Among Internet addiction rehab centers that use corporal punishment in treatment, Yuzhang Academy in Nanchang, Jiangxi Province, is the most notorious. In 2017, the academy was accused of using severe corporal punishment against students, the majority of which are Internet addicts. Former students claimed that the academy hit problematic students with iron rulers, "whip them with finger-thick steel cables", and lock students in small cells week long. Several suicidal cases emerged under the great pressure. In November 2017, the academy stopped operating after extensive media exposure and police intervention.

==== Electroconvulsive therapy ====
In China, electroconvulsive therapy (ECT) is legally used for schizophrenia and mood disorders. Its use in treating adolescent Internet addicts has raised great public concern and stigmatized the legal use of ECT.

The most reported and controversial clinic treating Internet addiction disorder is perhaps the Linyi Psychiatric Hospital in Shandong Province. Its center for Internet addiction treatment was established in 2006 by Yang Yongxin. Various interviews of Yongxin Yang confirm that Yang has created a special therapy, xingnao ("brain-waking") therapy, to treat Internet addiction. As part of the therapy, electroconvulsive therapy is implemented with currents of 1–5 milliampere. As Yang put it, the electroconvulsive therapy only involves sending a small current through the brain and will not harm the recipient. As a psychiatric hospital, patients are deprived of personal liberty and are subject to electroconvulsive treatment at the will of hospital staffs. And before admission, parents have to sign contracts in which they deliver their guardianship of kids partially to the hospital and acknowledge that their kids will receive ECT. Frequently, ECT is employed as a punishment method upon patients who breaks any of the center's rules, including "eating chocolate, locking the bathroom door, taking pills before a meal and sitting on Yang's chair without permission". It is reported in a CCTV-12 segment that a DX-IIA electroconvulsive therapy machine is utilized to correct Internet addiction. The machine was, later on, revealed to be illegal, inapplicable to minor and can cause great pain and muscle spasm to recipients. Many former patients in the hospital later on stood out and reported that the ECT they received in the hospital was extremely painful, tore up their head, and even caused incontinence. An Interview of the Internet addiction treatment center in Linyi Psychiatric Hospital is accessible via the following link. Since neither the safety nor the effectiveness of the method was clear, the Chinese Ministry of Health banned electroconvulsive therapy in treating Internet addiction disorder in 2009.

==== Sexual abuse and coercion ====
There are various reports suggesting frequent sexual abuse and rape in camps. It is reported a 14-year-old teenager and several other students were sexually abused and raped during their stays in Lizheng Quality Education School at Hunan in around 2020. A 13-year-old boy seek police intervention for him being sexually assaulted and raped by an instructor after sent to a special training school in Wuhan, Hubei province in 2022. An instructor at Henan Yashengsi Education Camp, Zhengzhou, Henan province was prosecuted for sexually assault a 15-year-old in 2023.

It is also common in camps that students are forced to undertake sexual acts in exchange of food, daily necessities, opportunity to make external communication, or preventing other forms of mistreatment and abuse.

==== Drugs ====
In Yang's clinic, patients are forced to take psychiatric medication in addition to Jiewangyin, a type of medication invented by himself. Neither the effectiveness nor applicability of the medication has been assessed, however.

==== Physical abuse and death ====
At clinics and rehab centers, at least 12 cases of physical abuse have been revealed by media in the recent years, including seven deaths.

In 2009, a 15-year-old, Deng Senshan, was found dead eight hours after being sent to an Internet-addiction center in Nanning, Guangxi. It is reported that the teenager was beaten by his trainers during his stay in the center.

In 2009, another 14-year-old teenager, Pu Liang, was taken to hospital with water in the lungs and kidney failure after a similar attack in Sichuan Province.

In 2014, a 19-year-old, Guo Lingling, died in an Internet-addiction center with multiple injuries on head and neck in Zhengzhou, Henan.

In 2016, after escaping from an Internet addiction rehab center, a 16-year-old girl tied up and starved her mother to death as revenge for being sent for treatment in Heilongjiang.

In August 2017, an 18-year-old boy, Ao Li, was found dead with 20 external scars and bruises two days after his parents sent him to a military-style boot camp in Fuyang, Anhui.

== South Korea ==
Starting in 2007, the South Korean government has opened more than 140 psychological counseling centers over the whole country to help teenagers get rid of their Internet addiction. Among them, the most notable is the "special training camp" which combines military training, physical training and psychological rehabilitation training. "Networms" aged 16 to 18, spend 12 days in a special life. They rode horses, practiced fight, made pottery, and even played drums. No Internet access during the camp, only one hour of mobile phone everyday and no game.

Equine therapy is a kind of behavior therapy in South Korea, which uses the relationship between horses and people to keep Internet addicts away from the computer and network, so as to help addicts quit Internet overuse. In addition to learn how to ride a horse, the Internet addiction teenagers also accept a variety of professional advisory services. But they think riding could give them the biggest help, because these young people has set up a kind of emotional connection, they would pat their horses, and then run to the snow. Several successful cases have been noted by news since the inception of equine therapy. It is also found that equine therapy is beneficial for quitting other mental health disorder including substance use disorder.

To provide therapeutic help to patients with emotional and behavioral disorders, the Korean equestrian association has offered two treatment centers, treating a total of 50 people daily as of 2013. The association plans to expand 30 more centers around the country by 2022 to meet to growing demand for Internet addiction treatment.

== See also ==
- Teen escort company
- Troubled teen industry
- Yang Yongxin
- Yuzhang Academy Self-cultivation Education School
