= Linda C. Sobell =

American clinical psychologist

Linda Carter Sobell is the President's Distinguished Professor at Nova Southeastern University (NSU) in Fort Lauderdale, Florida. She is a specialist in clinical psychology and addiction. She is the co-founder of NSU's Guided Self-Change clinic, a motivational interviewing trainer, and is board-certified in cognitive and behavioral psychology.

Sobell has been recognized for her research in the addictions field including brief motivational interventions, self-change, and the Timeline Followback Method Assessment. She is a fellow of the American Psychological Association (APA), Canadian Psychological Association, and Association for Behavioral and Cognitive Therapy.

Sobell is the former president of the Society of Clinical Psychology of the APA and the Association for Behavioral and Cognitive Therapies.

== Education ==
Sobell earned a Bachelor of Arts in psychology and linguistics in 1970, followed by a Master of Arts in social sciences in 1974, both from the University of California, Irvine. She earned her Ph.D. in psychology also from the University of California, Irvine in 1976 with a dissertation entitled The validity of self-reports: Towards a predictive model.

== Awards ==
- 1995 Norman E. Zinberg Memorial Lecture Award
- 2006 Betty Ford Award from the Association for Medical Education and Research in Substance Abuse
- 2008 Charles C. Shepard Science Award
- 2010 Distinguished Scientific Contributions to Clinical Psychology Award from the American Psychological Association Society of Clinical Psychology
- 2013 Distinguished Professor Award from Nova Southeastern University
- 2014 Jellinek Memorial Award
- 2018 Lifetime Achievement Award from the Association for Behavioral and Cognitive Therapies

== Timeline Followback ==
Sobell began using the Timeline Followback (TLFB) method in her research in the 1970's, publishing evidence of the TLFB's validity and reliability for alcohol use through the 70's and 80's. In 1992, Sobell published the user manual describing the approach and validation work for the TLFB as applied to alcohol use patterns. Since then, the TLFB has been expanded as an assessment for cannabis, cocaine, smoking, and other substance use behaviors. The TLFB is one of the most highly regarded psychometric methods for obtaining retrospective reports of substance use behaviors. Both the Food and Drug Administration (FDA) and European Union Drugs Agency recommend the TLFB for measuring alcohol use.

The TLFB is a semi-structured interview that uses a calendar prompt and other personally relevant dates to facilitate accurate recall of the number of substance use occasions each day during a given target period. In alcohol clinical trials, the TLFB is administered at a baseline and then multiple times during the treatment period. A variety of drinking endpoints can be derived from the daily number of drinks captured by the TLFB; these include the FDA-recommended endpoints (percentage of subjects abstinent and the percentage of subjects with no heavy drinking days), as well as the World Health Organization (WHO) risk drinking endpoints, among others.

== Guided Self-Change ==
Linda Sobell and Mark Sobell established the Guided Self-Change (GSC) model for treating substance use disorders while working as professors at the University of Toronto in 1984. The GSC is a brief, motivational cognitive-behavioral harm reduction treatment designed to offer an alternative to abstinent only treatment programs such as Alcoholics Anonymous or twelve-step programs. The GSC approach has been shown to improve recovery outcomes in several clinical trials and was recognized by the Surgeon General of the United States's report on Facing Addiction in America (November 2016) as an appropriate treatment for individuals who have mild alcohol or drug problems.

By the 1970's a considerable amount of research began to appear demonstrating that alcohol problems occurred on a continuum ranging from mild to severe, mild cases of alcohol problems were more prevalent than severe cases, and alcohol problems were not necessarily progressive. At the time, the traditional views held that 'low-severity' alcohol problems were simply in the 'early stages' of an irreversible course to severe 'alcoholism' which required anyone with any alcohol problems to be treated with intensive-inpatient facilities. However, research did not endorse that view or the efficacy of such expensive, disruptive, and intensive treatment programs for all alcohol users, which inspired the Sobells to develop a cheaper, briefer, and less disruptive treatment program that more people could benefit from. Drawing from research in England on brief interventions for individuals with alcohol use disorder (Orford & Edwards, 1977; Orford, Oppenheimer, & Edwards, 1976), their own work on 'natural recovery' (i.e., recovery from alcohol use problems without formalized treatment; L. C. Sobell, Sobell, & Toneatto, 1992), and emerging work on motivational interviewing (MI) to change behavior (Miller, 1983), the Sobells started to form a new theoretical and treatment model for alcohol use.

One of the most innovative aspects of the GSC model and treatment program is the incorporation of moderation and harm reduction goals over abstinence only. The research at the time suggested that individuals with alcohol related problems preferred non-abstinence goals and that treatments allowing for moderation would increase their motivation to seek treatment than the abstinence only treatment as usual options of the time. By extension, another important difference of the GSC approach is the conceptualization of 'relapse prevention'. Where abstinent only models treat any post-quit drink as a treatment failure which occur due to a lack of skills, the GSC approach assumes that most people have the skills and resources to achieve a successful outcome (as defined by the client) and the goal of treatment is to mobilize those skills.

According to the Sobells:

"Although GSC is similar to other cognitive-behavioral brief interventions for alcohol problems, it also is unique in several ways. First, GSC explicitly allows clients to choose their goal. Second, it routinely uses self-monitoring logs as a clinical procedure, for data collection, and to provide clients feedback in terms of changes in substance use. Third, it includes a cognitive relapse prevention component to provide a realistic perspective on recovery and management of goal violations. Fourth, it is flexible rather than being fixed in its structure (clients can request additional sessions after basic sessions have been completed). Fifth, it includes a planned after care telephone contact 1 month after the last treatment session. Finally, GSC uses brief readings for its decisional balance and problem-solving components. The GSC approach has been refined and extended to various populations and settings over the years. However, the following elements have been used in most GSC studies: (a) a motivational interviewing style, (b) provision of personalized feedback, (c) brief readings and homework assignments (e.g., decisional balance, problem solving), (d) self-monitoring of substance use, (e) clients select their own goals (with the exception of clients mandated to treatment), and (f) cognitive relapse prevention."

=== Guided Self-Change Healthy Lifestyles Program ===
From the Guided Self-Change Healthy Lifestyles Program Website: "Nova Southeastern University’s Healthy Lifestyles Guided Self-Change (GSC) program offers a unique, short-term, evidence-based, non-12-step alternative treatment not available elsewhere in Florida."

== Works ==
All by Linda Carter Sobell and Mark B. Sobell unless otherwise stated:

- Emerging Concepts of Alcohol Dependence with E. Mansell Pattison (2nd edition, 1977), New York: Springer Publishing, ISBN 0826119506
- Behavioral Treatment of Alcohol Problems: Individualized Therapy and Controlled Drinking (1977), New York: Springer Science+Business Media, ISBN 978-1-4613-3964-9
- Evaluating Alcohol and Drug Abuse Treatment Effectiveness: Recent for Alcohol Problems: A Dialogue with Elliott Ward (1980) Elsevier, ISBN 978-0-08-022997-3
- Problem Drinkers: Guided Self-Change Treatment (1993), Guilford Press, ISBN 978-0898-62212-6
- Assessing Alcohol Problems Using Motivational Interviewing (2008 DVD), APA Psychotherapy Training Videos, ISBN 978-1-4338-0327-7
- Group Therapy for Substance Use Disorders: A Motivational Cognitive-Behavioral Approach (2011), Guilford Press, ISBN 978-1609-18051-5

== See also ==
- Harm reduction
- Guided self-change
- Timeline Followback Method Assessment
