= Jalie Tucker =

American academic

Jalie A. Tucker
- Born: 1954 (age 71–72)
- Education: Duke University; Vanderbilt University
- Scientific career
- Fields: Clinical psychology
- Workplaces: University of Florida
- Doctoral advisor: Mark B. Sobell

Jalie A Tucker (born 1954) is a professor emeritus of Health Education and Behavior at the University of Florida. She is known for her research on impulsive and harmful behaviors, such as alcohol and substance use, the effect of the environment on addiction, and natural resolutions to risky behavior including alcohol misuse. She has received numerous awards for excellence in clinical psychology and addiction research, including the 2015 Award for Distinguished Scientific Contributions to Clinical Psychology from the Society of Clinical Psychology (American Psychological Association Division 12). She was honored by the Society of Addiction Psychology (American Psychological Association Division 50) with the Presidential Award for Service to the Division in 2010 and 2012. Tucker was also named one of the University of Florida's most productive and promising faculty members in 2024 for her excellence in research and scholarly publication in the field of health and human performance.

== Biography ==
Tucker studied chemistry at Stetson University from 1971 to 1973. Subsequently, she attended Duke University, where she graduated with a B.S. in psychology in 1975. Tucker obtained an M.A. (1975) and Ph.D. (1977) in clinical psychology from Vanderbilt University. At Vanderbilt, Tucker worked with Mark B. Sobell in conducting research on alcohol and its effects on behavior, relapse, and recovery from alcohol misuse. In 1998, she completed a M.P.H. in Health Care Organization and Policy at the University of Alabama at Birmingham.

Tucker holds the position of professor emeritus in the Department of Health Education and Behavior at the College of Health and Human Performance at the University of Florida. She is also the director of the Center for Behavioral Economic Health Research at the University of Florida. Tucker's former teaching positions includes the University of Florida, Gainesville (1980–1986), Wayne State University (1986–1989), Auburn University (1989–1999), and University of Alabama at Birmingham (2000–2014). She was a visiting scholar of the Addictive Behaviors Research Center and Department of Psychology at the University of Washington in 1994. Tucker lectures on topics such as stress as a determinant of alcohol usage, historical and contemporary trends of alcohol usage, and alcohol usage as a self-handicapping strategy.

Tucker has received numerous grants for projects, including the CITY Health II Project, Time Horizons and the Behavioral Economics of Recovery from Drinking Problems, and the Recovery and Health Seeking Processes in Problem Drinkers. Jalie Tucker has wrote 4 books and over 135 journal articles, which has received countless research awards and recognitions for her work.

== Research ==
Tucker and her colleagues have studied the effect of the environment on recovery from alcohol abuse and relapse. In one study, she compared individuals who had abstained from alcohol for an average of six years with those who were still active drinkers; in both groups, none of the individuals had received any treatment for substance use. Through interviews, Tucker concluded that individuals who recovered from alcohol misuse had not experienced as many negative events as their peers who had relapsed. In another study examining the relationship between social circumstances and substance abuse, Tucker and colleagues recruited 344 adolescent and young adult residents of low-income neighborhoods in Birmingham, Alabama. They examined the influence of peer pressure by assessing impact of the social network on participants' substance use. The findings confirmed that people who were encouraged by friends and family to use substances had a higher usage rate than those who were discouraged. Tucker's research implies that low-income communities are in need of more prevention programs. She also seeks out further research regarding young adults and their substance use in these areas.

Tucker's work has drawn attention to the positive and negative influences that society can have on a person's substance use. By concluding that society's messages can either help or harm a person, Tucker introduces the need for societal discouragement and better prevention programs. Her work on alcoholic recovery and relapse prevention culminated into a book co-edited with Dennis M. Donovan and G. Alan Marlatt titled Changing Addictive Behavior. In this work, they present alternative therapeutic treatments for those with mild or moderate alcoholism, suggesting that the clinical approach does not work for all people. They proposed that individualized treatments are necessary for recovery, as mild to moderate cases of addiction may not warrant the extensive, and usually more costly, treatment that more severe cases do. This suggestion was also made in her book co-authored with Diane Grimley, Public Health Tools for Practicing Psychologists, which proposes techniques to heighten the effectiveness of clinical care. They suggest that psychological care must become more individualized to each patient's needs.

== Selected publications ==
- Tucker, J. A., Vuchinich, R. E., & Sobell, M. B. (1981). "Alcohol consumption as a self-handicapping strategy". Journal of Abnormal Psychology, 90(3), pp. 220–230.
- Tucker, J. A. (1995). "Predictors of help‐seeking and the temporal relationship of help to recovery among treated and untreated recovered problem drinkers". Addiction, 90(6), pp 805–809.
- George, A. A., & Tucker, J. A. (1996). "Help-seeking for alcohol-related problems: social contexts surrounding entry into alcoholism treatment or Alcoholics Anonymous". Journal of Studies on Alcohol and Drugs, 57(4), pp. 449–457.
- Humphreys, K., & Tucker, J. A. (2002). "Toward more responsive and effective intervention systems for alcohol‐related problems". Addiction, 97(2), pp. 126–132.
- Tucker, J. A., Cheong, J., James, T. G., Jung, S., & Chandler, S. D. (2020). "Preresolution drinking problem severity profiles associated with stable moderation outcomes of natural recovery attempts". Alcohol: Clinical & Experimental Research, 44(3), pp. 738–745.
