= David Lester =

David Lester may refer to:

- David Lester (biochemist) (1926–1990), American biochemist
- David Lester (musician) (born 1958), guitar player for Mecca Normal, book author and publisher
- David Lester (psychologist) (born 1942), British-American psychologist
