= Internet War =

Internet War may refer to:

- 2007 cyberattacks on Estonia
- Cyberattack
- Cyberattacks during the 2008 South Ossetia war
- Cyberterrorism
- Cyberwarfare
- Denial-of-service attack
- Flamewar
- First "Internet" War
- iWar
- 2009 Macanese legislative election#Internet war
- Scientology versus the Internet
- War of Internet Addiction
