= Katie Witkiewitz =

American psychologist

- Born: Rochester, New York, U.S.
- Education: SUNY Potsdam; University of Montana; University of Washington
- Occupation: Psychologist

Katie Witkiewitz is an American psychologist, Distinguished Professor of Psychology at the University of New Mexico in Albuquerque, New Mexico, and Director of the Center on Alcoholism, Substance Abuse, & Addictions, and the Addictive Behaviors and Quantitative (ABQ) Research Lab.

Witkiewitz has been recognized nationally and internationally for her research in the addictions field including harm reduction and mindfulness-based interventions. She is a fellow and past president for the American Psychological Association Division 50 Society of Addiction Psychology, editor for the journal Psychology of Addictive Behaviors, and on the Board of Directors for the International Society for Biomedical Research on Alcoholism.

== Education ==
Witkiewitz was born in Rochester, New York, grew up in North Rose, New York and attended North Rose-Wolcott Central School District. She earned her Bachelor of Arts in Psychology from SUNY Potsdam in 1999, graduating Summa Cum Laude. She earned her MA in Clinical Psychology from the University of Montana in December 2000 with a thesis entitled "Applications of Cusp Catastrophe Models to the Relapse Process". She earned her PhD in Clinical Psychology from the University of Washington in June 2005 with a minor in Quantitative Psychology with a dissertation entitled: " Predicting Alcohol Relapse Using Nonlinear Dynamics and Growth Mixture Modeling" under the mentorship of G. Alan Marlatt.

== Awards ==
Witkiewitz has received several notable awards for her research contributions and leadership such as the Outstanding Leadership in Addiction Psychology in 2017 from the Society of Addiction Psychology and Early Career Achievement Award from the Association for Behavioral and Cognitive Therapies.

== Notable contributions ==
Witkiewitz is considered a leading researcher and advocate for harm reduction treatment goals for alcohol interventions. Traditionally, sustained abstinence has been considered the sole marker of a successful substance use disorder intervention. However, Witkiewitz has demonstrated that reduced alcohol use levels (e.g., 6 drinks daily to 1 drink daily) can lead to substantial improvements in physical health (e.g., blood pressure, liver enzyme levels) and quality of life. In some cases, improvements match the outcomes achieved for abstainers; in others, improvements exceed what has been achieved with abstainers as moderation goals tend to improve early treatment retention.

== Selected books ==
- Witkiewitz, K.; Roos, C. R.; Colgan, D. D.; Bowen, S. (2017). Advances in Psychotherapy: Mindfulness. Göttingen, Germany: Hogrefe Publishing.
- Feldstein-Ewing, S.; Witkiewitz, K.; Filbey, F., eds. (2015). Neuroimaging and Psychosocial Addiction Treatment. Hampshire, UK: Palgrave MacMillan.
- Marlatt, G. A.; Larimer, M.; Witkiewitz, K., eds. (2011). Harm Reduction (2nd ed.). New York: NY, Guilford Press.
- Marlatt, G. A.; Witkiewitz, K. (2008). Addictive Behaviors: New Readings on Etiology, Prevention, and Treatment. Washington, DC: American Psychological Association.
- Witkiewitz, K.; Marlatt, G. A., eds. (2007). Evidence-Based Relapse Prevention. New York: NY, Elsevier Science.
