= Mark B. Sobell =

American psychologist

Mark B. Sobell is an American psychologist who is a professor emeritus at Nova Southeastern University and a specialist in addiction research. He is a fellow of the American Psychological Association (APA) in Divisions 1, 3, 12, 25, 28, 38, and 50, and is certified in cognitive and behavioral psychology and addiction psychology by the American Board of Professional Psychology. He is the co-founder of Healthy Lifestyles: Guided Self-Change at Nova Southeastern University with Linda C. Sobell.

He is the author or editor of 9 books and has published over 270 peer-reviewed articles. He was the associate editor of the American Psychologist and the Journal of Consulting and Clinical Psychology, and serves on six editorial boards. He is the past president of the Society of Clinical Psychology of the APA and was on the APA Publications and Communications Board.

== Education ==
Sobell received his Ph.D. in clinical psychology from the University of California, Riverside, in 1970 with a thesis called A paired comparison method for assessing stimulus control with an application to DRL schedules.

== Awards ==
- 2002 Distinguished Scientific Contribution Award from the American Psychological Association Society of Clinical Psychology
- 2002 Jellinek Memorial Award
- 2008 Charles C. Shepard Science Award
- 2014 Distinguished Scientific Contributions to the Application of Psychology Award from the American Psychological Association Society of Addiction Psychology
- 2015 Brady-Schuster Award from the American Psychological Association Society for Psychopharmacology and Substance Use
- 2018 Career/Lifetime Achievement from the Association for Behavioral and Cognitive Therapies

== Books ==
- Pattison, E. Mansell; Sobell, Mark B.; & Sobell, Linda C. (eds.) (1977). Emerging concepts of alcohol dependence. New York: Springer Publishing.
- Sobell, Mark B. & Sobell, Linda C. (1978). Behavioral treatment of alcohol problems: Individualized therapy and controlled drinking. New York: Plenum Press.
- Sobell, Linda C.; Sobell, Mark B.; & Ward, Elliott (eds.) (1980). Evaluating alcohol and drug abuse treatment effectiveness: Recent advances. New York: Pergamon Press.
- Sobell, Mark B. & Sobell, Linda C. (eds.) (1987). Moderation as a goal or outcome of treatment for alcohol problems: A dialogue. New York: Haworth Press.
- Sobell, Mark B. & Sobell, Linda C. (1993). Problem drinkers: Guided self-change treatment. New York: Guilford Press.
- Klingemann, Harald; Sobell, Linda C.; Barker, Judith C.; Blomqvist, Jan; Cloud, W.; Ellingstad, T.P.; Finfgeld, D.; Granfield, Robert; Hodgins, David; Hunt, Geoffrey; Junker, C.; Peele, S.; Smart, R.; Sobell, Mark B.; & Tucker, Jalie (2001). Promoting self-change from problem substance use: Practical implications for policy, prevention, and treatment. Netherlands: Kluwer Academic Publishers.
- Sobell, Linda C. & Sobell, Mark B. (2011). Group therapy for substance use disorders: A motivational cognitive-behavioral approach. New York: Guilford Press.
- Velasquez, M. Marden; Ingersoll, K.S.; Sobell, Mark B.; & Sobell, Linda C. (2015). Women and drinking: Preventing alcohol exposed pregnancies. Cambridge, MA: Hogrefe Publishing Group.
