= Dora Goldstein =

Pharmacologist and professor

Dora B. Goldstein
- Born: Dora Benedict; April 25, 1922; Milton, Massachusetts, US
- Died: October 2, 2011 (aged 89); Palo Alto, California, US
- Occupation: Pharmacologist
- Years active: 1953–1988
- Known for: Identifying biochemistry of alcohol withdrawal syndrome
- Notable work: Pharmacology of Alcohol (1983)

Dora B. Goldstein (April 25, 1922 – October 2, 2011), nicknamed Dody, was an American pharmacologist and professor who researched the effects of ethanol on the body and the biochemistry of alcohol addiction and alcohol withdrawal syndrome. A Bay Stater, she studied medicine at Bryn Mawr College and Harvard Medical School, with an interruption during World War II to help the war effort, before joining the faculty at Stanford University in the 1950s. Becoming a tenured professor of pharmacology, she was well known for her research and classes keeping on the edge of new biochemical visualization technologies into the 1980s, along with her efforts to promote the advancement of women in science at the university.

Beginning her research in bacterial enzymology and later neurochemistry, Goldstein published a series of papers in the 1970s that broke down how alcohol and its biochemical addiction process functions in mice, breaking the cultural idea of human addiction being a moral failing of the individual. She would continue in the following decades to show how alcohol molecules impact cellular membranes and induce resistance and dependency after long term exposure, along with the genetic markers making an individual higher risk for developing such an addiction.

Receiving several awards for her work on alcoholism, including the Jellinek Memorial Award, she also served as President of the Research Society on Alcoholism. In her personal time, she was highly active in social justice movements, including the civil rights movement of the 1960s and the LGBT rights movement of the 1990s.

== Childhood and education ==
Born as Dora Benedict in Milton, Massachusetts to George Wheeler Benedict and Marjory Pierce Benedict on April 25, 1922, Goldstein went to Bryn Mawr College to obtain a degree in chemistry. Her studies were interrupted by the advent of World War II, which led her to help war technologies by conducting chemical research for the government. Afterwards, she went to Harvard Medical School as a part of its first ever women-allowed class and studied with doctor and pharmacologist Avram Goldstein, whom she married. She finished her Master's Degree in 1949.

== Career ==
In 1955, Goldstein moved to Palo Alto, California with her husband for both of them to become faculty at Stanford University. They both worked at creating the university curriculum for the science program that had been previously lacking. Conducting research in her husband's lab, she focused on the genetic metabolism of bacteria and how genetic adaptation occurs. Her work would eventually have her become a full faculty member, which allowed her to begin independent research on the pharmacology of alcohol. This would eventually result in her achieving tenure as a professor of pharmacology. She would also become a lecturer in the pharmacology course at the university, where she would use new computer-based simulations in the 1980s to teach the molecular structure and chemical composition of pharmacological products.

While at Stanford, she heavily advocated for women in science, joining the university's Professional Women of Stanford Medical School and the Joint Committee on the Status and Tenure of Women organizations to help support female students and faculty. She also became a member of the Katharine McCormick Society, from which she was able to obtain funds for Stanford to create the McCormack Faculty and Postdoctoral Fellows Awards to gift scholarships to prospective women applicants. Later, in 1994, she created a mentoring group at the Stanford Medical School that worked to retain physicians and scientists at the university.

== Research ==
The overall focus of Goldstein's lifelong research was on alcohol addiction and how alcohol enters into the body and causes effects by permeating cell membranes. From a philosophical perspective, her work on drug dependence showing that addiction was a cellular response to toxins in order to reduce the harm said substances cause in the body, along with withdrawal being a physiological response to altered cells no longer having the substance they had altered to work with, ran counter to common sentiment of the time period in the 1960s and 1970s. At the time, being addicted to a substance was seen as a personal moral failing and not something biological and genetic in nature.

Her first scientific publication in 1953 focused on bacterial enzymology, but she soon after took a break from research to raise her children. When she began conducting research again, she changed her focus to enzymology of the brain and produced her first neurochemistry paper in 1966. Then, in multiple studies throughout the early 1970s, she tested the effects of ethanol on mice and increasing levels of alcohol withdrawal. The use of ethanol vapor allowed her to make a system of physical dependence that allowed her to quantitatively measure the handling-induced convulsion (HIC) effect of withdrawal, also allowing her to determine that certain genetic traits increased or lowered the strength of the effect. These mice would serve as general models for the effects of alcoholism on the biochemistry of an organism and other testing of biological and chemical processes of alcohol. Her findings were published in several journal articles along with the textbook she wrote titled Pharmacology of Alcohol, which was published in 1983 by the Oxford University Press.

She presented further research in 1986 at the International Medical Advisory Conference on how alcohol alters the flexibility of cell membranes upon exposure and long term effects include increased membrane rigidity, but also with a higher resistance to alcohol's effects. Speaking at the first National Conference on Alcoholism Research in 1987, she said that advances in understanding of biochemical markers for alcoholism will lead to the ability to determine those who are genetically predisposed for alcoholism and allow for doctors to prescribe lifestyle changes to minimize the risk.

== Organizations ==
After its formation as a sub-organization from the National Council on Alcoholism and Drug Dependence, Goldstein would act as president for the Research Society on Alcoholism.

== Awards and honors ==
Goldstein was given the Award for Scientific Excellence from the National Council on Alcoholism and Drug Dependence in 1981 and the Jellinek Memorial Award in 1996, both for her work on alcoholism.

== Personal life ==
After conducting her studies with him, Goldstein would later marry Avram Goldstein and they would have four children together. She died aged 89 on October 2, 2011, after falling in her home.

Goldstein was active in social justice movements throughout her life, frequently participating in the civil rights movement during the 1960s and becoming vice-president of her local chapter of the NAACP. She also marched every year in the San Francisco Gay Pride Parade during the 1990s, along with being on the national board for the Parents and Friends of Lesbians and Gays (PFLAG).

== Bibliography ==
- — (1983). Pharmacology of Alcohol. Oxford University Press. p. 179. ISBN 9780195031126.
