= Yongxin =

Yongxin may refer to:

- Shi Yongxin, a Chinese monk
- Yang Yongxin, a Chinese psychiatrist
- Yongxin County, in Jiangxi, China
- Yongxin, Shimen (永兴街道), a subdistrict in Shimen County, Hunan Province, China.
