= Yuzhang Academy Self-cultivation Education School =

Location
- Nanchang, Jiangxi, China; 28.663218°N 115.993553°E

Information
- Type: Private non-degree educational institution
- Established: 16 May 2013
- Closed: 3 November 2017
- President: Wu Junbao

Yuzhang College Self-Cultivation Education School was a private non-degree institution established in 2013 in Nanchang City, Jiangxi, China. The school accepted and ‘disciplined’ teenagers with rebellious behavior. Its predecessors were a school for Internet addiction called "Dragon Confession School" established in 2007 and Yuzhang College Moral Education School established at the end of 2011, also referred to as Yuzhang Academy.

The school claimed to ‘focus on self-cultivation courses for young people’. Many students have alleged the school of having a series of corporal punishment policies in place to manage students, and coercing students by physical and mental means to the point of suicide.

The school has aroused widespread public attention after being exposed on the Internet of abuse. At the end of 2017, the school took the initiative to apply for the cessation of operation. In 2019, Yuzhang Academy once again caused widespread discussion on the Internet. In July 2020, the school's founder, Wu Junbao, was found guilty of illegal detention and sentenced to two years and 10 months in prison. In January 2021, the Intermediate People's Court of Nanchang City, Jiangxi Province, revoked the attached civil judgment on the grounds that the facts were unclear and remanded the case for retrial. Nowadays, due to the law not being enforced, many branches of Yuzhang Academy are still running in some cities and towns in China, where children are still being abused and some died.

== Background ==
The predecessor of Yuzhang Academy was established in 2007 as an Internet addiction school called "Dragon Confession School". In June 2010, Wu Junbao applied for the registered trademark "Yuzhang Academy". At the end of 2011, the trademark was successfully registered, and the moral education school of Yuzhang Academy was formally established in Ruxi Wu Village, Luojia Town, Qingshanhu District, Nanchang City. Wu Junbao claimed that the establishment of the academy was the "resumption of learning" of Yuzhang Academy in history, and he hoped to "awaken the improvement of social atmosphere through the return of 'tradition'", and inspire the "post-90s" and "post-00s" with Chinese culture. Li Douluo, the former mayor of Nanchang City, was the honorary principal of the school and endorsed the college On May 16, 2013, Yuzhang Academy's Self-Cultivation Education School was officially established in Wancun, less than 10 minutes away from Wucun and its qualifications are private non-academic educational institutions, and students have moved to the new campus. In January 2014, the college added the job function of general delinquent youth transformation. On February 23 of the same year, the academy was listed as the Guardianship and Mentoring Base for Minors of the Xihu District Procuratorate of Nanchang City, Jiangxi Province, and became the first Guardianship and Mentoring Base for Minors in Jiangxi Province.

== Curriculum ==
According to the public information of the college, the college focuses on the self-cultivation course for young people, involving the learning of the college in the past dynasties, academic training, and even the classical learning of the school, such as uprightness, teaching women, and discipline. Among the textbooks provided by the students are books such as "Teaching Women's Will", "Self-cultivation", and "Psychological Zen". However, the students claimed that "there are fewer actual lectures, and there is more etiquette training such as sitting and standing." In addition, the Law of the People's Republic of China on the Prevention of Juvenile Delinquencystipulates that work-study schools shall strengthen the content of legal education and shall not implement corporal punishment, abuse or discrimination against students. However, a student at the school said that there was "no legal class" in it.

== School management ==
Mr. Zhou, who used to work as a teacher and instructor at Yuzhang Academy, confirmed to the Legal Evening News that new students are forced to enter the "boring room" (called the "little black room" by students) for seven days after entering the school, during which students are unable to go out and are sent in three meals a day by staff. According to a student at the college, the boring room was "a small dark room of about 10 square meters, with some moldy green military quilts and a squat pit next to the bed." The official explanation of Yuzhang Academy calls it "Morita therapy" (Morita therapy advocates isolation and recuperation for the mentally ill). After coming out of the boring room, the new students began to attend classes and live normally. At half past five in the morning, the students begin their day, first worshipping Confucius, performing the "morning ritual", and then studying. In the evenings, the college conducts examinations to comment on everyone's performance, and those who make mistakes are punished with corporal punishment. Depending on the severity of the problem, students were subjected to varying degrees of corporal punishment, sometimes with "Ruler discipline" and sometimes with "dragon whips". Most of the students confirmed that the "dragon whip" was made of steel bar, and some said that it was fiberglass, and some posted photos of their buttocks being beaten to purple black. However, Wu Junbao, the top administrator of the college, said that the "dragon whip" was just a Hollow plastic tube. The school has a set of management methods similar to the Ancient Chinese administrative supervision system. People at different levels of management have different permissions, and there are a series of procedures for reporting penalties. In addition to not being able to ensure adequate protein and other nutrients, there are even incidents such as food poisoning mixed with sundries and rags in the food. In addition to this, the student unions were overworked, and the living conditions were comparable to those of concentration.

In order to prevent students from saying things that are not good for the school, teachers will be watching when students talk to their families on the phone. In order to get out as soon as possible, students will do their best to say good things about the college. At the same time, a student at the college said that in order to cope with the parents' visit, the students had to "act" to create a harmonious scene, and if the students did not cooperate, they would be beaten. When parents came to ask about the school, some students also said that they did not dare to tell the truth, for fear that the teacher would ask the parents to ask, and thus be abused.

== Student suicide ==
Because under high pressure, students are powerless to resist, and some are so desperate that they self-harm and commit suicide. Self-injurious persons often incur penalties for rebar swinging due to the control of metal utensils, most suicide attempts commit suicide by swallowing toothpaste or laundry detergent. Some committed suicide by cutting their hands with disposable plastic cups. However, after the school found out that the suicide was committed and sent to the hospital, it did not dare to sign the critical illness notice and take responsibility, so the student was taken back to the college and washed the stomach by irrigating gastric lavage to induce vomiting, and even until the student vomited blood.

== Timeline of events leading to the closure of school ==
- In 2017, when Yuzhang Academy was full of praise. A certain "classmate Zhou" posted his experience at Yuzhang Academy on Baidu Tieba and other places, but it was deleted. And in July, he was investigated in the name of "swagger and slander".
- On October 16, after "Student Zhou" hit a wall in all aspects, he found the blogger "Gentle" on Zhihu and sent a private message, added QQ, and talked about things in Yuzhang Academy. On the same day, Zhihu user "Gentle" was inspired by Zhou, who "escaped" from Yuzhang Academy, to publish a post "How many Yang Yongxin are there in China" which was also the first negative article about Yuzhang Academy. After breaking the news that there were problems in the self-cultivation education school of Nanchang Yuzhang Academy, Yuzhang Academy aroused widespread public attention. Wu Junbao, the principal of Yuzhang Academy, found "Gentleness" and said that he provided evidence and hoped that the other party would delete the article. In the process of discussing with him, he admitted several things and made the official website of Yuzhang Academy close.
- On October 27, the relevant departments of Qingshanhu District, Nanchang City, investigated and said that the problem part of the post did exist, and instructed the District Education, Science and Sports Bureau to punish the school's educational institutions and relevant responsible persons.
- On October 28, Weibo user "Shan Nyima Dawang" published his experience which received a great response and attracted the attention of the Beijing News and the video was later reposted by several media outlets, including CCTV.
- On October 30, Wu Junbao, the executive chief of Yuzhang Academy, responded in the circle of friends: "All teachers and students officially announced today that they will completely stop using the discipline of the ruler. one of the editors of "The Big Incident" found "Tenderness" and discussed it with him.
- On November 2, Wu Junbao established a media WeChat group and released the news that Yuzhang Academy applied for suspension, saying that because ancient education methods such as "precept ruler" could not be accommodated in the current education system, in addition, the student object was special, and the teacher would be put in danger after stopping the "precept ruler".
- On November 3, the Qingshanhu District Education, Science and Technology Sports Bureau and the Qingshanhu District Civil Affairs Bureau issued a document approving the school's cancellation application and terminating the school. On the same day, CCTV13's "News 1+1" column reported on Yuzhang Academy's "How Should Problem Teenagers Be Handed Over to Problem Schools"
- On November 5, Yuzhang Academy's open day, the Beijing News broadcast the day's event live on Tencent News, which also reflected that although some of the children's parents regretted sending their children to study at the academy some parents pulled banners expressing their support for the school to continue to operate and support the school to tide over the difficulties. But it was questioned by people including "gentleness" that it was "a shareholder investor, a hired trust, and a staff member of Yuzhang Academy".
- On November 7, the relevant person in charge of the Propaganda Department of the Nanchang Qingshanhu District Party Committee said that the qualification of Yuzhang Academy has been cancelled. In accordance with the relevant regulations, the college was ordered to properly resettle the students and teachers within one month, and at the same time, the person in charge said that the public security department had intervened in the matter but there was no follow-up response. And that night, Zhou Wenliang, a former teacher and instructor of the Information Office of Yuzhang Academy, said in an interview that during his work in the college, in addition to beating students with a ring ruler, he also saw a student complaining with his own eyes.
- On November 8, 12 days after the article "How Many Yang Yongxin Are There in China", Yuzhang Academy, which was originally open normally and has accumulated more than 100 million yuan in six years, took the initiative to apply for closure. But a few months later, due to "insufficient evidence", no decision was made to arrest the principal Wu Junbao, and it was returned for further supplementary investigation, and after two years, there was no news.
- On November 9, "Luo Wei" went to the Qingshanhu District Public Security Bureau to report the case, accusing Yuzhang Academy of illegal detention and asking the police to file a case for investigation.
- On November 11, the incident of the violent incident reported and criticized the Yuzhang Academy incident which led to the climax of the later Yuzhang Academy.
- On December 7, the Qingshanhu Branch of the Nanchang Municipal Public Security Bureau issued a "Case Filing Report" based on the joint report of a number of students who had been injured, including "Luo Wei". Yuzhang Academy was formally investigated for the crime of illegal detention. It became the first case of an Internet addiction school.
- In January 2018, CCTV conducted a special investigation and reported on the problems of Yuzhang Academy's specialized school, and filmed the rumored black house and restaurant in the academy, and the dragon whip The so-called Japanese Morita therapy is even more absurd, and the therapy was proposed to target the mentally ill a hundred years ago, but it was later proved to be ineffective, and the academy did not have a medical qualification certificate. In the future, a third-party private evaluation agency will be set up in the society to conduct private inspections of private schools and strengthen the second force outside the government.

== Timeline of subsequent events ==
- In May 2018, "Zimu", one of the main whistleblowers of the Yuzhang Academy incident, attempted suicide.
- In April 2019, the company's name was changed from "Yuzhang Academy" to "Tangyuanwen".
- Due to the suicide of a friend, Zhihu user "Gentle" posted again on October 5, 2019, exposing the retaliation of Yuzhang Academy, which aroused social concern.
- On October 24, the whistleblower "Wen Rou" and a volunteer were threatened with death.
- On October 25, "Gentle" posted a video on Bilibili "Because of the exposure of Yuzhang Academyiend was forced to commit suicide. Soon after, the video became the first place on the Bilibili station rankings, and Bilibili certification numbers "Guizhou Communist Youth League", "Zhejiang Communist Youth League" and "China Chang'an Net" all said in the comment area that "we will continue to pay attention to this incident and transfer relevant information to relevant departments."
- On October 28, the Beijing News commented on the incident and published a video of an interview with a graduated female student from Yuzhang Academy. While expressing concern about the investigation process, results, and handling results, we should not relax our vigilance against subsequent developments.
- On October 30, Tianyancha questioned through its official Weibo, saying, "The Yuzhang Academy, which claimed to have applied for closure in November 17, has not been revoked to this day, and in April 2019, the name of one of the companies was changed from 'Yuzhang Academy' to 'Tangyuanwen', and in March 2019, the company is still applying for the trademark of 'Yuzhang Academy'".
- On November 1, Wu Junbao, the former head of Yuzhang Academy, responded to Jiemian News that he had never instructed anyone to threaten the volunteers, and said that he was emaciated and had nothing to do with what happened next.

Subsequently, "Gentleness" continued to post videos related to Yuzhang Academy, and also published another article on Zhihu to expose the mastermind behind Yuzhang Academy and answer questions related to Yuzhang Academy. At the same time, "Gentleness" continues to provide assistance to the victims, as well as liaise with the traffic police and other departments, participating in the construction of the draft.

- "Gentle" believes in the video "Exposing Yuzhang Academy, I also received death threats" that Internet addiction has become a deformed industry, the school threshold is low, and it is extremely deceptive, and in addition, he is unwilling to accept interviews with foreign reporters in order to avoid harming the People's Republic of China, image to make a greater impact. The article said, "Hundreds of victimized students were able to come forward and testify in person that they were arrested by people from Yuzhang Academy pretending to be police. We also have the former Yuzhang Academy instructor who personally participated in the arrest of people across the province by impersonating the police, but was willing to stand up and testify on our behalf (thank you very much to this respectable instructor who was willing to take the risk to stand up). And we also got the fake police ID they used to impersonate the police at the time."
- On November 5, 2019, Gentle published a video "Someone pretended to be my name to cheat money, and actually deceived it!?The unexpected turmoil of the Yuzhang Academy incident...... pointed out that someone was impersonating him to deceive, and suspected that an organization of unknown meaning wanted to muddy the waters.
- On December 18, 2020, Gentle published the video "Save the Children!" sorted out three years of evidence, just to expose them. shows that there are countless institutions similar to Yuzhang Academy that have been openly opened and distributed in China, and have conspired with parents to use deceptive and illegal means to arrest victimized students into Internet addiction schools.
- On December 19, 2020, Gentle published a news, saying that he had received a reminder from industry insiders that according to the chat records, Gentle himself had been targeted. After that, in the news and videos published by BiliBili, a large number of accounts popped up to use words such as "Wen Shengren" and "Wei Shengren" to verbally attack Wen Rou in the comment area. Among them, there are many accounts that claim to be "I am a water army", and even more, directly claim to be hired by their own Wu Junbao.
- On April 28, 2021, Zimu committed suicide.

== Timeline of legal action ==
- On November 12~13, 2019, Wu Moubao and 5 others successively accepted the investigation and confession of the public security organs. The case was later investigated by the Nanchang Qingshanhu Public Security Bureau.
- In January 2020, the Qingshanhu District People's Procuratorate reviewed the prosecution.
- On April 29, the Qingshanhu District People's Court of Nanchang City openly tried the case of illegal detention for the first time through online video.
- On June 4, the victim, Luo Wei, submitted an attached civil complaint against Wu Junbao and others to the Qingshanhu District Court of Nanchang City. On June 9, Luo Wei was entrusted by another person to file a complaint They all demanded a public apology from Wu Junbao and others, a refund of tuition fees, and compensation for medical expenses, transportation expenses, and mental damages, all of which Wu Junbao refused.
- On July 3, the Qingshanhu District People's Court of Nanchang City publicly tried the case of illegal detention for the second time.
- On July 7, the Qingshanhu District People's C.ourt of Nanchang City publicly announced the verdict in the first instance: for the crime of illegal detention, the defendants Wu Moubao, Ren Mouqiang, Zhang, Qu Moukuan, and Chen were sentenced to two years and ten months in prison, two years and seven months, one year and ten months, and eleven months, and Chen X was exempted from criminal punishment. As for the attached civil lawsuit, the court did not support the claim because the evidence provided was insufficient to prove the factual claim and should bear the adverse consequences, and its claim for a public apology, refund of tuition fees and compensation for moral damages did not fall within the scope of attached civil litigation as prescribed by law, so it was not supported.
- On December 30, 2020, the Nanchang Intermediate People's Court issued a ruling on the attached civil case, finding that "the facts of the original judgment were unclear" and remanding the case to the Qingshanhu District Court of Nanchang City for a new trial.
- On March 24, 2021, Luo Wei, the victim of the illegal detention case of "Yuzhang Academy", received a notice of change of jurisdiction from the Qingshanhu District People's Court of Nanchang City. According to the notice, the case has been tried by the Anyuan District People's Court of Pingxiang City, Jiangxi Province.
- On March 31, 2023, the Anyuan District People's Court of Pingxiang City, Jiangxi Province retried the Yuzhang Academy case. In the retrial on the same day, the prosecution made a supplementary indictment, adding the charges of illegal detention of 7 victims on the basis of the original accusation that the defendants illegally detained 12 students. At the same time, the prosecution also recommended that the court impose a five-year ban on Wu Junbao and Ren Weiqiang, and a three-year ban on Zhang Shun and Qu Wenkuan. In the final statement stage, all five defendants pleaded guilty and accepted punishment and apologized on the spot, but the victim student did not accept the defendant's apology, saying that "it will never be forgiven".
- On April 28, 2023, the Anyuan District People's Court of Pingxiang City, Jiangxi Province, publicly pronounced the first-instance verdict in the case of defendants Wu Junbao, Ren Weiqiang, Zhang Shun, Qu Wenkuan, and Chen Bin in a civil lawsuit attached to the criminal case of illegal detention. The court decided to apply a professional prohibition to the defendant at the same time as sentencing him, and sentenced the defendant Wu Junbao to two years and ten months imprisonment and a five-year ban on engaging in education-related occupations; the defendant Ren Weiqiang was sentenced to two years and seven months imprisonment and a five-year ban from engaging in education-related occupations; the defendant Zhang Shun was sentenced to one year and ten months imprisonment and a three-year ban from engaging in education-related occupations; the defendant Qu Wenkuan was sentenced to 11 months imprisonment and a three-year ban from engaging in education-related occupations; and the defendant Chen Bin was exempted from criminal punishment. Defendants Wu Junbao, Ren Weiqiang, Zhang Shun, Qu Wenkuan, and Chen Bin all expressed their acceptance of the judgment and did not appeal; the plaintiffs in the attached civil lawsuit, Zhou XX and Zhao XX, appealed in court, and the defendant in the attached civil lawsuit, Zeng XX, expressed his acceptance of the judgment and did not appeal. The court rejected the plaintiff's claim in the attached civil lawsuit in accordance with law.

== Status of the original site ==
On July 2, 2020, The Beijing News reporter Li Yang visited the school's original site and found that the school had been converted into an art training institution and had been renovated.
