= Relapse prevention =

Method of clinical psychology

Relapse prevention (RP) is a cognitive-behavioral approach to relapse with the goal of identifying and preventing high-risk situations such as unhealthy substance use, obsessive-compulsive behavior, sexual offending, obesity, and depression. It is an important component in the treatment process for alcohol use disorder, or alcohol dependence. This model founding is attributed to Terence Gorski's 1986 book Staying Sober.

== Underlying assumptions ==
Relapse is seen as both an outcome and a step in the process of behavior change. An initial setback or lapse may translate into either a return to the previous problematic behavior, known as relapse, or the individual turning again towards positive change, called prolapse. A relapse often occurs in the following stages: emotional relapse, mental relapse, and finally, physical relapse. Each stage is characterized by feelings, thoughts, and actions that ultimately lead to the individual's returning to their old behavior.

Relapse is thought to be multi-determined, especially by self-efficacy, outcome expectancies, craving, motivation, coping, emotional states, and interpersonal factors. In particular, high self-efficacy, negative outcome expectancies, potent availability of coping skills following treatment, positive affect, and functional social support are expected to predict positive outcome. Craving has not historically been shown to serve as a strong predictor of relapse.

== Techniques ==
Relapse prevention techniques can include having booster sessions with a therapist, being vigilant for and trying to prevent or avoid high risk situations, and being ready to re-apply previously used therapies if a disturbance does occur.

== Efficacy and effectiveness ==
Carroll et al. conducted a review of 24 other trials and concluded that RP was more effective than no treatment and was equally effective as other active treatments such as supportive psychotherapy and interpersonal therapy in improving substance use outcomes. Irvin and colleagues also conducted a meta-analysis of RP techniques in the treatment of alcohol, tobacco, cocaine, and polysubstance use, and upon reviewing 26 studies, concluded that RP was successful in reducing substance use and improving psychosocial adjustment. RP seemed to be most effective for individuals with alcohol problems, suggesting that certain characteristics of alcohol use are amenable to the RP. Miller et al. (1996) found the GORSKI/CENAPS relapse warning signs to be a good predictor of the occurrence of relapse on the AWARE scale (r = .42, p < .001).

== Prevention approaches ==
=== General prevention theories ===
Some theorists, including Katie Witkiewitz and G. Alan Marlatt, borrowing ideas from systems theory, conceptualize relapse as a multidimensional, complex system. Such a nonlinear dynamical system is believed to be able to best predict the data witnessed, which commonly includes cases where small changes introduced into the equation seem to have large effects. The model also introduces concepts of self-organization, feedback loops, timing/context effects, and the interplay between tonic and phasic processes.

Rami Jumnoodoo and Patrick Coyne, in London UK, have been working with National Health Service users and carers over the past ten years to transfer RP theory into the field of adult mental health. The uniqueness of the model is the sustainment of change by developing service users and carers as 'experts' – following RP as an educational process and graduating as Relapse Prevention Practitioners. The work has won many national awards, been presented at many conferences, and has resulted in many publications.

Terence Gorski MA has developed the CENAPS (Center for Applied Science) model for relapse prevention including Relapse Prevention Counseling (Gorski, Counseling For Relapse Prevention, 1983) and a system for certification of Relapse Prevention Specialists (CRPS).

=== Substance use disorder ===
Relapse prevention is a specific intervention modality in the treatment of substance use disorder that focuses on developing skills and cognitive-behavioral techniques to help patients and their clinicians identify and manage situations that increase the risk of relapse. These situations can include both internal experiences, such as automatic thoughts related to substance use, and external cues, like people or places that are associated with substance use. In the relapse prevention model, patients and clinicians work together to develop strategies that target these high-risk situations, using both cognitive and behavioral techniques. By increasing coping skills and confidence, patients learn to handle challenging situations without turning to alcohol. or drugs, thus increasing their self-efficacy. Riverside Recovery of Tampa describes relapse prevention, coping skills, and emotional regulation as topics covered in structured group therapy within its residential treatment program.

=== Depression ===
For the prevention of relapse in major depressive disorder, several approaches and intervention programs have been proposed. Mindfulness-based cognitive therapy is commonly used and was found to be effective in preventing relapse, especially in patients with more pronounced residual symptoms. Another approach often used in patients who wish to taper down antidepressant medication is preventive cognitive therapy, an 8-week psychological intervention program delivered in individual or group sessions that focuses on changing dysfunctional attitudes, enhancing memories of positive experiences and helping patients to develop personal relapse prevention strategies. Preventive cognitive therapy has been found to be equally effective in preventing a return of depressive symptoms as antidepressant medication use alone in the long-term treatment of major depressive disorder. In combination with pharmaceuticals, it was found to be even more effective than antidepressant use alone.

== See also ==
- Cognitive-behavioral therapy
- Substance use disorder
