= Marcella Lindh =

American soprano (1867–1966)

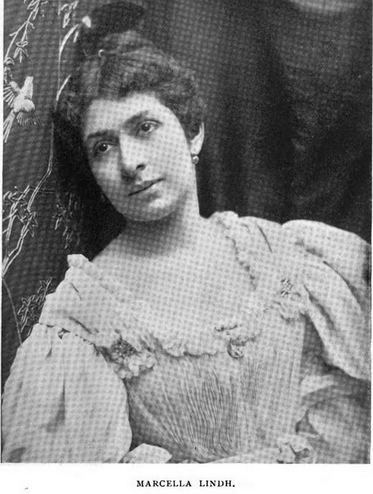
Marcella Lindh, from an 1895 publication.

Rose Jacobson Jellinek (May 19, 1867 – July 30, 1966), known professionally as Marcella Lindh, was an American soprano singer.

== Early life ==
Rose Jacobson was born in Kalamazoo, Michigan, the daughter of Johanna Cohen Jacobson and Solomon E. Jacobson. Her parents were both born in Mecklenburg, Germany. She trained as a singer in Berlin.

== Career ==
Marcella Lindh was the first soprano to sing with the John Philip Sousa Band, joining when the band formed in 1892 and staying into 1894. She sang with the Sousa band at the St. Louis World's Fair in the autumn of 1893. A Pennsylvania newspaper during this time praised her voice as "one of the few incomparable soprano voices of the generation...cultivated to such a nicety of perfection, as makes it a charm to the cultivated ear."

She sang with Hinrich's Grand Opera in Boston in the spring of 1893. She performed in a series of Wagner operas in German with the New York Symphony under Walter Damrosch, at the Boston Theatre and at the Metropolitan Opera House. Soon after, she moved to Budapest (in Austria-Hungary) with her husband and young son. She taught voice at a conservatory there, and continued performing. During World War I she was "an official visitor for the American Red Cross mission in Hungary."

Marcella Lindh returned to the United States in 1920, and again in widowhood during World War II. She lived in Detroit, Michigan in her later years.

== Personal life ==
Rose Jacobson married Markus Erwin Marcel Jellinek, a theatre manager and publisher from Budapest. Their son, E. Morton Jellinek, became a noted expert on alcoholism. They also had a daughter, Edna. Marcella Lindh was widowed when her husband died in 1939, in Budapest. She died in 1966, aged 99 years, in a Michigan nursing home.
