= Death of Deng Senshan =

2009 death in China

On August 2, 2009, Deng Senshan (born 1993), a Chinese teenager, died while undergoing treatment intended to cure "internet addiction" in Guangxi, China.

== Health condition before death ==
According to his father, Deng Senshan was very healthy and was not a criminal; he just had an internet addiction.

A few days before his death, Deng Senshan went to the beach in Beihai with his family. While swimming in the South China Sea, he rescued a woman struggling in the waves and brought her safely to shore.

== Internet addiction treatment training ==
The Nanning Qihang Rescue Training Camp had no legal qualification to enrol students. After the incident, the local police placed four of the camp’s instructors under criminal detention.

== Death and autopsy ==
On August 1, Deng took part in the training session, and was placed in solitary confinement for failing to complete the instructor’s command, where he was beaten by the instructor.

On August 2, at around 2 a.m., Deng begin vomiting. At 3:15 a.m., he was taken to the Wuxu Health Clinic for emergency treatment. At 3:40 a.m., he was pronounced dead after resuscitation efforts failed. Multiple external injuries were found on his body.

On the evening of August 18, the Nanning Public Security Bureau of Guangxi released the official report on Deng Senshan’s cause of death. The forensic examination concluded that:

邓森山系由于全身多处软组织挫伤致创伤性呼吸窘迫综合征致呼吸、循环衰竭而死亡。 (transl. Deng Senshan died from respiratory and circulatory failure caused by traumatic respiratory distress syndrome resulting from multiple soft-tissue contusions across the body.)

== Aftermath ==
=== Government mediation ===
The case was resolved through mediation by the Jiangnan District Government of Nanning, rather than by a court judgment. The outcome was as follows:

- The parties responsible agreed to pay the victim’s family a total of 1.045 million RMB in compensation and reached additional settlements.
  - The Guangdong Panyu Lizhi Sports Planning Service Department (operator of the Nanning Qihang Rescue Training Camp) paid 500,000 RMB to the family.
  - The Guangxi Electronic Technician School, which had jointly run the camp, provided an additional 400,000 RMB as a “subsidy.”
- The Jiangnan District People’s Government covered approximately 180,000 RMB for the family’s accommodation and living expenses in Nanning during the mediation process.

=== Court trial ===
On February 1, 2010, the trial concerning the death of Deng Senshan at the Nanning Qihang Rescue Training Camp opened in Nanning, Guangxi. Four instructors were prosecuted by the People’s Procuratorate on charges of intentional injury.

The four instructors who beat Deng ranged in age from 19 to 23. Two of them were college students from a normal university in Guangxi, who said they had taken the job as summer job. According to their testimony, the camp imposed strict disciplinary measures on trainees, while publicly claiming that it “did not abuse or physically punish” participants.
