= Timeline Followback Method Assessment =

The Alcohol Timeline Followback Method (TLFB) is a tool developed in 1970 by Linda Carter Sobell and Mark B. Sobell used to assess an individual's alcohol intake. It evaluates an individual's daily drinking and then provides a report of an individual's drinking pattern. Along with this, it looks at the magnitude and variability of drinking. With the timeline summary, it provides a relatively accurate portrayal of one's drinking.

This assessment has been evaluated across several populations (e.g., adolescents, adults, alcohol abusers of varying severity, college students, male and female normal drinkers in the general population).

The number of days drinking assessed varies from 30 to 360 days. Also, this assessment can be completed on the computer, by an interviewer, or by pencil-and-paper. Because of the variation of days, it takes about 10 to 30 minutes to complete.

All forms, instructions, and calendars need to use the timeline followback, including Excel worksheets for alcohol, drugs, and cigarettes (for MACs and PCs) and including foreign translations, are available as free downloads from http://www.nova.edu/gsc/online_files.html.

== See also ==
- Alcohol Use Disorders Identification Test
