= Josephine Daskam Bacon =

American writer

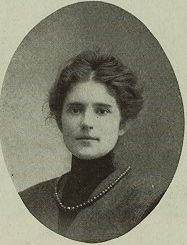
- Born: February 17, 1876; Stamford, Connecticut, United States
- Died: July 29, 1961 (aged 85); Tannersville, New York, U.S.
- Occupations: Novelist, short story writer
- Writing career
- Genre: Realistic fiction

Josephine Dodge Daskam, Mrs. Selden Bacon (February 17, 1876 – July 29, 1961) was an American writer notable for female protagonists, women's issues, juvenile mysteries, poetry, and a few nonfiction works. Her pen names include "Ingraham Lovell", "Josephine Dodge Daskam", and "Josephine Daskam".

== Early life and education ==
Josephine Dodge Daskam was born on February 17, 1876, in Stamford, Connecticut, to Anne (Loring) and Horace Sawyer Daskam. She graduated from Smith College in 1898.

== Career ==
In 1900, Bacon published a collection of ten short stories inspired by her Smith experience, intending "to deepen...the rapidly growing conviction that the college girl is very much like any other girl."

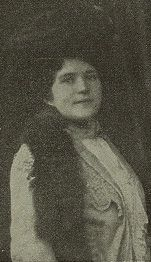
Josephine Daskam Bacon's portrait as published with a review of her volume Poems (1903).

In addition to fiction for young people. others of her works dealt with more serious themes, particularly women's issues and women's roles in complex, contemporary society. She was a pioneer in the Girl Scouts movement and compiled the guidebook used by that organization.

Her books of poetry were well received by critics; as noted by one critic, some of her poetry was set to music. For example, she is credited for the lyrics used in Hymn for Nations (also called Hymn to Nations) set to the Ode to Joy melodic theme of the Finale of the fourth movement of Beethoven's Ninth, as recorded by Paul Robeson, Pete Seeger, and others.

== Personal life ==
In 1903, Josephine Daskam wed Selden Bacon, a lawyer. The couple had three children: Anne, Deborah, and Selden Jr.

Josephine Daskam Bacon died in 1961, aged 85. She was interred in All Souls Onteora Park Church Cemetery, Hunter, Greene County, New York.

== List of works ==
- Smith College Stories (1900)
- Sister's Vocation, and Other Girls' Stories (1900)
- The Imp and the Angel (1901)
- Fables for the Fair (1901)
- The Best Nonsense Verses (ed) (1901)
- Whom the Gods Destroyed (1902)
- The Madness of Philip (1902)
- Poems (1903)
- Middle Aged Love Stories (1903)
- Her Fiancé (1904)
- Memoirs of a Baby (1904)
- The Imp and the Angel (1907)
- The Domestic Adventurers (1907)
- An Idyll of All Fool's Day (1908)
- Ten to Seventeen (1908)
- Margarita's Soul (1909)
- In the Border Country (1909)
- The Biography of a Boy (1910)
- While Caroline Was Growing (1911)
- The Inheritance (1912)
- The Strange Cases of Dr Stanchon (1913)
- The Luck o' Lady Joan (1913)
- To-day's Daughter (1914)
- Open Market (1915)
- Twilight of the Gods (1915)
- On Our Hill (1918)
- The Golden Eaglet (1918 movie)
- Square Peggy (1919)
- The Film of Fate (1919)
- Blind Cupid (1923)
- Truth o' Women (1923)
- Medusa's Head (1926)
- Counterpoint (1927)
- The Luck of Lowry (1931)
- Kathy (1933)
- The Girl at the Window (1934)
- The Room on The Roof (1935)
- Girl Wanted!: A Mystery Story (1936)
- Cassie-on-the-Job (1936)
- The House by the Road (1937)
- The Root and the Flower (1939]
- The Door in the Closet (1940)
- The World in/on His Heart (1941)
