= Avram Goldstein =

Avram Goldstein (3 July 1919 – 1 June 2012) was a professor of pharmacology who was one of the discoverers of endorphins and a noted expert on addiction.

Goldstein established the Pharmacology Department at Stanford University School of Medicine. He was awarded the Franklin Medal and was elected to the National Academy of Sciences. He was an atheist. He was married to pharmacologist Dora Goldstein.
