= Patricia E. Molina =

Physiologist

Academic background
- Education: Universidad del Valle de Guatemala (BS, 1980); Universidad Francisco Marroquín, Guatemala (MD, 1984); Louisiana State University Health Sciences Center New Orleans (PhD, 1990)
- Thesis: Ethanol-Endotoxin interaction with Carbohydrate Metabolism
- Academic advisors: John J. Spitzer; Naji N. Abumrad

Academic work
- Institutions: Universidad del Valle de Guatemala; Universidad Francisco Marroquín, Guatemala; Hospital General San Juan de Dios, Guatemala City, Guatemala; University of South Alabama, Mobile, Alabama; Vanderbilt University, Nashville, Tennessee; State University of New York, Stony Brook; North Shore University Hospital, Manhasset, New York; Brookhaven National Laboratory, Upton, New York; Louisiana State University Health Sciences Center New Orleans, New Orleans, Louisiana

Patricia Molina is the Richard Ashman, PhD Professor and Department Head of Physiology and Director of the Alcohol and Drug Abuse Center of Excellence (ADACE) at Louisiana State University Health Sciences Center New Orleans. In 2015, she was the 88th President of the American Physiological Society, and is the author of the Lange monographic series Endocrine Physiology.

== Life ==
Molina graduated from the Universidad Francisco Marroquín, and from Louisiana State University Health Sciences Center New Orleans with a PhD in physiology.

She was assistant professor of surgery and physiology at the Stony Brook University, director of surgical research at North Shore University Hospital, and guest scientist at Brookhaven National Laboratory prior to joining the Department of Physiology at Louisiana State University Health Sciences Center New Orleans as an associate professor in 1999.

In 2008, she was named the Richard Ashman, PhD Professor (endowed chair) and Department Head of Physiology and was appointed as director of the Alcohol and Drug Abuse Center of Excellence.

Molina is principal investigator and director of the National Institutes of Health-funded Comprehensive Alcohol-HIV/AIDS Research Center, Biomedical Research Training Program, and Medical Student Alcohol Research Internship Program.

In addition to being the first Hispanic woman to be chair of a department of physiology, Molina has served in a number of leadership roles in her discipline. In 2015, she was the first Hispanic woman president of the American Physiological Society. In 2019, she was president of the Association of Chairs of Department of Physiology, and in 2020-2021 served as president of the Research Society on Alcoholism.

Molina's research focuses on the impact of unhealthy alcohol use on risk of behavioral and metabolic comorbidities associated with HIV/AIDS. Her research is currently funded by the National Institute on Alcohol Abuse and Alcoholism of the National Institutes of Health.
