= Center for Drug and Alcohol Programs =

The Center for Drug and Alcohol Programs (CDAP) at Medical University of South Carolina (MUSC) is located in Charleston. The center provides treatment and research for drug, alcohol and substance addiction. It is one of only 14 National Institutes of Health (NIH) funded Alcohol Research Centers in the United States.

In 2012, the Center for Drug and Alcohol Programs, through its affiliation with MUSC’s College of Medicine, ranked as one of America’s Best Graduate Schools for the study of drug and alcohol abuse by the U.S. News & World Report. The director of CDAP is Raymond Anton, M.D. He is an addiction psychiatrist and psychopharmacologist, as well as a professor of psychiatry and behavioral science at MUSC.

== See also ==
- Center of Alcohol Studies
