= David Lester (biochemist) =

American biochemist

- Born: January 22, 1916
- Died: September 15, 1990 (aged 74); Princeton, New Jersey
- Education: Yale University,
- Scientific career
- Fields: biochemistry
- Workplaces: Rutgers University

David Lester (January 22, 1916 – September 15, 1990) was an American biochemist who did extensive studies of alcoholism and was a professor at Rutgers University.

== Life and career ==
He was scientific director of the Center of Alcohol Studies after it moved to Rutgers in 1962. From 1940 to 1980, he was an editorial board member of the Quarterly Journal of Studies on Alcohol (which later became the Journal of Studies on Alcohol and finally the Journal of Studies on Alcohol and Drugs), based at the Center for Alcohol Studies.

In 1938, he married Ruth Weiss (1918-2008). After they moved to Princeton in 1962, she became an assistant editor of the Papers of Thomas Jefferson at Princeton University.

== Acetanilide studies ==
In 1946–1947, while studying at Yale, he coauthored with Leon Greenberg a series of three papers on acetanilide, an analgesic that was still in use at the time, aiming to establish why it caused methemoglobinemia. Although more than half a century had passed since acetanilide was first used clinically, there was wide-ranging disagreement concerning its metabolism, and numerous theories had been postulated. The first of these three papers summarized these theories, and reexamined the proportion of various acetanilide metabolites in human urine. Finding that p-aminophenol conjugates were excreted, they refuted the earlier theories that the accumulation of this substance in the body was causing methemoglobinemia. Of far greater impact was the second paper in this series, showing that paracetamol was a metabolite of acetanilide in the blood. The third paper in the series reported that even large amounts of paracetamol (up to 4 grams per kg of body weight) did not produce methemoglobinemia in albino rats. This observation, together with later studies conducted by Bernard Brodie and Julius Axelrod led to the rediscovery of paracetamol as a drug.
