= Helene Raskin White =

American sociologist (born 1949)

Helene Raskin White (born July 11, 1949) is an American sociologist. She is a Distinguished Professor Emerita in the Center of Alcohol Studies at Rutgers University. White's areas of specialization include alcohol and drug studies, delinquency and crime, violence, longitudinal and survey methodology, and prevention and evaluation research. White has also been involved in the development, implementation and evaluation of numerous alcohol and drug prevention programs.

== Early life and education ==
White was born on July 11, 1949. She completed her Bachelor of Arts, Master of Arts, and PhD degrees in sociology at Rutgers University.

== Career ==
Following her PhD, White remained at Rutgers University as a faculty member in their Department of Sociology. In this role, she was named to the board of directors of Discovery Institute for Addictive Disorders, Marlboro Township. In 2005, White was the co-recipient of the New Jersey Women of Achievement Award. She was shortly thereafter appointed deputy director of Rutgers Rutgers Center for Behavioral Health Services and Criminal Justice Research. In 2016, White's efforts were recognized with an election to the American Society of Criminology.

== Books ==
Loeber, R., Farrington, D., Stouthamer-Loeber, M., White, H.R. & Stallings, R. Violence and Serious Theft: Developmental Course and Origins from Childhood to Adulthood. Mahwah, NJ: Lawrence Erlbaum, (in press).

Pittman, D.J. and H.R. White (Eds.) Society, Culture and Drinking Patterns Reexamined. New Brunswick, NJ: Rutgers Center of Alcohol Studies, 1991.

Gomberg, E.L., H.R. White, and J.A. Carpenter (Eds.) Alcohol, Science and Society Revisited. Ann Arbor: University of Michigan Press and Rutgers Center of Alcohol Studies, 1982.
