= Howard W. Haggard =

American physician, physiologist and writer (1891-1959)

Howard Wilcox Haggard (July 19, 1891 - April 22, 1959) was an American physician, physiologist and writer.

== Career ==
Haggard was born in La Porte, Indiana. He received his B.S. (1914) and M.D. (1917) from Yale University.

In 1917 he worked as a physiologist for the United States Bureau of Mines. During World War I he was a captain in the Chemical Warfare Service in the United States Army. At Yale University, he conducted research into cardiorespiratory physiology and with Yandell Henderson invented the H and H inhalator. Haggard was director of the Laboratory of Applied Physiology at Yale University from 1926–1956.

Haggard was involved in pioneering research into the causes and treatment of alcoholism. He was an editor for the Quarterly Journal of Studies on Alcohol. He died in Fort Lauderdale, Florida.

He was an author of books on the history of medicine which received positive reviews. He was critical of Christian Science and faith healing.

== Publications ==
- Devils, Drugs, and Doctors (1913, 1929)
- The Lame, the Halt, and the Blind: The Vital Role of Medicine in the History of Civilization (1932)
- Mystery, Magic and Medicine: The Rise of Medicine from Superstition to Science (1933)
- The Doctor In History (1934)
- Diet and Physical Efficiency (1935) [with Leon A. Greenberg]
- Man and His Body (1938)
- The Science of Health and Disease: A Textbook of Physiology and Hygiene (1938)
- Alcohol Explored (1942) [with E. Morton Jellinek]
