= Yang Yongxin =

Chinese psychiatrist

- 杨永信
- Born: June 21, 1962 (age 64); Linyi, Shandong, China
- Other names: 电击狂人杨永信; 'Electric Shock Madman Yang'; 磁暴步兵杨永信; 'Tesla Trooper Yang'
- Education: Yishui Medical School
- Occupation: Psychiatrist
- Employer: The Fourth Hospital of Linyi (Linyi Mental Hospital)
- Known for: Using electroconvulsive therapy to treat teenagers who were claimed to have Internet addiction by their parents or relatives
- Political party: Chinese Communist Party
- Awards: Top ten outstanding citizens for minor protection of Shandong; State Council Special Grant

Yang Yongxin (Chinese: 杨永信; born 21 June 1962) is a Chinese psychiatrist who advocated and practiced a highly controversial form of electroconvulsive therapy (ECT) without anesthesia or muscle relaxants as a cure for video game and Internet addiction in adolescents. Yang is currently deputy chief of the Fourth Hospital of Linyi (Linyi Mental Hospital), in the Shandong province of China. He runs the Internet Addiction Treatment Center at the hospital.

According to media reports, families of teenaged patients sent to the hospital paid CNY 5,500 (US$805) per month to be treated using a combination of psychiatric medication and ECT, which Yang dubbed as "xingnao" (醒脑, brain-waking) treatment. He treated 3,000 adolescents before the practice was prohibited by the Chinese Ministry of Health. Yang claimed that 96% of his patients had shown signs of improvement, a figure that was questioned by the Chinese media. Since the ban, Yang has used 'low-frequency pulse therapy', a treatment of his own devising alleged by former patients to be more painful than ECT. In 2016, the center claimed to have treated more than 6,000 adolescents.

== Early life ==
Yang was born in June 1962 in the Chinese city of Linyi, Shandong province. He graduated from Yishui Medical School, a vocational school in Yishui, Shandong, with a degree in Clinical Medicine in 1982. Yang was assigned by the state to the Fourth Hospital of Linyi (also known as Linyi Mental Hospital), where he specialized in treating schizophrenia, depression, anxiety disorder, and obsessive-compulsive disorder. He wrote a series of columns on popular psychology for the local newspaper during his tenure at Linyi Mental Hospital, although his critics alleged the columns were paid advertisements for the hospital. On 29 September 1997, Yang received the honor of becoming a Top 10 Underage Protector in Shandong for his work treating Internet addiction disorder in teenagers.

== Internet addiction treatment ==
According to Yang, he began to investigate Internet addiction in 1999 when his teenage son began to spend more and more time playing video games every day. Yang established an "Internet-addiction camp" inside the Fourth Hospital in 2006 and began practicing ECT. Yang was awarded the Top Ten Outstanding Citizens for Protecting the Minors of Shandong by the Shandong provincial government for the therapy in 2007. In 2008, Yang became the director of the Internet Addiction Treatment Center.

Yang caused widespread controversy in China when its most viewed television channel, the state-run China Central Television (CCTV), aired a special about Yang's treatment center in July 2008. The program, titled Fighting the Internet Demon: Who Turned Our Geniuses into Beasts, reported positively on Yang's ECT therapy and sharply criticized the massively multiplayer online role-playing game (MMORPG) World of Warcraft, then popular in China and blamed for many teenagers' purported Internet addiction. The program initially caused an uproar in China's World of Warcraft community, a sentiment that later spread to most of China's Internet community. Yang's critics revealed some of his most controversial practices, which led to the mainstream media abandoning their praise of his treatment center. Nevertheless, Yang went on to win a State Council grant for excellence in medical science in February 2009.

In May 2009, China Youth Daily, a leading state-run newspaper in China, published a highly negative investigative report on Yang's practices, which received coverage on both China Central Television (CCTV) and other prominent Chinese media, eventually leading to coverage in Science. CCTV-12, in particular, aired a segment featuring a young adult who was drugged by his parents, brought to Yang's clinic and received an hour of ECT. The controversy eventually led to the Chinese Ministry of Health issuing a ban on Yang's use of electroconvulsive therapy. In August, CCTV aired its own investigative report, further questioning the ethics of Yang's treatment center. The report alleged that Yang had received CNY 81 million (US$12.73 million) from his treatment center. As of publishing of the report, more than 3,000 adolescents had experienced the therapy.

=== Treatment program ===
In the controversial July 2008 CCTV coverage of Yang's treatment center, he claimed that patients with alleged Internet addiction suffered from "cognitive and personality disorders". Yang promoted electroconvulsive therapy as a means to remedy such disorders. According to an investigative report, Yang's patients ranged from 12 to 30 years of age. Most of them were abducted by their parents or the "Special Operations", an informal branch of the treatment center that consisted of parents and more senior patients, who were rewarded for their participation in abducting new patients. The parents (even those of adult patients) would then sign a contract with the treatment center placing the patients into foster care by the treatment center. After they were admitted, Yang's patients were allegedly placed into a prison-like environment, where they were forced to reveal all of their online accounts and passwords. Reports also show Yang managing his patients in a military manner, encouraging patients to act as his informants and threatening resisting patients with ECT, which former patients claimed he used solely as a means of torturing them.

In addition to electroconvulsive therapy, Yang used psychotropic drugs, including diazepam, paroxetine, and buspirone, without the consent of patients or their parents, claiming that the drugs were "dietary supplements". The center also had mandatory sessions with psychiatric counselors, where patients were taught obedience to Yang, whom they were forced to call "Uncle Yang". Yang also warned patients against asking their parents to take them home, another offense punishable by ECT.

ECT is generally used for a minimum of a few milliseconds to maximum of 1 minute, but many victims reported that Yang used ECT for up to 30 minutes on them.

After his use of electroconvulsive therapy was banned, Yang continues to practice using another therapeutic method he invented, known as "low-frequency pulse therapy", which is alleged by former patients to be more painful than ECT therapy.

== Controversies ==
=== Unethical treatment controversy ===
Electroconvulsive therapy at Yang's treatment center was performed in "Room 13" (later renamed the "Behavioral Correction Therapy Room" after media scrutiny). Yang claimed that ECT therapy "is only painful for those with Internet addiction" and that the therapeutic machines used "lowered electric current". Investigative reports questioned whether Yang's use of ECT without anesthesia or muscle relaxants on minors, whose informed consent was not obtained, was in violation of the WHO guidelines on electroconvulsive therapy. Reports further accuse Yang of using the therapy as a means of torture. Although ECT had been regulated in some areas in China, Shandong province did not have regulations regarding the therapy.

In response, Yang's supporters claimed that ECT was not the primary form of treatment and that psychiatric counseling was emphasized at the center. Yang stated that admitted patients were shocked only a few times during their treatment. Yang maintained that he was properly licensed in performing ECT, and that his treatment program was fully compliant with Chinese laws and regulations regarding clinical psychology.

Reports also state that Yang applied electric shock to patients' hands, a non-indicated usage that is said to produce more pain, as a punitive measure.

=== Safety of therapy ===
In 2009, China Youth Daily publicized the news of a patient who escaped from Yang's treatment center. He jumped from a second-floor window at the treatment center. The report alleged that Yang's ECT therapy triggered cardiac arrhythmia in the escaped patient, questioning the safety of Yang's therapy.

=== Legality of therapy ===
Some commentators called Yang's practice a violation of patients' basic human rights. Critics contend that Yang's abduction of his patients and use of electroconvulsive therapy may have violated Chinese laws on the protection of minors and may have constituted aggravated assault. Critics maintain that Yang's failure to obtain informed consent may also be in violation of the International Covenant of Civil and Political Rights, which China has signed but not ratified.

The machine Yang used for ECT treatments is a DX-IIA ECT device, manufactured by a Shanghai pharmaceutical company from 1996 to 2000. The manufacturer warned of impaired cognition as a side effect. Chinese health regulation had stopped the device from being manufactured since 2000, and reports brought into question whether Yang acquired these devices illegally.

=== Clinical trial controversy ===
In 2006, Yang claimed to have invented a formula of Chinese traditional medicine that is effective in treating Internet addiction. Yang applied for a patent for his formula, although the Chinese State Intellectual Property Office has not responded to his application. Yang's patent application claims that he had conducted a clinical trial with 300 patients at his treatment center, and that all 300 patients were "completely cured of their addiction by the medication". The patients' informed consent was not sought, and minors as young as 14 years of age were involved in the clinical trial.

=== Diagnostic standard ===
Critics have raised questions about Yang diagnostic standard, claiming that he would admit anyone brought to his treatment center. Yang's published "diagnostic test" is criticized as remarkably lax, as almost any choices on the test will be diagnosed as Internet addiction. In July 2009, celebrity Chinese scholar and anti-pseudoscience crusader Fang Zhouzi published an essay that criticized the notion of Internet addiction and questioned the ethics of electroconvulsive therapy without anesthesia.

=== Government ban ===
In July 2009, the Chinese Ministry of Health issued an official ban on the use of electroconvulsive therapy in treating Internet addiction, citing a lack of evidence as to its effectiveness. However, Yang's treatment center continued to operate after the ban by providing "low-frequency-pulse electronic acupuncture" instead of ECT; critics protested that Yang's new therapeutic methods were designed to torture patients and called for an end to Yang's practice altogether.

=== The controversy re-emerges ===
In August 2016, a blog article titled "Yang Yongxin, a devil still at large" was posted on WeChat and Sina Weibo, and later made its way into Tencent News. By providing a description of Yang, his therapy, and the government ban, the article re-ignited controversies around Yang, leading to an interview of former patients by China Youth Daily. Justice Online, a news site run by the Supreme People's Procuratorate, also reported on deaths and injuries caused by shocks in Yang-style treatments. However, Linyi's local health commission considers Yang's method legitimate; in addition, Yang claimed "governmental support" for his center.

In October 2016, a proposed draft of Regulation on the Online Protection of Minors which refers to terms on controlling Internet addiction was released for public commenting. In response, Justice Online called for a clear definition of "Internet addiction" as well as respect for minors' rights.

In October 2018, a video showing a patient crying after being treated at the Fourth Hospital of Linyi was posted on Sina Weibo. Public concern about Yang's treatment center's existence reheated. Linyi's local health commission later responded that the individual was "an eight-year-old autism patient" and noted that the Yang's treatment center has been closed since August 2016. The video was later deleted by the publisher by order of the police; the publisher publicly apologized for the adverse publicity which the Fourth Hospital of Linyi had experienced. According to The Paper, a Chinese news report website, the hospital has removed words describing the center such as "网戒中心" (internet rehab center). The source also noted the hospital's introduction to Yang said he is good at "curing Internet Addiction and personality abnormality, preventing adolescence's dangerous behavior, fixing family problems", despite the controversies.

== Publications ==
- Zhang, Yang; Du, Guijin; Yang, Yongxin; Qin, Wen; Li, Xiaodong; Zhang, Quan (10 March 2015). "Higher integrity of the motor and visual pathways in long-term video game players". Frontiers in Human Neuroscience. 9 98. doi:10.3389/fnhum.2015.00098. ISSN 1662-5161. PMC 4354361. PMID 25805981.
- Qi, Xin; Du, Xin; Yang, Yongxin; Du, Guijin; Gao, Peihong; Zhang, Yang; Qin, Wen; Li, Xiaodong; Zhang, Quan (3 November 2015). "Decreased modulation by the risk level on the brain activation during decision making in adolescents with internet gaming disorder". Frontiers in Behavioral Neuroscience. 9 296. doi:10.3389/fnbeh.2015.00296. ISSN 1662-5153. PMC 4630310. PMID 26578922.
- Du, Xin; Qi, Xin; Yang, Yongxin; Du, Guijin; Gao, Peihong; Zhang, Yang; Qin, Wen; Li, Xiaodong; Zhang, Quan (28 January 2016). "Altered Structural Correlates of Impulsivity in Adolescents with Internet Gaming Disorder". Frontiers in Human Neuroscience. 10 4. doi:10.3389/fnhum.2016.00004. ISSN 1662-5161. PMC 4729938. PMID 26858620.
- Qi, X; Yang, Y; Dai, S; Gao, P; Du, X; Zhang, Y; Du, G; Li, X; Zhang, Q (2 November 2016). "Effects of outcome on the covariance between risk level and brain activity in adolescents with internet gaming disorder". NeuroImage Clin. 12: 845–851. doi:10.1016/j.nicl.2016.10.024. PMC 5103101. PMID 27857886.
- Du, Xin; Liu, Linlin; Yang, Yongxin; Qi, Xin; Gao, Peihong; Zhang, Yang; Zhu, Jiyu; Du, Guijin; Dai, Shouping; Li, Xiaodong; Zhang, Quan (August 2017). "Diffusion tensor imaging of the structural integrity of white matter correlates with impulsivity in adolescents with internet gaming disorder". Brain and Behavior. 7 (8) e00753. doi:10.1002/brb3.753. ISSN 2162-3279. PMC 5561314. PMID 28828214.
- Du, Xin; Yang, Yongxin; Gao, Peihong; Qi, Xin; Du, Guijin; Zhang, Yang; Li, Xiaodong; Zhang, Quan (December 2017). "Compensatory increase of functional connectivity density in adolescents with internet gaming disorder". Brain Imaging and Behavior. 11 (6): 1901–1909. doi:10.1007/s11682-016-9655-x. ISSN 1931-7557. PMID 27975158.
- Pan, Nannan; Yang, Yongxin; Du, Xin; Qi, Xin; Du, Guijin; Zhang, Yang; Li, Xiaodong; Zhang, Quan (6 March 2018). "Brain Structures Associated with Internet Addiction Tendency in Adolescent Online Game Players". Frontiers in Psychiatry. 9 67. doi:10.3389/fpsyt.2018.00067. ISSN 1664-0640. PMC 5845632. PMID 29559931.

== See also ==
Yang's practice

- Electroshock treatment for internet addiction – article detailing Yang's practice on Chinese Wikipedia

Related practices and controversies

- Internet addiction camp
- Involuntary commitment
- Troubled teen industry
- Judge Rotenberg Educational Center

Cultural responses and criticism

- War of Internet Addiction
