= Brain and Behavior =

- Discipline: Neurology, neuroscience, psychology, psychiatry
- Language: English
- Edited by: Nutan Sharma

Publication details
- History: 2011–present
- Publisher: Wiley-Blackwell
- Frequency: Monthly
- Open access: Yes
- License: Creative Commons Attribution License
- Impact factor: 2.219 (2017)

Standard abbreviations
- ISO 4: Brain Behav.

Indexing
- ISSN: 2162-3279
- OCLC no.: 671244355

Links
- Journal homepage; Online access; Online archive

Brain and Behavior is a monthly peer-reviewed open access scientific journal covering neurology, neuroscience, psychology, and psychiatry. It was established in 2011 and is published by Wiley-Blackwell. The editor-in-chief is Nutan Sharma (Massachusetts General Hospital).

The journal accepts direct submissions as well as submissions referred to them by other Wiley-Blackwell journals. Some of those journals are owned by societies and their members are eligible for discounted publication charges.

== Abstracting and indexing ==
The journal is abstracted and indexed in:

- Academic OneFile
- Embase
- Index Medicus/MEDLINE/PubMed
- ProQuest databases
- Science Citation Index Expanded
- Scopus

According to the Journal Citation Reports, the journal has a 2017 impact factor of 2.219.
