= Psychology of Addictive Behaviors =

- Discipline: Psychology
- Language: English
- Edited by: William R. Corbin

Publication details
- History: 1987-present
- Publisher: American Psychological Association (United States)
- Frequency: 8/year
- Impact factor: 2.7 (2024)

Standard abbreviations
- ISO 4: Psychol. Addict. Behav.

Indexing
- ISSN: 0893-164X (print); 1939-1501 (web)

Links
- Journal homepage

Psychology of Addictive Behaviors is a peer-reviewed academic journal of the American Psychological Association that publishes original articles related to the psychological aspects of addictive behaviors 8 times a year. The outgoing editor-in-chief is Katie Witkiewitz and the incoming one is William R. Corbin.

The journal has implemented the Transparency and Openness Promotion (TOP) Guidelines. The TOP Guidelines provide structure to research planning and reporting and aim to make research more transparent, accessible, and reproducible.

== Abstracting and indexing ==
The journal is abstracted and indexed by MEDLINE/PubMed and the Social Sciences Citation Index. According to the Journal Citation Reports, the journal has a 2024 impact factor of 2.7.
