= War of Internet Addiction =

Anti-censorship machinima advocacy production

- Based on: World of Warcraft
- Distributed by: Tudou
- Release date: January 20, 2010
- Running time: 64 minutes
- Country: China
- Language: Mandarin Chinese

War of Internet Addiction (Chinese: 网瘾战争) is an anti-censorship machinima advocacy production on behalf of the mainland Chinese World of Warcraft community, aesthetically notable for being made entirely in in-universe style. A protest against internet censorship in China, it was first uploaded by video creator nicknamed "Sexy Corn" onto Tudou.com, within days of its release it was banned from a few PRC video sites such as Youku.com, but has since struck a chord with the wider public beyond the gaming community, eventually becoming more popular on-line than Avatar.

The 64-minute video expresses the frustrations of mainland Chinese WoW players being restricted to mainland servers and presents their grievances and normal feelings to the real world, inasmuch they are often marginalized as being Internet addicts dwelling inside virtual worlds. Considered bold and rebellious by the Chinese government, it won the Best Video award in the 2010 Tudou Video Film awards.

== Major themes and players ==
The video agit-prop vigorously satirizes the travails of mainland Chinese WoW players over the latter half of 2009 using the technique of personification; the game itself serves as both stage and a framing device. The numerous conflicts and issues addressed include: electroshock therapy for purported internet addiction; the Chinese government's attempts to censor the internet with mandatory installations of the Green Dam Youth Escort filter; the corporate battle between the PRC's two primary game servers, The9 and Netease, over licensing renewal rights; and finally, the bureaucratic in-fighting between the governmental organs General Administration of Press and Publication and the Ministry of Culture over control of the game. Along the way the video also satirizes and/or parodies numerous Internet tropes, memes, in-jokes, running gags and clichés which are specific to, and endemic to, Chinese net culture as well as certain elements of American pop culture. (Obvious take-offs on certain aspects of the Terminator franchise, for example, bookend the main action of the story, but at one point major characters engage in poetic battle by doing the dozens in Chinese couplets.) Furthermore, given its production of political satire by game engine, War of Internet Addiction counts, not only as an heir to the roman à clef tradition, but as an influential machinima à clef in its own right.

== Oil Tiger Machinima Team ==
This is the third movie by Oil Tiger Machinima Team, released on 21 January 2010. Two days later it was banned on all major Chinese video sharing websites.

During an interview the producer Corndog (Chinese: 性感玉米) stated that up to 100 people were involved in the production and that it took three months to make and cost zero dollars, as all the staff were volunteers.

Corndog elaborated that because the production team were all born in the 1980s, they all grew up playing computer games. They had specifically chosen on-line games as their medium for economic reasons, since outdoor activities involve higher costs. World of Warcraft's superior quality plus the emphasis on team co-operation all gave them a sense of belonging.

In another interview Corndog remarked that he had made the video for fellow WoW players and that he hadn't expected it to resonate with a wider audience. That said, "The last part of the video moved many people, including those who do not play the game, since we actually live in the same society and we are facing the same Internet environment," he said in an emailed response to questions from a Phoenix TV reporter last month. The strong response "should make decision-makers ponder."

The entire video uses the graphics and characters of the on-line version of World of Warcraft (WoW) and includes audio (theme music from Terminator 2: Judgment Day and BonJovi's Bells of Freedom) added by the game's fans from Taiwan and mainland China.

== Allusions and references ==
=== Blue electric lighting ===
Near the beginning (and in some later scenes) there is blue lighting accompanied by low-pitched transformer humming sounds, a foreshadowing of the electro-shock therapy offered by Yang Yongxin, who ultimately proves to be the archvillain of the piece.

=== Room 13 ===
In the video there is discussion about a torture chamber by the name of Room 13, where the suave and evil Uncle Yang would apply electric shock therapy to WoW players to cure them of their "Internet addiction".

Room 13, a place I will never forget, in there, I had experience of ten thousands swords went through my heart, when the electric shock was applied to me, I wished I was dead.

== Kannimei's speech ==
Near the end of the video rebel leader Kannimei, a blue-skinned Tauren, gives a long and impassioned speech (in effect breaking the fourth wall) about the hostile censorship environment facing WoW players, a speech which actually moved some gamers to tears.

== Reception ==
China Daily placed the film on their list of the best ten Chinese films of 2010.
