= Research Society on Alcoholism =

Research Society on Alcohol
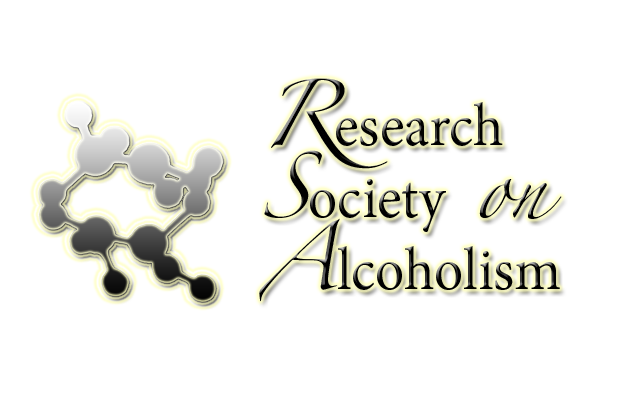
- Abbreviation: RSA
- Formation: 1976
- Purpose: communication forum
- Headquarters: Austin, Texas
- Members: 1,500
- Website: https://researchsocietyonalcohol.org/

The Research Society on Alcohol (RSA) (formerly the Research Society on Alcoholism) is a learned society of over 1,500 active members based in Austin, Texas. Its objective is to advance research on alcohol use disorders and the physiological and cognitive effects of alcohol.

The RSA holds an Annual Meeting, and together with the International Society for Biomedical Research on Alcoholism, sponsors the publication of Alcohol: Clinical and Experimental Research, published by Wiley-Blackwell.

RSA holds elections as needed for Vice President, Secretary, Treasurer, and nine Board Member positions.

== Name Change ==
In 2023, the Research Society on Alcoholism changed its name to the Research Society on Alcohol (RSA).

== Current and Past Presidents ==
Kristen Anderson	2025 - 2026
Michael Miles	2021 - 2022
Patricia E Molina	2020 - 2021
Robert Swift	2019 - 2020
Mary Larimer	2018 - 2019
Cristine Czachowski	2017 - 2018
Kenneth Sher	2016 - 2017
Rueben Gonzales	2015 - 2016
Tamara Phillips	2014 - 2015
Laura Nagy	2013 - 2014
Barbara McCrady	2012 - 2013
Mark Goldman	2011 - 2012
Robert Messing	2010 - 2011
Sara Jo Nixon	2009 - 2010
Peter Monti	2008 – 2009
Raymond Anton	2007 - 2008
Kathleen Grant	2006 – 2007
Michael Charness	2005 - 2006
Victor Hesselbrock	2003 - 2005
Stephanie O’Malley	2001 – 2003
Yedi Israel	1999 - 2001
Edward Riley	1997 - 1999
Ivan Diamond	1995 - 1997
R. Adron Harris	1993 - 1995
Floyd Bloom	1991 - 1993
David Van Thiel	1989 - 1991
Henri Begleiter	1987 – 1989
Ting Kai Li	1985 – 1987
Boris Tabakoff	1983 – 1985
Richard Deitrich	1981 – 1983
Dora Goldstein	1979 – 1981
Charles Lieber	1977 - 1979
