= Charles C. Shepard =

American microbiologist

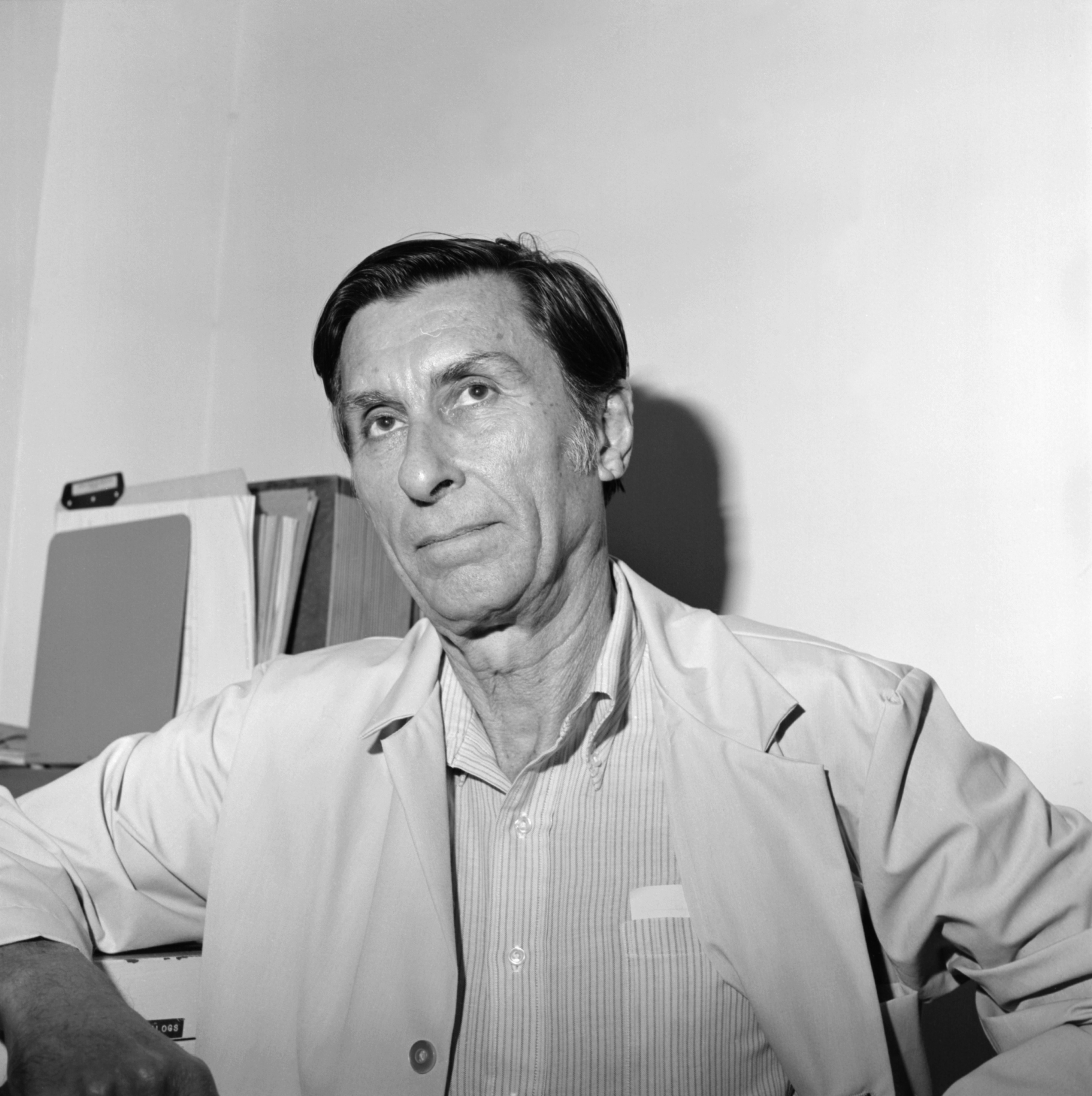
Shepard in 1977

Charles C. Shepard (December 18, 1914 – February 18, 1985) was a microbiologist, and former director of the Centers for Disease Control’s Laboratory Division. It was the diligent efforts of Shepard, and cohort microbiologist Joseph McDade, which led to the 1977 discovery of the initially elusive bacterium Legionella pneumophila, the etiologic agent that causes ‘Legionnaires' disease’. In 1963, he was presented with the Gorgas Medal from the Association of Military Surgeons of the United States (AMSUS).

Shepard was chief of the Leprosy and Rickettsia Branch at CDC for more than 30 years, until his death on February 18, 1985.

Each year the Centers for Disease Control and Prevention (CDC) and the Agency for Toxic Substances and Disease Registry (ATSDR) present the Charles C. Shepard Science Awards to the authors of the most outstanding peer-reviewed research papers published by CDC/ATSDR scientists.

== Early life and education ==
He was born in Ord, Nebraska, on December 18, 1914. He attended Stanford University (1932–1935) and then transferred to Northwestern University, where he received B.S., M.S., and M.D. degrees This article incorporates public domain text from the CDC website, under CDC PHIL image 10136.
