= Association for Behavioral and Cognitive Therapies =

Psychological association in New York City

The Association for Behavioral and Cognitive Therapies (ABCT) was founded in 1966. Its headquarters are in New York City and its membership includes researchers, psychologists, psychiatrists, physicians, social workers, marriage and family therapists, nurses, and other mental-health practitioners and students. These members support, use, and/or disseminate behavioral and cognitive approaches. Notable past presidents of the association include Joseph Wolpe, Steven C. Hayes, Michelle Craske, Jonathan Abramowitz, Marsha M. Linehan, Linda C. Sobell, Kelly D. Brownell, Gerald Davison, and Alan E. Kazdin.

== Mission statement ==
The Association for Behavioral and Cognitive Therapies is an interdisciplinary organization committed to the advancement of a scientific approach to the understanding and amelioration of problems of the human condition. These aims are achieved through the investigation and application of behavioral, cognitive, prevention, and treatment. While primarily an interest group, Association for Behavioral and Cognitive Therapies is also active in:

1. Encouraging the development, study, and dissemination of scientific approaches to behavioral health.
2. Promoting the utilization, expansion, and dissemination of behavioral, cognitive, and other empirically derived practices.
3. Facilitating professional development, interaction, and networking among members.

== Professional activities ==
Through its membership, publications, convention, and education committees, the Association for Behavioral and Cognitive Therapies conducts a variety of activities to support and disseminate the behavioral and cognitive therapies. The organization produces two quarterly journals, Behavior Therapy (research-based) and Cognitive and Behavioral Practice (treatment-focused), as well as its house periodical, the Behavior Therapist (eight times per year). The association's convention is held annually in November. Association for Behavioral and Cognitive Therapies also produces fact sheets, an assessment series, and training and archival videotapes. The association maintains a website on which can be found a "Find-a-Therapist" search engine and information about behavioral and cognitive therapies. The organization provides its members with an online clinical directory, over 30 special interest groups, a job bank, and an awards and recognition program. Other offerings available on the website include sample course syllabi, listings of grants available, and a broad range of offerings to mental health researchers.

== History ==
The Association for Behavioral and Cognitive Therapies was founded in 1966 under the name Association for Advancement of Behavioral Therapies by 10 behaviorists who were dissatisfied with the prevailing Freudian/psychoanalytic model (Its founding members include: John Paul Brady, Joseph Cautela, Edward Dengrove, Cyril Franks, Martin Gittelman, Leonard Krasner, Arnold Lazarus, Andrew Salter, Dorothy Susskind, and Joseph Wolpe). The Freudian/psychoanalytic model refers to the Id, Ego, and Superego within each individual as they interpret and interact with the world and those around them. Although the Association for Behavioral and Cognitive Therapies was not established until 1966, its history began in the early 1900s with the birth of the behaviorist movement. The behaviorist movement was brought about by Pavlov, Watson, Skinner, and other scientists who were primarily concerned with observable behavior. In the early 1900s these scientists were beginning to experiment with conditioning and learning theory. By the 1950s, two entities—Hans Eysenck's research group (which included one of AABT's founders Cyril Franks) at the University of London Institute of Psychiatry, and Joseph Wolpe's research group (which included another of AABT's founders, Arnold Lazarus) in South Africa—were conducting important studies that would establish behavior therapy as a science based on principles of learning. In complete opposition to the psychoanalytic model, "The seminal significance of behavior therapy was the commitment to apply the principles and procedures of experimental psychology to clinical problems, to rigorously evaluate the effects of therapy, and to ensure that clinical practice was guided by such objective evaluation".

The first president of the association was Cyril Franks, who also founded the organization's flagship journal Behavior Therapy and was the first editor of the Association for Advancement of Behavioral Therapies Newsletter. The first annual meeting of the association took place in 1967, in Washington, DC, concurrent with the American Psychological Association's meeting.

An article in the November 1967 issue of the Newsletter, entitled "Behavior Therapy and Not Behavior Therapies" (Wilson & Evans, 1967), influenced the association's first name change from Association for Advancement of Behavioral Therapies to Association for Advancement of Behavior Therapy because, as the authors argued, "the various techniques of behavior therapy all derive from learning theory and should not be misinterpreted as different kinds of behavior therapy...". This issue remains a debate in the field and within the organization, particularly with the emergence of the term "cognitive behavioral therapies." This resulted in yet another name change in 2005 to the Association for Behavioral and Cognitive Therapies.

The Association for Advancement of Behavioral Therapies/Association for Behavioral and Cognitive Therapies has been at the forefront of the professional, legal, social, and ethical controversies and dissemination efforts that have accompanied the field's evolution. The 1970s was perhaps the most "explosive" (see Stuart, 1974) and controversial decade for the field of behavior therapy, as it suffered from an overall negative public image and received numerous attacks from the press regarding behavior modification and its possible unethical uses. In Gerald Davison's (AABT's 8th president) public "Statement on Behavior Modification from the AABT," he asserted that "it is a serious mistake ... to equate behavior therapy with the use of electric shocks applied to the extremities..." and "a major contribution of behavior therapy has been a profound commitment to full description of procedures and careful evaluation of their effects." From this point, AABT became instrumental in enacting legislative guidelines that protected human research subjects, and they also became active in efforts to educate the public.

== Mental professionals ==
The training of mental health professionals has also been a significant priority for the association. Along with its annual meeting, AABT created an "ad hoc review mechanism" in the 1970s through the 1980s whereby a state could receive a review of a behavior therapy program. This led to the yearly publication of a widely used resource, "The Directory of Training Programs". With growing concerns over quality control and standardization of practice, the certification of behavior therapists also became an issue in the 1970s. This debate led to the development of a Diplomate in behavior therapy at APA and for those behavioral therapy practices from a more radical behavioral perspective, the development of certification in behavior analysis at the master level (see professional practice of behavior analysis).

An ongoing debate within the association concerns what many consider to be a movement away from basic behavioral science as the field has attempted to advance and integrate more and more "new" therapies/specializations, particularly the addition of cognitive theory and its variety of techniques. John Forsyth, in his special issue of Behavior Therapy entitled "Thirty Years of Behavior Therapy: Promises Kept, Promises Unfulfilled," summarized this opposition as follows: "(a) cognition is not behavior, (b) behavior principles and theory cannot account for events occurring within the skin, and most important, (c) we therefore need a unique conceptual system to account for how thinking, feeling, and other private events relate to overt human action". The field's desire to maintain its scientific foundations and yet continue to advance and grow, was reflected in its most recent discussion about adding the word "cognitive" to the name of the association.

Many notable scholars have served as president of the association, including Joseph Wolpe, Arnold Lazarus, Nathan Azrin, Steven C. Hayes, and David Barlow. The current chief executive officer of ABCT is Courtney L. White, Ph.D., CAE. For a wealth of historical specifics (governing bodies, lists of editors, past presidents, award winners, SIGs, and conventions from the past 40 years) see ABCT's 40th anniversary issue of the Behavior Therapist.

== About behavioral and cognitive therapies ==
Cognitive and behavioral therapists help people learn to actively cope with, confront, reformulate, and/or change the maladaptive cognitions, behaviors, and symptoms that limit their ability to function, cause emotional distress, and accompany the wide range of mental health disorders. Goal-oriented, time-limited, research-based, and focused on the present, the cognitive and behavioral approach is collaborative. This approach values feedback from the client, and encourages the client to play an active role in setting goals and the overall course and pace of treatment. Importantly, behavioral interventions are characterized by a "direct focus on observable behavior". Practitioners teach clients concrete skills and exercises—from breathing retraining, to keeping thought records to behavioral rehearsal—to practice at home and in sessions, with the overall goal of optimal functioning and the ability to engage in life fully.

Because cognitive behavioral therapy (CBT) is based on broad principles of human learning and adaptation, it can be used to accomplish a wide variety of goals. CBT has been applied to issues ranging from depression and anxiety, to the improvement of the quality of parenting, relationships, and personal effectiveness.

Numerous scientific studies and research have documented the helpfulness of CBT programs for a wide range of concerns throughout the lifespan. These concerns include children's behavior problems, health promotion, weight management, pain management, sexual dysfunction, stress, violence and victimization, serious mental illness, relationship issues, academic problems, substance abuse, bipolar disorder, developmental disabilities, autism spectrum disorders, social phobia, school refusal and school phobia, hair pulling (trichotillomania) and much more. Cognitive-behavioral treatments are subject randomized controlled trials and "have been subjected to more rigorous evaluation using randomized controlled trials than any of the other psychological therapies". There is discussion of using technology to determine diagnosis and host interventions according to research done by W. Edward Craighead. This would be done using “genetic analysis” and “neuroimaging” to create more individualized treatment plans.

== Special interest groups ==
The ABCT has more than 40 special interest groups for its members. These include groups for issues involving African-Americans, Asian-Americans, Hispanics and other ethnic groups such as children and adolescents; couples; gay, lesbian, bisexual and transgender people; students; military personnel; and the criminal justice system. The ABCT works within these groups to overcome addictive behaviors and mental illnesses that may cause negativity in these groups life. A group that the ABCT has supported well is the special interest group of the criminal justice system. The ABCT helps provide the prison system with knowledge of how to more humanely treat those who committed crimes and give people the proper care and attention to become great citizens.
