= E. Morton Jellinek =

American biostatistician and physiologist (1890–1963

- Born: 15 August 1890; New York City, U.S.
- Died: 22 October 1963 (aged 73); Stanford, California, U.S.
- Education: University of Berlin
- Known for: alcoholism research
- Mother: Marcella Lindh (real name Rose Jellinek, née Jacobson)
- Scientific career
- Fields: biostatistics
- Workplaces: Stanford University; Yale University

Elvin Morton "Bunky" Jellinek (15 August 1890 – 22 October 1963), E. Morton Jellinek, or most often, E. M. Jellinek, was an American biostatistician, physiologist, and an alcoholism researcher, fluent in nine languages and able to communicate in four others.

The son of Markus Erwin Marcel Jellinek (1858–1939) and Rose Jellinek (1867–1966), née Jacobson (a.k.a. the opera singer Marcella Lindh), he was born in New York City and died at the desk of his study at Stanford University on 22 October 1963.

== Academic career ==
Jellinek studied biostatistics and physiology at the University of Berlin from 1908 to 1910. He then studied philosophy, philology, anthropology, and theology for two years at the Joseph Fourier University in Grenoble. He was also enrolled, apparently concurrently, at the University of Leipzig from 25 November 1911 to 29 July 1913, and from 22 November 1913 to 2 December 1914 for classes in languages, linguistics and cultural history.

During the 1920s, he conducted research in Sierra Leone and at Tela, Honduras. In the 1930s he returned to the U.S.A. and worked at the Worcester State Hospital, Worcester, Massachusetts, from whence he was commissioned to conduct a study for the Research Council on Problems of Alcohol. The eventual outcome of his study was the 1942 book, Alcohol Addiction and Chronic Alcoholism.

From 1941 to 1952, he was Associate Professor of Applied Physiology at Yale University. In 1941 he was managing editor of the newly established Quarterly Journal of Studies on Alcohol (now the Journal of Studies on Alcohol and Drugs). In 1950 he was engaged by the World Health Organization in Geneva as a consultant on alcoholism, and made significant contributions to the work of the Alcoholism Sub-committee of the WHO's Expert Committee on Mental Health.

The Second Report of the Alcoholism Subcommittee, published in August 1952, have reproduced in its 2nd Annex, the text of an important communication that Jellinek gave to the first European Seminar on Alcoholism in Copenhagen in October 1951.

In that conference, he exposed his work on the Phases of alcoholic addiction and he presented a detailed Chart (page 30) exposing the progressive nature of alcoholism. That chart is considered as the 1st version of the future Jellinek's Curve that some other people, including Max Glatt, would eventually draw from his work.

Upon his retirement from the WHO in the late 1950s, he returned to the USA. In 1958 he joined the Psychiatry Schools of both the University of Toronto and the University of Alberta, and in 1962, he moved to Stanford University in California, where he remained until his death.

== Works ==
Addiction researcher Griffith Edwards (2002, p. 98) holds that, in his opinion, Jellinek's The Disease Concept of Alcoholism was a work of outstanding scholarship based on a careful consideration of the available evidence.

=== Disease concept of alcoholism ===
In 1849, the Swedish physician Magnus Huss (1807–1890) was the first to systematically classify the damage that was attributable to alcohol ingestion. Huss coined the term alcoholism and used it to label what he considered to be a chronic, relapsing disease.

Jellinek coined the expression "the disease concept of alcoholism", and significantly accelerated the movement towards the medicalization of drunkenness and alcohol habituation.

Jellinek’s initial 1946 study was funded by Marty Mann and R. Brinkley Smithers (Falcone, 2003). It was based on a narrow, selective study of a hand-picked group of members of Alcoholics Anonymous (AA) who had returned a self-reporting questionnaire. Valverde opines that a biostatistician of Jellinek’s eminence would have been only too well aware of the "unscientific status" of the "dubiously scientific data that had been collected by AA members".

In his 1960 book he identified five different types of alcoholism, and defined them in terms of their abnormal physiological processes:

In order to differentiate alcoholism not just diachronically, along a time line but also synchronically across groups of people, thus distinguishing types of alcoholics in a way that ran quite counter to the AA emphasis on the unity of all alcoholics, Jellinek came up with the idea of grouping different drinking patterns and naming them by giving each a Greek letter. One might think that the purpose of such a classification is to expand the range of alcoholism and include as many people as possible under the "disease concept"; but, contrary to what the title suggests, Jellinek's 1960 magnum opus in fact tries to limit the scope of the "disease concept", stating that most of the types described might be alcoholics, but they are not diseased – because they do not suffer from "loss of control".

- Alpha alcoholism: the earliest stage of the disease, manifesting the purely psychological continual dependence on the effects of alcohol to relieve bodily or emotional pain. This is the "problem drinker", whose drinking creates social and personal problems. Whilst there are significant social and personal problems, these people can stop if they really want to; thus, argued Jellinek, they have not lost control, and as a consequence, do not have a "disease".
- Beta alcoholism: polyneuropathy, or cirrhosis of the liver from alcohol without physical or psychological dependence. These are the heavy drinkers that drink a lot, almost every day. They do not have physical addiction and do not suffer withdrawal symptoms. This group do not have a "disease".
- Gamma alcoholism: involving acquired tissue tolerance, physical dependence, and loss of control. This is the AA alcoholic, who is very much out of control, and does, by Jellinek's classification, have a "disease".
- Delta alcoholism: as in Gamma alcoholism, but with inability to abstain, instead of loss of control.
- Epsilon alcoholism: the most advanced stage of the disease, manifesting as dipsomania, or periodic alcoholism.

While Jellinek's classification draws a clear (if arbitrary) line between the garden-variety alcoholic and the truly diseased alcoholic, it does not draw such a clear boundary between alcoholism in general and normal drinking. This is Jellinek's Achilles' heel . . .
By relying on cultural norms to define several of his types, he implicitly gives up the project of providing a single, objective, universally valid clinical definition of alcoholism, and opens the door to anthropological nominalistic definitions along the lines of "whatever is normal drinking in that particular culture is normal drinking". (Valverde, 1998, p.112)

The "Jellinek curve" is derived from this classification of Jellinek, and it was named out of respect for Jellinek’s work. Jellinek later completely dissociated himself from this chart's representations; however it is still known as the "Jellinek curve".

=== Recognition of placebo effect ===
In post-war 1946, various pharmaceutical chemicals were in short supply for making medicines. A headache remedy manufacturer found that supplies of one of its remedy’s three constituent chemicals was running out.

They asked Jellinek, then at Yale, to test whether the absence of that particular chemical would affect the drug’s efficacy in any way. Jellinek set up a complex trial – with 199 subjects, divided randomly into four test groups – involving various permutations of the three drug constituents, with a placebo as a scientific control. Each group took a test remedy for two weeks at a time. The trial lasted eight weeks, by the end of which each group had taken each of the test drugs, albeit in a different sequence. Over the entire population of 199 subjects, 120 of the subjects (~60%) responded to the placebo, and 79 did not. The trial also demonstrated that the chemical in question significantly contributed to the remedy's efficacy.

In the process of examining the data produced by his trial, Jellinek discovered that there was a significant difference in responses to the active chemicals between the 120 who had responded to the placebo and the 79 who did not. He (1946, p. 90) described the former group as being "reactors to placebo", and this seems to be the first time that anyone had spoken of either "placebo reactions" or "placebo responses".

== Jellinek Award ==
The Jellinek Memorial Award, or Jellinek Award, is an award presented annually by the Jellinek Memorial Fund in Jellinek's honor. It is given to a scientist who has made an outstanding contribution to research on alcohol or alcoholism. Winners receive a cash prize of US$5,000, as well as a bust of Jellinek with a personalized inscription.

== Selected publications ==
- Haggard, H. W. & Jellinek, E. M., Alcohol Explored, Doubleday, Doran & Company, Inc., (Garden City), 1942.
- Jellinek, E. M. (ed), Alcohol Addiction and Chronic Alcoholism, Yale University Press, (New Haven), 1942.
- Jellinek, E. M. "Clinical Tests on Comparative Effectiveness of Analgesic Drugs", Biometrics Bulletin, Vol.2, No.5, (October 1946), pp. 87–91. doi:10.2307/3001983
- Jellinek, E. M., "Phases in the Drinking History of Alcoholics: Analysis of a Survey Conducted by the Official Organ of Alcoholics Anonymous", Quarterly Journal of Studies on Alcohol, Vol.7, (1946), pp. 1–88. doi:10.15288/QJSA.1946.7.1
- Jellinek, E. M., The Disease Concept of Alcoholism, Hillhouse, (New Haven), 1960.

== See also ==
- Akrasia
- Alcoholics Anonymous
- Disease model of addiction
- Drug tolerance
- Placebo (origins of technical term)
- Selden D. Bacon
