= Journal of Studies on Alcohol and Drugs =

- Discipline: Addiction
- Language: English

Publication details
- Former names: Quarterly Journal of Studies on Alcohol, Journal of Studies on Alcohol
- History: 1940-present
- Publisher: Alcohol Research Documentation (United States)
- Frequency: Bimonthly
- Impact factor: 2.2 (2024)

Standard abbreviations
- ISO 4: J. Stud. Alcohol Drugs

Indexing
- ISSN: 1937-1888 (print); 1938-4114 (web)
- LCCN: 2006256027
- OCLC no.: 77007393
- Quarterly Journal of Studies on Alcohol
- ISSN: 0033-5649
- Journal of Studies on Alcohol
- ISSN: 0096-882X

Links
- Journal homepage; Online access

The Journal of Studies on Alcohol and Drugs (JSAD) is a peer-reviewed scientific journal covering research on alcohol and other drugs. It is the longest-standing substance-related journal in the United States and publishes multidisciplinary research on the biomedical, psychological, and social aspects of substance use, addiction, prevention, treatment, and policy.

JSAD is published by Alcohol Research Documentation, Inc., a nonprofit organization based at the Center of Alcohol and Substance Use Studies at Rutgers University. It is indexed in major academic databases and is widely cited in research, clinical, and policy settings.

== History ==
The journal was originally established in 1940 as the Quarterly Journal of Studies on Alcohol and was later renamed the Journal of Studies on Alcohol in 1975. In 2007, it adopted its current name, Journal of Studies on Alcohol and Drugs, to reflect an expanded scope to drugs other than alcohol.

Throughout its history, JSAD has played a key role in advancing scientific understanding of substance use and addiction. Many of its published studies have influenced public health policies, clinical practices, and prevention strategies.

== Mission and focus ==
JSAD aims to advance scientific knowledge on alcohol and other drug use, promote evidence-based prevention and treatment strategies, and inform public health policies. The journal provides a forum for researchers from diverse disciplines, including medicine, psychology, epidemiology, neuroscience, sociology, and public health.

== Scope and content ==
JSAD publishes original research articles, systematic reviews, and editorials on topics including:

- The biological and neurobiological effects of alcohol and drugs
- Epidemiology and patterns of substance use
- Psychological and psychiatric aspects of addiction
- Social, economic, and public health impacts
- Prevention and treatment strategies
- Legal and policy implications
- The therapeutic potential of psychoactive substances (e.g., psilocybin, ketamine)

== Readership and audience ==
JSAD’s readership includes scientists, clinicians, public health officials, educators, and policymakers. The journal is frequently cited in academic research, government reports, and policy discussions related to substance use and addiction.

== Submission and peer review process ==
JSAD follows a rigorous peer review process, ensuring high scientific standards. Manuscripts undergo evaluation by experts in the field, and final publication decisions are made by the editor and editorial board.

== Special issues and supplements ==
In addition to regular issues, JSAD publishes special issues and supplements on emerging topics in substance use research. These issues focus on areas such as:

- The opioid crisis and harm reduction strategies
- Cannabis policy and health outcomes
- Behavioral addictions, including gambling and internet addiction
- The intersection of mental health and substance use disorders

== Editorial policies and ethics ==
JSAD adheres to strict ethical guidelines to ensure research integrity and transparency. The journal follows policies set by the Committee on Publication Ethics (COPE) and requires authors to disclose potential conflicts of interest. It also supports open science initiatives by encouraging data sharing and replication studies.

== Affiliations and collaborations ==
JSAD is affiliated with the Center of Alcohol and Substance Use Studies at Rutgers University in Piscataway, New Jersey.

== Indexing and impact ==
JSAD is indexed in PubMed, PsycINFO, Scopus, Google Scholar, Web of Science, and nearly all other major academic databases. The journal maintains a strong impact factor, reflecting its influence in addiction research and public health discourse. According to the Journal Citation Reports, the journal's 2024 impact factor is 2.2. With 5,692 total citations in the literature in 2024, JSAD ranks 10th of 60 journals in the Total Citations category for Substance Abuse and 34th of 93 for Total Citations among Psychology journals.

== Editorial leadership ==
The journal is led by an editor-in-chief, supported by an international editorial board comprising experts in addiction science, psychology, medicine, and public health.

== Editors-in-chief ==
The editor-in-chief of the journal as of 1 July 2023 is Jennifer P. Read. Previous editors-in-chief have been Howard W. Haggard (1940–1958), Mark Keller (1958–1977), Timothy Coffee (1977–1984), Jack H. Mendelson and Nancy K. Mello (1984–1991), John Carpenter (1991–1994), Marc A. Schuckit (University of California, San Diego) (1994–2015), and Thomas F. Babor (2015–2023) (University of Connecticut).

== Access and publication model ==
JSAD operates on a nonprofit publishing model and provides select open-access content while maintaining subscription-based access to its full archives.
