= Addiction psychology =

Study and treatment of addiction with the tools of psychology

Addiction psychology is an area of study with in the field of psychology that focuses on diagnosing and treating a person's addiction.About 1 in 7 Americans reportedly suffered from active addiction to a particular substance. Addiction can cause physical, emotional and psychological harm to those affected by it.

== Background ==
=== Definition ===
Addiction psychology is a study of addiction treatment focused on helping individuals overcome and recover from addictions. Typically addiction psychology focuses upon drug and alcohol addictions but can branch out to other addictive habits such as gambling or shopping/spending. Addiction psychology focuses on different theories or techniques to assist an individual in quitting their addiction.

Addiction has long been defined by psychologists as a loss of self-control. Addiction psychology views addictions from both a behavioral standpoint and a disease standpoint understanding there is an innate physiological and psychological layer to having an addiction. It stems from a powerful, rewarding effect that is incredibly difficult to overcome. Those struggling with addiction often find their desire to quit is constantly challenged by an overwhelming urge to give in to temptation.This can lead to an intense "internal psychological battle," where the drive to continue the addictive behavior clashes with the longing to regain control over their action. Addiction psychology focuses on how to treat people through temptation and recovery in the most successful way.

The American Society of Addiction Medicine (ASAM) acknowledges that addiction, while treatable, is a challenging and complex disorder that affects not only many aspects of the person struggling with the addiction but friends, family, and community around them.

=== Common models ===
In the fields of psychology and medicine, there are two models commonly used for understanding the psychology behind addiction itself. One of such models is referred to as the disease model of addiction. This model classifies addiction as a diagnosable disease just as cancer or diabetes. It attributes addiction to a chemical imbalance in an individual's brain associated with genetics or environmental factors.

The other model is the choice model of addiction, which contends that addiction is a result of voluntary actions rather than brain dysfunction. Through this model, addiction is viewed as a choice and is studied through components of the brain such as reward, stress, and memory. Substance addictions may be related to drugs, alcohol and smoking, process addictions are related to non-substance-related behavior, such as gambling, spending money, sexual activity, gaming, spending time on the internet and eating.

== History ==
The word addiction is dated to the 17th century. The consumption of addictive substances, such as alcohol, opioids and cocaine, is reportedly traceable to ancient Syria, China and South America. Some of those abusing narcotics were called opium and morphine "eaters", while the term drunkard referred to alcohol abusers. Particularly, medical textbooks categorized such "bad habits" as dipsomania or alcoholism.

However, it wasn't until the 19th century when addiction diagnoses were first printed in medical literature. In the 1880s, Sigmund Freud and William Halsted began conducting experiments on cocaine users. Freud was convinced that cocaine could be the answer to many mental and physical problems. He published the paper On Coca concerning its benefits.

Being unaware of the drug's powerful addictive qualities, Freud began to recommend it as a means to overcome morphine addictions. Over time, Freud and Halsted inadvertently became guinea pigs in their own research. As a result, their contributions to psychology and medicine changed the world. Freud publicly endorsed cocaine and its uses, theorizing that cocaine could be used as an anesthetic. This idea was later tested and found to be true. However, most of his other claims about cocaine turned out to be false and his advocacy for cocaine severely hurt his career.

Cocaine took possession over Freud's life while he was working in Austria's Vienna General Hospital and found that the drug relieved his migraine. When the effect of cocaine decreased, the amount of cocaine Freud consumed increased. With information about the pain suppressing properties of cocaine, physicians began prescribing cocaine to their patients who required pain relief.

Unaware of Freud and Halsted's experiments with cocaine, American Physician W.H. Bentley was conducting his own similar experiments. The Index Medicus published his article describing how he successfully treated patients with cocaine who were addicted to opium and alcohol. In the late 1800s, the use of cocaine as a recreational drug spread like a worldwide epidemic. It wasn't long until it was realized that cocaine was far more addictive than previously realized and how many deaths were being caused because of cocaine overdose.

As cocaine continued to spread, physicians began looking for ways to treat patients with opium, cocaine, and alcohol addictions. Physicians debated the existence of the label "addictive personality," but believed the qualities Freud possessed (bold risk taking, emotional scar tissue, and psychic turmoil) were of those that fostered the "addictive personality".

=== Important contributors ===
==== Sigmund Freud ====
Physician Sigmund Freud, born on May 6, 1856, in Freiberg, Austrian Empire (an area now known as Pribor in the Czech Republic), was instrumental in the field of psychology. Dream interpretation and psychoanalysis, also known as talk therapy, are two of his well-known contributions. Psychoanalysis is used to treat a multitude of conditions including addictions.

As one of the most influential thinkers in the 20th century, Freud altered the way we perceive ourselves and communicate about our perceptions. A number of his theories have been popularized and terms he created have entered into general language.

Theories on mental health, personality development, and illness that Freud developed, are considered highly controversial. According to Freud, people are endowed with three levels of awareness: conscious, preconscious, and unconscious. The conscious level refers to what we are fully appreciative of; the preconscious, to what people could be aware of if they became more attentive; and the unconscious level includes facts that humans cannot be aware of. The aim of the therapy is to turn unconscious into conscious.

==== William Halsted ====
William Halsted, born on September 23, 1852, in New York City, received his degree in medicine in 1877. Throughout his medical career as a surgeon, he contributed surgical techniques that ultimately led to improvement of the patient's outcome following surgery. During Halsted's professional career, he and Freud conducted experiments with the drug cocaine. While their research was in process, they became guinea pigs for their own experiments when they became addicted to cocaine.

In 1884, he became the first to describe how cocaine could be utilized as a localized anesthetic when injecting into the trunk of a sensory nerve, and how the localized ischemia prolonged the anesthetic properties of the drug.

==== G. Alan Marlatt ====
G. Alan Marlatt was a pioneer in the field of addiction psychology. Born in Vancouver, British Columbia, in 1941, he spent his professional career as an addiction psychologist, researcher, and director of the University of Washington's Addictive Behaviors Research Center and professor in the Department of Psychology.

Marlatt adopted the theory of harm reduction, and developed and scientifically tested ways to prevent an addict's slip from becoming a relapse. He understood that expecting immediate and complete abstinence from addicts often deterred addicts from seeking the help they needed and deserved.

==== A. Thomas McLellan ====
A. Thomas McLellan was born in 1949 in Staten Island, New York. He is a professor at the University of Pennsylvania School of Medicine at the Center for Studies of Addiction. McLellan serves or has served on editorial boards as a reviewer of medical and scientific journals, and as an advisor to government and non-profit organizations including: the National Practice Laboratory of the American Psychiatric Association, and the World Health Organization. He is co-founder and chief executive officer of the Treatment Research Institute located in Philadelphia, Pennsylvania.

McLellan has conducted decades of research for the efficacy of treatment for substance abuse patients, and is recognized both at the national and international level as an addiction psychologist. He is also known for the development of the Addiction Severity Index or ASI and serves as editor-in-chief of the Journal of Substance Abuse Treatment, and the deputy officer of National Drug Control Policy, Research and Evaluation.

==== Arnold M. Washton ====
Arnold Washton has specialized in addiction since 1975 and is an addiction psychologist known for his work in the development of therapeutic approaches to the treatment of drug and alcohol abuse. He is the author of many books and professional journal articles on treatment and addiction. He is a lecturer, clinician, researcher, and has served on the advisory committee for the US Food and Drug Administration. Washton is the founder and executive director of Recovery Options: a private addiction treatment practice located in New York City and Princeton, New Jersey.

==== William L. White ====
William L. White is a Senior Research Consultant at Chestnut Health Systems, an addiction counselor, researcher, and writer in the field of addiction for over 45 years. He wrote over 400 papers and 18 books. He received awards from the National Association of Addiction Treatment Providers (NAATP), the National Council on Alcoholism and Drug Dependence, (NAADAC), the Association of Addiction Professionals, and the American Society of Addiction Medicine (ASAM).

== Addiction ==
Addiction is a progressive psychiatric disorder that is defined by the American Society of Addiction Medicine as "a primary, chronic disease of brain reward, motivation, memory and related circuitry." It is characterized by the inability to control behavior, it creates a dysfunctional emotional response, and it affects the users ability to abstain from the substance or behavior consistently." Psychology Today defines addiction as "a state that can occur when a person either consumes a substance such as nicotine, cocaine, or, alcohol or engages in an activity such as gambling or shopping/spending."

Many functions of the brain work to prevent addictive behaviors. Such obstacles include anxiousness about trying a drug or behavior or nervousness of the possibility of getting caught, etc. Not all use of addictive substances or behavior results in addiction. However, a non-addict may choose to engage in a behavior or ingest a substance because of the pleasure the non-addict receives. A non-addict can become an addict through frequency, when an addictive behavior becomes a compulsive action. The change from non-addict to addict occurs largely from the effects of prolonged substance use and the result of behavior activities on brain functioning. Addiction affects the brain circuits of reward and motivation, learning and memory, and the inhibitory control over behavior. Protective effects are achieved by incorporating social opportunities and socially-based addiction treatments in animal models.

There are different schools of thought regarding the terms dependence and addiction when referring to drugs and behaviors. One adopted belief is that "drug dependence" equals "addiction." The second belief is that the two terms do not equal each other. According to the DSM, the clinical criteria for "drug dependence" (or what we refer to as addiction), include compulsive drug use despite harmful consequences, inability to stop using a drug, failure to meet work, social, or family obligations, and sometimes (depending on the drug), tolerance and withdrawal.

The latter reflects physical dependence in which the body adapts to the drug, requiring more of it to achieve a certain effect (tolerance) and eliciting drug-specific physical or mental symptoms if drug use is abruptly ceased (withdrawal). Physical dependence can happen with the chronic use of many drugs—including even appropriate, medically instructed use. Thus, physical dependence in and of itself does not constitute addiction, but often accompanies addiction. This distinction can be difficult to discern, particularly with prescribed pain medications, where the need for increasing dosages can represent tolerance or a worsening underlying problem, as opposed to the beginning of abuse or addiction.

There are some characteristics of addiction, that regardless of the type, share commonalities. The behavior provides a rapid and potent means of altering mood, thoughts, and sensations of a person, which occur because of physiology and learned expectations. The immediate precipitating factors of the relapse, the timing of the relapse and the rate of relapse following treatment is high. Preventing relapse, across addiction types, is difficult.

== American Psychological Association ==
The American Psychological Association (APA) is a professional psychological organization and is the largest association of psychologists in the United States. Over 100,000 researchers, educators, clinicians, and students support the association through their membership. Their mission statement includes wanting to further available knowledge of psychology for the general public's wellbeing.

APA supports 54 divisions, two of which pertain to addictions. Division 50, Society of Addiction Psychology promotes advances in research, professional training, and clinical practice within the range of addictive behaviors. Addictive behaviors include problematic use of alcohol, nicotine, and other drugs as well as disorders involving gambling, eating, spending, and sexual behavior. Division 28, Psychopharmacology and Substance Abuse promotes teaching, research, and dissemination of information regarding the effects of drugs on behavior.

The College of Professional Psychology (CPP), hosted by the American Psychological Association Practice Organization, previously offered a certificate to psychologists whom demonstrated proficiency in the psychological treatment of alcohol and other substance-related disorders. The CPP maintains the certificate of proficiency for persons who acquired it prior to 2011. The Society of Addiction Psychology certificate will be re-instated while the Society examines other avenues for credentialing professionals in addiction treatment.

== Addiction as a disease ==
Addiction can express itself in numerous different ways and look different in every person that is affected by it. Over the course of many years, researchers and scientists have tried to pinpoint the cause of addiction. This has led to many different theories and explanations for what causes individuals to become relentlessly dependent on drugs, alcohol, or other addictive substances. A few of these theories include, the disease model, the choice model, genetic contributions, the reward effect, and other environmental factors. Following are discussions of each of these theories and their limitations.

=== Disease model in addiction ===
According to the new disease model, rather than being a disease in the conventional sense, addiction is a disease of choice. That is, it is a disorder of the parts of the brain necessary to make proper decisions. As one becomes addicted to cocaine, the ventral tegmentum nucleus accumbens in the brain is the organ. The defect is stress-induced hedonic regulation.

Understanding the impact that genes, reward, memory, stress, and choice have on an individual will begin to explain the Disease Model of Addiction

=== Genetic ===
Studies have proven that genetic variations and differences in our neurobiology can alter an individual's vulnerability to developing an addiction. Estimates have shown that around 40%-60% of the susceptibility of an individual to develop an addiction to drugs, nicotine, and alcohol is allotted to genetic variables. The genetic makeup of an individual determines how they respond to alcohol. What causes an individual to be more prone to addiction is their genetic makeup. For example, there are genetic differences in how people respond to methylphenidate (Ritalin) injections.

=== Reward ===
One of the earliest theories of addiction was the reward effect. This theory suggests that an individual consumes a substance that will elicit a pleasurable effect. The individual continues to use this substance to recreate this same feeling, ultimately becoming addicted to the sensation they receive from the substance. The idea of positive reinforcement has been used to explain why individuals become increasingly dependent on a particular substance. An issue with this theory is that most addictive drugs cause an individual to build up a tolerance and the effects of the drug will decrease as an individual's tolerance increases. This requires individuals to use a higher dosage of the substance which in many causes can cause adverse side effects. Dopamine is correlated with increased pleasure. For that reason, dopamine plays a significant role in reinforcing experiences. It tells the brain the drug is better than expected. When an individual uses a drug, there may be a surge of dopamine in the midbrain, which can result in the shifting of that individual's pleasure "threshold" (see figures one and two).

=== Memory ===
The neurochemical, glutamate, is the most abundant neurochemical in the brain; it is critical in memory consolidation. When an addict discovers an addicting behavior, glutamate plays a role by creating the drug cues. It is the neurochemical in motivation which initiates the drug seeking, thus creating the addiction.

=== Stress ===
When under stress, the brain is unable to achieve homeostasis. As a result, the brain reverts to allostasis, which in turn alters the brains ability to process pleasure, which is experienced at the hedonic "set point" (see figures one). Thus, previous pleasures may become no longer pleasurable. This is also known as anhedonia, or "pleasure deafness". When stressed, the addict may experience extreme craving—an intense, emotional, obsessive experience.

=== Choice ===
An addict may incur damage to the orbitofrontal cortex (OFC), the anterior cingulate cortex (ACC), and the prefrontal cortex (PFC). This damage causes a tendency to choose small and immediate rewards over larger but delayed rewards, deficits in social responding due to decreased awareness of social cues, and a failure of executive function such as sensitivity to consequences.

== Licensed practitioners ==
Many degrees provide space for the treatment of addictions. The educational background that each professional obtains will contain similarities but the philosophy and the viewpoint from which the material is delivered may vary. The required amount of education prior to earning a certificate or degree also varies. A few of the more commonly recognized fields of study are included.

- Psychologist
- Psychiatrist
- Addiction Medicine Specialists
- Licensed Chemical Dependency Counselor
- Licensed Clinical Social Worker
- Licensed Social Worker
- Licensed Professional Counselor
- Paraprofessional

== Recognized certifications ==
Many certifications are recognized in the field of addiction psychology. Each have their own requirements.

- Certification for Alcohol and Drug Counselor Candidate.
- Credentialed Alcoholism and Substance Abuse Counselor.
- A Certified Chemical Dependency Counselor.
- Substance Abuse Counselor/Certified Addiction Counselor.
- The Certified Addiction Professional.
- Certified Addiction Treatment Counselors.
- Combined Certifications With Other Degrees.

== Treatment ==
Both process addiction and behavioral addiction have many dimensions causing disarray in many aspects of the addicts' life. Treatment programs are not a one size fits all phenomenon, hence there are different modalities or levels of care. Effective treatment programs incorporate many components to address each dimension. The addict suffers from psychological dependence and some may suffer from physical dependence.

Helping an individual stop using drugs is not enough. Addiction treatment must also help the individual maintain a drug-free lifestyle, and achieve productive functioning in the family, at work, and in society. Addiction is a disease which alters the structure and function of the brain. The brain circuitry may take months or years to recover after the addict has recovered.

Contingency Management can be a treatment used to treat psychoactive addictions, which aims to change behavior by incorporating positive and negative reinforcements. Some common reinforcers used within contingency management are vouchers, prized-based, methadone take-home dosages, altering the dosage amount, and cash. Based upon the principles of operant conditioning, contingency management treatments involve daily or frequent monitoring such as: the individual addicted to drugs providing a drug free urine sample, then receiving the incentive after showing proof of drug abstinence. Therefore, within operant conditioning, continuing to receive the reward increased drug abstinence.

As an example, within prized-based contingency management, individuals with addictions earn opportunities to draw from a prize bowl each time they provide a negative drug sample, which means the more negative drug samples, the more prizes the individual can win. The prize bowl may contain rewards with slips of paper that say, "Good Job" as praise, "small= $1," "large= $20," or "jumbo= $100." Contingency management has been shown to help individuals struggling with addiction reach abstinence with a wide range of addictive drugs (e.g., alcohol, opiates, cocaine, and nicotine).

This may explain why drug abusers are at risk for relapse even after long periods of abstinence and despite the potentially devastating consequences. Research shows that most addicted individuals need a minimum of 3 months in treatment to significantly reduce or stop their drug use, however treatment in excess of 3 months has a greater success rate. Recovery from addiction is a longterm process.

=== Psychedelics: A Potential Treatment to Some Drug Addictions ===
In recent years, researchers have tested psychedelics as a potential treatment to addiction, specifically serotonergic psychedelics. Psychedelic therapy is an umbrella term for the use of psychedelics to treat a wide range of mental health and addictive disorders. This kind of psychedelic modulates serotonin receptors and may even involve sigma-1 receptors. Some examples of psychedelics which affect the serotonergic receptors are ayahuasca (DMT), LSD, mescaline, and psilocybin. These, amongst other psychedelics, are currently being investigated for their potential to treat drug addiction and SUDs. Although the actions of these psychedelics aren't yet fully understood, some professionals hypothesize that the 5-HT_{2A} agonism "could provoke a glutamate release leading to an activation of the fronto-cortical glutamate receptor." This agonism is also linked to the psychedelic effect.

In early studies exploring the effects of LSD on alcohol-use disorders, results showed that there could be a beneficial effect in treating alcohol-related addictions. More recent research has shown that mice given ayahuasca were prevented from being alcohol dependent because of the treatment. Also, another study showed significant decreases in the use of alcohol by alcoholics when they were treated with psilocybin. In a similar study, 80% of tobacco-addicted participants given psilocybin reported tobacco abstinence after only six months. Although these promising findings suggest that some psychedelics may have anti-addictive features, more research is clearly needed, especially because not everyone responds to their effects.

== Modalities of care ==
The modality or level of care needed for a patient is decided by the treating professional in conjunction with the patient when feasible. As expected, the patient receiving treatment will likely make progress and have lapses, thus the level of care will likely have to fluctuate accordingly. Common modalities are explained below.

For people who are in search of help, their first stop should to be a rehabilitation center. There, a group of LCDC (licensed chemical dependency councilors) will assist them to identify the root cause of their addiction. They will then be placed on a path that is best for their recovery.

=== Detoxification and medically managed withdrawal ===
The process when the body rids itself of drugs is referred to as detoxification, and is usually concurrent with the side effects of withdrawal, which vary depending on the substance(s); and are often unpleasant and even fatal. Physicians may prescribe a medication that will help decrease the withdrawal symptoms, while the addict is receiving care in an inpatient or outpatient setting. Detoxification is generally considered a precursor to or a first stage of treatment because it is designed to manage the acute and potentially dangerous physiological effects of stopping drug use.

=== Long-term residential ===
Treatment is structured and operates 24 hours a day. Residents will remain in treatment from usually 6 to 12 months while developing accountability, responsibility and socialization skills. Activities are designed to help addicts recover from destructive behavior patterns, while adopting positive behavioral patterns. Constructive methods of interacting with others and improving self-esteem are other areas of focus. The therapeutic community model is an example of one treatment approach. Many therapeutic communities provide a more comprehensive approach to include employment training and other support services.

=== Short-term residential ===
Short-term residential programs are on average 3–6 weeks in a residential setting. The program is intensive, followed by more extended outpatient treatment to include individual and/or group therapy, 12-step Anonymous programs, or other forms of support. Because of the short duration of this modality, it is even more important for individuals to remain active in outpatient treatment programs to help decrease the risk of relapse following residential treatment.

=== Outpatient-treatment programs ===
Outpatient treatment programs vary regarding the services offered and the intensity. It's more affordable and may be more suitable for patients who are employed full-time and/or who have secured multiple social supports. Outpatient programs may include group and/or individual therapy, intensive outpatient programs, and partial hospitalization. Some outpatient programs are also designed to treat patients with medical or other mental health problems in addition to their drug disorders. Any kind of substance abuse eventually starts affecting multiple parts of the brain, thus leading to many mental health issues: paranoia, depression, anxiety, aggression, hallucinations, etc. These programs offer similar treatments and care as inpatient facilities. The difference is, with this kind of program, the patients are still allowed to live at home during their recovery process. While working and/or caring for their families, they must attend scheduled treatment sessions through the program throughout the week. There is a downside to this type of program, and that is a greater risk of relapse. Unlike inpatient facilities where there are no distractions of everyday life, these patients will struggle with possible encounters of triggers that challenge their sobriety. Therefore, outpatient programs are recommended to patients who are at a mild stage of addiction and have the right mindset to wanting to reach recovery.

=== Inpatient rehabs ===
Inpatient rehabs are substance-free facilities in which patients reside during their recovery process without the distractions of everyday life. Patients are required to check themselves in to overcome their addiction. These facilities are designed to focus on all aspects of each patients' addiction. Inpatient rehabs give 24/7 medical care as well as emotional support from psychologists, counselors, and psychiatrists. The first step of treatment is medically-assisted detoxification, where the patient's vital signs are monitored while the drug(s) exit the system. The patient can be given necessary medicine to reduce cravings and withdrawals. These programs vary in length, running anywhere from 28 days to 6 months.

=== Individualized drug counseling ===
Individualized drug counseling not only focuses on reducing or stopping illicit drug or alcohol use; it also addresses related areas of impaired functioning such as employment status, illegal activity, and family/social relations as well as the content and structure of the patient's recovery program. Through its emphasis on short-term behavioral goals, individualized counseling helps the patient develop coping strategies and tools to abstain from drug use and maintain abstinence. The addiction counselor encourages 12-step participation (at least one or two times per week) and makes referrals for needed supplemental medical, psychiatric, employment, and other services.

=== Group counseling ===
An outpatient treatment option facilitated by a treatment provider and used to expand on the support system the patient already has. Groups attempt to foster a non-judgmental environment allowing patients to meet and discuss difficulties and successes of their addiction while providing ongoing support that is needed to be successful with recovery. This kind of group counseling can be done for people with addictions in prison as well. It is done with a goal to give patients a sense of community that could better treatment outcomes.

=== Intensive outpatient program (IOP) ===
As the name implies this is an outpatient treatment option designed for addicts who for various reasons do not have the opportunity to attend an inpatient treatment program, yet who otherwise would not be able to receive the level of support needed to recover from their addiction. Programs vary in duration based on the patients need; because of the lower level of support offered, IOP is frequently used as a step down approach from patients leaving inpatient treatment but who are still in need of intensive therapy.

=== Peer recovery coaching ===
Peer Recovery Coaching are professionally trained and certified addiction recovery coaches that have lived experiences with substance abuse. Recovery coaches work individually with the patients and serve as a guide to develop a personalized treatment plan, connect clients to other types of care if needed, create a sober support network, and use their own experiences to help clients adjust to living a sober life. While lesser known, studies have shown recovery coaching to play an important role in the addiction field for both clients and primary care physicians.

== Prevention, relapse, and recovery ==
=== Therapeutic orientations and approaches ===
In 1878, the Index Medicus published research conducted and written by American physician W.H. Bentley. Bentley's research described his success in treating patients addicted to the "opium habit" with cocaine. Two years later he reported success in treating both opium and alcohol abusers with cocaine. Today, the swapping one addiction for another is referred to as crossover addiction.

A variety of treatment approaches are utilized by health professionals in order to provide their clients the highest possible level of success to overcome their addictions. There is no one specific approach and often therapists will use multiple techniques.

- Behaviorism.
- Humanistic Therapy.
- Cognitive Behavioral Therapy (CBT).
- Dialectical Behavioral Therapy (DBT).
- Psychodynamic.
- Expressive.
- Integrative.
- Harm Reduction.
- Eclectic.
- Animal Assisted Therapy.

=== Relapse ===
Relapse occurs when an addict is in the abstinence phase of their addiction, which is the phase in which one abstains from what they are addicted to, but then returns to their substance abuse. Even after having treatment, it is very common for addicts to relapse. Very few people manage to maintain sobriety without experiencing a relapse; it is not common for one to sustain perfect sobriety on their first attempt of abstinence. However, those who experience relapse find that it can be upsetting. Because of this, it is important to understand what triggers one's relapse. Some common triggers include "working, having money available, using other drugs, hearing certain songs, isolation, being around other drug-using friends, and even particular days of the week." Some other risk factors that may cause one to be more vulnerable to relapse include an unhealthy relationship, anxiety, depression, abuse of any kind, and other forms of trauma. Triggers and other risk factors often accompany the intense physical cravings one may experience when trying to recover from an addiction, so it is important to understand what these triggers and risks are for a specific individual.

Addiction recovery is a long process and relapse is likely to occur during this process. Relapse can occur at any time during the recovery process, so recognizing the warning signs of relapse is important. Some of these warning signs in the recovering individual may include increased use of other drugs (eg. nicotine or caffeine), isolation, feelings of depression, skipping recovery support activities, disturbed sleep, increased compulsive behaviors, avoidance when confronted, and idealized thoughts about their addiction and its associated consequences. If any of these warning signs are identified, intervening with the individual may be necessary to ensure continued improvement.

Because drug addiction is considered to be a chronic illness, professionals consider it to have no cure, especially because many addicts experience relapse. Despite this, drug addiction can be treated.

The attitude of the therapist is an important factor in enabling sustained recovery. While not downplaying the dangers of relapse, the therapist must "show empathy, concern, and a positive problem-solving attitude that reframes relapses as avoidable mistakes, not tragic failures. A genuine belief that patients can learn from these mistakes and move forward in their recovery, must be communicated unequivocally." A guide for Preventing Relapse is available online.

== See also ==
- Addiction-related structural neuroplasticity
- Addiction vulnerability
- Addiction by Design
