= Charles P. O'Brien =

American research scientist, medical educator (born 1939)

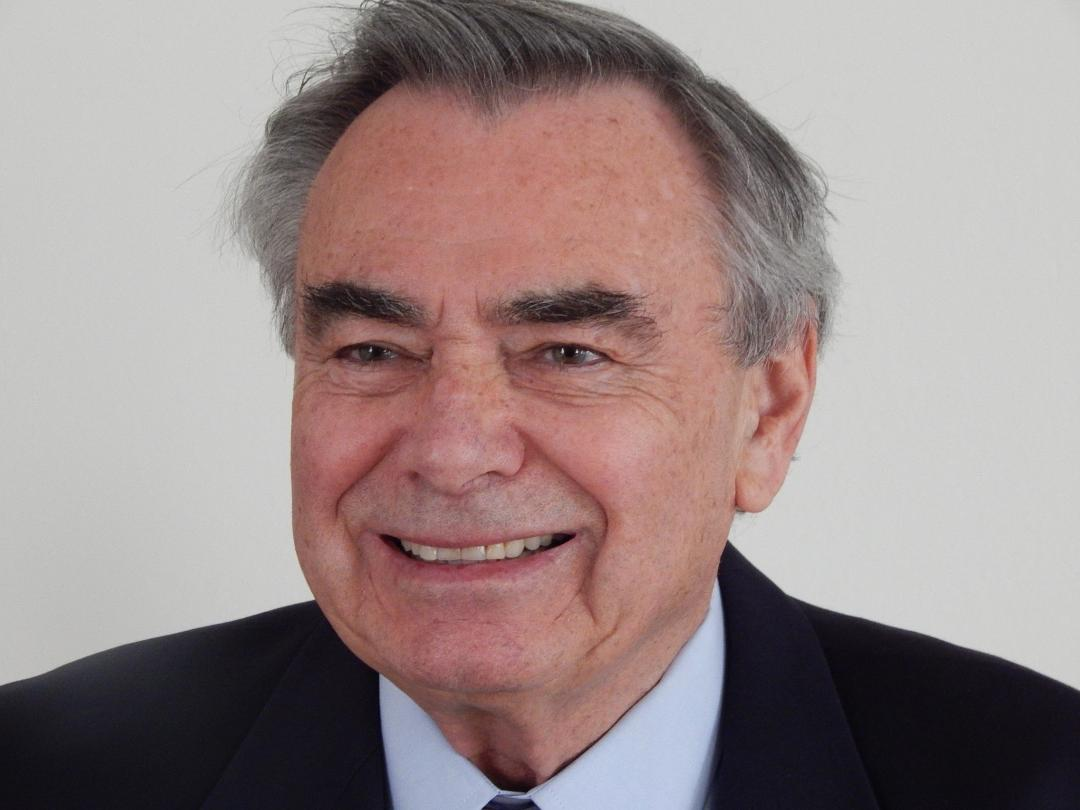
- Born: August 20, 1939 (age 87); New Orleans, Louisiana, United States
- Education: Tulane University
- Awards: Knight Chevalier of the Legion of Honor (2013)
- Scientific career
- Fields: Psychiatry, neurology
- Workplaces: Perelman School of Medicine at the University of Pennsylvania; Veterans Administration Medical Center in Philadelphia; Center for Studies of Addiction at the University of Pennsylvania

Charles P. O'Brien (born August 20, 1939, New Orleans, Louisiana) is a research scientist, medical educator and a leading expert in the science and treatment of addiction. He is board certified in neurology, psychiatry and addiction psychiatry. He is currently the Kenneth E. Appel Professor of Psychiatry, and vice chair of psychiatry, in the Perelman School of Medicine at the University of Pennsylvania.

== Career ==
O'Brien earned MD and PhD degrees from Tulane University in 1964 and 1966, respectively, and received residency training in internal medicine, neurology and psychiatry at Harvard University, Tulane, the University of London, and the University of Pennsylvania.

While serving as chief of psychiatry at the Veterans Administration (VA) Medical Center in Philadelphia, In 1971 O'Brien founded and became director of a clinical research program consisting of a group of VA and University of Pennsylvania scientists. From 1971 until 2013, he served as director of this research center, called the Center for Studies of Addiction at the University of Pennsylvania. He and the center's other researchers made many discoveries about the treatment of addictive disorders, and published their research findings in more than 500 research papers, all authored or co-authored by O'Brien, and published in peer-reviewed scientific journals. O'Brien and his colleagues at the Center for Studies of Addiction received personal praise, for their innovative research and results in helping patients recover from drug addiction, from U.S. President George H.W. Bush during a September 1991 tour of the center.

In addition to conducting scientific research, O'Brien also has advised U.S. government authorities on policies affecting the availability of drugs, including alcohol and tobacco, as well as on government's proper role in preventing and treating addictive disorders. He has also provided policy advice about drugs and addiction to many other countries, especially France.

In the US, O'Brien has chaired or served as a member of many Institute of Medicine committees dealing with science and drug abuse policy matters. From 2007 to 2013, he served as chairperson of the Substance Use Disorders Committee of the American Psychiatric Association. The purpose of this committee was to revise the primary classification system, known as DSM-5, that psychiatrists use in diagnosing mental illnesses, including addiction disorders.

There was no validated measure of addiction in the 1970s, so O'Brien began work, together with A. Thomas McLellan, PhD, to develop the "Addiction Severity Index", a tool that was later translated into over 30 languages and which by 2012 was being used throughout the world to determine the extent of patients' problems and tailor appropriate treatment approaches.

Naltrexone, an opioid receptor antagonist, was already in use by the early 1980s as a medication for treating addiction to heroin and other opioids, but not alcohol addiction. Based on animal studies, O'Brien in the 1980s theorized that alcohol produced pleasure by releasing endorphins – the brain's naturally occurring opioids. Accordingly, blocking endorphin receptors might help alcoholics resist drinking. In 1983, the Food and Drug Administration (FDA) granted permission to test this theory on patients. With funding provided by the U.S. Veterans Administration Substance Abuse Center in Philadelphia, O'Brien and one of his students, fellow University of Pennsylvania psychiatrist Joseph Volpicelli, and others conducted a study in which all addiction patients received counseling, but half of them also received naltrexone, while the other half received a placebo. During three months of treatment, those receiving naltrexone had fewer relapses to heavy drinking and reported less craving and less pleasure when they did drink. Working from these observations, O'Brien and his colleagues discovered a new treatment for alcoholism using naltrexone. In 1995, the FDA approved naltrexone for the treatment of alcohol dependence, ushering in a new era of alcoholism treatment which, prior to this time, had been limited mainly to psychotherapy and psychosocial interventions such as Alcoholics Anonymous.

In later studies, O'Brien and his colleagues noticed that naltrexone seemed to work effectively on only a subset of alcohol-addicted patients. The researchers began investigating why some alcoholics respond well to naltrexone while others do not. Their work led to the discovery of genes that determine the extent of pleasure one feels when drinking alcohol. Individuals with a particular genetic variant have a sensitive endogenous opioid system that is activated by alcohol, thereby producing stimulation and euphoria. naltrexone blocks this form of alcohol reward, so the medication is particularly effective for these individuals. Aimed at establishing a genomic sub-category of alcoholism, this work seemed to support the movement toward "personalized medicine" in the treatment of alcoholism. O'Brien and his colleagues never applied for a patent on the discovery of naltrexone's effectiveness for treating alcohol addiction, so this treatment continues to be used at no cost worldwide.

He has served as president of both the American College of Neuropsychopharmacology and the Association for Research in Nervous and Mental Disease.

== Awards and honors ==
- elected to the Institute of Medicine of the National Academy of Sciences in 1991
- an honorary doctorate by the University of Bordeaux in 1994, where he continued for many years to be a visiting professor
- the American Psychiatric Association Research Award in 2000
- the Nathan B. Eddy Award for research on addiction from the College on Problems of Drug Dependence in 2003
- the Sacher Award in Biological Psychiatry from the Columbia University College of Physicians and Surgeons in 2005
- the Paul Hoch Distinguished Service Award from the American College of Neuropsychopharmacology in 2009
- the gold medal for Research from the Society on Biological Psychiatry in 2010
- the Sarnat Prize for Mental Health from the Institute of Medicine of the National Academy of Science in 2010
- the John P. McGovern Award for Excellence in Research and Medical Education in Substance Abuse from the Association for Medical Education and Research in Substance Abuse in 2010
- the Jellinek International Award for Alcoholism Research in 2012
- the James B. Isaacson Award from the International Society for Biomedical Research on Alcoholism in 2012
- the medal of Knight Chevalier of the Legion of Honor of the Republic of France in October 2013, for achievements in the science of addiction and for contributions to French-American research collaborations
- the 2015 Lifetime Science Award from National Institute on Drug Abuse
