= Help at Any Cost =

Book by Maia Szalavitz

- Book cover
- Author: Maia Szalavitz
- Language: English
- Subject: Tough love, Behaviorism
- Genre: Non-fiction, Psychology
- Publisher: Riverhead Books
- Publication date: February 16, 2006
- Publication place: United States
- Media type: Hardback
- Pages: 336
- ISBN: 1-59448-910-6
- OCLC: 61169844
- Dewey Decimal: 362.74/8/0830973 22
- LC Class: HV1431 .S97 2006

Help at Any Cost: How the Troubled-Teen Industry Cons Parents and Hurts Kids is a non-fiction book by Maia Szalavitz analyzing the controversy surrounding the troubled teen industry. The book was published February 16, 2006, by Riverhead Books. Szalavitz focuses on four programs: Straight, Incorporated, a copy of the Straight Inc. program called KIDS, North Star wilderness boot camp, and the World Wide Association of Specialty Programs and Schools. She discusses the background, history and methodology of the troubled-teen industry, including techniques drawn from attack therapy and Synanon. She uses first-person accounts and court testimony in her research, and states that no evidence exists proving that these programs are effective. The book also includes advice for parents and an appendix with additional resources on how to get responsible help for teenagers.

The book received positive reviews in academic journals, literary journals, and in the media. Psychologist Steve K. D. Eichel reviewed the book for Cultic Studies Review and called it a "must read", psychologist and psychiatrist Robert John McAllister described it as "an excellent and informative book on the subject of the 'troubled-teen industry' " in his book Emotions: Mystery Or Madness, and a review in Psychology Today described Szalavitz's work as "a meticulously reported and thoughtful investigation". The book also received positive reviews in Publishers Weekly, Booklist, and Newsday. The book later led to an investigation into the troubled-teen industry by the United States House Committee on Education and Labor of the United States House of Representatives, and Representative George Miller held hearings on the matter in October 2007 and April 2008.

== Background ==
Teenagers have been participating in tough love behavior modification programs by force or coercion since the 1960s. Many of these programs take place in the wilderness in the style of military recruit training (also known as boot camps) and the teenagers are subjected to rigid discipline, including mandatory marches, physical abuse, solitary confinement, and deprivation of food and sleep. These programs have little to no oversight from the United States federal or state governments. Teenagers' claims of abuse at these facilities have not been investigated because the programs are not regulated.

== Author ==
Maia Szalavitz is a senior fellow at the Statistical Assessment Service (stats.org), a media watchdog organization which monitors news coverage of statistics and science. She has served as a researcher for journalist Bill Moyers, a part-time contributor to Psychology Today, and has written articles for The New York Times, The Washington Post, Reason, and The American Prospect. Szalavitz is the co-author of Recovery Options: The Complete Guide with Joseph Volpicelli, and The Boy Who Was Raised as a Dog with Bruce D. Perry.

== Contents ==
In Help at Any Cost Szalavitz investigates the teen rehabilitation industry and focuses on four programs: Straight, Incorporated, a copy of the Straight Inc. program called KIDS of Bergen County, North Star wilderness boot camp, and the World Wide Association of Specialty Programs and Schools. Some of these programs cost parents over US$2,000 per month. She discusses the history of the troubled-teen industry and its origins in a controversial group founded in 1958 called Synanon. Synanon claimed that it could cure addiction to heroin, and its methodologies such as attack therapy, forced confessions, and imposed powerlessness spread throughout the United States. After a rattlesnake was placed in the mailbox of an attorney suing Synanon, the group's founder was convicted of conspiracy to commit murder. Synanon later went bankrupt, but Szalavitz maintains that it influenced organizations related to the troubled-teen industry.

Szalavitz notes that according to a 2004 statement released by the National Institutes of Health, teen programs using "fear and tough treatment" are not successful and evidence shows that they can worsen existing behavioral problems. Many of the children that enter these programs have mental illness, and have a history of prior trauma and abuse. Szalavitz uses first-person accounts from teenagers that participated in these programs, and asserts that the programs have potentially serious negative consequences, including post-traumatic stress and deaths.

An emotional story in the book recounts the death of 16-year-old Aaron Bacon. Bacon had a treatable ulcer, and died after being out in the wilderness in Utah for weeks while in the care of the group North Star. Bacon lost 23 pounds (10 kg) in 20 days, but was called "gay" and a "faker" when he complained of abdominal pain, and was punished by North Star supervisors—his sleeping bag and food were taken away from him. The individuals responsible for Bacon were charged with negligent homicide, but did not serve any jail time.

In addition to these first-person accounts, she also incorporates court reports and testimony in her research. Szalavitz highlights controversial practices used by these tough love teen industry programs which the Geneva Convention banned as being too extreme for prisoners of war. She states that there is no evidence that any of the programs are effective. Portions of the book are addressed to parents and provide resources and advice on how to select better choices instead of programs in the tough love teen industry, and the book includes an appendix aimed at educating parents on how to find help for their teenagers.

== Reception ==
In his book Emotions: Mystery or Madness, psychologist and psychiatrist Robert John McAllister highly recommended Help at Any Cost, and called it "an excellent and informative book on the subject of the 'troubled-teen industry' ", and "important reading for any parent who is considering sending a teenager to a tough love program, a boot camp, or a wilderness program." In a review of the book in Library Journal, Linda Beck commented: "This book is excellent owing to its whistle-blowing approach: it exposes an unregulated industry and alerts adults to the severe harm inflicted by these 'schools.' " She called the book "chilling" and "Highly recommended for public libraries."

In a review in Mother Jones, Nell Bernstein highlighted the sources given for parents at the back of the book, commenting: "Help at Any Cost winds up with an appendix that helpfully outlines "evidence based" alternatives to the tough-love approach." Steve Weinberg of the St. Louis Post-Dispatch gave the book a positive review, and described Szavalitz as "a talented, relentless investigator". He noted: "Her outrage surfaces frequently as children die, as once-loving families are atomized and as troubled-teen entrepreneurs escape criminal prosecution while using legal maneuvers to prevail in civil court lawsuits seeking damages", and characterized Help at Any Cost as "an important book about an industry that sometimes helps troubled youth but causes harm way too often."

A review in Psychology Today called the book "An alarming exposé of the burgeoning business of boot camps and drug rehab centers that promise to reform troubled teens", and described Szalavitz's work as "a meticulously reported and thoughtful investigation". Vanessa Bush of Booklist characterized the book as "a revealing, at times horrifying look at the troubled-teen industry." Publishers Weekly noted: "With a useful appendix discussing when and how to get responsible help for a troubled teen, this book, filled with first-person accounts, should be required reading in Parenting 101", calling the work "a courageous—if horrifying—study of the tough-love industry".

Karen Karbo, author of The Stuff of Life, gave the book a positive review in Newsday, writing: "Maia Szalavitz's brisk investigation of America's so-called 'tough love' treatment programs, which bill themselves as the last hope for out-of-control, drug-taking teens, would be the stuff of a bad TV movie, if it weren't so smart, well-researched and even-handed." Mark Sauer of The San Diego Union-Tribune noted: "Some of the stories reveal physical and psychological abuse that rivals tales from Iraq's Abu Ghraib Prison."

== Aftermath ==
Help at Any Cost succeeded in bringing attention to deaths related to medical neglect and child abuse in the troubled-teen industry. On October 10, 2007, the United States House Committee on Education and Labor of the United States House of Representatives held a full committee investigative hearing chaired by Representative George Miller on "Cases of Child Neglect and Abuse at Private Residential Treatment Facilities". The Government Accountability Office presented findings from an investigation into the troubled-teen industry, and parents of teens who died under care of these organizations testified at the hearing. Maia Szalavitz attended the hearing as well.

After the book's publication, Szalavitz continued to write about the controversy surrounding the troubled-teen industry for Statistical Assessment Service, The New York Times, The Washington Post, Reason, and The American Prospect. The House Committee on Education and Labor held additional hearings on the matter on April 24, 2008, again chaired by Representative George Miller.
