= Transitional living =

Transitional living refers to any type of living situation that is transitional. The primary purpose or mission of transitional living environments is temporary. Transitional living facilities often offer low-cost housing. Transitional living residents that cater to those recovering from economic hardship often graduate from a shelter to a lesser crowded living situation. Transitional living may or may not have other common threads among residents. Transitional living provides professional support, education, and a stable living environment. Common types of transitional living include transitioning from jail or prison, an addiction treatment center or a mental health facility. They may also target homelessness, especially among youth. Transitional living is provided by many well known private and non-profit organizations, by government, churches and other charitable organizations.

== Transitional living for drug and alcohol rehabilitation ==
Transitional living that caters to people recovering from addiction are often referred to as sober living, 3/4 houses or recovery residences. While traditionally, transitional living facilities were known to cater to people recently released from incarceration, this type of program is most often referred to as a halfway house. Transitional living facilities are now common for people coming out of thirty-day residential or inpatient treatment settings who need ongoing intensive therapy while being able to work part-time or begin or reintegrate back into school and living a life in recovery. There are many excellent transitional living programs where people with addictions and mental health issues can continue their long term recovery.

== Of British design ==
The most earnest beginning of transitional living began when in 1878 through the "holiness" teaching of William Booth and wife Catherine who began the Whitechapel Christian Mission in London's East End to help feed and house the poor. The mission was reorganized along military lines, with the preachers known as officers and Booth as the general. After this, the group became known as the Salvation Army.

== The U.S. transitional program ==
The birthing of the "half-way" house concept became popular during the United States Great Depression which began in 1929. With an enormous increase in the use of alcohol, and introduction of opiates from the Far East and Asiatic countries, society in general began to resent the presence of these "drunks" (as they called them) in public. This protest, along with the efforts of the women's suffrage, and like groups, sparked the prohibition by the Federal Government on any alcoholic production, distribution, use or sale. Oddly enough drug use was not a consideration, as a matter of fact it was a largely accepted social practice that permitted use of such drugs as opium and heroin. This "drunks protest" also caused the development of an unofficial industry of half-shod, shanty structures for the intoxicated (see drunkenness) that were given the name "flophouses" where the "proprietor" would charge inflated prices for use of squalor spaces or rooms to allow the renter to find sobriety. This extortion concept of "sobering-up" continued until post World War II.

== The A.A. influence ==
In 1934 a man known as Bill W.(William Griffith Wilson, 1895–1971), admitted himself to a hospital for help with his drinking problem. He then became associated with the Oxford Group and shortly after that met Dr. Bob Smith (doctor) (Robert Holbrook Smith, M.D, 1879–1950) who too was a member of the Oxford Group. Together they formed the organization known as Alcoholics Anonymous with its concepts set on the Spiritual matters and on scripture with basic program design from the Oxford Group. This program was designed to help the individual "admit" and "act" to their drinking problem. With group support and selection of an individual "Recovery Sponsor" one might come to sobriety. The two designed the A.A. Big Book to provide "standards" for recovery. Through it one can establish a path to walk on toward finding God and sobriety. The only major revision made to the original text is that the individual must come to an understanding of God, as they know Him, so as to develop the spiritual relationship and surrender to His will. Within the Big Book are personal stories and testimonies of a variety of personalities and social standings to show that the disease is not a respecter of persons, status, gender, or race/ethnicity.

Bill W. would bring "drunks" to his own home and help them sober up. Dr. Bob would use a strong spiritual approach through hospital admissions. The A.A."12 step program" was (and is) the standard for not only Alcohol recovery groups and meetings but it began to gain acceptance in the medical and mental health fields and today other addiction programs such as Narcotics Anonymous, Cocaine Anonymous, Overeaters Anonymous and many other groups have adopted the 12 Step approach. The standards established by the early AA members are still the foundation of many transitional living and other addiction recovery groups.

== Homeless youth ==
The Runaway and Homeless Youth Act provides a grant to the transitional living program, as well as the basic center program, for emergency shelter, and the street outreach program, which focuses on informing youth about resources and services. The program focuses on providing long-term stable living conditions to help youth prepare for independent lives.

== Progress not perfection ==
Going back to the post World War II era, the returning military personnel from Europe and Asia were faced with many problems and unemployment was one of the major issues. With social readjustment and dramatic technology changes many of the G.I.'s could not adjust and many found relief through alcohol consumption that lead to abuse. However, with the gratitude and appreciation of society for the service provided to protect the nation there was the development of a "different view" on alcoholism as many employers found their best workers had "drinking problems." The provisions for "employee care" increased, mainly through the manufacturing industry and union efforts, for better insurance coverage and medical care for the employees and their families.

The main thrust of today's transitional living found a firm footing in the late 1960s. The philosophy then was to have a "central" location that could provide adequate, safe, and supportive housing for, mainly, the alcoholic.

As the progression of illegal drug use in the 1980s increased many traditional houses that were designed for alcohol issues found that they were receiving more and more "dual use" (drug and alcohol) clients. As the medical community became more acutely aware of the problem the Government (both Local and Federal), especially the Department of Health and Human Services, saw that dramatic intervention and support had to be made.

In the early 1990s research and statistics started to be heavily utilized. The results found that if the transitional living programs would (or could) increase their base program to include social education information and skills, as well as recovery issues, that A.O.D. (Alcohol and/or Drug) relapse would be greatly reduced. Many of the larger facilities, mostly industry supported, revised their venue for recovery and they found that it indeed increased the productivity and reduced use and abuse of drugs and alcohol significantly along with a very significant “relapse” reduction. The business and social effects were markedly improved and major funders through grants and foundations recognized this more and more. As late as 1995 there were approximately 83% of the requesting transitional Houses granted funding from Private or Government grants and gifting.

With the advent of 9/11 and other natural and human disasters the philanthropic community has understandably re-directed most of their monies towards “human relief efforts” nationally and worldwide. This has had a very serious effect on a majority of not-for-profit Human Service organizations and has prompted the closing of thousands of smaller transitional living programs that were having a positive effect in their community. The "giving" void is not only apparent from the established grants and foundations community but from local governments, Christian churches, and the citizenry as a whole.

The societal outlook on transitional living programs has been, more recently, narrowed to the domestic issues such as women's or spousal abuse and children's abuse and neglect issues. This is primarily due to the “epidemic” use of “street drugs” ranging from “home laboratory” produced Crack Cocaine and Meth (Methamphetamine) to “date” and “cosmetic” drug use and the ill-gotten notion that there is "no hope" for those who use these drugs. It is true that these “new” manufactured drugs have a far more addictive rate than those of the “peace” era of the 1960s, but there should also be understanding that this should be a cause for more intense rehabilitation programs and the formation of better judicial applications through Drug Courts and legal diversion programs.

Progress not perfection means that, like disease, there will probably never be a cure for drug addiction, but like a disease, drug and alcohol addictions can be treated. The progress is with an individual's spiritual and recovery program and will bring perfection in endurance, stability, patience, understanding and most important, sobriety

== How a transitional living program works ==
There are two major categories of transitional living programs. One is the "shelter" concept that provides the basic needs for nutrition, comfort, and sleeping space that may also provide a Spiritual message or is regulated by specific founding organizational requirement that are “target” specific such as the homeless, this type of living program is usually a very short term stay. Another shelter concept provides all of the above with the addition of security and life skill helps such as a women's shelter that has in place specific provisions for issues concerning children, legal and protective services. These programs are usually very flexible on “stay” time as each case is treated independently. The Shelter concept is usually funded by outside sources and do not require the resident to pay a fee or charge for services offered. The second living category is “rehabilitation” centers that have a program policy and procedure for issues that are “specific” in nature (i.e. addiction recovery, diet and food issues, etc.). The Rehabilitation programs involve services that are established to meet the needs of the particular issues of the admission. Some social issues can fall on the fence line between a “shelter” need and a “rehabilitation” need (i.e. the example given in the case of battered women).

In essence most transitional living programs that range from battered women to addiction recovery have the same operational and development standards.

The majority of transitional living centers are self-supporting. In other words, they have no affiliation or obligation to outside sources other than the required reporting of financial and operational record maintenance to various government or grant giving organizations. With the self-support status the living center usually charges a nominal rent or fee (some are set on sliding fee scales, some are established with monthly rates and yet others find support finances for each particular individual) that will afford the applicant a safe, clean, secure environment with balanced meals and a specific "care plan" to help bridge learning and application towards their recovery that is geared for their purpose and program.

Most living centers, regardless of their specific service, have in their program areas that will help better support the person through their specific needs be it from recovery or protection. Some of these areas are educational advancement opportunities, job skills training opportunities, "life skills" workshops and classes, and specific classes or meeting that are directly associated to their issue. The weekly or monthly dollar value "rent" varies on venue, location, program purpose, design, intensity and provision, plus any professional involvement or assistance requirements. Transitional living stays or residency can vary from very short term to extended time stays (1–2 days to up to 2, and in some cases, 3 years). Obligatory financial issues such as rent, transportation, and personal care items are the responsibility of the individual resident even though several programs may provide all or part of the above through donation or designated grants funding.

A "resident" could mean an individual or family depending on the program design. This resident is self-admitted or via family/friends, referral (i.e. another transitional center), or court order. Most programs have admission requirements and an "entry" intake instrument. For example, an alcohol and/or drug living center may administer a "standards" tool known as the A.S.I. (Addiction Severity Index) that measures and presents domestic, addiction, and social understandings and personal "life" issues. The majority of living centers use their admissions intake information received from the client to aid them in the design of a "personal" or "individual" Care Plan for that particular client or family. The resident agrees to abide by the living standards of the living center, which is verified through a binding legal rental agreement or standard of acceptance agreement between the center and the individual.

Depending on availability of personnel, materials, and finances a transitional center may offer its residents gratis workshops in money management, child care, domestic skills such as cooking and housekeeping, job skills classes, self-advocacy, crises intervention, social skills and to provide social and cultural events.

Finally, the intent of the transitional living center is to provide a place where the person can re-establish their self-worth, re-discover their place in society, and find compassion and love through Spiritual discovery and a genuine understanding of personal relationships. The bulk of the centers try to maintain a "home" atmosphere where a family type relationship is developed between the residents, staff, and volunteers. The transitional living centers of today go far above and beyond the term "Half-Way" in proving that half-way is not good enough and "complete" is the goal to strive for.
