= JSAT =

JSAT may refer to:

- SKY Perfect JSAT Group, a communication satellite operator and digital TV broadcaster of Japan
- JSAT Corporation, a communications satellite operator company that was absorbed by SKY Perfect JSAT Group in 2008
- JSAT (satellite constellation), a satellite fleet formerly operated by JSAT Corporation and currently by SKY Perfect JSAT Group
- Journal of Substance Use and Addiction Treatment, a medical journal published by Elsevier
