= Joseph R. Volpicelli =

American psychiatrist

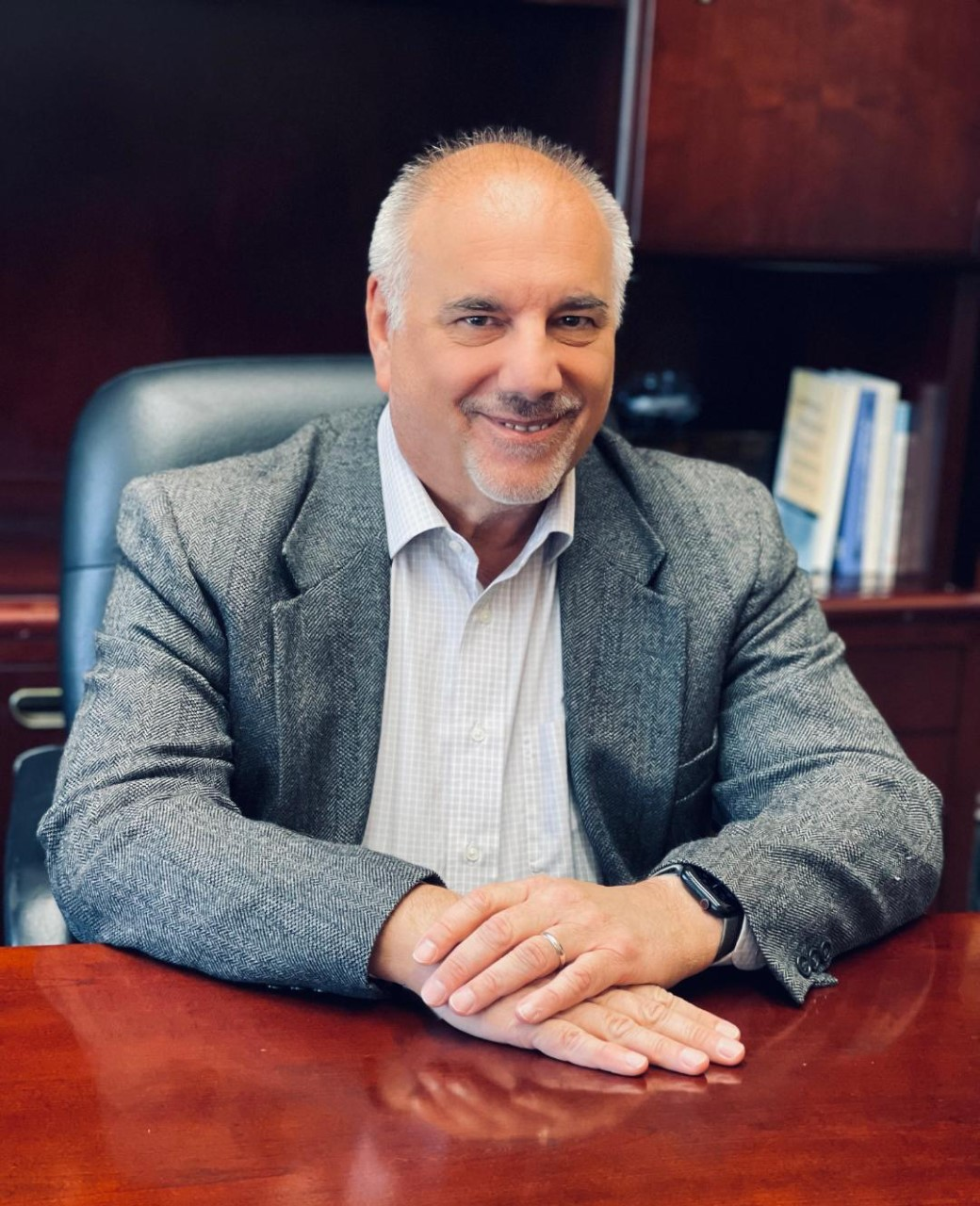
- Born: June 25, 1953 (age 73); Norristown, Pennsylvania
- Education: University of Pennsylvania
- Known for: First to show naltrexone was effective in treating alcohol use disorder
- Website: www.volpicellicenter.com www.instituteaddictionmedicine.org

Joseph R. Volpicelli (born June 25, 1953) is an American psychiatrist, research scientist, medical academic, and whose work has focused on the treatment of addictive disorders. He is professor emeritus, Perelman School of Medicine at the University of Pennsylvania. He is board certified in neurology, psychiatry and addiction psychiatry. He currently is medical director at Volpicelli Center, an out-patient addiction treatment facility in Plymouth Meeting, Pennsylvania, as well as the executive director at Institute of Addiction Medicine, a non-profit research entity also in Plymouth Meeting, Pennsylvania.

== Education ==
Volpicelli attended Dickinson College for his undergraduate education where he double majored in biology and psychology. He earned his MD and PhD degrees from Perelman School of Medicine at the University of Pennsylvania in 1981. Following this, he went on to complete a psychiatry residency at Hospital of the University of Pennsylvania from 1982 to 1985. In 1986, Volpicelli completed a fellowship program in neuropsychopharmacology, also at the University of Pennsylvania.

== Career ==
Volpicelli worked at the Perelman School of Medicine until 2008. Throughout his tenure, he served in several capacities including research scientist and associate professor for the department of psychiatry and psychology.

He studied topics including, but not limited to, the use of naltrexone within the context of PTSD, the relationship between stress and alcohol drinking, and most notably, the use of naltrexone to treat alcohol dependence.

During this time, he also designed a treatment modality called the BRENDA Approach. Each letter in the acronym BRENDA represents a step in the process. B(biopsychosocial evaluation), R(report findings to patient), E(empathize), N(what are the Needs of the patient), D(direct advice), A(assess patient's response to advice).

Additionally, he created clinical assessments such as the Penn Alcohol Craving Scale (PACS) to be used in research as well as clinical practice. The PACS assessment continues to be widely used today.

== Research on naltrexone ==
Based on his early experimental research with an animal model of alcohol drinking, he designed and conducted the first clinical trial of naltrexone in the treatment of alcohol dependence. With the support of his mentor, Charles P. O'Brien, and funding from the U.S. Veterans Administration Substance Abuse Center in Philadelphia, Volpicelli found that naltrexone significantly reduced alcohol relapse in recently detoxified alcohol-dependent subjects. While all subjects received alcohol addiction counseling, compared to the group that received placebo medication, the naltrexone-treated subjects reported significantly reduced alcohol craving and less high or euphoria associated with drinking alcohol on occasions when they drank alcohol.

This study was published in the Archives of General Psychiatry in 1992, by Volpicelli with his colleagues Al Alterman, Motoi Hayashida, and Charles P. O'Brien. Based on the results of this and another study conducted at Yale by Stephanie O'Mally, in 1994, the FDA approved the use of naltrexone to treat alcohol dependence; it was the first new medication to be FDA approved for this condition in nearly 50 years.

== Publications ==
As of May 2023, Volpicelli has authored two books and over 100 peer-reviewed research publications. In April 2000, Volpicelli's first book, Recovery Options: The Complete Guide, with Maia Szalavitz, was released. Later, March 2001, Volpicelli and co-authors Helen Pettinati, A. Thomas McLellan and Charles P. O'Brien released Combining Medication and Psychosocial Treatments for Addictions: The BRENDA Approach.

== Awards and honors ==
- 1972-74 Dana Scholarship
- 1975 Phi Beta Kappa
- 1977 Omicron Delta Kappa (Leadership and Scholarship)
- 1985 Committee on Problems of Drug Dependence Travel Fellowship Award
- 1989 First Independent Research Support and Transition (FIRST) Award
- 1992 Best Doctors in America - Philadelphia Magazine
- 1997 American Association for the Advancement of Science
- 1998 Joel Elkes International Award – American College of Neuropsychopharmacology
