= After Words =

American television series

- Genre: Talk show
- Country of origin: United States

Original release
- Network: C-SPAN2
- Release: January 2, 2005 – present

Related
- Booknotes

After Words is an American television series on the C-SPAN2 network's weekend programming schedule known as Book TV. The program is an hour-long talk show, each week featuring an interview with the author of a new nonfiction book. The program has no regular host. Instead, each author is paired with a guest host who is familiar with the author or the subject matter of their book.

The program airs on Saturday at 10 p.m. Eastern Time, with encores on Sunday at 12 p.m. and at 9 p.m., and Monday at 12 a.m.

== History ==
After Words debuted on January 2, 2005, with Norman J. Ornstein from the American Enterprise Institute interviewing Newt Gingrich about his book Winning the Future. As of December 2010, After Words has produced more than 260 hours of programming.

Noteworthy authors and guest hosts who have appeared on the program include: Jimmy Carter, interviewed by Douglas Brinkley; Bob Dole, interviewed by Rick Atkinson; Andrea Mitchell interviewed by Samuel Robert Lichter and Simon Schama interviewed by Edna Medford.

== Show format ==
The program is an hour-long author interview-based talk show, focusing on non-fiction writers, with different participants each week. On each program an author is interviewed about their book by a guest host who is an expert on the topic of the book. The goal of this format, as stated by C-SPAN, is to put a "different spin" on the usual format of author interview programs. After Words is now a weekly part of Book TV's schedule, along with History on Book TV, Book Parties and Festivals, Public Lives and Encore Booknotes.
