= Axiom of Cumulative Inertia =

Sociological phenomenon on human migratory patterns

The Axiom of Cumulative Inertia is a sociological phenomenon rooted in observations of human migratory patterns. Introduced in 1966 by Myers, McGinnis and Masnick, the most widely known form of the axiom is encapsulated by the statement:

"The probability of remaining in any state of nature increases as a strict monotone function of duration of prior residence in that state."

There is thus a clear negative correlation between the amount of time a person has lived in a certain location, and the likelihood they will move in future. Suggested reasons for this change include loss aversion (resulting from possible unknown problems in the further place of residence), financial stability linked to a certain place of employment or the presence of an extended social network in the form of familial and other obligations. The large number of factors which affect human migratory patterns make it difficult to assess the exact degree of impact of the various postulated variables, and debate also exists as to the appropriate relation between residence time and likelihood of moving.

Since it was first coined from human residence patterns, cumulative inertia has since been observed in a variety of other social behaviours. It has been used to model entry to and recovery from addiction, modern tribalism effects, and the rehabilitation chances of repeat offenders (recidivism). Identifying the role and strength of inertia in such behaviours can be critical in designing the appropriate treatment or intervention strategy, and is an important tool in identifying individuals or groups which are most likely to change behaviour.

In addition to being relevant in specific demographic targeting, such as members of a political party who are more likely to be swayed by different ideology, or individuals who pose a higher risk of relapsing into additive behaviours, cumulative inertia can also play an important role outside of political campaigns or public policy making. Geographical areas presenting strong cumulative inertia are indicative of attractive regions wherein property prices or demand is likely to rise. Cumulative inertia can thus also have a strong financial impact.

The study of cumulative inertia remains an active area of current research in complex systems or quantitative sociology.

== See also ==
- Human migration
- Addiction psychology
- Recidivism
