= Tough love =

Type of behavior modification

Tough love is the act of treating a person sternly or harshly with the intent to help them in the long run. People exhibit and act upon tough love when attempting to address someone else's undesirable behaviour. Tough love can be used in many scenarios such as when parenting, teaching, rehabilitating, self-improving or simply when making a decision. Tough love is usually seen as positive due to its encouragement of growth, boundaries, resilience and independence.

The phrase "tough love" itself is believed to have originated with Bill Milliken's book of the same title (Note: The book is: Milliken, B.; Meredith, C. (1968). Tough Love. Old Tappan, N.J.: F. H. Revell Co. OCLC 384094.) in 1968. (Note: The first use of the term in professional literature appears to be: Alcohol Highway-traffic Safety Workshop for the Judiciary. U.S. Government Printing Office. 1974. pp. II–76.) Milliken described tough love through the expression, "I don't care how this makes you feel toward me. You may hate my guts, but I love you, and I am doing this because I love you." Milliken aimed to teach parents how to support and guide problematic teens.

The American Psychological Association describes tough love as "the fostering of individuals' well-being by requiring them to act responsibly and to seek professional assistance for their behaviors." Others such as Tim Hawkes has described tough love as putting "principles before popularity" and allowing loved ones to learn through failure.

Milliken strongly emphasizes that a relationship of care and love is a prerequisite of tough love, and that it requires that caregivers communicate clearly their love to the subject. In relation to addiction, Maia Szalavitz believes, based on her own experience, that this may be difficult, since some people experiencing addiction consider themselves unworthy of love and find it difficult to believe others love them.

In most uses, there must be some actual love or feeling of affection behind the harsh or stern treatment to be defined as tough love. For example, genuinely concerned parents refusing to support their drug-addicted child financially until they enter drug rehabilitation would be said to be practicing tough love. Other examples of tough love include establishing clear boundaries, refusing to enable destructive behavior, providing honest feedback, allowing natural consequences and failure, encouraging independence and interventions, holding accountability, and lacking empathy.

== Theoretical framework ==
An ultimate, evolutionary explanation of tough love would state that tough love helps people adapt to challenging environments and helps them to better compete for resources due to an increase of independence. This is part of the parental investment theory that states parents want to maximise long-term wellbeing and success of their offspring, potentially through tough love.

From a humanistic approach, unconditional positive regard and empathy is key to self-actualising. In tough love, positive regard is conditional to a person's changed behaviour, therefore humanists may not fully agree with tough love. To support humanist's beliefs, it was found that greater parental conditional regard was significantly associated with contingent self-esteem and increased levels of depressive symptoms.

Attachment theory and developmental psychology would emphasise the necessity for love and nurture during early childhood for emotional security and well-being in adulthood. A study done on attachment styles and parenting styles found a positive correlation between a secure attachment and an authoritative style.

== Real world effects and research ==
Tough love has been found to improve collaboration performance in cross-organisational contexts in contrast to soft (nurturing) or hard (pressuring) approaches. It may also cause adolescents to grow with higher protective and fewer risk behaviours.

=== Parenting and cultures ===
Diana Baumrind found four parenting styles: authoritarian, permissive, authoritative and neglectful parenting styles. Studies have shown that an authoritative parenting style, the one that most closely demonstrates tough love, is characterised by warmth, responsiveness and clear boundaries, promoting positive child outcomes. Baumrind found that it promotes well-adjusted and independent children, and that fulfilling all of a child's needs with no limits imposed is negative. The British think tank Demos says that tough love is beneficial in the development of preferred character traits in children up to five years old.

Research have found positive effects of authoritative parenting on academic performances, however, there are cultural differences in parenting outcomes. It was found that Chinese mothers scored higher than European-American mothers in control and authoritarianism, but not in authoritativeness. Another study also found that although African-American parents exhibited high levels of authoritativeness, it did not yield the same positive results on academic achievements as other ethnic groups, potentially as African-American children are more influenced by peers. Chao's study revealed that Chinese parents tend to prioritise obedience and respect for authority. In contrast, European American parents typically value independence and self-expression, leading to more authoritative parenting styles that emphasise reasoning with children. In a study, authoritative parenting was associated with at least one positive child outcome and authoritarian parenting was associated with at least one negative outcome in all regions of the globe.

Overtime, studies have shown that the popularity of tough love is diminishing, there has been a decrease in directive control and a shift in parental roles, suggesting parenting styles such as gentle parenting are gaining popularity.

== Reception and ethical considerations ==
Although tough love was coined as being a positive method of changing behaviour, there are many criticisms surrounding it. Some say the term has been appropriated to justify authoritarian parenting, often seen as an extreme version of authoritative parenting and tough love.

=== Authoritarian parenting ===
Michelle Borba, author of No More Misbehavin': 38 Difficult Behaviours and How to Stop Them, asserts that tough love fails to recognise differences between children, failing to produce individual respect and therefore creating a power struggle. She emphasises the importance of individual boundaries and respect, stating tough love is a sign that "things in the parent-child relationship have gone south".

Baumrind observed authoritarian parenting and found an anecdotal association of parents high in control and demands and low in warmth with children that display increased aggression and low self-esteem. Other studies have found that parental involvement and monitoring are predictors of adolescent achievement, suggesting independence may not necessarily improve achievements. Furthermore, there is an increased risk of drinking, smoking, and using drugs for those growing up in a neglectful or authoritarian parenting style.

=== Punishment ===
When tough love becomes extreme, it may lead to punishments being used.

Physical punishment can sometimes be associated with tough love but is also very damaging to children, increasing child aggression, antisocial behaviour, lower intellectual achievements, and mental health problems. However, it was found that in normative cultures, physical punishment is less negative.

When looking at prison studies, they have also shown that after three months of imprisonment, risk taking increases and attention deteriorates. This shows that tough love may not be the best method of rehabilitation.

Tough love has also attempted to justify boot camps for teenagers which Maia Szalavitz characterizes as abusive. The American National Institutes of Health says that "get tough treatments do not work and there is some evidence that they may make the problem worse". Szalavitz believes 'tough love' encourages unnecessarily harsh rules, "brutal confrontations", and a presumption that pain produces growth.

=== Training ===
In coaching contexts, it has been found that coaches more open to the ideas of others were more effective and challenged players while being supportive in a positive climate compared to coaches that toughened up their players through harsh and tough love methods. It has also been shown that when training nurses, tough love behaviour deterred nurses from remaining in the health organisation and professions.

== See also ==
- Corporal punishment
- Tiger parenting
- Troubled teen industry

== General and cited references ==
- Hall, Douglas A.; Hall, Judy; Daman, Steve (2010). The cat and the toaster: Living system ministry in a technological age. Urban Voice. Wipf & Stock. ISBN 978-1-60899-270-6.
- Hawkes, Tim (2016). Ten Conversations You Must Have with Your Son: Preparing Your Son for a Happy and Successful Life. Penguin. ISBN 978-1-101-99225-8.
- Jung, J. H. (2015). The Concept of Care in Curriculum Studies: Juxtaposing Currere and Hakbeolism. Studies in Curriculum Theory Series. Taylor & Francis. ISBN 978-1-317-38462-5.
- Milliken, Bill (2007). The Last Dropout: Stop the Epidemic!. Hay House. ISBN 978-1-4019-1906-1.
- Miller, C. J. (2009). Repentance: A Daring Call to Real Surrender. CLC Publications. ISBN 978-1-936143-63-4.
- Szalavitz, Maia (2006). Help at any cost: How the troubled-teen industry cons parents and hurts kids. Riverhead. ISBN 978-1-59448-910-5.
