= Maia Szalavitz =

American reporter and author (born 1965)

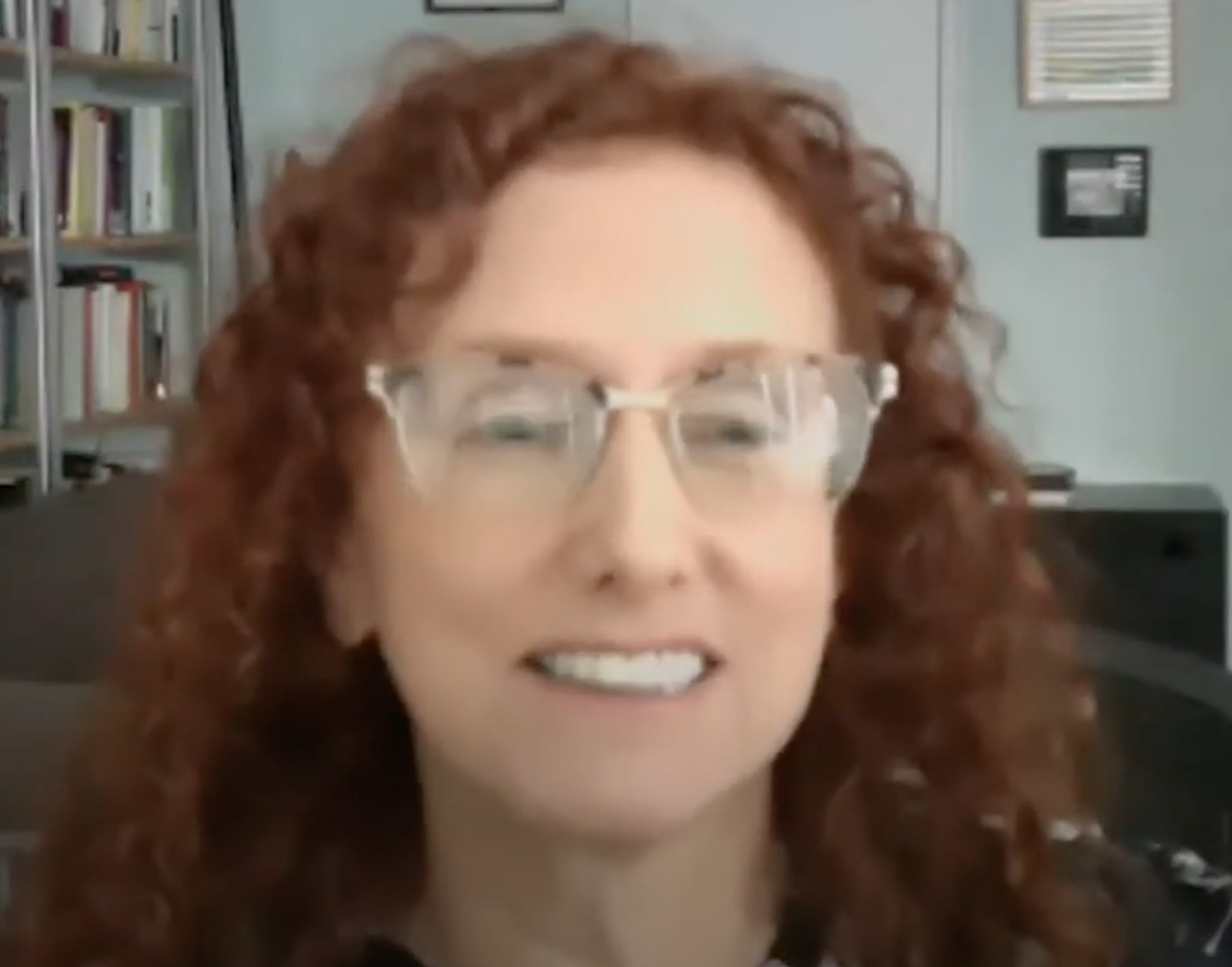
- Szalavitz in October 2020
- Born: March 29, 1965 (age 61); New York, NY, U.S.
- Citizenship: United States
- Education: Monroe-Woodbury High School; Columbia University; Brooklyn College
- Occupations: Writer, author
- Writing career
- Language: English
- Notable work: Help at Any Cost: How the Troubled-Teen Industry Cons Parents and Hurts Kids

Maia Pearl Szalavitz (born March 29, 1965) is an American reporter and author who focuses on science, public policy and addiction treatment.

== Early life and education ==
Maia Szalavitz was born March 29, 1965. She was raised in upstate New York. She graduated from Monroe-Woodbury High School in 1983 and attended Columbia University. She graduated cum laude from Brooklyn College.

Szalavitz was addicted to cocaine and heroin in her late teens and early twenties, an experience that has informed her writing on addiction.

== Career ==
Szalavitz is best known as the author of Help at Any Cost: How the Troubled-Teen Industry Cons Parents and Hurts Kids, a 2006 exposé documenting abuse in the insufficiently regulated troubled teen industry. She has written many other books including Born for Love: Why Empathy is Essential – and Endangered (Morrow, 2010) and The Boy Who Was Raised as a Dog (Basic, 2006), both coauthored with Dr. Bruce D. Perry; and co-authored Recovery Options: The Complete Guide with Dr. Joseph Volpicelli.

Paul Raeburn at Knight Science Journalism at MIT called her "the best writer I know of on addiction and related issues."

Szalavitz blogs for the Huffington Post and has written for the New York Times, the Washington Post, Newsday, New York magazine, New Scientist, Newsweek, Elle, Salon, Redbook and other major publications. She has also worked in television – first as Associate Producer and then Segment Producer for the PBS Charlie Rose Show, then on several documentaries including a Barbara Walters' AIDS special for ABC, and as Series Researcher and Associate Producer for the PBS documentary series Moyers on Addiction: Close to Home.

Szalavitz is an investigative reporter for Time magazine, and since 2004 has been a senior fellow at George Mason University's media watchdog group Statistical Assessment Service.

In 2009, Szalavitz partnered with Brent W. Jeffs and released Lost Boy, a biography of Jeffs's life in the Fundamentalist Church of Jesus Christ of Latter Day Saints.

In March 2016, her book Unbroken Brain: A Revolutionary New Way of Understanding Addiction was published by St. Martin's Press. Szalavitz was a 2015 Soros Media fellow, which supported her in writing this book.

In 2021 she published a history of the harm reduction movement, Undoing Drugs : the Untold Story of Harm Reduction and the Future of Addiction.

== Awards and honors ==
She has been awarded the American Psychological Association's Division 50 Award for Contributions to the Addictions, the Media Award from the American College of Neuropsychopharmacology and the Drug Policy Alliance's 2005 Edward M. Brecher Award for Achievement.

== Books ==
- With Joseph Volpicelli. Recovery Options: The Complete Guide. Wiley, New York, 2000.
- Help at Any Cost: How the Troubled-Teen Industry Cons Parents and Hurts Kids. Riverhead, New York, 2006.
- With Bruce D. Perry. The Boy Who Was Raised As a Dog: and Other Stories From a Child Psychiatrist's Notebook. BasicBooks, New York, 2007.
- With Bruce D. Perry. Born for Love: Why empathy is essential -- and endangered. William Morrow, New York, 2011.
- With Brent W. Jeffs. Lost Boy. Broadway Books, New York, 2009.
- Unbroken Brain : A Revolutionary New Way of Understanding Addiction. St. Martin's Press, New York, 2016
- Undoing Drugs : the Untold Story of Harm Reduction and the Future of Addiction. Hachette Go, New York, 2021.
