= Addiction by Design =

2014 Non-fiction book about gambling

Addiction by Design: Machine Gambling in Las Vegas
- First edition
- Author: Natasha Dow Schüll
- Language: English
- Subject: Problem gambling
- Genre: Non-fiction
- Publisher: Princeton University Press
- Publication date: May 11, 2014 [paperback]
- Publication place: United States
- ISBN: 0691160880

Addiction by Design: Machine Gambling in Las Vegas is a 2012 non-fiction book by Natasha Dow Schüll and published by Princeton University Press that describes machine gambling in Las Vegas. It offers an analysis of machine gambling and the intensified forms of consumption that computer-based technologies enable and the innovations that deliberately enhance and sustain the 'zone' which extreme machine gamblers yearn for.

The book received attention in connection with how current information technologies, in certain contexts, can make people addicted.

== See also ==
- Addiction psychology
- Slot machine
- Compulsion loop
