= Arnold M. Washton =

American psychologist and author known for his work in addiction psychology

Dr. Arnold M. Washton
- Education: Graduate School and University Center of the City University of New York (Ph.D.)
- Occupations: Psychologist, Author, Researcher, Clinical Professor
- Known for: Contributions to addiction psychology and the treatment of addictive disorders
- Notable work: "Treating Alcohol and Drug Problems in Psychotherapy Practice: Doing What Works"
- Website: https://recoveryoptions.us/

Arnold M. Washton is an American psychologist, author, researcher, and educator working in the field of addiction psychology since 1975. He has written several textbooks for graduate students and practitioners, self-help manuals published by the Hazelden Foundation, and over 30 articles in professional refereed journals. His work has influenced national policy and the development of best practices in addiction treatment. He continues to provide professional training seminars approved by the American Psychological Association and sponsored by academic institutions, including the Graduate School of Applied and Professional Psychology at Rutgers University.

== Education ==
A native of New York City, born and raised in The Bronx, Washton began his education in psychology at New York University where he earned a B.A. degree in 1968, followed by an M.A. from Queens College, City University of New York 1973 and a Ph.D. in psychology from the Graduate School and University Center of the City University of New York in 1978.

== Career ==
Starting in the early 1980s, he brought to public attention the emerging epidemic of cocaine use in the United States and spearheaded an effort to formally recognize cocaine “addiction” as a phenomenon worthy of medical classification. This challenged the long-held but mistaken belief that cocaine was not truly “addictive” because abrupt discontinuation of cocaine use did not give rise to definitive withdrawal syndrome as is the case with heroin and other opioids. Washton's work has also contributed to a greater understanding of the role of medication assisted treatment for addiction, including the clinical value of opioid antagonists such as naltrexone and naloxone. Washton has developed specialized approaches for treating addiction in high-functioning individuals including corporate executives, physicians, and other healthcare professionals. He has promoted evidence-based treatment protocol for substance abuse, including marijuana abuse, and has published on protocols for outpatient treatment of substance abuse.

He has been quoted in the press as a commentator on addiction issues, especially on topics related to challenges faced by professionals struggling with alcohol and other drug problems.

=== Clinical work ===
In 1998, Washton founded Recovery Options, a private practice in New York City. With his wife, Loraine Washton, he formed The Washton Group in Princeton, New Jersey, offering a range of online telehealth addiction and mental health services. The Washton Group specializes in the treatment of executives, professionals, and their families. Treatment incorporates group and individual therapy to support diverse substance use goals, including abstinence, harm reduction, and alcohol moderation. In clinical practice, and in publications, he advances the thesis that "willpower" should not be viewed as a necessary and sufficient condition for recovery.

=== Academic positions ===
In addition to his clinical practice, Washton provides professional training and continuing education webinars approved by the American Psychological Association many of which are sponsored by Rutgers University Graduate School of Applied and Professional Psychology.

=== Public service and policy advocacy ===
Washton has served on the Substance Abuse Advisory Committee of the U.S. Food and Drug Administration and the American Psychological Association and has provided expert testimony on drug abuse trends in America to both the United States Senate and the House of Representatives.

== Publications ==
Washton has written ten textbooks published between 1987 and 2023, four monographs published by the Hazelden Foundation (Hazelden Betty Ford Foundation), and over 30 articles in refereed journals, including early investigation of the efficacy of Naltrexone. "Treating Alcohol and Drug Problems in Psychotherapy Practice: Doing What Works", co-authored with Joan Zweben, was published in 2006 and updated in 2023.

=== Selected publications ===
- Washton AM (Ed.). (1985). Psychotherapy and substance abuse: A practitioner's handbook. New York: Guilford.
- Washton, AM. (2008). Quitting cocaine: your personal recovery plan. Center City, Minneapolis: Hazelden.
- Washton, AM, Zweben, JZ. (2009) .Cocaine and methamphetamine addiction: treatment, recovery, and relapse prevention. New York: Norton Professional Books.
- Washton, AM, Zweben, J.E. (2nd Edition, 2023). Treating Alcohol Drug Problems in Psychotherapy Practice Doing What Works New York, Guilford.

== See also ==
- Addiction psychology
- Harm reduction
