= The Media Elite =

1986 book by Samuel Robert Lichter, Stanley Rothman, and Linda Lichter

- Author: S. Robert Lichter; Stanley Rothman; Linda S. Lichter
- Genre: Non-fiction
- Publication date: 1986
- ISBN: 978-0803893504

The Media Elite: America's New Powerbrokers is a non-fiction book written by S. Robert Lichter, Stanley Rothman, and Linda S. Lichter, published in 1986. It details a social scientific study of the ideological commitments of 'elite' journalists in the United States, and the consequences of those commitments on both the reporting itself and on its reception by the public. The book states that because of the political opinions of journalists, the elite media has a liberal media bias.

One of the stated aims of the books is to comprehend social changes in elite rule in the USA in continuation to the famous study of C W Mills, titled The Power Elites. The book progresses from the idea that few people of similar social backgrounds and family ties hold the command positions or key positions in the power structure. The Power Elites control top positions in the corporate, federal government, and military organisations. The Media Elite are emerging due to the expansion of national media networks and they are challenging the traditional elites of the American society.

== Research methodology ==
The book presents findings from a survey conducted in 1980, involving 238 journalists selected randomly from prominent news organizations in the United States. These organizations include ABC, CBS, NBC, PBS, Time, Newsweek, U.S. News & World Report, The New York Times, The Washington Post, and The Wall Street Journal. The study utilized content analysis and audience reception studies to examine potential discrepancies between the views of journalists and those of the general public. The aim was to investigate whether such disparities influenced news reporting and subsequently shaped public beliefs.

Critiques have been raised regarding certain aspects of the methodology employed in the study, prompting academic debate between the authors and their critics in academic journals. Critics have pointed out various purported issues with the methodology employed, including concerns about the sample size being relatively small, questions regarding the adequacy of randomization procedures, the absence of media owners, managers, or editors from the sample pool, potential biases in the formulation of survey questions, subjective classifications of viewpoints as conservative or liberal by the authors, insufficient measurement of public attitudes, and perceived shortcomings in the statistical analysis of the findings.

== Findings ==
The survey revealed a group of individuals at once remarkably similar to one another in the background, status, and beliefs and strikingly different from the general public. In 1980, this "media elite" was predominantly white (95 percent), male (79 percent), college-educated (93 percent), and well paid. Four out of five had been raised in relatively affluent business or professional families; two out of three came from states in the Northeast or industrial Midwest.

In terms of beliefs, one distinctive characteristic was a strongly secular outlook. In marked contrast to a 1977 Gallup poll of the general population in which 94 percent of respondents professed a religious faith, 50 percent of the elite journalists listed their religion as "none." And while 86 percent of respondents from the general population said their religious beliefs are very or fairly important to them (and 42 percent had attended a religious service in the preceding week), an identical 86 percent of elite journalists said they seldom or never go to church.

Concerning political beliefs: 54 percent of the journalists described their views as left of center, 29 percent as "middle of the road," and only 17 percent as right of center. The authors argue that this ratio of more than three liberal journalists for each conservative contrasts sharply with the distribution among the American public: every relevant poll conducted in the decade from 1975 to 1985 found conservatives outnumbering liberals in the electorate, often by a ratio of three to two or more.

Of course, partisan or ideological labels provide only a very rough indication of political orientation. Thus one of the great strengths of the Media Elite survey is that it also included several sets of more precise questions about political attitudes and behaviors. One set asked how the journalists had voted in each of the last four presidential elections (i.e., 1964–1976). It produced what is now probably the most frequently quoted datum in the media bias debate: Among elite journalists who voted for a major party candidate, support for the more liberal Democratic contender ranged from 81 percent for George McGovern and Jimmy Carter, to 87 percent for Hubert Humphrey, to a high of 94 percent for Lyndon B. Johnson.

An additional set of questions elicited attitudes on 21 economic, political, and social issues. The responses showed little support for egalitarian socialist economics but strong endorsement of liberal social views in such areas as welfare, affirmative action, environmentalism, and, in particular, individual morality. For example, only 13 percent of the journalists agreed that large private corporations should be nationalized, while 86 percent endorsed the statement that "people with more ability should earn higher salaries." Similarly, fully 90 percent agreed that "it is a woman's right to decide whether or not to have an abortion," while only 25 percent agreed that homosexual sex is "wrong." Fewer than half (47 percent) agreed that adultery is wrong.

The authors also sought to provide insight into the future by conducting a separate survey of students at Columbia University's Graduate School of Journalism, a principal training ground for prospective members of the media elite. They found that while the students were more diverse in race and gender than the existing elite they were even more homogeneous in background and beliefs. In particular, self-described liberals outnumbered conservatives 85 percent to 11 percent, a ratio of almost eight to one.

=== Nuclear power ===
One specific issue the authors examined was nuclear power. Energy scientists, energy engineers, nuclear scientists, and science journalists were all surveyed – only 24% of journalists favored rapid nuclear development, compared with 69% of nuclear scientists, 70% of energy scientists, and 80% of the energy engineers. The content analysis showed that the overall coverage of nuclear power issues tended to overwhelmingly favor the views of the journalists ("at six out of seven media outlets, anti-nuclear stories outnumbered pro-nuclear pieces by a wide margin”). An analysis of the opinions expressed by scientists and engineers that were cited in media reports also overwhelmingly reflected the views of the journalists rather than the views of the scientists and engineers; media reporting suggested that the scientific community is sharply divided over the question of nuclear power, with a majority of scientists opposing the development of nuclear energy.

== See also ==
- Corporate censorship
- Mainstream media
- Media bias in the United States
- Propaganda model
