= Statistical Assessment Service =

- Legal status: Non-profit
- President: Samuel Robert Lichter, founder and president
- Affiliations: Center for Media and Public Affairs, Science Literacy Project
- Website: http://stats.org/

Statistical Assessment Service (STATS) was a non-profit organization that analyzed and critiqued the presentation of scientific findings and statistical evidence in the news media. Formerly associated with George Mason University and the Center for Media and Public Affairs, STATS is currently associated with Jon Entine's Science Literacy Project and Sense About Science USA.

== History ==
STATS was founded in 1994 by S. Robert Lichter, a professor of communications at George Mason University.

In 2001, Lichter and his staff published It Ain't Necessarily So, a book about the media's coverage of a range of topics from crime statistics to the 2001 anthrax attacks. The Philadelphia Inquirer called it "a solid critique of the way data-based reports and studies are presented in the media", while Salon.com felt that the book employed "the very same tactics that it finds so objectionable when used by journalists and publishers".

In 2007, STATS sponsored a survey of climate scientists, which was conducted by Harris International. The survey found that most climate scientists believe that human-induced global warming is occurring, although there is disagreement about its consequences, and few trust the popular media coverage of climate change.

In 2009, the Milwaukee Journal-Sentinel argued that STATS's coverage of the chemical Bisphenol A verged on advocacy for the chemical industry. On the STATS website, Lichter posted a response disputing the Journal-Sentinel article, calling its reporting and logic "flawed".

In 2010, Donors Trust awarded STATS $86,000 for its "research efforts".

STATS was dissolved in 2014, and its website adopted by Sense About Science USA.

== Overview ==
According to its website in 2006, the organization's goal was to help correct "scientific misinformation in the media resulting from bad science, politics, or a simple lack of information or knowledge; and to act as a resource for journalists and policy makers on major scientific issues and controversies".

Lichter was quoted by the Baltimore Sun in 1998, saying, "journalists are deluged with numbers representing findings in fields they're not familiar with". Its sister organization is the Center for Media and Public Affairs, also affiliated with George Mason.

=== Personnel ===
Before the organization was dissolved in 2016, Lichter served as the organization's president. Other personnel included director of research Rebecca Goldin, a professor of mathematical sciences at George Mason and the Ruth Michler Fellow at Cornell University, and STATS.org editor Trevor Butterworth, who is also listed as a senior fellow, and writes for the Huffington Post. As of 2010, other senior fellows included Maia Szalavitz, a contributor to Reason magazine, and Stephen Rose.

The first director of STATS was David Murray, who previously worked for The Heritage Foundation and was later chief scientist for the U.S. Office of National Drug Control Policy. STATS is now a project of Sense About Science USA

=== Fundraising ===
The organization does not publicize their donors nor disclose their donors on Internal Revenue Service filings, but a review of IRS documents did show a $100,000 donation from the Sarah Scaife Foundation in 2007, a number that nearly equaled the listed assets of the Statistical Assessment Service.

== Activities ==
STATS produced an annual list called the "Dubious Data Awards", highlighting egregious factual inaccuracies in news reporting. In 2006, it challenged a study by the Center on Addiction and Substance Abuse, used by The New York Times and Forbes, which claimed that almost half of the alcohol industry's revenue came from underage drinkers. According to STATS, American teenagers who drink alcohol would each have to consume more than 1,000 drinks per year for this to be true. STATS has also disagreed with recommendations from Time that parents should discontinue use of soft vinyl toys, teethers, and similar products containing phthalates. STATS made this case based on the fact that phthalates in children's toys have been cleared for use by the U.S. Consumer Product Safety Commission; however, the European Union's Institute for Health and Consumer Protection has taken the opposite position, restricting the use of phthalate plasticizers in children's toys since 1998 and banning their manufacture in the E.U. in 2015 due to persistent health concerns. The annual list has received coverage from The Washington Post and the Los Angeles Times, among other news organizations.

In 2004, STATS was quoted in newspaper articles about the use of statistics in political rhetoric. During the presidential election of 2004, the organization challenged claims by both George W. Bush and John Kerry at the request of the Associated Press.

STATS sponsored educational workshops, seminars, and webinars, such as the 2013 webinar, "Understanding Risk: A Primer for Journalists" at the National Press Foundation. Goldin lectures at universities and colleges across the country about the use and misuse of statistics, and was a Nifty Fifty Speaker for the U.S. Science and Engineering Festival in both 2012 and 2014.
