= S. Robert Lichter =

Samuel Robert Lichter is a professor of communication at George Mason University, where he directs the Center for Media and Public Affairs, which conducts scientific studies of the news and entertainment media, and formerly directed the Statistical Assessment Service (STATS), which works to improve the quality of statistical and scientific information in the news.

== Academia ==
Lichter has taught political science at Princeton, Georgetown, and George Washington universities, and he was a research faculty member at Yale University and Columbia University. He was also a National Endowment for the Humanities Fellow at Smith College and held the DeWitt Wallace Chair in Mass Communications at the American Enterprise Institute. He received his Ph.D. in government from Harvard University and his B.A., summa cum laude, from the University of Minnesota.

== Scholarly work ==
Lichter has authored or co-authored fourteen books and over a hundred scholarly articles and monographs on the news and entertainment media. His best-known work, The Media Elite, (written with Stanley Rothman and Linda Lichter, and funded by conservative foundations) argued that journalists, on average, held more liberal political views than the general public, and that their backgrounds and outlooks affect their coverage of the news. This claim was extended by conservative pundits as evidence for a liberal bias in the media. It also provoked widespread debate among journalists and their critics. The Media Elite was based on interviews with major media journalists and content analysis of their work.

Lichter and his co-authors have also written on the social and political perspectives of popular culture, in books such as Prime Time and Watching America, as well as on news coverage of science and health issues, in Environmental Cancer—A Political Disease and It Ain't Necessarily So. His most recent books (written with Stephen Farnsworth) are The Nightly News Nightmare: Television Coverage of Presidential Elections (2006, 2nd ed.); and The Mediated Presidency: Television News and Presidential Governance (2005). These works use content analysis to examine the media's coverage of government and election campaigns.

In 1986 Lichter and his late ex-wife, sociologist Linda Lichter, established the Center for Media and Public Affairs (CMPA), a non-profit organization that sought to influence public debate on the media by publishing frequent studies of media coverage using the social scientific tool of content analysis. This was the first time this type of academic research was used on a regular and systematic basis to affect the general public's view of the media. Since then other groups have followed suit, including the Annenberg School for Communication and the Pew Foundation's Project for Excellence in Journalism. In 2004 the CMPA became affiliated with the George Mason University.

== Bibliography ==
=== Journal articles ===
- Stanley Rothman; Neil Nevitte & S. Robert Lichter (March 2005). "Politics and Professional Advancement". Academic Questions. 18 (2): 71–84. doi:10.1007/s12129-005-1008-y. S2CID 143263315. Reprinted on the occasion of the award by the National Association of Scholars of the Sidney Hook Memorial Award to Stanley Rothman, 22 May 2004. Originally published online in The Forum (subscription required).
