= Center for Media and Public Affairs =

The Center for Media and Public Affairs (CMPA) is a self-described nonpartisan and nonprofit research and educational organization that is affiliated with George Mason University in Fairfax, Virginia. It was founded in 1985 by political scientists Samuel Robert Lichter and his ex-wife Linda Lichter. It published a newsletter called Media Monitor from 1987 to 2010.

== Research ==
The CMPA conducts studies of the news and entertainment media. Among its activities are a continuing analysis and tabulation of late night political jokes, an annual report on diversity among network news journalists, and a content analysis of the nightly news on the major broadcast and cable news networks.

The results of the latter are compiled in the CMPA newsletter. CMPA engages in health communication research, investigating the way in which scientific issues are conveyed in the media. CMPA also engages in survey research to determine the accuracy of media's reports of scientific opinion.

CMPA conducts social scientific research on media coverage with the use of such techniques as content analysis and survey research. Its studies appear in academic journals and reference works as well as in popular media outlets.

CMPA's signature activity is its "rapid response" studies of media coverage of current issues, which appear quickly enough to influence ongoing public debates, such as presidential campaigns, Senate confirmation hearings, and major policy debates in Congress.

Although CMPA avoids taking stands on political issues, its studies have sometimes become part of the public debate over the media's role in politics and society. For example, in 1992 a CMPA study found that the average length of a presidential candidate's soundbite on the evening news had dropped to less than ten seconds, down from 42 seconds in 1968. In response CBS adopted a policy requiring longer soundbites on the CBS Evening News. Edward S. Herman and Noam Chomsky asserted in Manufacturing Consent (1988) that the CMPA, along with several similar organizations, create "flak", which they define as "negative responses to a media statement or program" which they maintained is part of a project of "disciplining the media."

CMPA studies of entertainment media have been used by members of the United States Congress such as Sen. Joe Lieberman (I-CT) in their efforts to reduce gratuitous violence and sex in television entertainment. CMPA's research on entertainment media has also included studies of how various groups have been portrayed on television, such as studies of Hispanic Americans' portrayals commissioned by the National Council of La Raza and the U.S. Commission on Civil Rights.

== Media Monitor ==
Media Monitor was the bi-monthly publication of the Center for Media and Public Affairs, which presented the central findings of one or more research studies on media monitoring. It was started in 1987 and last published in 2010. It was a concise analysis of contemporary media coverage and the controversies that surround it. The research published was the result of quantitative content analysis of television, print, and radio news.

== Funding ==
The media watchdog group Fairness and Accuracy in Reporting (FAIR) has challenged CMPA's non-partisan claim, based on the argument that much of its funding has come from conservative sources, and that its founder, Samuel Robert Lichter, once held a chair in mass communications at the American Enterprise Institute and was a Fox News contributor. After a Washington Post article referred to CMPA as "conservative," the Post published a "Clarification," which concluded, "The Center describes itself as nonpartisan, and its studies have been cited by both conservative and liberal commentators."
