= A. Thomas McLellan =

American government official

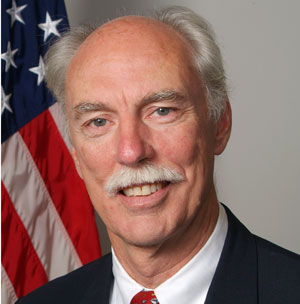

Deputy Director of the Office of National Drug Control Policy
- In office 2009–2010
- President: Barack Obama
- Succeeded by: Michael Botticelli

Personal details
- Born: May 29, 1948 (age 78) Staten Island, New York
- Education: Colgate University (B.A.); Bryn Mawr College (M.S., Ph.D.)

A. Thomas McLellan (born May 29, 1949, in Staten Island, New York) is the founder and chairman of the board of directors at the Treatment Research Institute, a not-for-profit research and development institute in Philadelphia. He served as deputy director of the Office of National Drug Control Policy from 2009 to 2012.

McLellan received his B.A. from Colgate University and his M.S. and Ph.D. from Bryn Mawr College. He received postgraduate training in psychology at Oxford University. He has since worked for the Veterans Administration Medical Center in Philadelphia and the University of Pennsylvania.

McLellan was the principal developer of the Addiction Severity Index (ASI) and the Treatment Services Review (TSR), widely used substance abuse instruments. He has served as an adviser to many government and nonprofit scientific organizations, including the Office of National Drug Control Policy, the National Practice Laboratory of the American Psychiatric Association, the Swiss National Science Foundation, the World Health Organization, the Greek government and Public Health England.

McLellan served as the deputy director of the Office of National Drug Control Policy under the Obama administration.

Among McLellan's many honors and awards are the Life Achievement Award of the American Society of Addiction Medicine in 2003 and the 2002 award for Distinguished Contribution in Addiction Medicine from the Swedish Medical Association. He has served as editor-in-chief of the Journal of Substance Abuse Treatment.
