= Journal of Substance Use and Addiction Treatment =

- Discipline: Addiction medicine
- Language: English
- Edited by: Hannah K. Knudsen

Publication details
- History: 1984-present
- Publisher: Elsevier
- Frequency: Monthly
- Impact factor: 3.917 (2021)

Standard abbreviations
- ISO 4: J. Subst. Abuse Treat.

Indexing
- CODEN: JSATEG
- ISSN: 0740-5472 (print); 1873-6483 (web)

Links
- Journal homepage; Online access; Online archive

The Journal of Substance Use and Addiction Treatment (JSAT; formerly Journal of Substance Abuse Treatment) is a peer-reviewed medical journal covering research on substance use and drug addiction, and the treatment of such disorders. It was established in 1984 and is currently published monthly by Elsevier. The editor-in-chief is Hannah K. Knudsen (University of Kentucky).

According to the Journal Citation Reports, the journal has a 2022 impact factor of 3.9. It is thus ranked #11 out of 38 journals within the category of Substance Abuse. However, according to another metric, the TQCC (top quartile citation count), Journal of Substance Use and Addiction Treatment is ranked #1 in that category as of early 2024.
