= Addiction severity index =

Clinical assessment tool

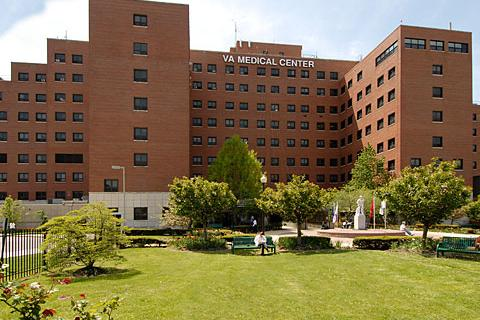
Male veterans with drug or alcohol addictions from the Philadelphia VA Medical Center have been recruited for the establishment of ASI.

The Addiction Severity Index (ASI) is used to assess the severity of patient's addiction and analyse the need of treatment which has been in use for more than 2 decades since its publication in 1992. It is used in a variety of settings such as clinics, mental health services in the US, the Indian Health Service and several European countries. One of its major applications is as a clinical assessment tool for clinicians to determine the severity of the addictions and the necessity for treatment through probing the patients' conditions in both health and social issues. 7 aspects including medical health, employment/ support status, drug and alcohol use, illegal activity and legal status, family and social relationships and psychiatric health were inquired.

The ASI offers a more complete assessment of patients' conditions than other tools as the authors believed that the detrimental effects in health and social aspects are not merely the results of addictions and these issues could not be simply resolved by reducing the use of substances. Despite the lack of clarity on the causal relationship between socioeconomic determinants of health and addiction, it was found that the health and social problems often are more valued by the patients rather than the addiction itself and in other cases, these complex issues would be the causes of relapses, showing the greater role of health and social problems in dealing with addiction. Hence, the ASI would like to delve deeper into the socioeconomic determinants of health of patients to better evaluate specific plans targeting these specific areas.

== History ==
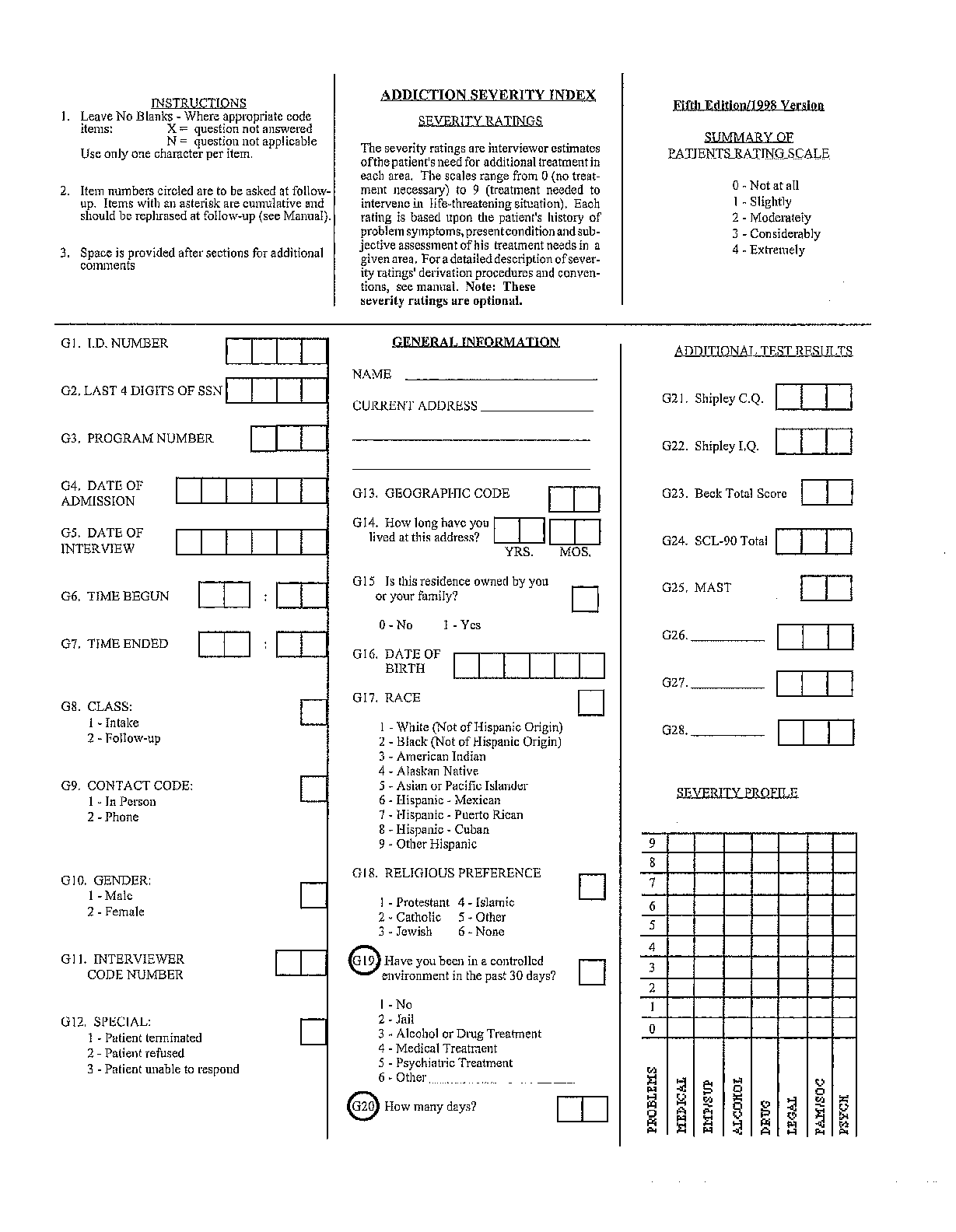
This is the 1st page of the ASI-5. It inquires about the demographic background of the patient. It also allows interviewer to record the optional severity index.

Before the development of the ASI, it was assumed that the addiction could be characterized by measuring the nature, amount, and duration of their substance use and would directly lead to health and social problems or even criminal behaviors. Hence, the foundation of addiction therapy with the aim of reducing substance use was laid. However, it was noticed that addiction could not be understood by simply assessing the characteristics of addiction itself. This was exemplified by ASI that an anesthesiologist with severe opioid addiction but better personal and social support would have a better outcome than a pregnant woman with less severe cocaine addiction but worse criteria such as alcohol use, sexual behavior and educational level. This shows the previous assumption was only partially correct and reflected a more complex relationship between substance addiction and health and social problems. While there is a possibility that addiction is the direct cause of the health and social issues, their causal relationship could also be swapped, or unrelated as they are caused by inherited personality or a combination of economic, social and genetic factors. Coupled with findings depicting that variation in the substance abuse treatment showed little effect on outcomes while the addition of health and/ or social services showed improved outcomes, the development of ASI funded by the Veterans Administration (VA) began in 1977 with an emphasis on analyzing patients' health and social background.

In the beginning, around 250 questions were prepared for the target population of 524 male veterans with alcohol and drug addictions from Coatesville and Philadelphia VA Medical Centers. Face-to-face interviews were conducted in a six-month period in which researchers improved the survey by not only seeking answers to the questions but also asking them whether they understand the meaning of the questions and whether others would interpret the questions in the same manner. The "asking, listening, re-asking, and re-thinking" procedures would eventually narrow the survey down to 164 items categorized into 7 aspects.

The third version of ASI was established in 1980. This version of ASI adopted a ten-point severity rating which is assessed during patients' interviews with clinical staff. But clinical staff complained that the rating is difficult due to insufficient summary information. Thus, the interviewer severity rating (ISR) was proposed. However, several drawbacks of ISR, such as subjective data and low flexibility made it hard to apply in clinical practice. With this concern, the quantitative Composite scores (CSs), which were derived from clinical trials and errors, were applied. Both CSs and ISR have shown test-retest reliability and were used in ASI (details refer to the scoring system).

Owing to the new finding of drug and alcohol abuse treatment in the 1990s, the ASI saw the introduction of newer items regarding addiction-related disorder and drug use, route of drug administration, antisocial personality disorder, trauma on top of the pre-existing framework of ASI-3, leading to the publication of ASI-5 in 1992.

== Structure ==
=== Content ===
The ASI-5 survey contains a total of 164 items inquiring about the general background of the patients (n= 28), their conditions in the respective areas would be asked in the following according to the participants' preference on privacy recorded during the development of ASI: 1) Medical health (n= 11) 2) Employment/ support status (n= 24) 3 & 4) Drug/ alcohol use (n= 35) 5) Illegal activity/ legal status (n= 32) 6) Family/ social relationships (n= 38) and 7) Psychiatric health (n= 23).

The general situations of each area would first be inquired, then patients are asked to rate in certain questions on their subjective feeling on the area. Next, interviewers would be able to estimate a score in the interviewer severity rating based on both objective and subjective information inquired. Lastly, a confidence rating would be given by the interviewers.

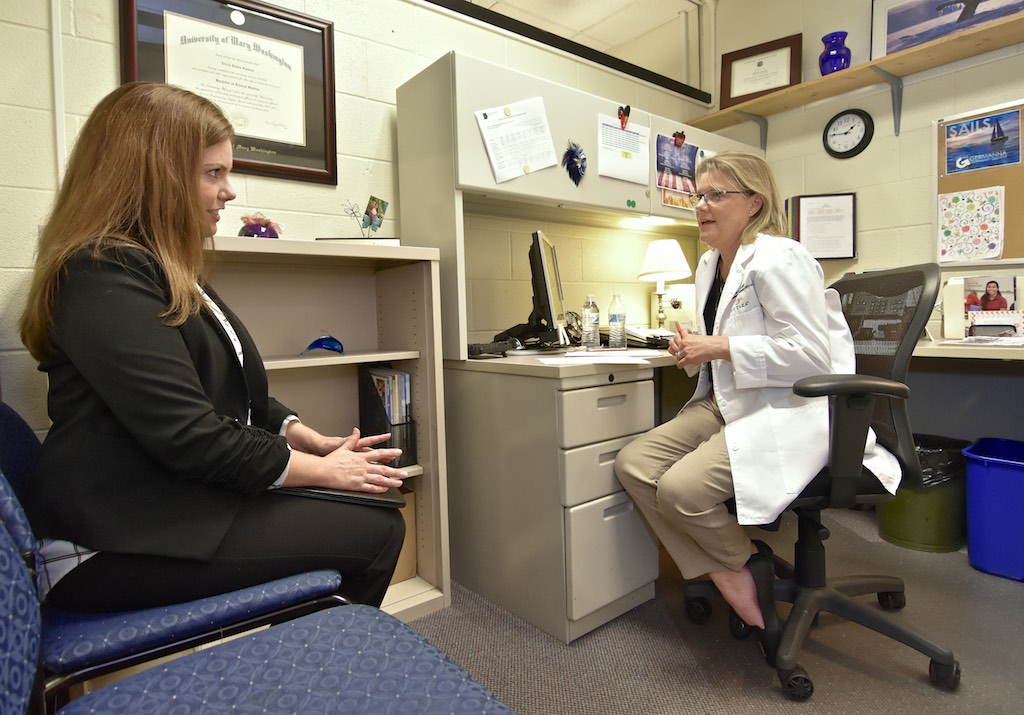
An interview using the ASI would be conducted with the patient alone and entirely confidential to safeguard the privacy of the patient.

In the medical, alcohol, drug and psychiatric sections, there are the "Final Three" questions (the number of questions including, but not limited to 3) placed before the estimation of interviewer severity rating in which they are logically related. For instance, in the "medical health" area, question 6 inquires about the frequency of experiencing medical problems in the last 30 days, question 7 inquires about the frequency of being troubled by these medical problems (referring to question 6) and question 8 inquires about the importance of treatment for these medical problems (also referring to question 6). It could be seen that if question 6 is answered 0, questions 7 and 8 should also be answered 0. On the other hand, if question 6 is a non-zero positive number, questions 7 and 8 should also be answered with non-zero positive numbers.

Confidence rating contains 2 questions confirming the full understanding of the interviewees which are rated by the interviewers. The items would ensure that there are no misrepresentations by the patients and they are able to understand all parts of the questions under certain sections.

=== Interview process ===
Despite the feasibility of self-administration of the ASI with similar consistency as face-to-face interview, the survey would be preferably conducted in an interactive interview privately as it ensures interviewees could understand all the questions by further repeating, paraphrasing as well as probing and as a gesture of politeness and support to patients. The first interview which is done at admission would be estimated to complete within 45–75 minutes and the follow-up interview would be completed within 25–30 minutes.

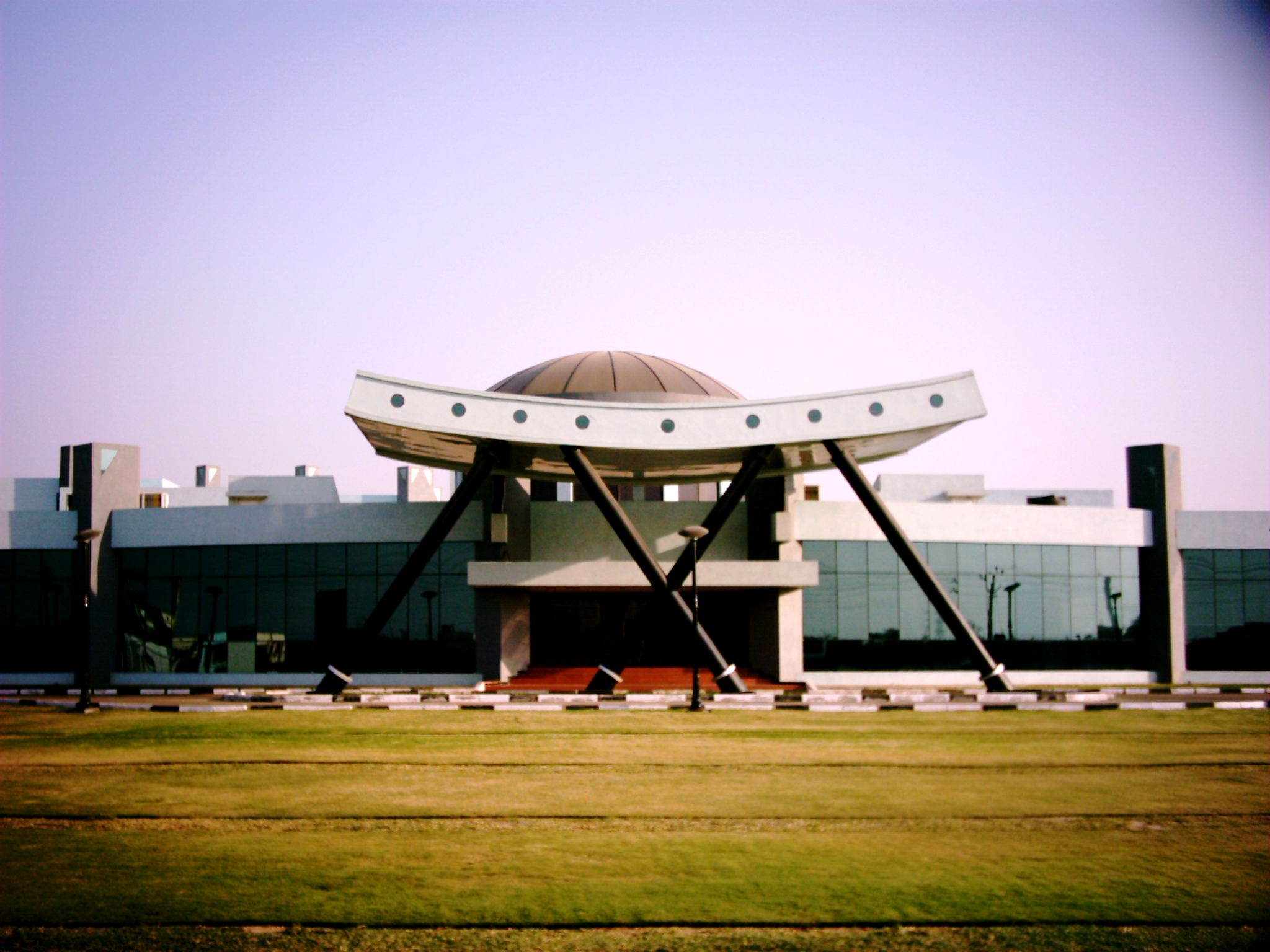
Pharmaceutical companies using ASI in several pharmacovigilance studies to test for product abuse liability

=== Application ===
The original purpose of ASI was to serve as a standardized data collection instrument for clinical staff for the determination of the severity of the addiction of patients through objective and subjective information. The estimated severity rating would guide the clinicians to determine the urgency of treatments. It was also designed for research staff to test for the efficacy of interventions by comparing the before and after results of the ASI using CSs.

The popularity of ASI grew as other languages of the ASI-5 was found to be equally reliable and valid. It could also be seen that the use of ASI was spread beyond the field of medicine and research. The expansion of populations that the ASI was used on besides the substance-dependent treatment population sees the increase of its versatility. Since 2000, the ASI has been used in sectors ranging from welfare to criminal justice to employment. It was also used in conjunction with other indexes to have extensive reviews on not only the effectiveness but also the cost-effectiveness of novel treatment. Lastly, the ASI is adopted in several pharmacovigilance studies by pharmaceutical companies to test for products abuse liability.

== Scoring ==
=== Definition ===
The scoring system enables clinicians to determine the severity of the addiction of the patients which is defined as the need for treatment where there currently is none; or for an additional form or type of treatment where the patient is currently receiving some form of treatment, instead of a deviation from optimum function. It was exemplified that if a patient with extremely poor uncorrected vision but was adjusted with glasses, their pathological condition would be classified as severe yet using the definition used in ASI, their severity would be rated as minimal as they were well-adjusted with glasses for daily activities. In addition, it is of paramount importance to understand that the ratings do not indicate the potential benefits from treatments but depict the extent to which some forms of effective interventions are needed regardless of their existence and availability.

=== Scoring system ===
In clinical practice, two scores would be derived for each section by reviewing the patient's situation in two time frames, including lifetime and past-30 days from the date of the interview. The scores from each section are independent of each other including the ISR and patient severity item. The ISR is determined by both objective information that are verifiable tests and patients' judgement of severity. Interviewers would gather all the objective information and a range of scores would be selected based on a 10-point system. The system would be listed below:

Scores	Interviewer severity rating
0–1	No real problem, treatment not indicated
2–3	Slight problem, treatment probably not necessary
4–5	Moderate problem, some treatment indicated
6–7	Considerable problem, treatment necessary
8–9	Extreme problem, treatment absolutely necessary

Once a specific range is selected, the exact score would be determined based on the subjective information provided by the patient. It would be related to their subjective perceptions of their addictions only for the past 30 days before the initiation of the interview and they would be asked to grade by themselves based on a 5-point system. The scale would be listed below:

Scores	Patients' judgement of severity
0	Not at all
1	Slightly
2	Moderately
3	Considerably
4	Extremely

Patients could leave the question blank if they are uncomfortable to answer.

Once the interviewers have selected the suitable range of severity rating, they would further derive the exact score based on the patients' subjective judgement. Should the patient choose higher scores in these specific questions, the higher point of the range would be selected. If lower scores are rated by the patient, a middle or lower score of the range would be pinpointed by the interviewers.

Despite the tested reliability and validity of the ISR and its ability to summarize patients' overall status in clinical admission, it has several drawbacks that made it not favourable for research purposes. Its subjective nature means that biases would easily be introduced during research analysis. In addition, its reliability and validity only last when all the data is available and the interviews are done face to face which might not be in follow-ups.

=== Composite scores ===
With reference to the shortcomings of ISR, composite scores (CSs) are derived specifically to evaluate changes over time and relativity to different population groups in research. CSs are used in a scoring system that could be calculated for each of the 7 aspects by combining items from specific questions inquiring about the past 30-day status with equal weighting. In view of the possibility of large variations between answers (e.g.: patient rating scale of 0–4 and money earned), the composites would be calculated by dividing each item within a composite by its maximum value, then divide again by the total number of questions in the said composite. Finally, summation of all the scores will generate a score between 0 and 1.

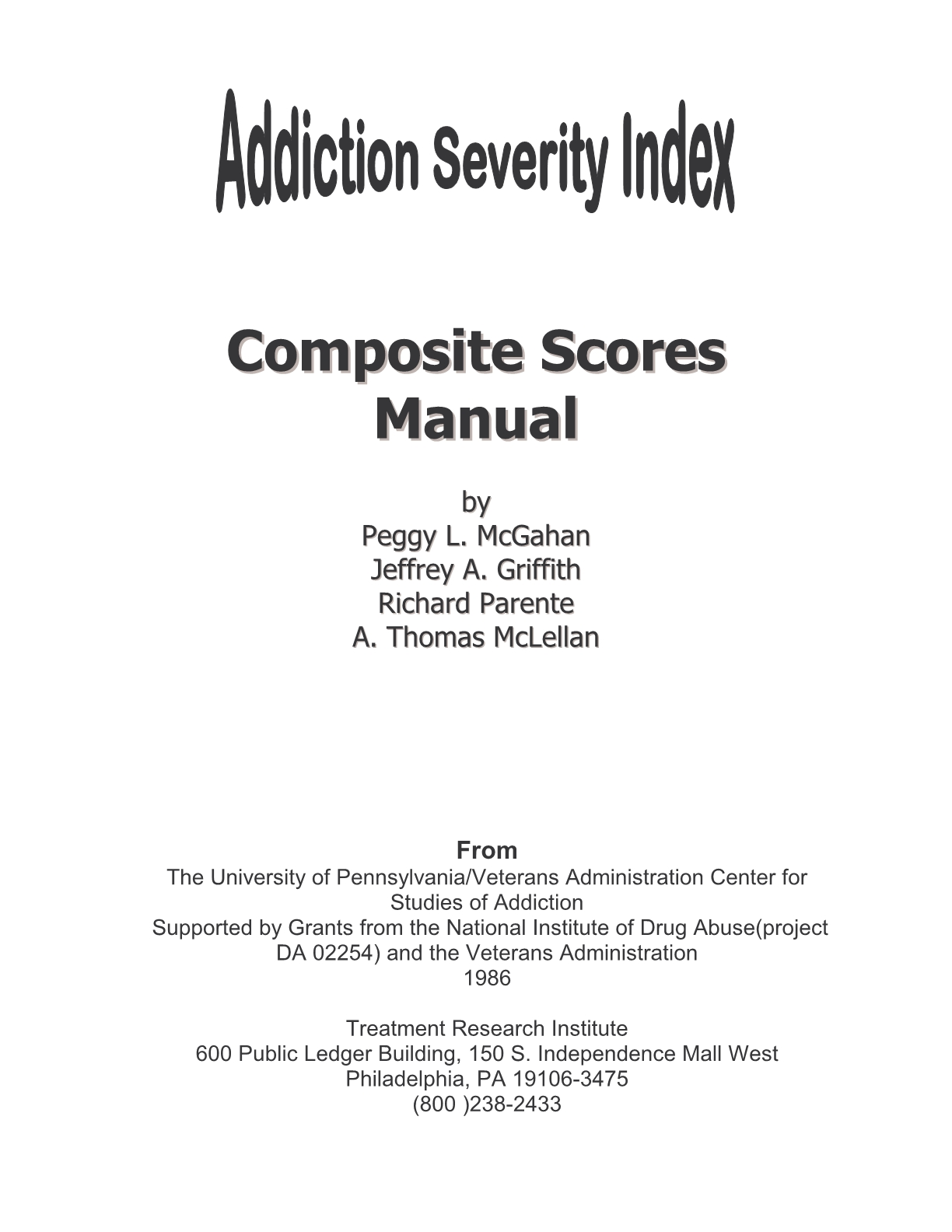
This is the cover page of the ASI composite score manual.

An example has been depicted in the composite score manual. In the medical sections, three questions are included in the composite score calculation:

A. How many days have you experienced medical problems in the last 30? (Maximum value = 30)

B. How troubled or bothered have you been by your medical problems in the past 30 days? (Maximum value = 4 (Patient's rating))

C. How important to you now is treatment for these medical problems? (Maximum value = 4 (Patient's rating))

If the answer recorded for the three questions were 15 days for A, a rating of 3/4 for B and a rating of 4/4 for C. The score would be calculated using the equation below:

$(15/30)/3+ (3/4)/3+ (4/4)/3= 0.750$

Although the CSs are a measure of problem severity, with high scores indicating higher severity, their intrinsic value would have little meaning and they could not be compared between different aspects probed. CSs are advised to be only used for measuring changes in various time-points of treatments or relative outcomes between groups.

=== Confidence rating ===
There are 2 possible scores that could be given to each of the 2 questions in the confidence rating (0= No and 1= Yes). Factors ranging from unjustified contradiction of information to lack of confidence in answering, patients' misrepresentation to poor understanding of questions due to reasons including but not limited to language barrier and illiteracy all contribute to poor confidence rating. Interviewers are encouraged to recognize and reconcile the aforementioned issues. But the interview would be terminated and rescheduled should the problems would not be resolved.

== Ongoing improvement of ASI ==
A graphical demonstration of reliability and validity in statistical analysis.

As clinicians gained more experience with the use of ASI-5 in real-life practice, it was pointed out that some questions in the questionnaire might be overlapping with information collected during admission. In a bid to avoid duplication and wasting medical resources, a condensed form of ASI, ASI-Lite was introduced in 1997. Modifications were done including the removal of interviewer severity rating, removal of questions pertaining to family/genetic heritability and emotional problems and the inclusions of research-oriented questions. It consists of 111 items and requires 30–40 minutes to complete. Since most key elements are retained, ASI-Lite and ASI-5 showed similar reliability and validity.

ASI-5 and ASI-Lite are continued to be used during clinical admission until the 21st century. Yet, a useful instrument should be reviewed and re-evaluated overtime to keep up with the advance in technology and change in social norms, coupled with the wider use of the ASI outside of clinical and research purposes, fundamental changes are brought to the development of a newer ASI, the ASI-6.

The principle of the revision is to add more content in each domain while shortening training and testing time, as well as retaining the essential element in ASI. The addition of new content such as queries on the date of most recent occurrence of more severe symptoms, days of hospitalizations for mental health problems and recent patients' status ranging from homelessness to pregnancy, tobacco use to gambling aimed to provide wider coverage. In addition, a time frame of 6-month was added for cost-related questions on top of the lifetime and past 30-day time frames in view of increased popularity in use cost-effectiveness analysis. In view of the additional content, "skip-outs" could be employed on screening questions to keep the interview within an hour. In terms of data analysis, confirmatory non-linear analysis was added to better meet the new application of ASI-6. All in all, the ASI-6 is supported to be used clinically and in research with acceptable scalability, reliability and concurrent validity. The ASI would continued to be improved with reference to the updating knowledge in psychology and the ever-changing socioeconomic factors in the society.
