= Alcoholics Anonymous =

American sobriety-focused mutual help fellowship

- Nickname: AA
- Formation: 1935; 91 years ago
- Founders: Bill Wilson (Bill W.); Bob Smith (Dr. Bob)
- Founded at: Akron, Ohio, US
- Type: Mutual aid addiction recovery twelve-step program
- Headquarters: New York City, US
- Members: 1,967,613 (2021)
- Website: aa.org

Alcoholics Anonymous (AA) is a global mutual aid fellowship originating in the US dedicated solely to abstinence-based recovery from alcoholism through its spiritually inclined Twelve Steps. AA's organizational principles are outlined in its Twelve Traditions and Twelve Concepts. In 2021 AA estimated it was active in 180 countries with nearly two million members — 73% in the United States and Canada.

AA dates its origin to a 1935 Akron, Ohio meeting between Bill Wilson, or Bill W, and Bob Smith, or Dr. Bob (for anonymity, members often go by first name and last name initial). They met through the Christian revivalist Oxford Group and continued under its aegis to fellowship with other alcoholics until forming what became AA. In 1939 the fellowship introduced its Twelve Steps with the publication of Alcoholics Anonymous: The Story of How More than One Hundred Men Have Recovered from Alcoholism. Known as "the Big Book", later editions amended the subtitle with "Thousands of Men and Women".

The Twelve Steps are a suggested, but not required, ongoing self-improvement program to abstain from alcohol with the aid of a personally chosen higher power. After admitting to no control of drinking, chaotic lives, and the need for divine assistance, transgressions and personal failings of morals and character are listed and atoned for. To maintain these gains, appeal is made to an undefined "God as we understood Him", and the carrying of AA's message to other alcoholics, which is often done through voluntarily attending and being of service at meetings and by sponsoring other alcoholics.

In 1950 AA formally adopted its 12 Traditions. Besides stressing anonymity and a primary focus on helping other alcoholics, they strive to keep AA free to all with no governing hierarchy while abstaining from public controversies and unallied with other institutions, organizations or causes.

AA meeting formats vary with some being studies of AA literature and others have speakers and attendees sharing what AA calls their "experience, strength and hope" from speakers and/or from attendees. Open meetings restrict no one, while others are for distinct demographics such as LGBTQIA+, and men or women only meetings are common. Agnostic and atheist meetings are also not uncommon.

In regards to AA's effectiveness, a 2020 Cochrane review found that AA involvement via Twelve-Step Facilitation (TSF) therapy demonstrated higher rates of continuous abstinence, and compared to other treatments, including cognitive behavioral therapy, AA attendance over time resulted in better healthcare cost savings. (Note: Regarding "manualized AA and Twelve-Step Facilitation (TSF) therapy", manualized means "the treatment is based on standardized content delivered in a linear or modular fashion to ensure that the same treatment is delivered across time and different sites where the intervention may be implemented. This ensures that the treatment can be replicated – a key factor in confirming the findings across different studies using the same treatment." (2020 Cochrane review article, p. 5, PDF version).)

== History ==
Rowland Hazard's journey from Carl Jung's psychiatric treatment to spiritual conversion through the Oxford Group played a pivotal role in shaping the foundations of Alcoholics Anonymous, influencing its principles of recovery. In 1926, Hazard went to Zurich, Switzerland, to seek treatment for alcoholism with psychiatrist Carl Jung. When Hazard ended treatment with Jung after about a year, and came back to the US, he soon resumed drinking, and returned to Jung in Zurich for further treatment. Jung told Hazard that his case was nearly hopeless (as with other alcoholics) and that his only hope might be a "spiritual conversion" with a "religious group".

Back in America, Hazard went to the Oxford Group, whose teachings were eventually the source of such AA concepts as "meetings" and "sharing" (public confession), making "restitution", "rigorous honesty" and "surrendering one's will and life to God's care". He became converted to a lifetime of sobriety while on a train ride from New York to Detroit after reading For Sinners Only, by Oxford Group member AJ Russell. Hazard underwent a "spiritual conversion" with the help of the Group and began to experience the liberation from drink that he was seeking. Members of the group introduced Hazard to Ebby Thacher, whom Hazard brought to the Calvary Rescue Mission, directed by Oxford Group leader Sam Shoemaker.

In keeping with the Oxford Group teaching that a new convert must win other converts to preserve his own conversion experience, Thacher contacted his old friend Bill Wilson, whom he knew had a drinking problem. Thacher approached Wilson, saying that he had "got religion", was sober, and that Wilson could do the same if he set aside objections and instead formed a personal idea of God, "another power" or "higher power".

Feeling a "kinship of common suffering", Wilson attended his first group gathering, although he was drunk. Within days, Wilson admitted himself to the Charles B. Towns Hospital after drinking four beers on the way—the last alcohol he ever drank. Under the care of William Duncan Silkworth, an early benefactor of AA, Wilson's detox included the deliriant belladonna. At the hospital, a despairing Wilson experienced a bright flash of light, which he felt to be God revealing himself.

=== Founding of AA ===
Following his hospital discharge, Wilson joined the Oxford Group and tried to recruit other alcoholics to the group. These early efforts to help others kept him sober, but were ineffective in getting anyone else to join the group. Silkworth suggested that Wilson place less stress on religion (as required by The Oxford Group) and more on the science of treating alcoholism. Bill W. would later write: "The early AA got its ideas of self-examination, acknowledgment of character defects, restitution for harm done, and working with others straight from the Oxford Group and directly from Sam Shoemaker, their former leader in America, and from nowhere else". According to Mercadante, however, the AA concept of powerlessness over alcohol departs significantly from Oxford Group belief. According to AA, alcoholism cannot be cured, whereas the Oxford Group stressed the possibility of complete victory over sin.

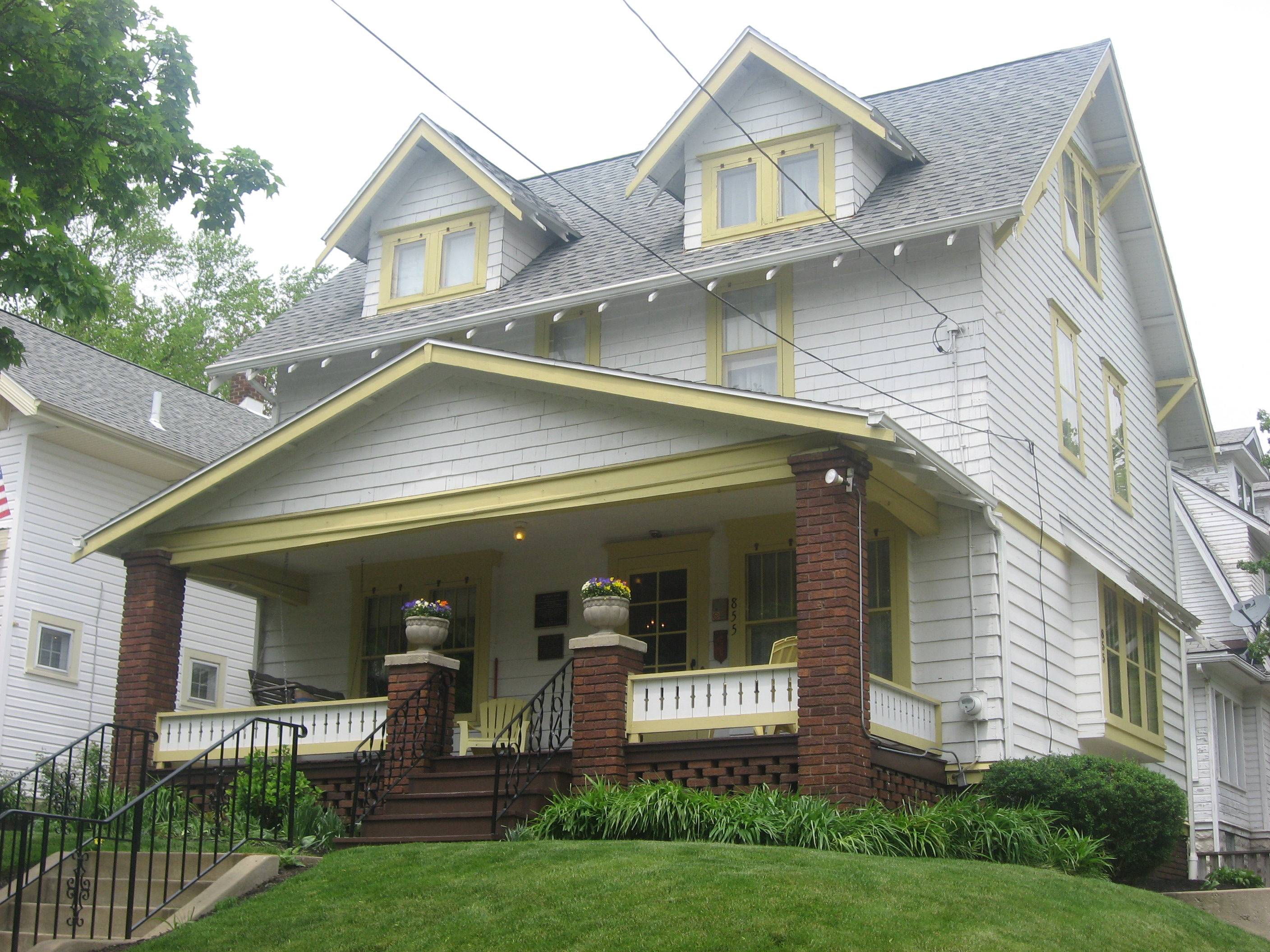
Robert Smith's house in Akron

In 1935, AA began in Akron, Ohio, as the outcome of a meeting between Wilson—who became known as "Bill W." in AA circles—and Robert "Dr. Bob" Smith, an Akron surgeon, who would become Wilson's first recruitment success. On a business trip by Bill W. to Akron, he was introduced to the surgeon, who despite connections with the Oxford Group, was unable to stay sober. Bill W. explained that alcoholism affects the mind, emotions, and body, a concept he had learned from Silkworth at Towns Hospital in New York, where he had been a patient multiple times. Convinced by these insights, Dr. Bob took his last alcoholic drink on 10 June 1935 and never drank again. This date is regarded by AA as its inception.

Bill W. and Dr. Bob started working with alcoholics at the Akron City Hospital. One patient, who soon achieved sobriety, joined them and together, the three men formed the foundation of what would later become known as Alcoholics Anonymous.

In late 1935, a new group of alcoholics began forming in New York, followed by another in Cleveland in 1939. Over the course of four years, these three initial groups helped around 100 people achieve sobriety. In early 1939, the fellowship published its foundational text, Alcoholics Anonymous, which outlined AA's philosophy; introduced the Twelve Steps; and included the case histories of 30 individuals who had achieved recovery. The Twelve Steps were influenced by the Oxford Group's six steps and various readings, including William James's The Varieties of Religious Experience. This publication marked a significant milestone in AA's development.

The first meeting outside the Oxford Group was held at Dr. Bob's house with 80 members in attendance. Dr. Bob began the meeting in his dining room by identifying himself as an alcoholic, and placing his foot on the dining room table, read the Sermon on the Mount from the Gospel of Matthew.

The first female member, Florence Rankin, joined AA in March 1937, and the first non-Protestant member, a Roman Catholic, joined in 1939. The first Black AA group commenced in 1945 in Washington, D.C., founded by Jim S., an African-American physician from Virginia.

=== The Alcoholic Foundation ===
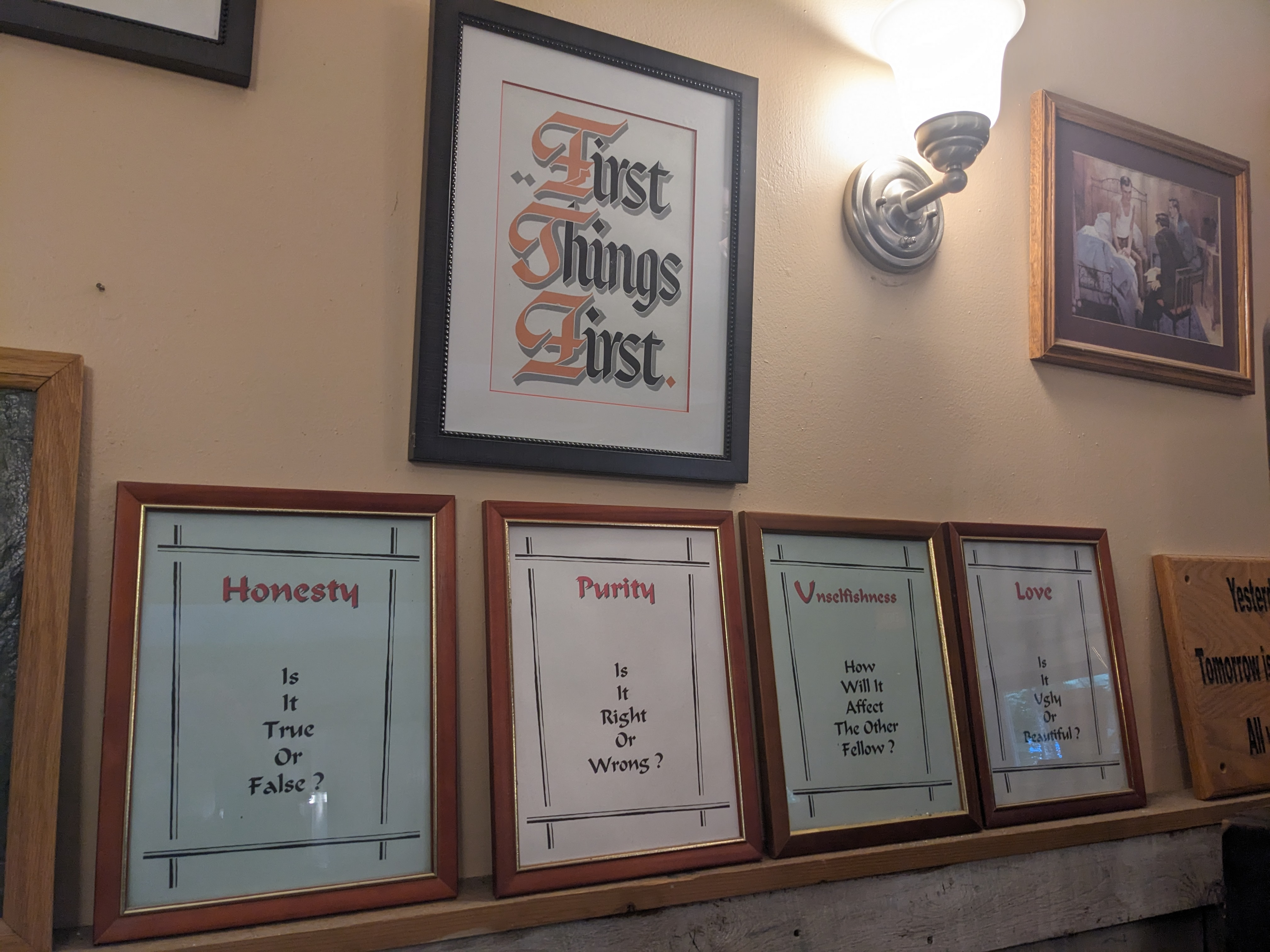
Alcoholics Anonymous material on walls at the Wilson House, 378 Village Street in downtown East Dorset, Vermont

In 1938, Dr. Bob and Bill created The Alcoholic Foundation in New York, bringing in friends of John D. Rockefeller Jr. as board members. Although they sought to raise significant funds, Rockefeller advised that large contributions might jeopardize the Fellowship. The foundation opened a small office in New York, funded primarily by AA members, to handle inquiries and distribute the Alcoholics Anonymous book. The next year, Rockefeller organized a dinner to promote AA, which further increased the number of inquiries. The office became effective. Each request received a personal reply and a pamphlet, enhancing interest in the book. Consequently, many new AA groups were established, and by the end of 1940, membership had grown to 2,000.

=== Media coverage leads to expansion ===
In 1939, media coverage, particularly from The Cleveland Plain Dealer, generated a surge of interest and requests for help. The Cleveland group, although small, successfully assisted many alcoholics, quickly growing from 20 to around 500 members. A subsequent article in Liberty magazine resulted in a flood of requests for assistance, further expanding AA's reach. In 1941, The Saturday Evening Post published an article about AA, sparking a surge in inquires, and AA membership tripled over the next year. AA-related interviews on American radio and favorable articles in US magazines led to increased book sales and membership.

As the growing fellowship faced disputes over structure, purpose, authority, and publicity, Bill W. began promoting the Twelve Traditions. He first introduced his ideas on these in an April 1946 article for The Grapevine, titled "Twelve Suggested Points for AA Tradition", aiming to preserve the organization's unity and purpose as AA expanded. He described the input he received as a "welter of exciting and fearsome experience" which greatly influenced the development of the Traditions. From December 1947 to November 1948, The Grapevine published the Traditions individually, and in 1950, the First International Convention in Cleveland officially adopted them.

=== Creation of the General Service Conference (GSC) ===
In 1951, AA's headquarters in New York expanded its activities, including public relations, support for new groups, services to hospitals and prisons, and cooperation with agencies in the field of alcoholism. It also published standard AA literature and oversaw translations, while the AA Grapevine gained substantial circulation. Despite these essential services, they were managed by a disconnected board of trustees, primarily linked to Bill and Dr. Bob.

Recognizing the need for accountability, delegates from across the US and Canada were convened, leading to the first meeting of the AA General Service Conference in 1951. This successful gathering established direct oversight of AA's trusteeship by the fellowship itself, ensuring the organization's future governance. At the 1955 conference in St. Louis, Missouri, Bill W. relinquished stewardship of AA to the General Service Conference, as AA had grown to millions of members internationally.

=== International expansion ===
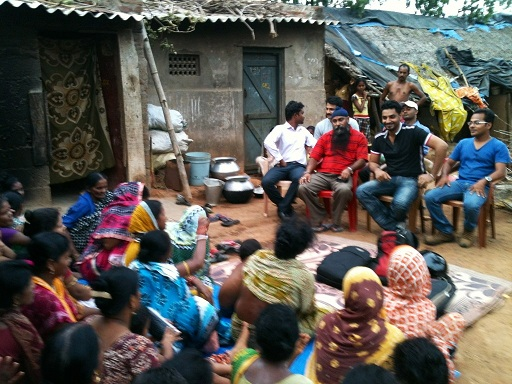
An AA meeting

The World Service Meeting (WSM), established in 1969, is a biennial international forum at which AA delegates from around the world exchange ideas and experiences about carrying the message of recovery. Held in various cities around the world, the WSM focuses on sharing strategies to help alcoholics in different countries and languages.

Today, AA is present in approximately 180 nations worldwide. By 2018, AA had 2,087,840 members and 120,300 AA groups worldwide. There are AA meetings in Beijing, China.

In July 2024, AA launched its first UK-wide advertising campaign with a unique approach—no logos, phone numbers, or links—focusing on subtle messaging like "You Are Not Alone" and "Alcohol Isn't the Answer". The campaign, created by The Raised Eyebrow Society, aims to attract people struggling with alcohol without violating AA's principles of anonymity and non-promotion.

AA will celebrate its 100th anniversary meeting in Indianapolis, Indiana, in 2035. The international convention is anticipated to attract tens of thousands of attendees to the Indiana Convention Center and Lucas Oil Stadium.

== AA literature ==
Alcoholics Anonymous publishes several books, reports, pamphlets, and other media, including a periodical known as the AA Grapevine. Two books are used primarily: Alcoholics Anonymous (the "Big Book") and, expounding on the big book in regard to its subject, Twelve Steps and Twelve Traditions. As with all AA literature, the texts are freely available on AA.org.

=== The Big Book ===
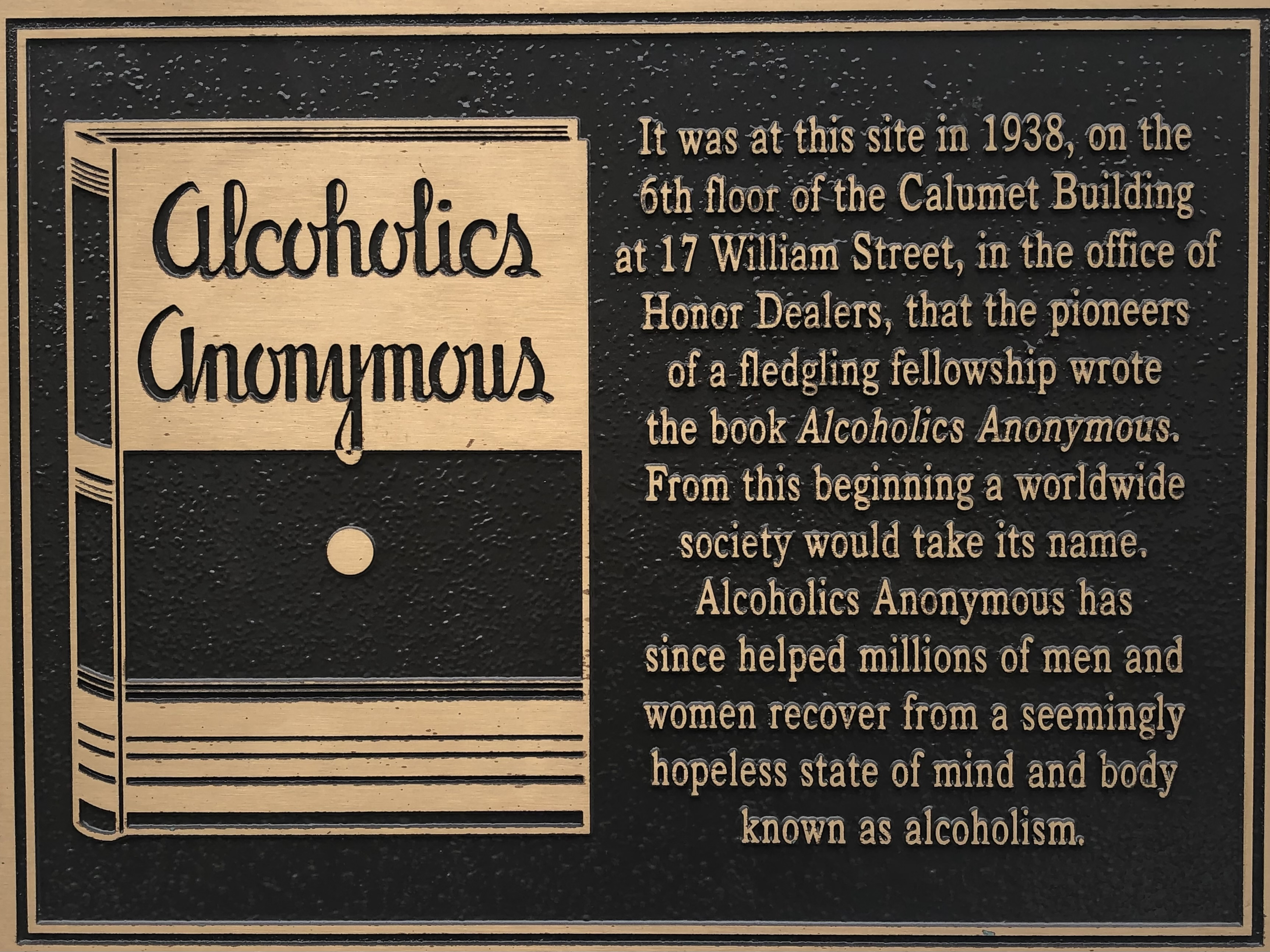
Plaque at site of Calumet Building in Newark where much of the text for the "Big Book" of Alcoholics Anonymous was written

In 1939, Bill W. and other members wrote the book initially titled Alcoholics Anonymous: The Story of How More than One Hundred Men Have Recovered from Alcoholism, from which AA drew its name, informally known as the "Big Book". The second edition of the Big Book was released in 1955, the third in 1976, and the fourth in 2001. The first part of the book, which details the program, has remained largely intact since the 1939 edition, with minor statistical updates and edits. The second part contains personal stories that are updated with every edition to reflect current AA membership, resulting in earlier stories being removed—these were published separately in 2003 in the book Experience, Strength, and Hope.

The Big Book suggests a twelve-step program in which members admit that they are powerless over alcohol and need help from a "higher power". It offers guidance and strength through prayer and meditation. It suggests that a member pray for guidance from God (or a higher power of one's own understanding); take a moral inventory with care to include resentments; list and become ready to remove character defects; list and make amends to those harmed; continue to take a moral inventory, pray, meditate, and try to help other alcoholics recover. The second half of the book, "Personal Stories" (subject to additions, removal, and retitling in subsequent editions), is made of AA members' redemptive autobiographical sketches.

==== Illness and allergy terminology ====
AA's Big Book calls alcoholism "an illness which only a spiritual experience will conquer". Ernest Kurtz says this is "The closest the book Alcoholics Anonymous comes to a definition of alcoholism". Somewhat divergently in his introduction to The Big Book, non-member and early benefactor William Silkworth said those unable to moderate their drinking suffer from an allergy. In presenting the doctor's postulate, AA said, "The doctor's theory that we have an allergy to alcohol interests us. As laymen, our opinion as to its soundness may, of course, mean little. But as ex-problem drinkers, we can say that his explanation makes good sense. It explains many things for which we cannot otherwise account". AA later acknowledged that "alcoholism is not a true allergy, the experts now inform us".

=== Twelve Steps and Twelve Traditions ===
The "Twelve Steps and Twelve Traditions" is a book published in 1953 that serves as a key text for AA. Written by AA co-founder Bill W., it provides detailed explanations of the Twelve Steps and the Twelve Traditions. The book is commonly used in AA meetings and individual study, offering a framework for understanding the organization's approach to recovery and community. The story of Eddie Rickenbacker "and his courageous company" appears in the book. It pertains to when his plane crashed in the Pacific and is used in the closing remarks of Tradition One: "Our common welfare should come first; personal recovery depends upon AA unity".

=== Grapevine ===
The Grapevine, established in June 1944 by six AA members in New York, became AA's national journal by 1945 and later its international journal. Supported by Bill W., the magazine featured first-person stories, AA news, and discussions on key topics like women in AA and veterans returning from war.

Initially intended as a resource for alcoholics worldwide, the Grapevine evolved into a unifying publication for the AA community, chronicling the fellowship's growth, including the creation of the General Service Structure and publication of later editions of the Big Book. The Twelve Traditions were introduced to AA by Bill W. in April 1946 through an article titled "Twelve Suggested Points for AA Tradition". The AA Preamble, inspired by the foreword of the book Alcoholics Anonymous, was written by one of the Grapevine's early editors, Tom. Y., and first appeared in the June 1947 issue. In 1986, the Grapevine was reaffirmed as AA's international journal by the General Service Conference.

== The AA program ==
=== Twelve steps ===
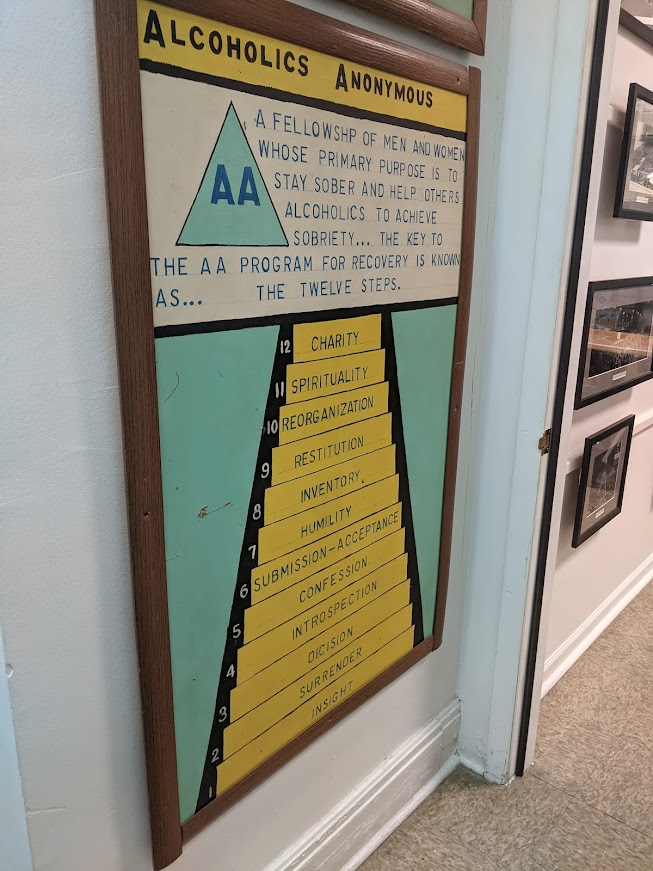
Alcoholics Anonymous Twelve Steps exhibit at AA Intergroup in Akron, Ohio

AA's program extends beyond abstaining from alcohol. Its goal is to effect enough change in the alcoholic's thinking "to bring about recovery from alcoholism" through "an entire psychic change", or spiritual awakening. A spiritual awakening is meant to be achieved by taking the Twelve Steps, and sobriety is furthered by volunteering for AA and regular AA meeting attendance or contact with AA members.

Taking AA's 12 steps are a "suggested", but not required, "program of recovery"—also called a "spiritual solution". They start with members admitting to being "powerless over alcohol" (which the Big Book calls an "illness" or "malady", but never a "disease"), and out of control—for which on going divining and following the will of an unspecified 'higher power' ("God, as we understood Him") could restore one to "sanity". In the steps members acknowledge and make amends and seek to correct personal character defects aided by their higher power for guidance. Those "having achieved a spiritual awakening as a result of these steps" are suggested to carry AA's message to other alcoholics. This is often done through meetings of AA groups as well as with members taking on sponsees, although the Big Book makes no mention of the latter term. While taking care to avoid becoming affiliated, some AA members perform outreach to hospitals, treatment centers and correctional facilities.

==== Sponsorship ====
Members are encouraged to find an experienced fellow alcoholic, called a "sponsor", to help them understand and follow the AA program. The sponsor should preferably have experienced all twelve of the steps, be the same sex as the sponsored person, and should refrain from imposing personal views on the sponsored person. Following the helper therapy principle, sponsors in AA may benefit from their relationship with their charges, as "helping behaviors" correlate with increased abstinence and lower probabilities of binge drinking.

=== Twelve Traditions ===
The Twelve Traditions provide essential guidelines—not rules—that help AA groups navigate their relationships both internally and with the outside world. These traditions ensure that membership is open to anyone seeking to stop drinking, with no dues or fees required. These traditions foster an altruistic, unaffiliated, non-coercive, and non-hierarchical organization, limiting AA's mission to helping alcoholics at a non-professional level while avoiding publicity. To prioritize recovery, the traditions discourage hierarchies, dogma, public controversies, property acquisition, and outside contributions. Members are advised against using AA for personal gain or public prestige, and anonymity is emphasized, particularly in media, with no prescribed consequences for breaches. From a brand management perspective, the Twelve Traditions focuses the organization's messaging and protects it from controversies beyond the scope of its mission to help alcoholics.

=== Meetings ===
==== Overview ====
AA meetings serve as a space where individuals discuss recovery from alcoholism, with flexibility in how meetings are conducted. While AA offers pamphlets suggesting formats, groups have the autonomy to organize their meetings according to their preferences, as long as their decisions do not impact other groups or AA as a whole. Despite cultural differences influencing certain rituals, many elements of AA meetings remain consistent worldwide.

==== Types ====
AA meetings encompass a variety of formats, each designed to serve different needs. Open meetings are accessible to anyone, including non-alcoholics who can attend as observers. In contrast, closed meetings are reserved for individuals who identify as having a desire to stop drinking, a declaration that cannot be questioned by other members. Speaker meetings feature one or more members who share their personal stories of recovery, fostering connection and understanding among participants.

Big Book meetings focus on reading and discussing passages from AA's foundational text, while sharing meetings provide an open platform for members to speak freely and share their experiences, with or without a predetermined topic. AA meetings are gatherings where recovery from alcoholism is discussed. One perspective sees them as "quasi-ritualized therapeutic sessions run by and for, alcoholics".

In recent years, online meetings have become popular, allowing members to connect virtually through platforms like Zoom and What's App. Offline or in-person meetings, often referred to as "brick and mortar" meetings, take place in physical locations, and some groups host hybrid meetings, enabling participants to attend either in person or virtually.

==== Inclusivity & language accessibility ====
Inclusivity is a core principle of AA meetings, which welcome all alcoholics, though some are tailored to specific demographics such as gender, age, profession, or cultural background. Since the mid-1970s, several 'agnostic' or 'no-prayer' AA groups have begun across the US, Canada, and other parts of the world, which hold meetings that adhere to a tradition allowing alcoholics to freely express their doubts or disbelief that spirituality will help their recovery, and these meetings forgo the use of opening or closing prayers.

Meetings in the United States are held in a variety of languages including Armenian, English, Farsi, Finnish, French, Japanese, Korean, Russian, and Spanish.

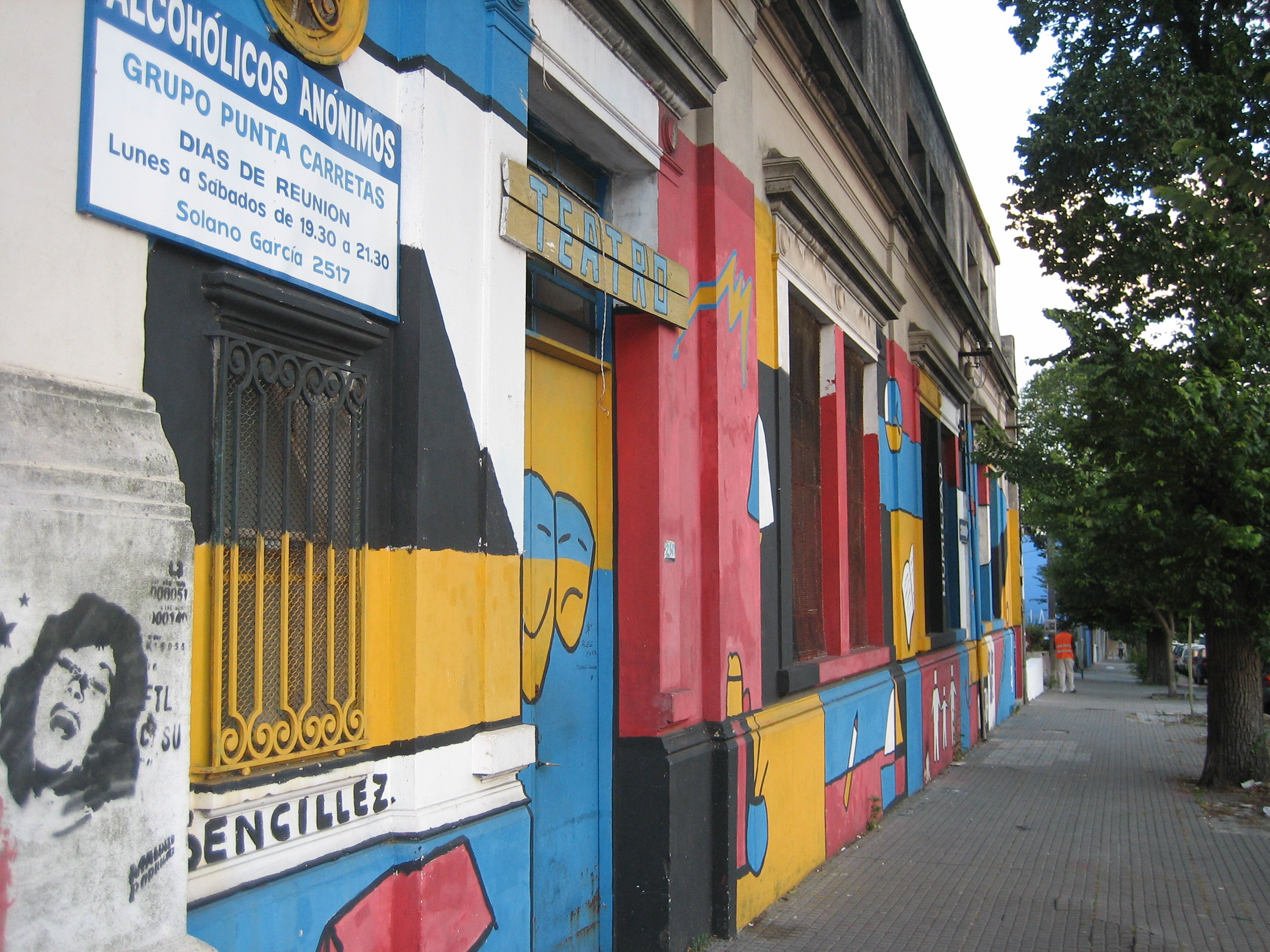
Headquarters of Alcohólicos Anónimos in Montevideo, Uruguay

==== Donations and contributions ====
At some point during the meeting, a basket is passed around for voluntary contributions. AA's 7th tradition requires that groups be "self-supporting, declining outside contributions".

==== Serenity prayer ====
The Serenity Prayer is commonly used in AA meetings as a tool for reflection and guidance. It was called the AA prayer in the 1940s. Often recited at meetings, it emphasizes the concepts of acceptance, courage, and wisdom, which align with the principles of the AA program. The prayer encourages individuals to accept things they cannot change, to find the courage to make changes where possible, and to seek the wisdom to distinguish between the two.

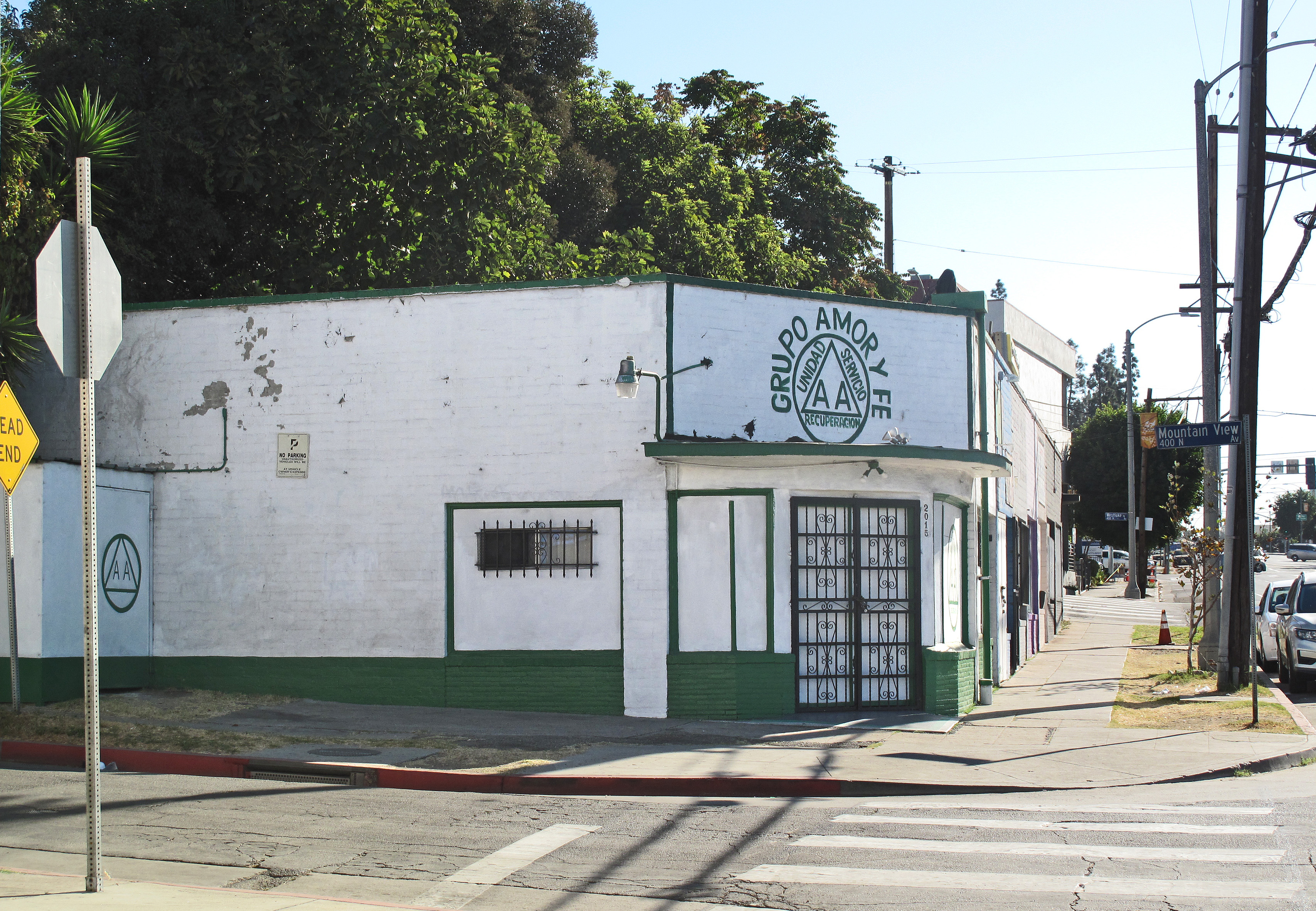
Building for Spanish-speaking AA group in Westlake neighborhood, Los Angeles

=== Sobriety anniversaries and coins ===
Sobriety coins, also known as sobriety chips, are tokens given to members of AA to signify the duration of their sobriety. While the chip system is common, it is not universally adopted across all AA groups. The tradition began with Sister Ignatia in Akron, Ohio, who distributed medallions to newly released patients as reminders to avoid drinking. The actual sobriety chip as known today is believed to have originated in 1942 in Indianapolis, gaining popularity as various AA groups adopted the practice. Typically, different colored chips represent milestones of sobriety within the first year, with tokens awarded for 24 hours, 30 days, 60 days, 90 days, and beyond, culminating in a bronze chip for one year of sobriety.

AA members celebrate Founders Day on the weekend closest to 10 June, marking the anniversary of the organization with thousands of attendees engaging in tours of historical sites, sharing recovery stories, and participating in related activities in Akron, Ohio.

=== Organization and finances ===
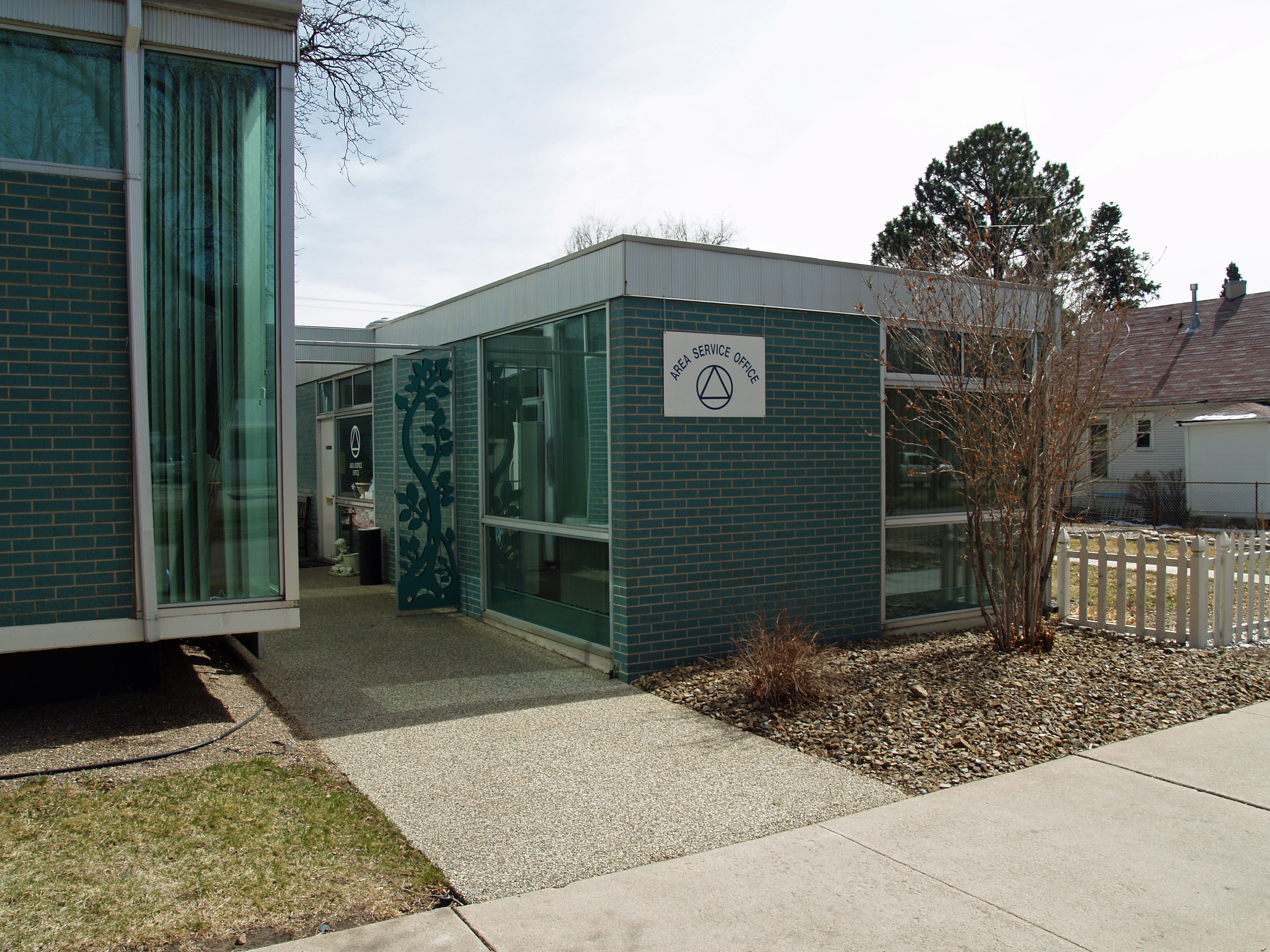
A regional service center for Alcoholics Anonymous

==== Structure and governance ====
AA describes itself as "not organized in the formal or political sense" and has been referred to as a "benign anarchy," borrowing a phrase from anarchy theorist Peter Kropotkin. The Twelve Traditions guide the functioning of individual AA groups, while the Twelve Concepts for World Service outline how the organization operates on a global scale. Each AA group is self-governing, with AA World Services acting only in an advisory capacity. This "inverted pyramid" style of governance has been key to the organization's resilience and adaptability. In Ireland, Shane Butler noted that AA's lack of top-level leadership might make it seem unsustainable, but its structure has proven extremely robust since its establishment there in 1946.

AA's 21-member board of trustees includes seven "nonalcoholic friends of the fellowship," though the organization is primarily served and run by alcoholics. Members who accept service positions, termed "trusted servants," hold these roles for limited terms, typically ranging from three months to two years, depending on the position and group vote. This approach ensures regular rotation and participation from a broad spectrum of members, maintaining AA's commitment to shared responsibility and leadership.

==== Financial structure ====
AA is entirely self-supporting, relying on voluntary contributions from its members to cover expenses. Contributions to the General Service Office (GSO) are limited to $5,000 per member per year. In addition to these contributions, more than 50% of AA's income comes from the sale of AA literature, such as books and pamphlets. This practice aligns with AA's Seventh Tradition, which emphasizes financial independence by not accepting donations from outside individuals or organizations. The Central Office is also fully self-supporting through the sale of literature and member contributions.

==== Employment and service roles ====
The Eighth Tradition permits AA to employ "special workers" for roles that require specific expertise or full-time responsibilities, such as administrative tasks. However, these paid roles do not involve working directly with alcoholics in need of help, a function known as the "Twelfth Step". Calls from alcoholics seeking assistance are always passed on to sober AA members who have volunteered to handle them, ensuring the program remains grounded in its peer-to-peer support model.

==== Organizational operations ====
The AA Central Office coordinates activities such as printing literature, responding to public inquiries, and organizing conferences. It operates independently but ensures alignment with the core principles of the organization. Other International General Service Offices—such as those in Australia, Costa Rica, and Russia—function independently of AA World Services in New York, reflecting AA's decentralized and autonomous structure.

=== Hospitals & institutions ===
Many AA meetings take place in treatment facilities. Carrying the message of AA into hospitals was how the co-founders of AA first remained sober. They discovered great value in working with alcoholics who are still suffering, and that even if the alcoholic they were working with did not stay sober, they did. Bill W. wrote, "Practical experience shows that nothing will so much insure immunity from drinking as intensive work with other alcoholics". Bill Wilson visited Towns Hospital in New York City in an attempt to help the alcoholics who were patients there in 1934. At St. Thomas Hospital in Akron, Ohio, Smith worked with still more alcoholics. In 1939, a New York mental institution, Rockland State Hospital, was one of the first institutions to allow AA hospital groups. Service to corrections and treatment facilities used to be combined until the General Service Conference, in 1977, voted to dissolve its Institutions Committee and form two separate committees, one for treatment facilities, and one for correctional facilities.

In the United States and Canada, AA meetings are held in hundreds of correctional facilities. The AA General Service Office has published a workbook with detailed recommendations for methods of approaching correctional-facility officials with the intent of developing an in-prison AA program. In addition, AA publishes a variety of pamphlets specifically for the incarcerated alcoholic. Additionally, the AA General Service Office provides a pamphlet with guidelines for members working with incarcerated alcoholics.

== Demographics ==
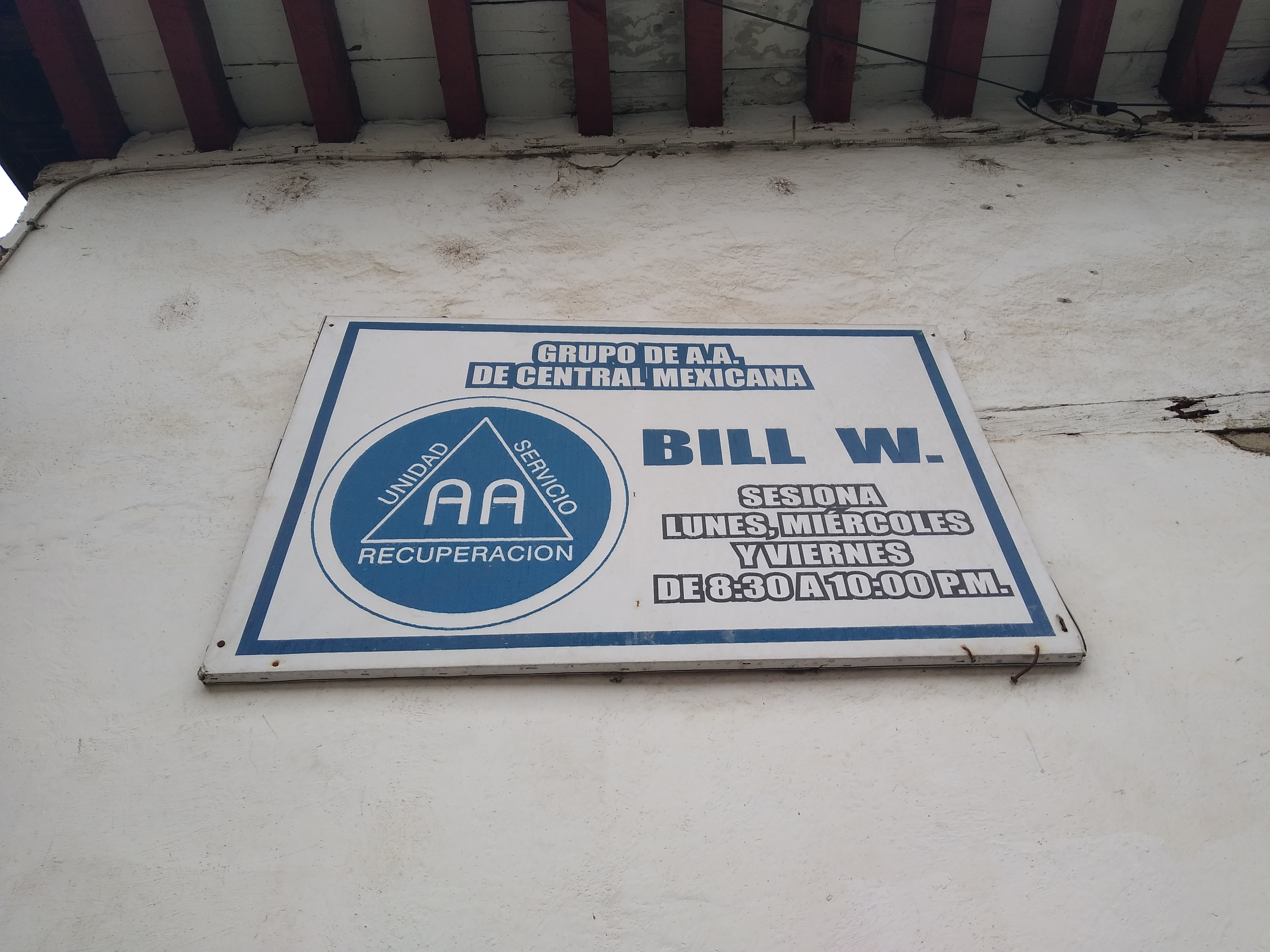
AA group in Pátzcuaro, Michoacán, Mexico

=== 2014 membership survey ===
AA's New York General Service Office survey of over 6,000 members in Canada and the United States concluded that, in North America, AA members who responded to the survey were 62% male and 38% female. The survey found that 89% of AA members were white. Average member sobriety is slightly under 10 years with 36% sober more than ten years, 13% sober from five to ten years, 24% sober from one to five years, and 27% sober less than one year. Before coming to AA, 63% of members received some type of treatment or counseling, such as medical, psychological, or spiritual. After coming to AA, 59% received outside treatment or counseling. Of those members, 84% said that outside help played an important part in their recovery.

The same survey showed that AA received 32% of its membership from other members, another 32% from treatment facilities, 30% were self-motivated to attend AA, 12% of its membership from court-ordered attendance, and only 1% of AA members decided to join based on information obtained from the Internet. People taking the survey were allowed to select multiple answers for what motivated them to join AA.

=== Diversity ===
A 2024 study found that Black, Hispanic, and younger adults are less likely to attend AA meetings compared to white and older adults, with these disparities remaining consistent over time.

== Effectiveness ==
=== Research methodology ===
Because of the anonymous and voluntary nature of AA meetings, medical and social scientists cannot use the most rigorous research designs, such as random assignment to treatment conditions and comprehensive pre- and post-intervention assessment. However, investigators have conducted extensive research on manualized treatment interventions closely aligned with AA principles that encourage regular meeting attendance, such as Twelve Step Facilitation Therapy (AA/TSF). Developers of this treatment intervention argue that since participation in AA constitutes the primary therapeutic ingredient, they can reasonably infer that AA itself is effective, just as cognitive-behavioral therapists argue that cognitive and behavioral therapy techniques (e.g., challenging negative thoughts or avoiding an environment that functions as a conditioned stimulus for alcohol use) are vital therapeutic ingredients in their treatment model, i.e., they are effective interventions by themselves. (Note: AA/TSF proponents stress that research does not prove that AA itself—without the other AA/TSF treatment elements—is just as effective as formal treatment interventions because the research has evaluated AA/TSF effectiveness, not AA effectiveness.) Research comparing AA/TSF to other treatment approaches shows that AA/TSF demonstrates slightly superior outcomes when measuring continuous abstinence and greatly reduced healthcare costs.

=== Outcome measures ===
Several metrics are used to evaluate the success of treatment interventions such as continuous abstinence, drinking frequency, alcohol-related adverse consequences, and healthcare costs.

=== Other effectiveness research findings ===
A 2006 study found a 67% success rate 16 years later for the 24.9% of alcoholics who ended up, on their own, participating actively in AA. However, this may be influenced by self-selection bias. Project MATCH, a 1990s multi-site study, found AA to be more effective than no treatment. Other studies link increased AA attendance with higher spirituality and reduced alcohol consumption.

A 2020 systematic review indicated that manualized AA/TSF therapy (AA participation plus Twelve-Step Facilitation counseling) demonstrated healthcare cost savings and led to higher continuous abstinence rates, compared to other established treatment approaches such as cognitive behavioral therapy. A longitudinal study suggests that LifeRing and SMART Recovery fared worse than AA across several outcomes; however, the effects are insignificant when controlling for the baseline alcohol goal of total abstinence.

==== Patterns of engagement and disengagement ====
The 2001–2002 National Epidemiological Survey on Alcoholism and Related Conditions (NESARC) found that 3.4% of respondents had attended a 12-step meeting. Of those, 988 had ceased attending, 348 continued attending, and 105 were newcomers. These figures help to understand engagement and disengagement patterns within AA.

==== Mechanisms of recovery ====
Although AA claims that spirituality is the primary mechanism for achieving change and recovery, there is growing evidence that suggests this is only true for a minority of AA attendees with a high addiction severity. Instead, AA's beneficial effects are carried predominantly by social, cognitive and affective mechanisms. However, atheist and agnostic people are less likely to initiate and sustain AA attendance in comparison to spiritual and religious people.

=== Criticism ===
The effectiveness of AA, compared to other methods and treatments, was frequently challenged until strong evidence of its efficacy came out in 2020. Lance Dodes, in his 2014 book The Sober Truth, said only five to eight percent of the people who go to one or more AA meetings both achieved continuous sobriety and remained AA members. Dodes' assertion that AA is ineffective was not the consensus of treatment experts of that era. In a 2015 article for The Atlantic, Gabrielle Glaser used Dodes' figures to say AA had a low success rate. Just as with Dodes' assertions, her figures were criticized by experts. One article from 2010 claimed AA was pseudoscientific.

== Philosophical and sociological dimensions ==
AA shares the view that acceptance of one's inherent limitations is critical to finding one's proper place among other humans and God. Such ideas are described as "Counter-Enlightenment" because they are contrary to the Enlightenment's ideal that humans have the capacity to make their lives and societies a heaven on Earth using their own power and reason.

After evaluating AA's literature and observing AA meetings for sixteen months, sociologists David R. Rudy and Arthur L. Greil found that for an AA member to remain sober, a high level of commitment is necessary. This commitment is facilitated by a change in the member's worldview. Rudy and Greil argue that AA is best described as a quasi-religious organization.

== Criticism and controversy ==
=== Zoombombing ===
Zoombombing emerged as a significant challenge for AA meetings during the COVID-19 pandemic, when many groups moved online. Disruptive individuals often infiltrated these virtual meetings, harassing participants and sharing inappropriate content. Some AA members experienced racial hatred. This intrusion undermined the safe, supportive environment essential for recovery, raising concerns about privacy and security. In response, AA groups and Zoom implemented stricter access controls and guidelines to protect participants and maintain a welcoming atmosphere for those seeking help.

=== Disease model ===
Though AA usually avoids the term disease, a few AA publications use the term, e.g., Living Sober, published in 1975, contains several references to alcoholism as a disease, including a chapter urging the reader to "remember that alcoholism is an incurable, progressive, fatal disease".

Bill Wilson explained in 1960 why AA had refrained from using the term disease:

We AAs have never called alcoholism a disease because, technically speaking, it is not a disease entity. For example, there is no such thing as heart disease. Instead, there are many separate heart ailments or combinations of them. It is something like that with alcoholism. Therefore, we did not wish to get in wrong with the medical profession by pronouncing alcoholism a disease entity. Hence, we have always called it an illness or a malady—a far safer term for us to use.

=== 13th-step and sexual advances ===
"Thirteenth-stepping" is a term used to describe a predatory behavior in AA where some individuals exploit vulnerable members for sexual relationships. This can involve unwanted advances and harassment, often targeting newer members who may be more susceptible due to their recovery status.

In 2003, a study in the Journal of Addiction Nursing sampled 55 women in AA and found that 35% of these women had experienced a "pass" and 29% had felt seduced at least once in AA settings. This has also happened with new male members who received guidance from older female AA members pursuing sexual company. The authors suggest that both men and women must be prepared for this behavior or find male or female-only groups.

==== Response ====
As of 2010, women-only meetings are a very prevalent part of AA culture, and AA has become more welcoming for women. AA's pamphlet on sponsorship suggests that men be sponsored by men and women be sponsored by women. AA also has a safety flier which states that "Unwanted sexual advances and predatory behaviors are in conflict with carrying the AA message of recovery".

=== Criticism of culture ===
Stanton Peele argued that some AA groups apply the disease model to all problem drinkers, whether or not they are "full-blown" alcoholics. Along with Nancy Shute, Peele has advocated that besides AA, other options should be readily available to those problem drinkers who can manage their drinking with the right treatment. The Big Book says "moderate drinkers" and "a certain type of hard drinker" can stop or moderate their drinking. The Big Book suggests no program for these drinkers, but instead seeks to help drinkers without "power of choice in drink".

In 1983, a review stated that the AA program's focus on admission of having a problem increases deviant stigma and strips members of their previous cultural identity, replacing it with the deviant identity. A 1985 study based on observations of AA meetings warned of detrimental iatrogenic effects of the twelve-step philosophy and concluded that AA uses many methods that are also used by cults. A later review disagreed, stating that AA's program bore little resemblance to religious cult practices. In 2014, George Eman Vaillant published a paper making the case that Alcoholics Anonymous is not a cult.

=== Spirituality ===
A study found an association between an increase in attendance at AA meetings with increased spirituality and a decrease in the frequency and intensity of alcohol use. The research also found that AA was effective at helping agnostics and atheists become sober. The authors concluded that though spirituality was an important mechanism of behavioral change for some alcoholics, it was not the only effective mechanism. Gabrielle Glaser criticized 12-step programs for being "faith-based", but 12-step programs allow for a very wide diversity of spiritual beliefs, and there are a growing number of secular 12-step meetings.

==== Secular meetings in Toronto controversy ====
In 2011, secular meetings in Toronto, where the 12 steps were altered to remove references to God and prayer, were delisted from the Toronto AA directories. This led to a complaint to the Human Rights Tribunal of Ontario. Mediation resulted in the delisted groups being listed again in 2017.

=== Lawsuits and court rulings ===
==== Privileged communication ====
In the Fifth Step, AA members typically reveal their own past misconduct to their sponsors. US courts have not extended the status of privileged communication, such as physician–patient privilege or clergy–penitent privilege, to communications between an AA member and their sponsor.

==== Court rulings on mandatory attendance ====
United States courts have ruled that inmates, parolees, and probationers cannot be ordered to attend AA. Though AA itself was not deemed a religion, it was ruled that it contained enough religious components (variously described in Griffin v. Coughlin below as, inter alia, "religion", "religious activity", "religious exercise") to make coerced attendance at AA meetings a violation of the Establishment Clause of the First Amendment of the constitution. In 2007, the Ninth Circuit of the US Court of Appeals stated that a parolee who was ordered to attend AA had standing to sue his parole office.

==== Family lawsuit ====
The family of Karla Mendez, who was murdered in 2011 by a man she met at an AA meeting, filed a civil lawsuit in 2012 against AA asserting AA had a "reckless disregard for, and deliberate indifference...to the safety and security of victims attending AA meetings who are repeatedly preyed upon at those meetings by financial, violent, and sexual predators...". The lawsuit against AA was dismissed in 2016.

==== Big Book manuscript case ====
In May 2017, Alcoholics Anonymous World Services Inc. filed a lawsuit in the Supreme Court of the State of New York seeking the return of the original manuscript of the Big Book from its then-owner. AAWS claimed that the manuscript had been given to them as a gift in 1979. This action was criticized by many members of Alcoholics Anonymous since they did not want their parent organization engaged in lawsuits. Alcoholics Anonymous World Services Inc. asked the court to voluntarily discontinue the action in November 2017.

== Notable people who have attended AA ==
While AA emphasizes personal anonymity, many notable individuals have publicly acknowledged their participation in the program for various lengths of time.

Roger Ebert stated he was a member of AA according to a 2009 blog entry he wrote. Eminem has posted pictures of AA Sobriety coins. Anthony Hopkins has credited AA with saving him and marked 48 years of sobriety in 2023. Others who have spoken publicly about their AA attendance include James K. Baxter, Art Carney, Bonnie Raitt, Mychal Judge, Moby, Hank Azaria, Matthew Perry, Jim Irsay, Demi Lovato, Elton John, Tom Waits, Capers Williamson, DJ AM, among others. Some have received pushback and criticism, including Brad Pitt in 2024, from some AA members regarding its anonymity guidelines.

== AA in media and arts ==
=== Film ===
- My Name Is Bill W. – dramatized biography of co-founder Bill Wilson.
- When Love Is Not Enough: The Lois Wilson Story – a 2010 film about the wife of founder Bill Wilson, and the beginnings of Alcoholics Anonymous and Al-Anon.
- Bill W. – a 2012 biographical documentary film that tells the story of Bill Wilson using interviews, recreations, and rare archival material.
- A Walk Among the Tombstones (2014), a mystery/suspense film based on Lawrence Block's books featuring Matthew Scudder, a recovering alcoholic detective whose AA membership is a central element of the plot.
- When a Man Loves a Woman – a school counselor attends AA meetings in a residential treatment facility.
- Clean and Sober – an addict (alcohol, cocaine) visits an AA meeting to get a sponsor.
- Days of Wine and Roses – a 1962 film about a married couple struggling with alcoholism. Jack Lemmon's character attends an AA meeting in the film.
- Drunks – a 1995 film starring Richard Lewis as an alcoholic who leaves an AA meeting and relapses. The film cuts back and forth between his eventual relapse and the other meeting attendees.
- Come Back, Little Sheba – A 1952 film based on a play of the same title about a loveless marriage where the husband played by Burt Lancaster is an alcoholic who gets help from two members of the local AA chapter. A 1977 TV drama was also based on the play.
- I'll Cry Tomorrow – A 1955 film about singer Lillian Roth played by Susan Hayward who goes to AA to help her stop drinking. The film was based on Roth's autobiography of the same name detailing her alcoholism and sobriety through AA.
- You Kill Me – a 2007 crime-comedy film starring Ben Kingsley as a mob hit man with a drinking problem who is forced to accept a job at a mortuary and go to AA meetings.
- Smashed – a 2012 drama film starring Mary Elizabeth Winstead. An elementary school teacher's drinking begins to interfere with her job, so she attempts to get sober in AA.
- Don't Worry, He Won't Get Far on Foot – a 2018 biography/comedy/drama by Gus Van Sant, based on the life of cartoonist John Callahan.
- Doctor Sleep – Released in 2019, Doctor Sleep is a sequel to The Shining, directed by Mike Flanagan and based on Stephen King's work. Ewan McGregor stars as a man who, after overcoming his own demons through AA, helps others do the same.

=== Television ===
- In "Days of Wine and D'oh'ses" (The Simpsons), after watching a video of his drunken antics at his birthday party, Barney resolves to get sober. He attends Alcoholics Anonymous meetings, cleans up his appearance, and attends helicopter-flying lessons. He remains sober by the episode's end, though his alcoholism is replaced by an unhealthy dependence on coffee.
- In "Bloody Mary", a 2005 episode of the animated TV series South Park, Randy Marsh must attend AA meetings after getting a DUI.
- In "The Thirteenth Step", the 13th episode of the 6th season of Criminal Minds, is based on the Twelve-step Program.
- In the Family Guy episode "Friends of Peter G.", Peter and Brian are ordered by a court to attend AA meetings after causing an alcohol-fuelled disruption at a movie theater.
- In CBS' Elementary, Jonny Lee Miller plays an adaptation of Sherlock Holmes who is a recovering drug addict. Several episodes are centered around AA meetings and the process of recovery.

=== Music ===
- Macklemore's song "Faithful" released in October 2022.
- "AA" by American country music singer Walker Hayes.
- The "Twelve-step Suite" is a musical composition by American progressive metal band Dream Theater, with lyrics by drummer Mike Portnoy, himself a recovering addict, inspired by the Twelve-step Program which he himself entered and credits for "saving [his] life". Interpreted by Portnoy as "a concept album spread over five releases", the "Suite" comprises the songs "The Glass Prison" (from Six Degrees of Inner Turbulence), covering steps 1 to 3 of the Program; "This Dying Soul" (Train of Thought), steps 4 and 5; "The Root of All Evil" (Octavarium), steps 6 and 7; "Repentance" (Systematic Chaos), steps 8 and 9; "The Shattered Fortress" (Black Clouds & Silver Linings), steps 10 to 12.
- In 2024, Jelly Roll revealed that an Alcoholics Anonymous meeting served as the inspiration for his new album track, "Winning Streak".

=== Theater ===
- Bill W. and Dr. Bob is a play by Stephen Bergman and Janet Surrey that chronicles the lives of AA founders Bill Wilson and Dr. Robert Smith, and their wives, and has been produced Off-Broadway and in multiple countries since its debut in 2007.

== See also ==
- Adult Children of Alcoholics
- Al-Anon/Alateen
- Calix Society
- Community reinforcement approach and family training (CRAFT)
- Drug addiction recovery groups
- Drug rehabilitation
- Group psychotherapy
- Health benefits of quitting alcohol
- List of twelve-step groups
- Long-term effects of alcohol
- Recovery approach
- Short-term effects of alcohol consumption
- Stepping Stones (house), home of Bill W.
- Washingtonian movement

== Bibliography ==
- Bill W. (1955). "Alcoholics Anonymous: the story of how many thousands of men and women have recovered from alcoholism" (2nd ed.). New York City: Alcoholics Anonymous World Services. OCLC 269381.
- Bill W. (2002). Alcoholics Anonymous: the story of how many thousands of men and women have recovered from alcoholism (4th ed.). New York City: Alcoholics Anonymous World Services. ISBN 978-1-893007-16-1. OCLC 408888189.
- Edwards, Griffith (April 2002). Alcohol: The World's Favorite Drug (1st ed.). Thomas Dunne Books. ISBN 978-0-312-28387-2. OCLC 48176740.
- Mäkelä, Klaus [in Finnish]; et al. (1996). Alcoholics Anonymous as a mutual-help movement: a study in eight societies. World Health Organization. Regional Office for Europe. Madison, WI: University of Wisconsin Press. ISBN 978-0-299-15000-6. OCLC 33242907.
- Mitchel, Dale (2002). Silkworth: the little doctor who loved drunks. Center City, Minn: Hazelden. ISBN 978-1-56838-794-9. OCLC 51063745.
- Pass It on: The Story of Bill Wilson and how the A.A. Message Reached the World. New York: Alcoholics Anonymous World Services. December 1984. ISBN 978-0-916856-12-0. OCLC 12308065.
- Peele, Stanton (1999). The Diseasing of America: how we allowed recovery zealots and the treatment industry to convince us we are out of control. San Francisco: Jossey-Bass. ISBN 978-0-7879-4643-2. OCLC 39605271.
- Questions & Answers on Sponsorship (PDF), Alcoholics Anonymous World Services, Inc, 16 June 2016, archived (PDF) from the original on 25 March 2009
- Robertson, Nan (1988). Getting Better: Inside Alcoholics Anonymous. New York: Morrow. ISBN 978-0-688-06869-1. LCCN 87031153. OCLC 17260252. OL 4127115W.
- Vaillant, George E. (1995). The Natural History of Alcoholism Revisited. Cambridge, Mass: Harvard University Press. ISBN 978-0-674-60377-6. OCLC 31605790.
- Wilcox, D.M. (1998). Alcoholic thinking: Language, culture, and belief in Alcoholics Anonymous. Westport, CT: Greenwood Publishing Group. ISBN 978-0-275-96049-0.
- Kurtz, Ernest (1991). Not-God: a history of Alcoholics Anonymous. Center City, Minn: Hazelden Pittman. ISBN 978-0-89486-065-2.
