= The Natural History of Alcoholism Revisited =

Book by George Eman Vaillant

- Author: George E. Vaillant
- Language: English
- Genre: Medical textbook
- Publisher: Cambridge, Massachusetts: Harvard University Press
- Publication date: 1995
- Publication place: United States
- Media type: Print
- Pages: 462
- ISBN: 0-674-60378-8
- OCLC: 31605790
- Dewey Decimal: 616.86/1 20
- LC Class: RC565 .V332 1995
- Preceded by: The Natural History of Alcoholism: Causes, Patterns, and Paths to Recovery (1983)

The Natural History of Alcoholism Revisited (1995) is a book by psychiatrist George E. Vaillant that describes two multi-decade studies of the lives of 600 American males, non-alcoholics at the outset, focusing on their lifelong drinking behaviours. By following the men from youth to old age it was possible to chart their drinking patterns and what factors may have contributed to alcoholism. Another study followed 100 severe alcoholics from a clinic eight years after their detoxification. The National Review hailed the first edition (1983) as "a genuine revolution in the field of alcoholism research" and said that "Vaillant has combined clinical experience with an unprecedented amount of empirical data to produce what may ultimately come to be viewed as the single most important contribution to the literature of alcoholism since the first edition of AA's Big Book." Some of the main conclusions of Vaillant's book are:

- That alcoholism is as much a social as a medical condition. "Alcoholism can simultaneously reflect both a conditioned habit and a disease."
- Factors predicting alcoholism were related to ethnic culture, alcoholism in relatives, and a personality that is antisocial and extroverted. An unhappy childhood predicted mental illness but not alcoholism—unless the family problems were due to alcoholism.
- That alcoholism was generally the cause of co-occurring depression, anxiety, and sociopathic (delinquent) behaviour, not the result.
- That even though alcoholism is not solely a medical condition, it is therapeutically effective to explain it as a disease to patients. The disease concept encourages patients to take responsibility for their drinking, without debilitating guilt.
- That for most alcoholics, attempts at controlled drinking in the long term end in either abstinence or a return to alcoholism.
- That there is as yet no cure for alcoholism, and that medical treatment can only provide short-term crisis intervention.
- Achieving long-term sobriety usually involves (1) a less harmful, substitute dependency; (2) new relationships; (3) sources of inspiration and hope; and (4) experiencing negative consequences of drinking.

== Background ==
=== Study Samples ===
Core City: In 1940, Sheldon and Eleanour Glueck of Harvard began a major study of juvenile delinquency in teens from Boston — mostly poor kids in tenements, half without a bathtub in their homes. The control group for the study comprised 456 boys who were assessed as non-delinquent. In 1974 this control group, which Vaillant referred to as the Core City sample, was turned over to him to continue research. The Core City group had a mean IQ of 95, and 48% graduated from high school.

College: In 1976 Vaillant inherited another study of more than 200 Harvard sophomores started in 1938—the College sample. The sophomores were white males, selected because they were high achievers and had no known medical or psychological problems. The College sample had a mean IQ of 130, and 76% attended graduate school. Their 1976 mean income was three times that of the Core City group.

The research eventually showed that for the Core City sample at age 60, 36% had abused alcohol at some time in their lives; for the College sample at age 70, the figure was 22%.

The samples were narrow ("male, white, American, and born between 1919 and 1932.") but were followed for a long period. As critics and Vaillant himself pointed out, the samples did not include important segments of the population such as African-Americans and women. Both samples likely excluded those who began abusing alcohol in early adolescence.

The Clinic sample was a group of 100 severe alcoholics who were detoxified at clinic in an urban, municipal hospital (Cambridge Hospital) in Massachusetts during the winter of 1971-1972. The treatment was carried out under what was known as the CASPAR program—Cambridge-Somerville Program for Alcohol Rehabilitation. This group was followed for 8 years to measure the effectiveness of the treatment.

=== Timeline ===
- 1921: mean birth date of College sample
- 1929: mean birth date of Core City sample
- 1938: study on the College sample begins at Harvard
- 1940: Gluecks begin the Core City study
- 1971-2: Clinic study begins
- 1972-4: Vaillant takes over the College and Core City samples.
- 1983: Vaillant publishes The Natural History of Alcoholism: causes, patterns and paths to recovery.
- 1995: Vaillant publishes a new edition entitled The Natural History of Alcoholism Revisited, which includes the entire text of the 1983 edition plus new material marked "Revisited."
- 1996: The 1995 edition is summarized in a paper by Vaillant and Hiller-Sturmhofel entitled “The Natural History of Alcoholism”.
- 2003: Vaillant brings the studies to a close and summarizes results in a 2003 paper entitled "A 60-year follow-up of alcoholic men".

=== Definitions ===
In the 1983 edition of his book, Vaillant required four positive answers to questions on his Problem Drinking Scale (PDS) to indicate alcohol abuse. To diagnose full-blown alcoholism—i.e. alcohol dependence—he used DSM III, which requires either physical tolerance or physiological withdrawal. For the 1995 edition he abandoned the PDS and used the DSM definitions of both abuse and alcoholism.

=== Longitudinal study ===
A longitudinal study is one that follows test subjects over a long period of time — as opposed to a cross-sectional study, which gives a 'snap-shot' of a group at one point in time. Longitudinal studies tend to examine smaller groups in greater detail, whereas cross-sectional studies are often based on a more representative segment of the population over a short time. The longitudinal method was useful in identifying factors in alcoholism, for instance by investigating whether delinquent behaviour started before or after drinking.

=== Prospective study ===
A prospective study is forward-looking and includes subjects who did not originally have symptoms of the disease being studied. Many retrospective, or backward-looking, studies might take a group of alcoholics and try to determine what common traits might have caused their alcoholism. A prospective study takes a group of healthy individuals and tries to predict which ones would become alcoholic based on their histories—a much broader technique that often yields surprising results.

=== Techniques for research on alcoholics ===
Alcoholics present special challenges for researchers because they are good at concealing their drunkenness. Vaillant asserts that "Alcoholics are expert forgetters," have inaccurate memories, and give persuasive denials that manifest "an extraordinary ability to deny the consequences of their drinking." For effective interviews, the subject should first be relatively sober. The interviewer should ask non-threatening, non-judgmental questions that do not challenge the alcoholic's right to drink and that minimise guilt. (Failure to observe these guidelines by medical professionals has likely contributed to alcoholics’ reputation for denial.) Interviewers should ask for objective evidence. For example, if an alcoholic claims that his divorce led to him drinking, the interviewer could ask if the alcoholic's spouse ever complained of his drinking before they split. Interviews and questionnaires should always be backed up with interviews with the subject's family, with consultation of medical records, and with searches in public records for evidence of legal problems associated with drinking.

== Book summary ==
=== Medical or behavioural disorder? ===
A major focus in the book was a comparison of the various definitions of alcoholism:

- the medical model, which focuses on the individual's physical addiction and on symptoms such as ulcers or cirrhosis of the liver;
- the behavioural model, which focuses on alcoholism as an individual choice that may be influenced by environmental factors;
- the sociological model, which focuses on the problems the subject creates in society, such as abuse to family members or arrests for drunk driving; and
- common sense concepts such as "a person is likely an alcoholic if they admit it and have been diagnosed in a clinic."

The first interesting observation was that there is no sharp dividing line between alcoholics and non-alcoholics. The number of drinking problems is spread out along a scale, just like IQ and blood pressure; there is not a cluster of alcoholics at the top end of the scale.

Vaillant compiled indicators of alcoholism from many sources, medical and sociological, and applied them to the Core City drinkers. Possible criteria included

- frequency of intoxication;
- binge drinking;
- complaints from spouses, friends, bosses, or police;
- accidents and legal problems;
- attempts at “going on the wagon”;
- clinical diagnosis;
- admits problems;
- the ‘morning shakes’; and
- health problems.

Statistical techniques were used to determine which, if any, of the criteria were the best indicators of alcoholism. Surprisingly, the answer was that all criteria were of roughly equal importance. No particular indicator or cluster of indicators predominated: it was the number and frequency of problems that best defined alcoholism. More importantly, the medical, sociological, and behavioural criteria were equally reliable (i.e. highly correlated). In other words, it was equally valid to call alcoholism a medical or a behavioural disorder—evidence that doctors and sociologists are indeed talking about the same “unitary disorder”.

There are some grounds, Vaillant argues, for considering alcoholism a medical disease in the most severe cases. As the disorder worsens, conscious choice becomes less and less important and the alcoholic needs medical assistance to detoxify without risk to life (unlike, for example, heroin, which poses less physical danger to addicts going ‘cold turkey’). In this respect, alcoholism resembles coronary heart disease, which starts as ‘voluntary’, unhealthy behaviours such as poor diet and lack of exercise, but ends in a life-threatening medical condition.

=== Causes of alcoholism ===
Public opinion has it that alcoholics drink because they have underlying anxiety, unhappy childhoods, and lack of self-control. However Vaillant's results indicated that some "obvious" causes of alcoholism such as anxiety or unhappy childhoods, were not significant and that the alcoholic personality—self-centered, immature, dependent, resentful, and irresponsible—was not evident until after the subjects had started to abuse alcohol The type of personality found most likely to become alcoholic was antisocial and extroverted, although most antisocial behaviour observed was a result of alcoholism. The presence or absence of childhood environmental strengths predicted which of the College men would take tranquilizers or require medicine for physical complaints, but did not predict alcoholism. Unhappy family environments caused alcoholism only if the unhappy environments were the result of alcoholism in the first place.

The ethnic culture of each man was important. Among the Core City subjects, 61% of whose parents were born in foreign countries, alcoholics were seven times more likely to have Irish than Italian backgrounds. In general, more alcoholics came from countries such as Ireland that prohibited drinking among children but condoned adult drunkenness. Fewer alcoholics came from countries such as Italy that allowed children to drink, especially at meals, and looked down on adult drunkenness.

Alcoholism in ancestors was a factor. Men with several alcohol-abusing ancestors (i.e. not members of immediate family) were twice as likely to become alcoholics as those with none. The presence of an alcoholic parent increased the risk of alcoholism by three times, although it was not clear from the data if the factors were genetic or environmental.

Other miscellaneous factors leading to alcohol dependence included the rapidity with which the alcohol reaches the brain ("gives a high"); jobs such as journalism that encourage drinking because they have no daily structure; drinking behaviour in one's social group; legal availability of alcohol; cost of alcohol; and social stability—in other words medical, environmental, social, and economic factors.

Depression, clinically so often found to occur with alcoholism, was likewise found to be a result of alcoholism. Evidence such as this indicated that alcoholism is not merely a symptom of an underlying disorder, but is an independent disorder in itself.

=== Natural history of alcoholism ===
Contrary to popular conception, alcoholism does not start with the first drink, but usually has a gradual onset over 5 to 15 years of continuous alcohol abuse. One surprise to Vaillant was the number of men who were able to abuse alcohol for decades without becoming dependent. Of 29 alcohol abusers in the College sample, seven men were able to drink heavily for a mean of three decades without showing symptoms of dependence.

The average age of onset of alcohol abuse was 29 years for the Core City men and 41 years for the College men. Full blown alcoholism, where it appeared, usually lasted a decade or two before sobriety was attained. The number of alcoholics increased steadily until age 40 and then began to decline at a rate of stable remission of 2 to 3% per year. Older alcoholics are relatively rare because of the rate of remission and a higher mortality rate.

Seventy-two alcoholics in the Core City sample were successfully followed to age 70. By this age 54% had died, 32% were abstinent, 1% were controlled drinkers, and 12% were still abusing alcohol.

By comparison 19 alcoholics in the College sample were successfully followed to age 70. By this age 58% had died, 21% were abstinent, 10.5% were controlled drinkers, and 10.5% were still abusing alcohol.

On the topic of whether controlled drinking is advisable as a therapeutic goal, Vaillant concluded that "training alcohol-dependent individuals to achieve stable return to controlled drinking is a mirage." Successful return to controlled drinking is possible, just a rare and unstable outcome that in the long term usually ends in relapse or abstinence, especially for the more severe cases. Vaillant tracked two samples within his study group: 21 alcohol abusers who had attained stable abstinence, and 22 who had returned to a stable pattern of controlled drinking. At the end of 15 years of follow-up, in 1995, one of the 21 abstainers had returned to controlled drinking, and one had relapsed. In contrast, of the 22 controlled drinkers 3 became abstinent and 7 relapsed. For the less severe cases, Vaillant concluded that controlled drinking is a worthwhile and valid goal, but "by the time an alcoholic is ill enough to require clinic treatment, return to asymptomatic drinking is the exception not the rule."

=== Clinical Treatment ===
In the Clinic sample, 100 severe alcoholics treated at the clinic were followed for 8 years. The clinic's methods were multi-modal: detoxification and hospital treatment followed by referral to AA. At the end of the 8 years, 34% of subjects had achieved stable abstinence, 29% had died, and 26% were still abusing alcohol, and the evidence was that other clinical studies had reported similar lack of success. Subjects who had a stable social environment or who frequently went to AA meetings had the highest rates of abstinence. Overall, however, treatment other than AA did not significantly improve the subjects’ outcome. In fact Vaillant reports the dismal fact that fully 95% of the Clinic sample had relapsed at some time during the 8-year study period. Vaillant noted that clinical treatment helped only in the short term, as crisis intervention and detox. There was one indicator, a financial one, of short-term success: clinical intervention had significantly reduced the cost of future health care for the alcoholics.

Vaillant's conclusion was that “There is compelling evidence that the results of our treatment were no better than the natural history of the disease.” If clinical treatment had failed to improve on the long-term recovery rates of alcoholics, then what would be the most hopeful route to sobriety?

=== Paths to recovery ===
Research by Vaillant and others found that there were no obvious factors or personality differences to distinguish alcoholics from abstainers; “To a large extent, relapse to and remission from alcoholism remains a mystery.” As was observed in the 1940s in patients with tuberculosis—at that time incurable—recovery depended largely on the patient's own resistance and morale. The same applies to alcoholism, which at present still has no known ‘cure’. As with diabetes, professional help is in training to prevent a relapse and in crisis intervention until patients are strong enough to heal themselves. If natural forces are dominant in the healing process, then treatment should aim to strengthen and support these natural forces, Vaillant argued. The alcoholic needs support in making the required personality change. Thus, achieving long-term sobriety usually involves

1. finding a substitute dependency, such as group attendance;
2. experiencing negative consequences of drinking, such as legal problems or a painful ulcer;
3. new, close relationships and social support;
4. a source of inspiration and hope such as a religious group.

Vaillant argues that an important contribution health professionals can make is to explain alcoholism to patients as a disease, which encourages the patient to take responsibility for their problem without debilitating guilt, in the same way that a diabetic becomes responsible for proper self care when they become aware of their condition.

=== Alcoholics Anonymous ===
Vaillant, who is a non-alcoholic Trustee of AA, made the effectiveness of AA one of the key questions to be investigated in his research. Vaillant argues that AA and other similar groups effectively harness the above four factors of healing and that many alcoholics achieve sobriety through AA attendance. However, he also notes that the “effectiveness of AA has not been adequately assessed” and that “direct evidence for the efficacy of AA… remains as elusive as ever. For example, if an alcoholic achieves sobriety during AA attendance, who is to say if AA helped or if he merely went to AA when he was ready to heal?

In the Clinic sample, 48% of the 29 alcoholics who achieved sobriety eventually attended 300 or more AA meetings, and AA attendance was associated with good outcomes in patients who otherwise would have been predicted not to remit. In the Core City sample the more severe alcoholics attended AA, possibly because all other avenues had failed—after all, AA meetings are rarely attended for hedonistic reasons. The implication from all three samples was simply that many alcoholics find help through AA.

== Book reviews ==
Vaillant’s academic peers saw The Natural History of Alcoholism as “objective, scholarly, and factual,” “wise” and “comprehensive”, an “outstanding and highly recommended text”, and “one of the few [longitudinal studies] and by far the most thorough and scientific.” James Royce wrote that Vaillant "cites innumerable studies and examines opposing viewpoints on every issue," but that this objectivity made the book harder to read for the general reader since the conclusions were difficult to extract.

There were varying opinions on the book's readability. According to David N. Saunders “The book is hard to follow because so much research material is included.” The New York Times advised that the casual reader should skip over most of the technical discussion, whereas The National Review noted only an “occasional thicket of psycho-statistical jargon.”

Royce wrote that Vaillant failed to summarize new (in 1983) research findings on alcohol's interaction with the brain, and that Vaillant had not quoted some notable researchers who have argued for the disease model of alcoholism. Saunders held that more discussion of the treatment issues was needed and noted that many of the measurements made before Vaillant took over the studies were very crude.

Perhaps the sharpest critic of Vaillant's work was controlled drinking proponent Stanton Peele. In a 1983 review in The New York Times, Peele wrote that "The results of this research do not provide ready support for the disease theory of alcoholism. ... [For example, Vaillant] finds strong evidence in the inner city group for sociocultural causality in alcoholism." In his book Diseasing of America Peele claimed that "Vaillant emphatically endorses the disease model... He sees alcoholism as a primary disease... However, Vaillant's claims are not supported by his own data." Other reviewers held the opposite, that Vaillant did not see alcoholism as a disease. Addiction researcher James E. Royce wrote that "Vaillant avoids a simplistic medical model of alcoholism, pointing up instead its complexity as a socio-psycho-biological illness." David N. Saunders of the School of Social Work, Virginia Commonwealth University, wrote that Vaillant "maintains that alcoholism is both a disease and a behaviour disorder." In his summary at the end of the book, Vaillant in fact wrote that "Alcoholism can simultaneously reflect both a conditioned habit and a disease; and the disease of alcoholism can be as well defined by a sociological model as by a medical model."
