= Calix Society =

Catholic recovery group

The Calix Society is an association primarily located the United States that was founded in the 1940s which aims at addressing the particular spiritual needs of Catholics who are affected by alcohol addiction. Calix is open to anyone who wishes to pray for the objectives of Total Abstinence, Spiritual Development, and sanctification of the whole person. Thus family members and anyone affected by other addictions can pray with Calix. It believes in the effectiveness of the twelve-step program, which cannot be practiced effectively unless the affected person admits that they are powerless over the addiction. It is not a recovery centre or a treatment program, which is why anyone still caught up in addiction (not yet recovered) need to find stable sobriety through a rehabilitation centre and/or some 12-step fellowship before they are ready for Calix. Calix proclaims the gospel to the membership of 12 step programs (refer, Story of the Calix Society)3, by enabling Catholics who may have abandoned or neglected their faith during active alcoholism to return and have the fellowship of other Catholics who have recovered. It promotes total abstinence for those who accept that they are powerless over addictions (primarily alcoholism), taking inspiration from Scripture and Catholic Tradition, including Venerable Matt Talbot, and is concerned with the spiritual development and the sanctification of the whole personality of its members. The association's motto is "substituting the cup that stupifies for the cup that sanctifies". The association has expanded since the 1940s to many other countries outside of the US, including the UK, and Australia.

== History ==
The Calix Society was founded in Minneapolis in 1947. According to the society's national chaplain, it began when five laymen from the Minneapolis area asked for a daily early-morning Mass to be offered for a priest who was struggling with alcoholism. After several weeks the priest was able to stay sober and the group that formed around the effort became Calix. A local Catholic newspaper reports that the founding group came from St. Stephen parish in Minneapolis and first met at a café in the city's Uptown area. The name calix is Latin for "chalice".

== See also ==
- Addiction recovery groups
- Al-Anon/Alateen
- Community reinforcement approach and family training
- Drug rehabilitation
- Effectiveness of Alcoholics Anonymous
- Group psychotherapy
- Intervention (counseling)
- List of twelve-step groups
- Recovery approach
- Self-help groups for mental health
- Stepping Stones (house)
- Substance abuse
- Washingtonian movement
