= Andrew Tatarsky =

American psychologist (born 1955)

- Born: August 11, 1955 (age 71); New York City, United States
- Education: City College of the City University of New York
- Occupations: Founder and director of Center for Optimal Living; clinical psychologist; author
- Known for: Work in psychotherapy, substance use disorders, and addictive behavior
- Notable work: Harm reduction psychotherapy

Andrew Tatarsky (born August 11, 1955) is an American psychologist and the founder and director of the Center for Optimal Living. He teaches in New York City as the Professor of Professional Practice for the Harm Reduction Psychotherapy Certificate Program at the New School for Social Research. Tatarsky is known for developing Integrative Harm Reduction Therapy (IHRP), a treatment for the spectrum of substance use disorders and other high-risk behaviors.

== Education ==
Tatarsky attended the City College of New York, where he graduated with Research Honors in psychology, summa cum laude in 1977. At the City College of New York he was elected member of Phi Beta Kappa society and received the Bernard A. Ackerman Research Award. He received his Ph.D. in clinical psychology from the City College of the City University of New York in 1986.

== Career ==
Early in his career, Tatarsky served as the Clinical Director and Senior Psychotherapist at The DiMele Center for Psychotherapy, where he directed a cocaine consultation service. Simultaneously, in his private practice Tatarsky began to work with psychotherapy clients who were actively using substances, finding his clients to be staying in treatment and improving. These experiences served as the foundation for his criticism of the abstinence based model for substance use treatment, the limitation of the disease model of addiction, and his development of Harm Reduction Psychotherapy.

Later in his career Tatarsky would become a founding member and past president of the Division on Addiction of New York State Psychological Association. And a founding board member of the Association for Harm Reduction Therapy. He is a member of the board of Moderation Management Network, Inc. And has served as a clinical advisor to the New York State Office of Alcoholism and Substance Abuse Services. Tatarsky is currently a consultant in the Advanced Specialization in Couple and Family Therapy at the Postdoctoral Program in Psychotherapy and Psychoanalysis at New York University

== Works ==
- Tatarsky, A. (Ed.). (2007). Harm Reduction Psychotherapy: A New Treatment for Drug and Alcohol Users. Northvale, N.J., Aronson.
- Tatarsky, A. (2010). Developing your healthiest relationship to marijuana: A harm reduction approach. In: Holland, J. The Pot Book. A Comprehensive Look at the Risks and Benefits of Cannabis. Rochester, VT, Inner Traditions.
- Tatarsky, A. & Marlatt, G.A. (2010). State of the Art in Harm Reduction Psychotherapy: An Emerging Treatment for Substance Misuse. Journal of Clinical Psychology: In Session, Vol. 66 (10), pp. 117–122.

== See also ==
- Alan Marlatt
- Harm reduction
