= Project MATCH =

Project MATCH began in 1989 in the United States and was sponsored by the National Institute on Alcohol Abuse and Alcoholism (NIAAA). MATCH is an initialism for Matching Alcoholism Treatments to Client Heterogeneity. The project was an 8-year, multi site, $27-million investigation that studied which types of alcoholics respond best to which forms of treatment. MATCH studied whether treatment should be uniform or assigned to patients based on specific needs and characteristics. The programs were administered by psychotherapists and, although twelve-step methods were incorporated into the therapy, actual Alcoholics Anonymous meetings were not included. Three types of treatment were investigated:

- Cognitive Behavioral Coping Skills Therapy, focusing on correcting poor self-esteem and distorted, negative, and self-defeating thinking.
- Motivational Enhancement Therapy, which helps clients to become aware of and build on personal strengths that can help improve readiness to quit.
- Twelve-Step Facilitation Therapy administered as an independent treatment designed to familiarize patients with the AA philosophy and to encourage participation.

The study concluded that patient-treatment matching is not necessary for alcoholism treatment because the three techniques are equal in effectiveness.

== Critics ==
Cutler and Fishbain, in a review of Project MATCH, stated that in out of more than 60 publications generated by Project MATCH, all have overlooked important results.

Dr. Stanton Peele criticized MATCH on the basis that there was no control group (a group selected specifically for non treatment) to determine whether the treatments were more effective than the natural recovery process. Therapists in MATCH were more highly trained and monitored than addiction counselors usually available to the public. Effectiveness for all treatments was measured by reduction in frequency and intensity of drinking, whereas twelve-step and abstention-based programs, he argued, should claim no improvement without full abstention. Peele states Project MATCH's failure to confirm a matching hypothesis (Note: For this sense of the term matching hypothesis, see Prevention and treatment of alcohol problems: Research opportunities. 1990. p. 149f. doi:10.17226/1486. ISBN 978-0-309-04182-9. PMID 25144095.) revealed oversights in their methods, as well as showing that American conceptions of alcoholism and treatment policy are fundamentally wrong. Research outside the United States has shown that subjective matching does work and other research shows that many with alcohol use disorder problems heal on their own without treatment.

George Vaillant argues researchers need to examine differences between alcoholics who succeed in recovering and those who fail, rather than limiting themselves to a search for contrasts among professionally run treatments.

Project MATCH was poorly designed "to say the least" asserts psychologist G. Alan Marlatt of the University of Washington in Seattle, a pioneer in the development of behavioral treatments for alcohol use disorder. Marlatt states: "Everybody can now project their own views about alcoholism onto this study."
