= Bankole Johnson =

Nigerian psychiatrist

Bankole A. Johnson
- Born: 5 November 1959 (age 66); Nigeria
- Education: University of London (M.B.B.S.); University of Glasgow (Ph.D., Medicine)
- Occupations: Psychiatrist, neuroscientist
- Awards: Governors Award (Emmy Award, for HBO Addiction)

Bankole A. Johnson (born 5 November 1959) is a Nigerian psychiatrist. He served as Alumni Professor and Chairman of the Department of Psychiatry and Neurobehavioral Sciences at the University of Virginia and is known for his research into addiction.

Johnson's primary area of research expertise is the psychopharmacology of medications for treating addictions, and he is well known in the field for his discovery that topiramate, a gamma-aminobutyric acid (GABA) facilitator and glutamate antagonist, is an effective treatment for alcoholism. Johnson also received national media attention for his appearance in the Home Box Office (HBO) original documentary feature, "Addiction", which won a Governors Award, a special Emmy Award, from the Academy of Television Arts and Sciences.

== Biography ==
Johnson was born on 5 November 1959 in Nigeria. Johnson attended King's College in Lagos, Nigeria and received his diploma in 1975. He then went on to Davies' College in Sussex, England followed by the Institute Catholique de Paris in Paris, France. Johnson graduated from the University of Glasgow in Scotland in 1982 with a Medicinae Baccalaureum et Chirurgie Baccalaureum degree. He went on to train in psychiatry at the Royal London and Maudsley and Bethlem Royal Hospitals, and to train in research at the Institute of Psychiatry (University of London). In 1991, Johnson graduated from the University of London with a Master of Philosophy degree in neuropsychiatry. Johnson conducted his doctoral research at Oxford University and obtained a doctorate degree in medicine, Medicinae Doctorem, from the University of Glasgow in 1993. Most recently, in 2004, Johnson earned his Doctor of Science degree in medicine from the University of Glasgow – the highest degree that can be granted in science by a British university.

Johnson joined the faculty at the University of Texas Health Science Center in Houston in 1993 and later became the Deputy chairman for Research and Chief of the Division of Alcohol and Drug Addiction in the Department of Psychiatry at the University of Texas Health Science Center in San Antonio in 1998. In 2001, Johnson received the Dan Anderson Research Award from the Hazelden Foundation for his "distinguished contribution as a researcher who has advanced the scientific knowledge of addiction recovery." In 2002, Johnson received the Distinguished Senior Scholar of Distinction Award from the National Medical Association. Johnson was inducted into the Texas Hall of Fame in 2003 for his contributions to science, mathematics, and technology. On 1 September 2004, Johnson accepted an appointment to serve as Alumni Professor and Chairman of the Department of Psychiatric Medicine at the University of Virginia. Johnson became a fellow of the Royal College of Psychiatrists in 2007. In 2009 Johnson was named associate editor of the editorial board of The American Journal of Psychiatry, and from 2010 to 2011 he served as field editor-in-chief of Frontiers in Psychiatry.

In 2019, Johnson received the R. Brinkley Smithers award from the American Association of Addiction Medicine.

== Research ==
Johnson's research focus is on the neuropsychopharmacology of addiction. His work integrates the neuroscience and behavioural aspects of addiction medicine with the goal of formulating a more thorough understanding of the basis of drug-seeking behaviour and developing effective treatments. Central to his research is the role of and interaction between midbrain monoamine systems with a focus on serotonin, gamma-aminobutyric acid (GABA)/glutamate and dopamine.

Johnson's Journal of the American Medical Association (JAMA) paper, titled "Topiramate for treating alcohol dependence: a randomized controlled trial" and published in 2007, gained national and international media attention. The 14-week US multi-site clinical trial involved 371 male and female alcoholics. Those patients taking topiramate had reduced heavy drinking and showed better results with lowering cholesterol, body mass index, liver enzymes, and blood pressure than those taking the placebo. The study results were featured on Reuters, MSNBC, CBS, ABC, CNN, Fox News, USA Today, the Associated Press, and many other media outlets.

Johnson’s current research involves clinical trials and human laboratory studies, and includes neuroimaging and molecular genetics. He now incorporates neuroimaging evaluations into his drug interaction studies to identify the site-specific effects of abused drugs and to evaluate the effectiveness of potential medications for the treatment of addiction. Current studies include a clinical trial aimed at determining the effectiveness of ondansetron, a serotonin-3 antagonist, for the treatment of subtypes of alcoholics, as well as a human laboratory project trying to elucidate the effects of naltrexone and acamprosate on hepatic and renal function in alcohol-dependent individuals.

== Honors and awards ==
- Inductee, Texas Hall of Fame for Science, Mathematics and Technology, 2003
- Appointed to the National Advisory Council for NIH/NIDA, 2004 – 2007
- Member, Medications Development Subcommittee of NIDA's Advisory Council on Drug Abuse, 2004 – 2007
- Member, Extramural Advisory Board for NIH/NIAAA, 2004 – present
- Member, Medications Development Scientific Advisory Board for NIH/NIDA, 2005 – 2009
- American Psychiatric Association Distinguished Psychiatrist Lecturer Award, 2006 (for outstanding achievement in the field of psychiatry as an educator, researcher, and clinician)
- NIH Roadmap Consultant, 2006 – present
- Listed in "Best Doctors in America", 2007, 2009–2010
- Fellow, Royal College of Psychiatrists, 2007 – present
- Distinguished Fellow, American Psychiatric Association, 2008 – present
- American Psychiatric Association, Solomon Carter Fuller Award, 2009
- Fellow, American College of Neuropsychopharmacology, 2010 – present
- Jack Mendelson Award, NIAAA – 2013
