= Stanton Peele =

American psychologist

Stanton Peele (born January 8, 1946) is an American psychologist, attorney, psychotherapist, and author who has written on alcoholism, addiction, and addiction treatment.

== Career ==
Raised in Philadelphia, Pennsylvania, Peele received his B.A. in political science cum laude on municipal and state scholarships from the University of Pennsylvania in 1967. Supported by a number of fellowships (including the Woodrow Wilson Fellowship), he went on to earn a Ph.D. in social psychology from the University of Michigan in 1975. From 1976 to 2012, he maintained a private practice and consultancy while based in Morristown, New Jersey.

After earning his J.D. from the Rutgers School of Law – Newark in 1997, Peele was admitted to the New York and New Jersey bars. He maintained a concurrent law practice (including two stints as a pool attorney in the Morris County Public Defender's Office that offered vital insights into the workings of the American criminal justice system) until 2012. As a psychologist and addiction specialist, he has held visiting and adjunct academic positions at New York University (adjunct clinical professor; 2003–2007), Bournemouth University (visiting professor; 2003–2010), and The New School (adjunct professor; 2004–2010). He currently resides in Brooklyn, New York.

Peele inaugurated the Life Process Program (LPP) as a residential treatment program in Iowa from 2008 to 2011.

Peele is the author of fourteen books, including Love and Addiction (1975), The Meaning of Addiction (1985/1998), Diseasing of America (1989), The Truth about Addiction and Recovery (with Archie Brodsky and Mary Arnold, 1991), Resisting 12-Step Coercion (with Charles Bufe and Archie Brodsky, 2001), 7 Tools to Beat Addiction (2004), Addiction-Proof Your Child (2007), Recover! Stop Thinking Like an Addict (with Ilse Thompson, 2014), Outgrowing Addiction: With Common Sense Instead of "Disease" Therapy (with Zach Rhoads, 2019), and his memoir, A Scientific Life on the Edge: My Lonely Quest to Change How We See Addiction (2021), as well as 250 other professional publications.

== Addiction ==
Peele began his critique of standard notions of addiction when he published Love and Addiction (coauthored with Archie Brodsky). According to his experiential/environmental approach, addictions are negative patterns of behavior that result from an over-attachment people form to experiences generated from a range of involvements. He contends that most people experience addiction to some degree at least for periods of time during their lives. He does not view addictions as medical problems but as "problems of life" that most people overcome. The failure to do so is the exception rather than the rule, he argues. This view opposes the brain disease model of addiction. Peele has used the term life-process model of addiction to describe this model, as originated and advocated in his 1991 book The Truth About Addiction and Recovery written with Archie Brodsky and Mary Arnold.

In his books on non-addictive child rearing, Addiction-Proof Your Child (2007) and Outgrowing Addiction (with child development specialist Zach Rhoads, 2019), Peele argues that the best antidote for addiction is raising independent children who are competent and who have pro-social, health-oriented values. These same profiles, along with socially privileged backgrounds, account for which young people are able to overcome whatever addictive episodes they have.

In a number of papers, as well as his 1989 book, Diseasing of America: Addiction Treatment Out of Control, Peele has argued that treatment, including as ideally administered in Project MATCH, is an inadequate, even iatrogenic, cultural response to addiction. This is particularly true, he finds, for disease treatments, since they diminish people's sense of themselves and their ability to change.

When it was published in 1975, Love and Addiction pre-dated by almost a decade the notion of sex addiction and codependency popularized by authors such as Patrick Carnes, whose Out of the Shadows, one of the earliest popular books to describe sex addiction, came out in 1983, and Melody Beattie, whose Codependent No More was published in 1986. Love and Addiction pre-dated the current popular use of the terms "sex addiction" and "codependency" to describe disorders of love attachment, as these terms were not part of Peele and Brodsky's nomenclature. However, because Love and Addiction was concerned with observing the same condition of addictive human attachments, it has been argued that this was the first book to be written on the subject of codependent relationships.

In reviewing the legacy of Love and Addiction, psychologist Dr. Alex Kwee wrote:

"That experiences can be addictive was a prescient notion in 1975 as psychology now embraces the concept of the process (or behavioral) addictions such as pathological gambling, compulsive eating, and sex addiction. But it must surely be to Peele's dismay that instead of rethinking substance addiction as a medical illness, psychology has gone and classified the behaviors as addictions in the same medical sense and yielded the solution into the hands of the 12-Steps."

== Views on Alcoholism ==
Peele maintains that, depending on the person, abstinence or moderation is a valid approach to treat excessive drinking. In a Psychology Today article that compared the Life Process Program with the disease model, he also argues against the theory proposed decades ago by modern physicians, mental health professionals, research scientists, etc. that addiction is a disease. In Diseasing of America (1989), Peele contested Dr. George Vaillant's pro-disease treatise The Natural History of Alcoholism.

Peele has been concerned with identifying cultural factors (those differentiating Temperance from non-Temperance societies) in support of positive alcohol experiences, as well as medical, and psychological benefits due to positive drinking practices. Primarily, he has found, such drinking occurs where alcohol use is socialized in young people in family and community settings. He has also sought to generalize this paradigm to drug use.

== Views on 12 step/disease treatment ==
In a co-authored book, Resisting 12 Step Coercion (2001), Peele outlined his case against court-mandated attendance of twelve-step drug and alcohol treatment programs. He argued that these treatment programs are useless and sometimes harmful; he presented research on alternative treatment options, and accused some addiction providers of routine violation of standard medical ethics, an accusation that is likewise often leveled at Peele by disease proponents.

In The Truth About Addiction and Recovery (1991) and 7 Tools to Beat Addiction (2004), Peele laid out what he believes to be the elements of alternative treatment. He developed these ideas as the Life Process Program, which was the basis for a non-12 Step residential treatment program and is now offered as an online treatment resource by Dr. Peele and colleagues.

Peele attributes the intensifying drug crisis in the US to the continuing acceptance and spread of the disease model of addiction in both its 12-step and brain disease forms since, he feels, the disease model undercuts the sense of self-efficacy that characterizes positive, controlled substance use.

== Criticism ==
In a review of The Meaning of Addiction, addiction researcher Dr. Griffith Edwards stated the following about Peele's work:

"With these and other issues treated in cavalier fashion, with referencing highly incomplete and crucial work often ignored, one begins to feel that this is a book where polemic and scholarship have become inextricably and unhappily mixed. [...] Peele is not only a psychologist of distinction, but someone who can make use of sociological and biological ideas. [...] So there's the dilemma."

— Griffith Edwards, Review of The Meaning of Addiction.

== Recognition ==
Nick Heather, PhD and Emeritus Professor of Alcohol & Other Drug Studies at Northumbria University, and co-editor of the book Evaluating the Brain Disease Model of Addiction commented:

Stanton Peele has done as much as anyone to reveal the inadequacies, absurdities, and injustices of the idea that addiction is a disease and, specifically, that it is a disease of the brain. In a constant flow of influential books, articles, and blogs over more than forty years, he has persuasively extended the critique of the disease theory of addiction beyond the scientific community to the general public. When the disease theory is eventually replaced by a more rational and humane approach in the popular understanding of addiction, Stanton Peele will be first in line to receive the plaudits, and those of us who broadly share his view will owe him a profound debt of gratitude.

- 1989: Rutgers Center of Alcohol Studies Mark Keller Award for Alcohol Studies for his article "The limitations of control-of-supply models for explaining and preventing alcoholism and drug addiction," JSA, 48:61-77, 1987.
- 1994: Alfred R. Lindesmith Lifetime Achievement Award for Scholarship from the Drug Policy Foundation, Washington, DC,
- 1998: Creation of the Annual Stanton Peele Lecture, 1998, by the Addiction Studies Program, Deakin University, Melbourne, Australia.
- 2006: Lifetime Achievement Award, 2006, International Network on Personal Meaning, Vancouver.

== Funding ==
Lindesmith Center (now the Drug Policy Alliance): grant to write an adolescent drug guide (1996).

The Distilled Spirits Council of the United States (DISCUS) and the Wine Institute provided unrestricted grants for research used in the journal article Exploring Psychological Benefits Associated with Moderate Alcohol Use: A Necessary Corrective to Assessments of Drinking Outcomes?
