= Nick Heather =

British clinical psychologist (1938–2025)

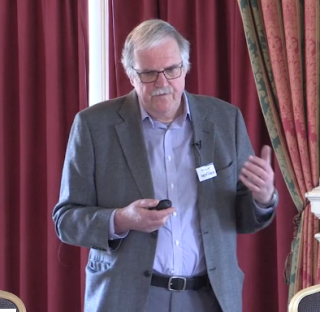
- Born: June 1938; London, England
- Died: 28 January 2025 (aged 86)
- Education: University College London, University of Leeds, University of Dundee
- Known for: addiction psychology
- Scientific career
- Fields: Clinical psychology
- Workplaces: University of New South Wales, Northumbria University
- Thesis: The structure of delinquent values: an empirical test of sociological theories of delinquent values using repertory grid methodology (1979)

Brian "Nick" Heather (June 1938 – 28 January 2025) was a British clinical psychologist, alcohol researcher and academic who was emeritus Professor of Alcohol & Other Drug Studies at Northumbria University. He was one of the pioneers of brief intervention techniques to reduce alcohol misuse, and challenged the disease theory of alcoholism and had over five hundred research publications and books.

== Background ==
Nick Heather was born in London in June 1938, and was the son of an off-license manager. Born and still officially named Brian Heather, in an interview for the Journal Addiction he explained after his birth his father remarked he looked like "old Nick" due to thick black hair. In his late teens he joined the Royal Air Force under one of the last phases of National Service, posted mostly in Germany. After various jobs he decided he would take A-levels by correspondence course in an attempt to go to University and in 1965 he received a degree in Psychology and Statistics from University College London, followed by MSc at the University of Leeds and PhD at the University of Dundee.

In 1976 his first book was published 'Radical Perspectives in Psychology', which critiqued psychiatry and some of the academic approaches to psychology at the time.

Heather died on 28 January 2025, at the age of 86.

== Challenging the disease model of 'alcoholism' ==
Heather had a number of books published which present evidence and theories that intend to disprove the notion that alcoholism exists as a disease. In 1981 he co-authored a book on controlled drinking, which looked at a number of studies that found some dependent drinkers were able to return to problem free drinking. In 1997 Heather's co-authored book 'Problem Drinking' was published by Oxford Medical Publications. The book extensively explored alcohol problems and their interpretation through various research and debate, repeatedly setting out evidence to contest disease model interpretations of alcohol problems.

As well as evidence of controlled drinking in some formerly dependent drinkers, a wide variety of other evidence is set out to contest the disease model. One strong theme of the book is the complexity of alcohol problems, whereby dependence itself can vary greatly in severity. As such, Heather argues that there is no hard and fast line between 'alcoholics' and 'non-alcoholics', so the concept is inherently flawed. Also argued are that many people who do indeed develop alcohol dependence do recover, often spontaneously or without subscribing to any formal support. Dependence does not also mean an inevitable progression into worsening addiction and ultimately 'rock bottom', as is often claimed by disease model advocates.

In a 2007 interview with the Addiction Journal, Heather stated he was "depressed by the resurgence of the notion that there is something called ‘alcoholism’ which is a brain disease", which had "held us back from a proper understanding of alcohol problems and how they may be resolved in all kinds of ways". In 2022 a book 'Evaluating the Brain Disease Model of Addiction' was released, edited by Heather and others. The book includes a range of contributions arguing for and against understanding addiction via a brain disease model.

Heather was also instrumental in establishing the New Directions in the Study of Alcohol Group (NDSAG) in the 1970s, which allowed those working in the addictions field to come together to discuss and challenge notions such as the disease model. He was Honorary President of the Group, which held its 40th annual conference in 2016.

== The development of brief interventions ==
The delivery of brief intervention for non-dependent drinkers is a key alcohol public health policy in many countries across the globe. Although some literature credits the early development of brief intervention to the United States, its true origins go back to the Scottish Highlands through work by Heather and colleagues.

By the 1980s Heather was becoming an experienced alcohol researcher, specifically focusing on work relating to 'controlled drinking'. In part, brief interventions came about because of difficulties recruiting dependent drinkers for studies meant he and colleagues sought other participants out through primary care. Heather collaborated with the Scottish Health Education Group to produce a screening and intervention pack for general practitioners called DRAMS (Drinking Responsibly and Moderately with Self-control). He stated the Scottish Health Education Group was an important and innovative group in the 1970s and 1980s but was closed down by the government for criticising government policy.

Although other researchers later delivered some of the research trials that more convincingly proved the effectiveness of brief intervention approaches, Heather continued to play a significant and influential role in their continued development including involvement in many further research trials and journal articles.

== Publications ==
Heather produced more than 500 publications, mainly peer-reviewed journal articles and a number of book titles. Later he co-edited 'Addiction & Choice: rethinking the relationship' with Gabriel Segal, which includes a number of chapters by leading experts in the addiction field. The book explores a 'multidisciplinary perspective from philosophy, neuroscience, psychiatry, psychology and the law, demonstrating to readers how diverse positions from varying academic and scientific disciplines can cohere to form a radically new perspective on addiction'.

== Jellinek Memorial Award ==
In 2017 Heather was awarded the Jellinek Memorial Award. The award, in honour of E.M Jellinek, is an international award presented to scientists who have made an outstanding contribution to the advancement of knowledge in the alcohol addiction field.
