= Disease model of addiction =

Description of an addiction as a disease

The disease model of addiction describes an addiction as a disease with genetic, biological, neurological or environmental origin. The traditional medical model of disease requires only an abnormal condition causing distress, discomfort or dysfunction to an affected individual. The contemporary medical model partly attributes addiction to changes in the brain's mesolimbic pathway. The model also considers these diseases as a result of other biological, psychological or sociological entities, despite an incomplete understanding of their mechanisms. The common biomolecular mechanisms underlying addiction – CREB and ΔFosB – were reviewed by Eric J. Nestler in a 2013 review. Genetics and mental disorders may precipitate the severity of a drug addiction. It is estimated that 50% of healthy individuals developing an addiction can trace the cause to genetic factors.

== Criticism ==
However, the model does not come without criticisms. Critics of the model, especially those subscribed to the life-process model of addiction, believe that labelling people as addicts prevents them from developing self-control and due to social stigmas. As noted by harm reduction specialist Andrew Tatarsky:

The essence of this model is the pragmatic recognition that treatment must meet active substance users ‘‘where they are’’ in terms of their needs and personal goals. Thus, harm reduction approaches embrace the full range of harm-reducing goals including, but not limited to, abstinence.

== See also ==
- Addiction psychology
