= Unconditional positive regard =

Concept in psychotherapy

Unconditional positive regard, a concept initially developed by Stanley Standal in 1954, later expanded and popularized by the humanistic psychologist Carl Rogers in 1956, is the basic acceptance and support of a person regardless of what the person says or does, especially in the context of client-centred therapy. Rogers wrote:

For me it expresses the primary theme of my whole professional life, as that theme has been clarified through experience, interaction with others, and research. This theme has been utilized and found effective in many different areas until the broad label 'a person-centred approach' seems the most descriptive. The central hypothesis of this approach can be briefly stated. It is that the individual has within him or her self vast resources for self-understanding, for altering her or his self-concept, attitudes, and self-directed behaviour—and that these resources can be tapped if only a definable climate of facilitative psychological attitudes can be provided.

== History ==
The concept of unconditional positive regard was developed by Carl Rogers in 1956, expanding on the earlier (1954) work of Stanley Standal. During this time, Rogers was working as a clinical psychologist with children at a mental health clinic in Rochester, New York. While working at the clinic, Rogers became influenced by Jessie Taft, a social worker who believed that the relationship between the therapist and the patient was the most influential part of treatment. This appealed to Rogers and led to his development of client-centered therapy. Client-centered therapy requires four characteristics of the therapist in order to promote the highest level of growth. These include empathy, unconditional positive regard, congruence, and attitude versus technique. Rogers defined unconditional positive regard by individually explaining the key elements of the term. He explained that unconditional means, "No conditions of acceptance...It is at the opposite pole from a selective evaluating attitude." He wrote that positive means, "A warm acceptance of the person. A genuine caring for the client." In reference to regard he wrote that, "One regards each aspect of the client's experience as being part of that client. It means a caring for the client, but not in a possessive way or in such a way as simply to satisfy the therapist's own needs. It means caring for the client as a separate person, with permission to have his [or her] own feelings, his [or her] own experiences." In Roger's book, On Becoming A Person, Rogers cites Stanley Standal as the source of the theory of unconditional positive regard.

== Application ==
Rogers believed that unconditional positive regard is essential for healthy development and tried to establish it as a therapeutic component. Through providing unconditional positive regard, humanistic therapists seek to help their clients accept and take responsibility for themselves. Humanistic psychologists believe that by showing the client unconditional positive regard and acceptance, the therapist is providing the best possible conditions for personal growth to the client.

By definition, it is essential in any helping relationship to have an anticipation for change. In the counseling relationship, that anticipation presents as Hope—an optimism that something good and positive will develop to bring about constructive change in the client's personality. Thus, unconditional positive regard means that the therapist has and shows overall acceptance of the client by setting aside their own personal opinions and biases. The main factor in unconditional positive regard is the ability to isolate behaviors from the person who displays them.

David G. Myers says the following in his textbook, Psychology: Eighth Edition in Modules:

People also nurture our growth by being accepting—by offering us what Rogers called unconditional positive regard. This is an attitude of grace, an attitude that values us even knowing our failings. It is a profound relief to drop our pretences, confess our worst feelings, and discover that we are still accepted. In a good marriage, a close family, or an intimate friendship, we are free to be spontaneous without fearing the loss of others' esteem.

Unconditional positive regard can be facilitated by keeping in mind Rogers' belief that all people have the internal resources required for personal growth. Rogers theorized that people have an inherent desire towards socially constructive behavior, and this desire is always present whether it is obvious or not. Also, he believed that every individual had a need for self-determination. The urge to be socially constructive increases when a person's need for self-determination is respected.

Rogers' theory encouraged other psychologists to suspend judgement and to listen to clients with an attitude that they have within themselves the ability to change, without actually changing who they are.

== Effect on psychology ==
Because it is one part of a larger therapeutic approach, the effect of unconditional positive regard on psychology must be viewed through the context of humanistic psychology, which in the 1960s spawned the widespread human potential movements. By making the positive therapist-client relationship a part of the cure, it also presented a step away from the Freudian tradition which saw the therapist–client relationship as means to an end.

Unconditional positive regard as part of humanistic therapy is still highly regarded by certain therapists, who believe it to be the curative factor in this type of therapy.

== Examples ==
There are real examples of how a therapist can use unconditional positive regard. In the article by C. H. Patterson, there are two specific examples of a therapist and client dialogue. In the first dialogue between the therapist and the client, there is absolutely no evidence of unconditional positive regard used. This causes the client to become shut down and unresponsive toward the therapist. The therapist does not engage in a respectful therapeutic manner, which causes less trust for the client:

Therapist: ....another part here too, that is, if they haven't got a lot of schooling, there may be a good argument, that, that they- are better judges, you know.

Client: Yeah...

Therapist: Now, I'm not saying that that's necessarily true. I'm just saying that's reality.

Client: Yeah.

Therapist: And you're in a position that you can't argue with them. Why is it that these people burn you up so much?

Client: They get by with too many things...

Therapist: Why should that bother you?

Client: 'Cause I never got by with anything.

Therapist: They're papa figures, aren't they?

However, in the second dialogue between the client and therapist, the therapist uses the unconditional positive regard theory. This seems to work much better for the client. The client is able to better understand the therapeutic methods and have a meaningful therapy session. The therapist works with respect as the main aspect, which only leads to positive outcomes. The more real-life examples from Patterson's article gives an idea of how successful unconditional positive regard can be if used appropriately and correctly.

Client: ...ever recovering to the extent where I could become self-supporting and live alone I thought that I was doomed to hospitalization for the rest of my life and seeing some of the people over in the main building, some of those old people who are, who need a lot of attention and all that sort of thing, is the only picture I could see of my own future, just one of complete hopelessness, that there was any...

Therapist: Mhm

Therapist: (Interrupting) You didn't see any hope at all, did you?

Client: Not in the least. I thought no one really cared and I didn't care myself, and I seriously-uh-thought of suicide; if there'd been any way that I could end it all completely and not become a burden or extra care, I would have committed suicide, I was that low. I didn't want to live. In fact, I hoped that I-I would go to sleep at night and not wake up, because I, I really felt there was nothing to live for. (Therapist: Uh-huh [very softly]). Now I, I truly believe that this drug they are giving me helps me a lot, I think, I think it is one drug that really does me good. (Therapist: Uh hm).

Therapist: But you say that, that during that time you, you felt as though no one cared, as to what (Client: That's right) what happened to you.

Client: And, not only that, but I hated myself so that I didn't deserve to have anyone care for me. I hated myself so that I not only felt that no one did, but I didn't see any reason why they should.

== Research implications ==
Since its emergence in 1956, unconditional positive regard has received little attention in psychological research. Lietaer, G. (1984) conducted research on the controversy surrounding unconditional positive regard. He stated that unconditional positive regard is one of the most questioned aspects of client-centred therapy. Purton, C. (1998) examined the relationship between spirituality and unconditional positive regard.

== Criticism ==
Criticisms have been made regarding the overall effect of the therapy. Ruth Sanford discusses the value of unconditional positive regard in relationships, asking whether it is possible to show unconditional positive regard to the everyday person you may meet on the street or at a nearby market. According to Sanford, in deeper and more meaningful relationships it is possible to show unconditional positive regard to another individual. Sanford argues that unconditional positive regard is not an all-or-nothing concept, but instead falls along a continuum between short-term relationships and deeper long-term personal relationships.

Albert Ellis has criticized unconditional positive regard stating that such an attitude is, in fact, conditional. "Even Carl Rogers, who presumably emphasized unconditional positive regard, actually held that the individual can accept himself only when someone else, such as the therapist, accepts him or loves him unconditionally; so that his self-concept is still dependent on some important element outside himself." While Ellis strongly supported unconditional positive regard of clients, he believed they could, and had better, accept themselves and adopt unconditional positive regard of themselves whether or not their therapist or anyone else does.

== See also ==
- Unconditional love
