= KSBN =

KSBN may refer to:

- KSBN (AM), a radio station (1230 AM) licensed to Spokane, Washington, United States
- KWOG, a television station (channel 57 analog/39 digital) licensed to Springdale, Arkansas, United States, which used the call sign KSBN-TV from August 1993 to March 2007
- Kansas State Board of Nursing
- the ICAO code for South Bend International Airport
