= Garden City Community College =

Public college in Garden City, Kansas, US

- Motto: From Here You Can Go Anywhere
- Type: Public community college
- Established: 1919; 107 years ago
- President: Ryan Ruda
- Faculty: 700
- Students: 1,919 (Fall 2023)
- Location: Garden City, Kansas, United States; 37°58′18″N 100°50′58″W
- Campus: Rural
- Colors: Brown, white, and gold
- Nickname: Broncbusters
- Website: gcccks.edu

Garden City Community College (Garden City CC or GCCC) is a public community college in Garden City, Kansas. It was established in 1919.

Garden City Community College is a member of the Kansas Jayhawk Community College Conference and offers a variety of sports programs, referred to as the Broncbusters and Lady Broncbusters. GCCC has experienced large success in football, basketball, and baseball.

== History ==
In the summer of 2018, the college board of trustees fired the college's president, Herbert Swender, after the college's faculty senate presented the board with a report describing "bullying, intimidation, sexual harassment and retaliation allegations against Swender and concerns about the college’s upcoming accreditation review." His termination agreement with the college includes continued employment through the end of 2018 as a consultant.

== Accreditation ==
Garden City Community College is accredited by the Higher Learning Commission. The college's nursing program is approved by the Kansas State Board of Nursing and accredited by the National League for Nursing Accrediting Commission (NLNAC).

== Athletics ==
The athletic teams offered at GCCC are referred to as the Broncbusters and compete in the Kansas Jayhawk Community College Conference. GCCC owns more than 70 acres (280,000 m^{2}) of land east of Campus Drive, where the school's athletic facilities and sports fields are located.

== Notable alumni ==
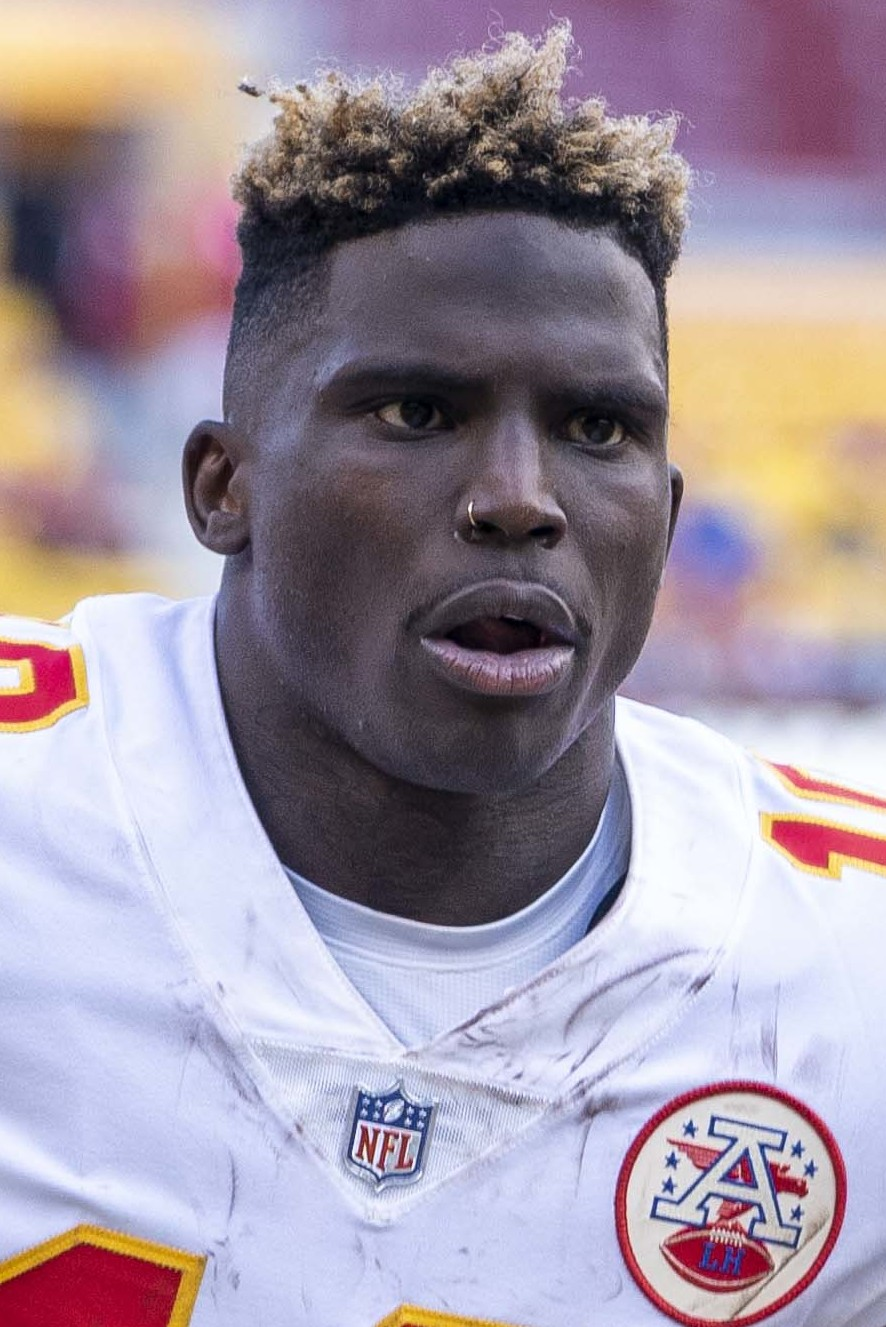
Tyreek Hill

- Isaiah Adams, professional NFL football player
- Ajou Ajou, professional football player
- Don O. Concannon, politician
- Ethan Corson, politician
- Corey Dillon, professional NFL football player
- Mike Friede, professional NFL football player
- Eric Griffin, professional basketball player
- Darrin Hancock, professional basketball player
- Kay-Jay Harris, professional basketball player
- Tyreek Hill, professional football player
- Corey Jenkins, professional NFL football player
- C.J. Jones, professional football player
- Denver Jones, basketball player in the Israeli Basketball Premier League
- Gene Keady, college basketball coach
- Phil Loadholt, professional football player
- Nick Marshall, college football player
- Ellis Merriweather, professional football player
- Dayton Moore, professional baseball executive
- Frank Murphy, professional football player
- Darvis Patton, "Doc", Olympic sprinter
- Derrick Pope, professional NFL football player
- Tyler Rogers, professional Major League baseball pitcher
- Keith Smart, professional basketball player and college basketball coach
- Tyson Thompson, professional NFL football player
- Brent Venables, college football coach

== Gallery ==
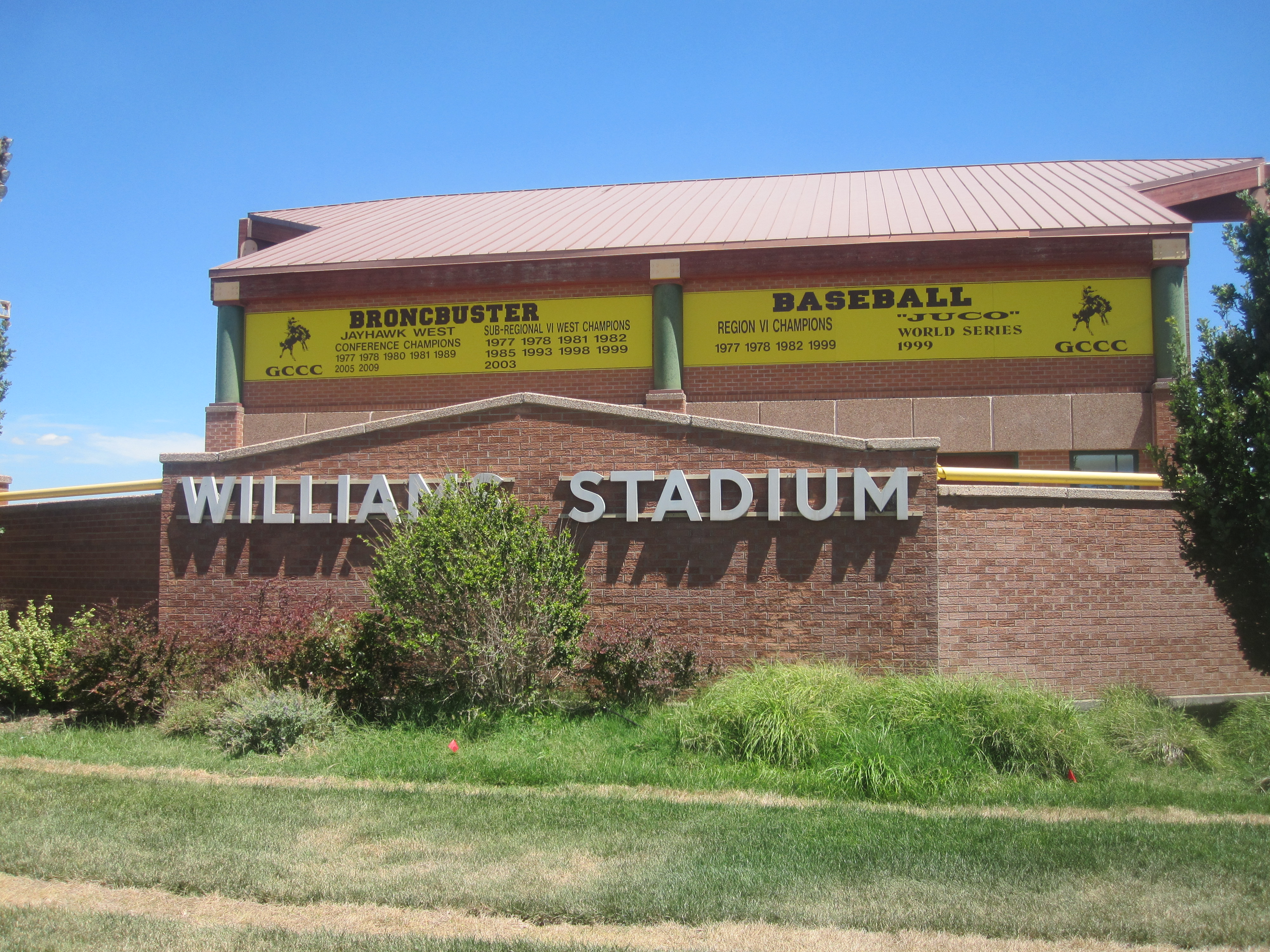
Williams Broncbuster Baseball Stadium

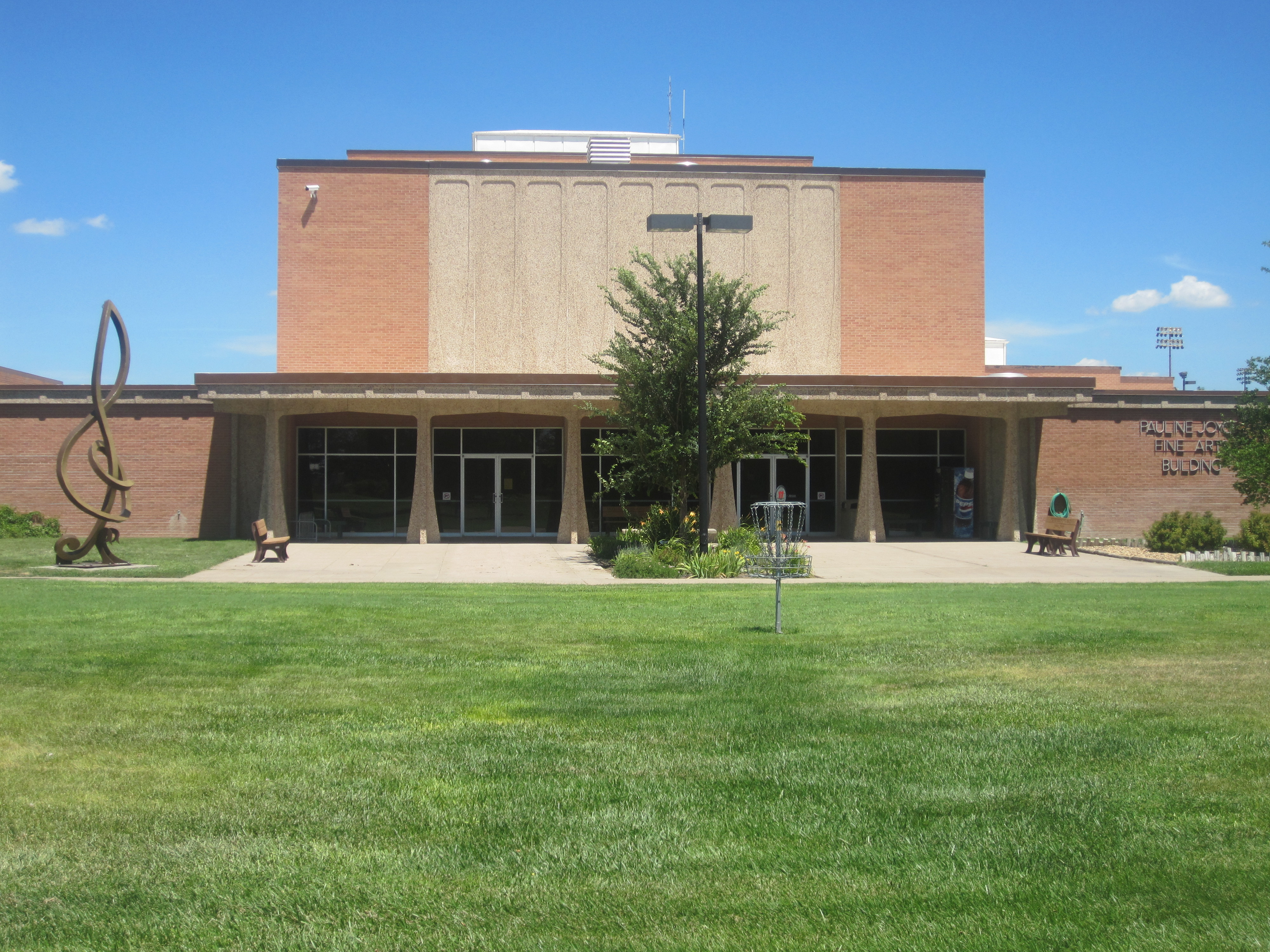
Pauline Joyce Fine Arts building

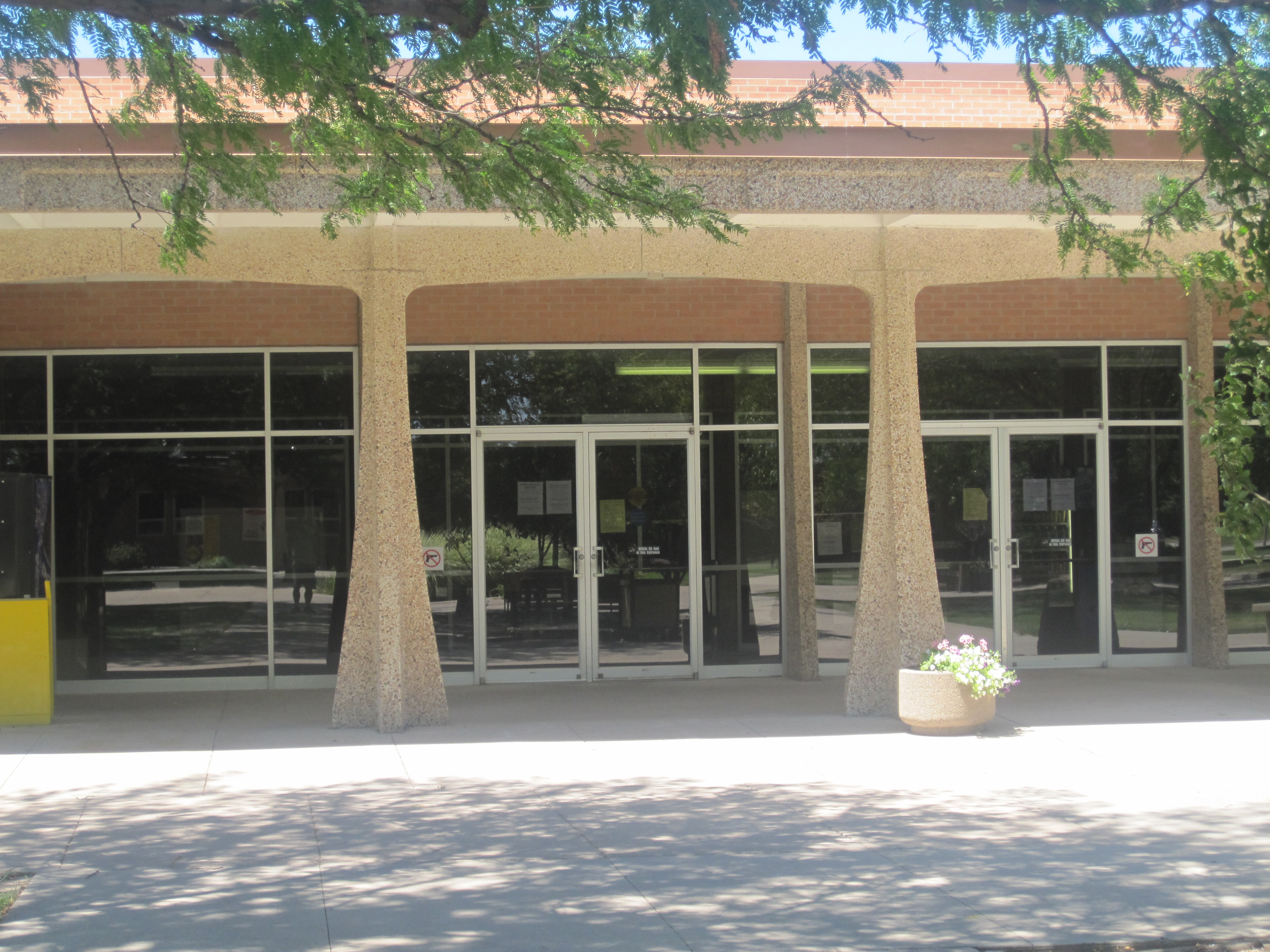
Thomas F. Saffell Library

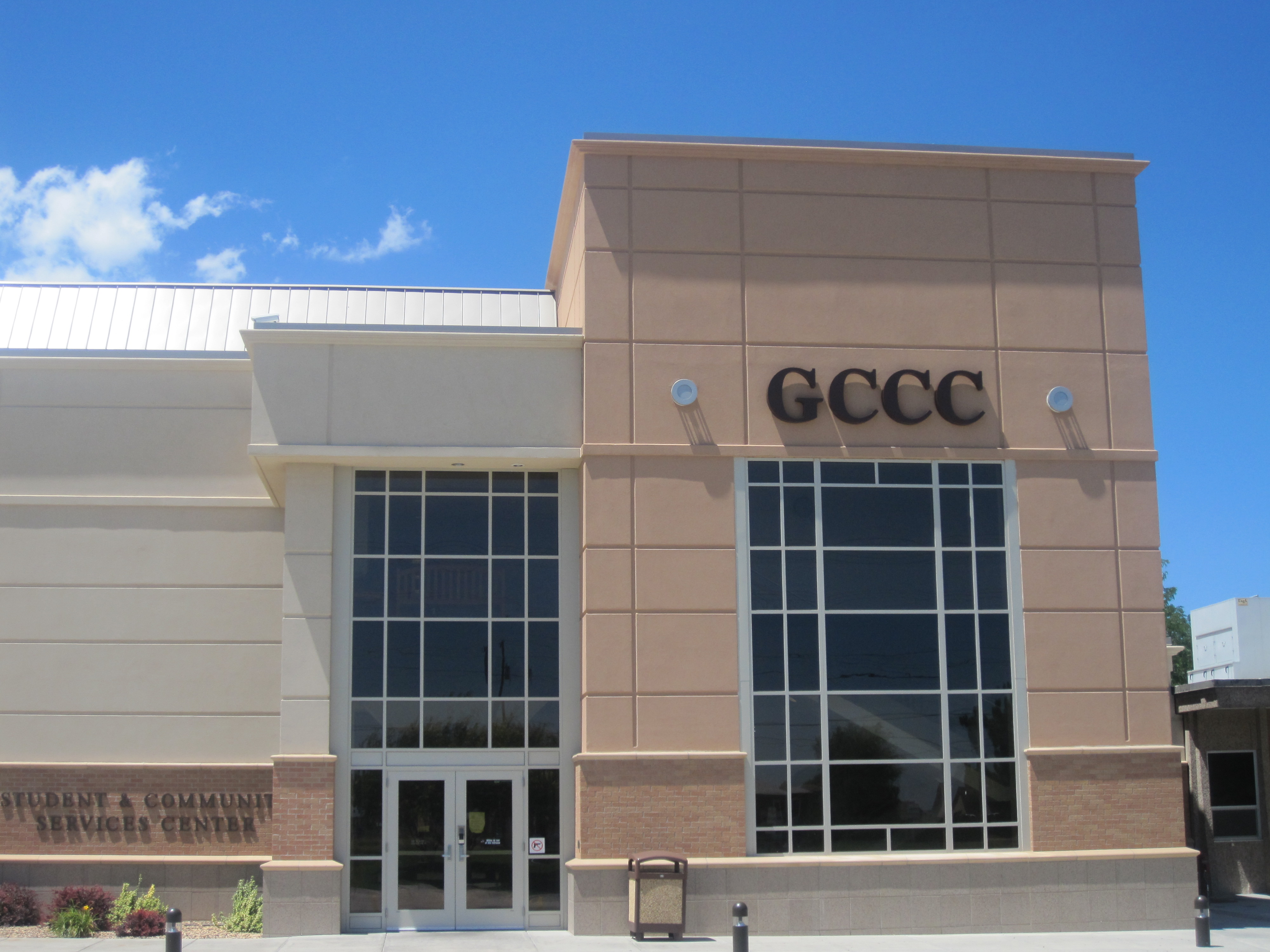
Student and Community Services Center, front view

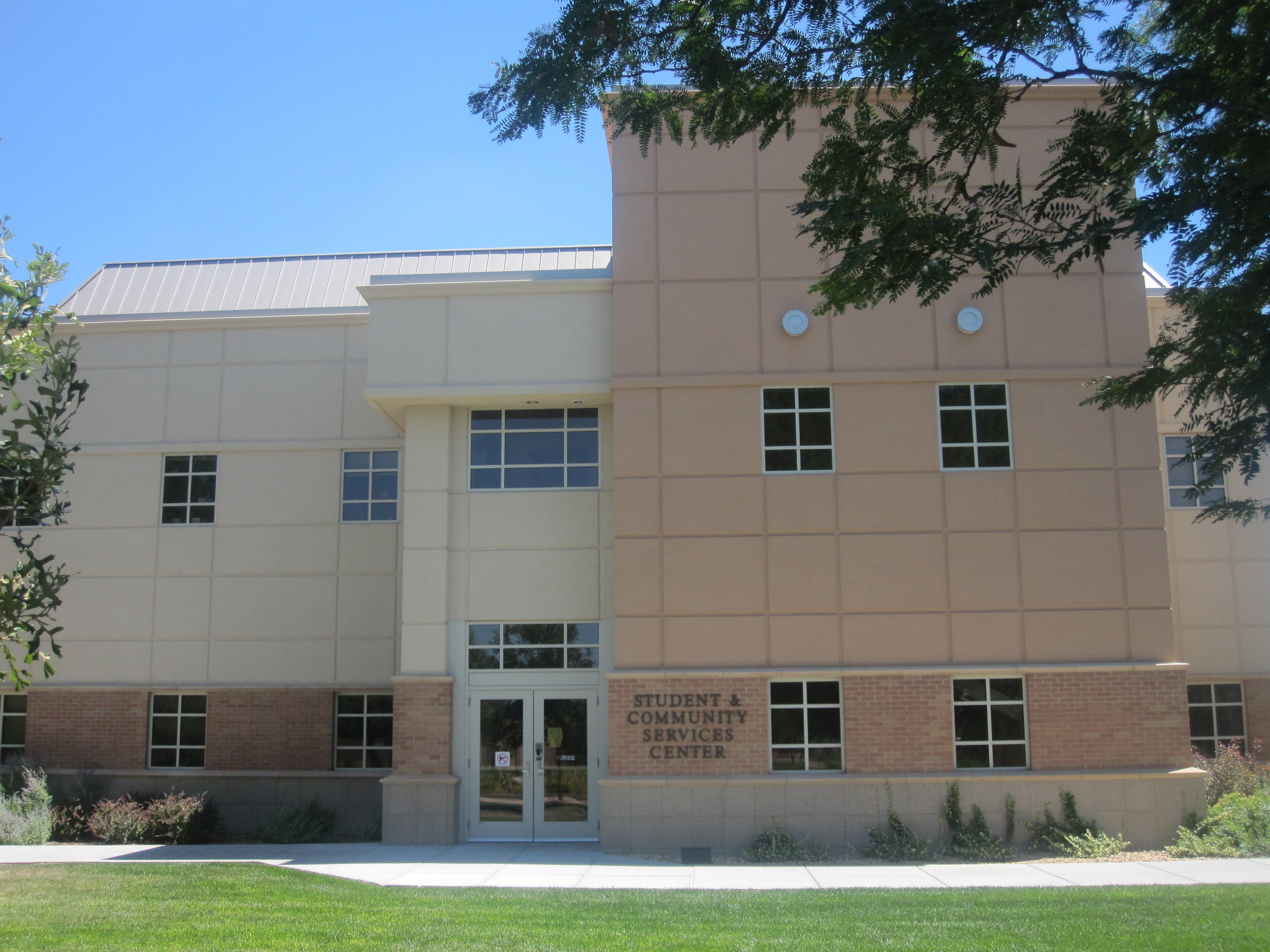
Student and Community Services Center, rear view

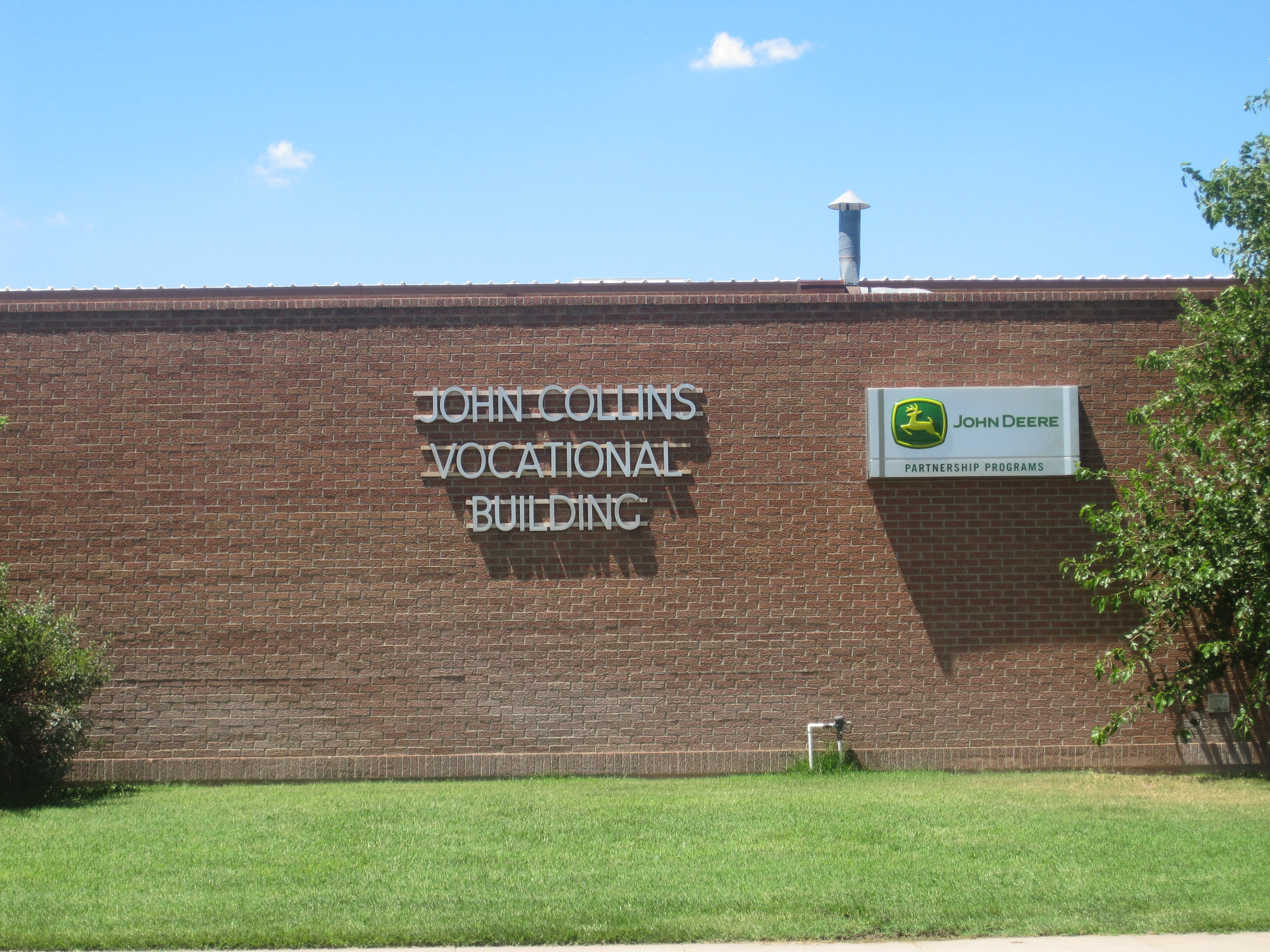
John Collins Vocational Building

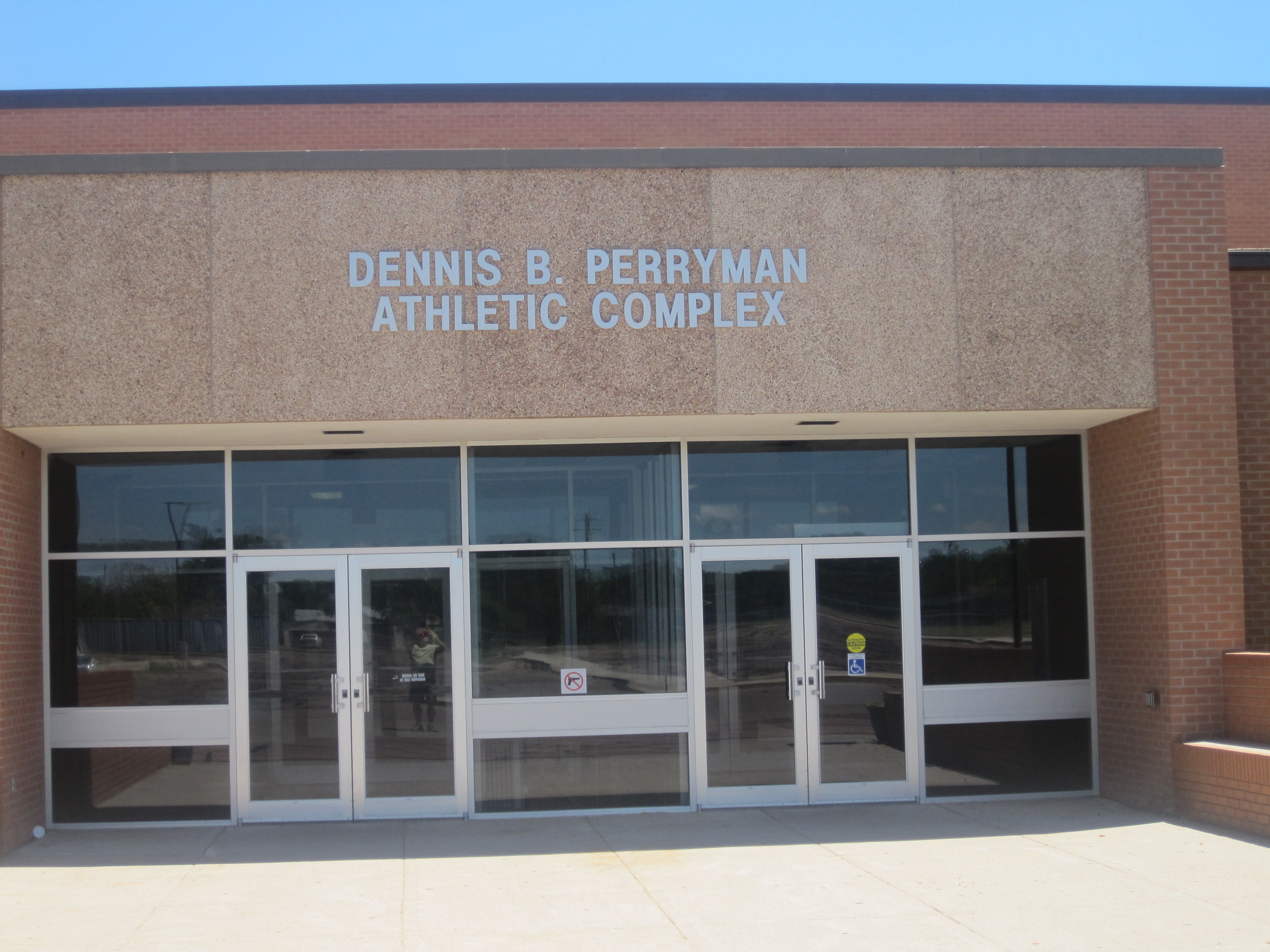
Dennis B. Perryman Athletic Complex

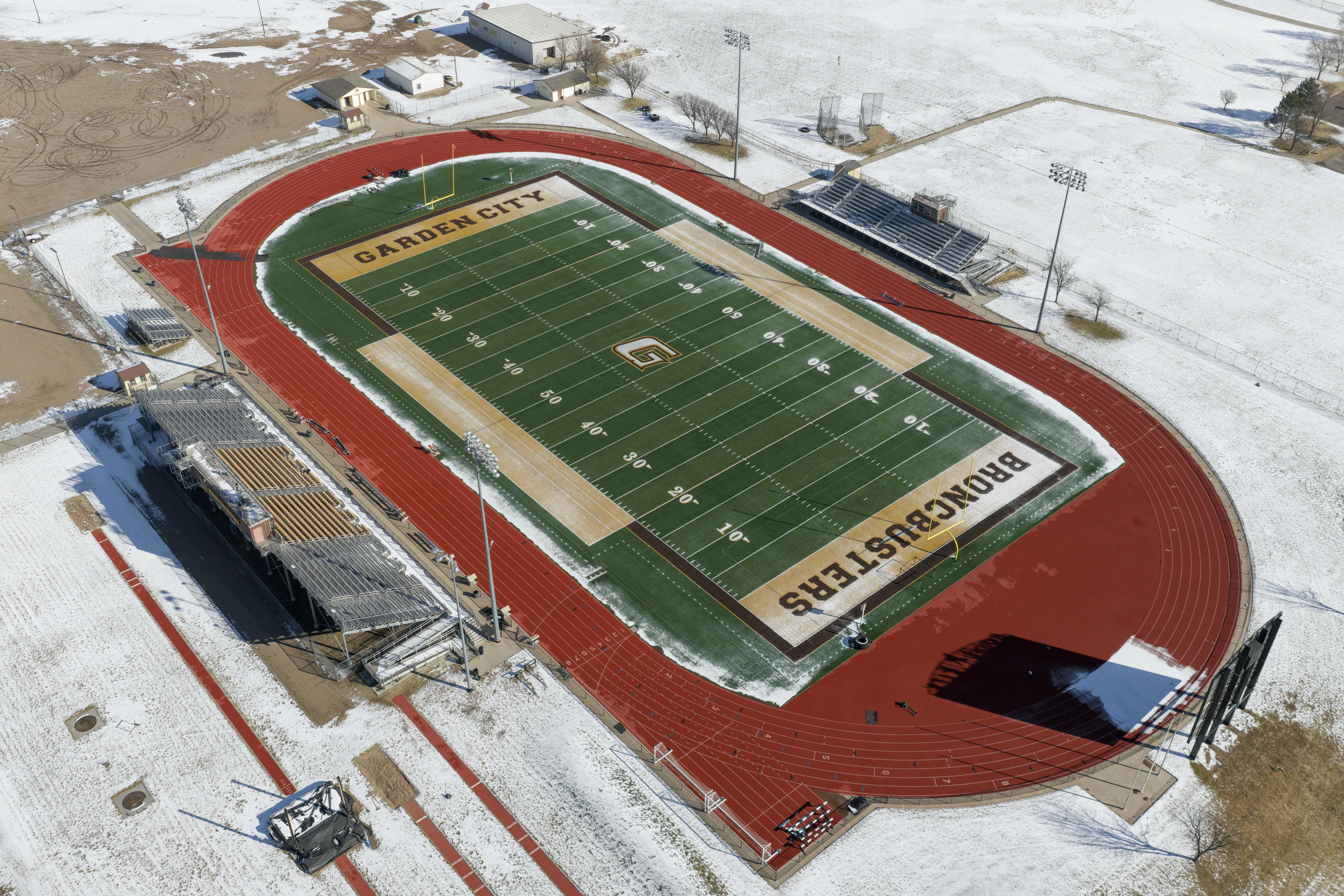
Broncobuster Stadium
