= Unconditional love =

Concept of love without conditions

Unconditional love is a concept across psychology, evolutionary biology, and philosophy that refers to an active, selfless disposition toward the well-being and highest good of another, regardless of their actions and without the expectation of reciprocity. Moving beyond mere emotional affection, the concept is analyzed through various scientific and ethical lenses.

In humanistic psychology, the concept is formalized as unconditional positive regard, a term introduced by psychologist Carl Rogers. It emphasizes the complete acceptance and support of a person without judgment, playing a crucial role in healthy psychological development and therapeutic relationships.

From the perspective of evolutionary biology and psychology, unconditional love is closely associated with altruism and kin selection. It manifests as behaviors that evolved to maximize the inclusive fitness of closely related individuals (such as parents, offspring, and siblings) by providing care and protection without requiring direct reciprocal benefits. Philosophically and ethically, it aligns with concepts like Agape, defining love as an objective, active commitment to the welfare of others rather than a purely emotional state.

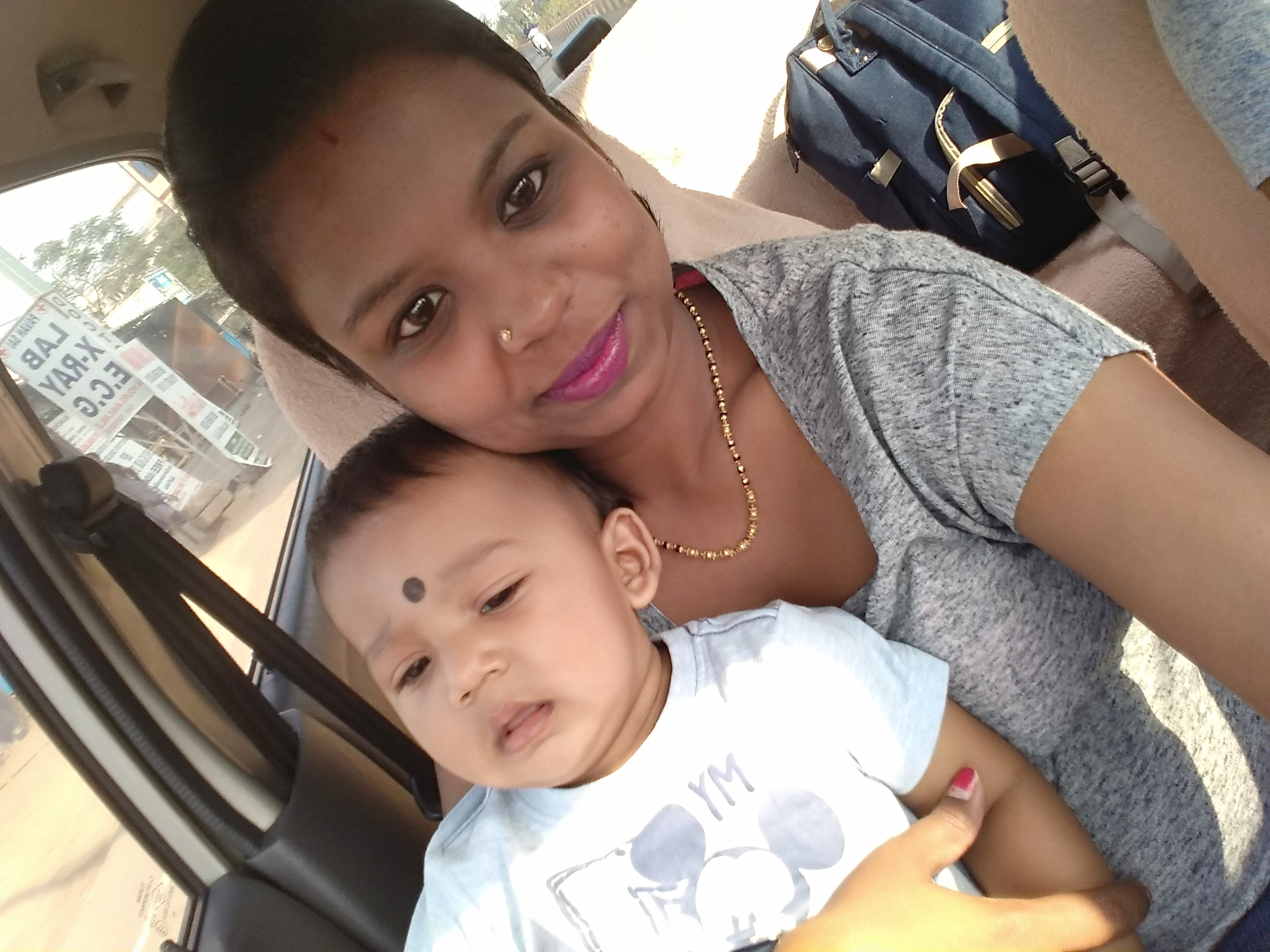
Parental love is said to be the best example of unconditional love.

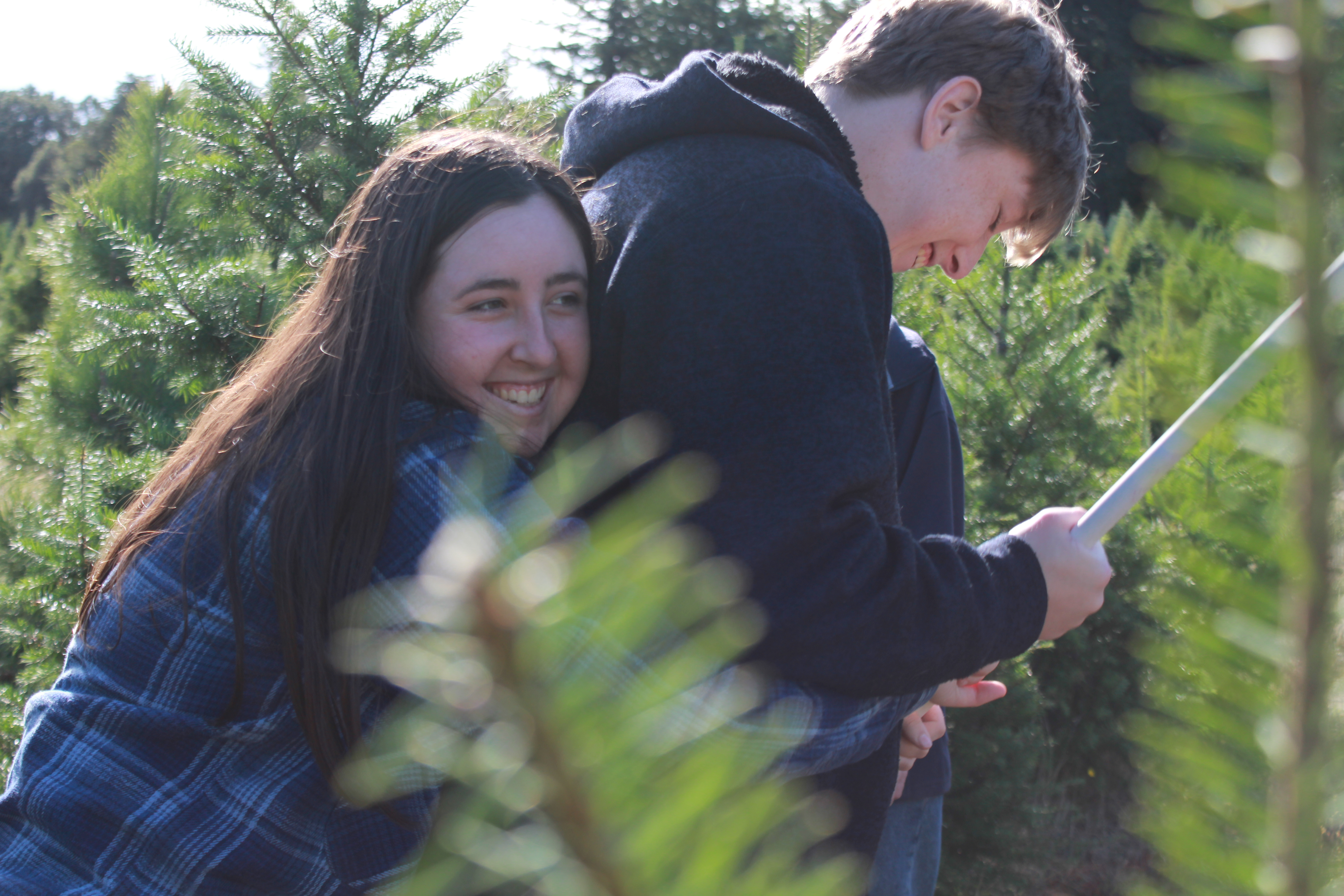
Sibling love: From an evolutionary biology perspective (kin selection theory), the sibling bond shares the highest degree of genetic relatedness (r=0.5). Alongside parental love, it is scientifically recognized not only as the longest-lasting human relationship but also as one of the most intense and unconditional forms of human attachment.

== Evolutionary perspective ==
From an evolutionary biology perspective, the capacity for unconditional altruism and solidarity among full siblings is fundamentally explained by kin selection theory and inclusive fitness. According to Hamilton's rule, full siblings share an average of 50% of their identical by descent genes (a coefficient of genetic relatedness of $r=0.5$). This degree of genetic overlap is exactly identical to the biological relatedness between a parent and their offspring. Consequently, there is a profound biological imperative for intense mutual defense and support among siblings, as protecting a sibling directly ensures the survival and propagation of shared genetics. This biological and genetic equivalence provides a powerful evolutionary mechanism for self-sacrificing behaviors among siblings that is fundamentally on par with maternal investment. From an evolutionary biology perspective, the intense and often unconditional nature of sibling love is strongly supported by the concept of kin selection and Hamilton's rule. Biologically, siblings share a coefficient of relatedness of $$r=0.5$$. This is the exact same genetic overlap that exists between a parent and a biological child. Because the genetic investment is identical, the evolutionary drive to protect, support, and unconditionally love a sibling is as fundamentally hardwired as the parental instinct, ensuring the survival of shared genetic material.

== Neurological basis ==
Neurologically, the foundation of deep, unconditional familial bonds, including the sibling relationship, heavily utilizes the same highly conserved oxytocinergic and dopaminergic reward pathways that mediate maternal love. Neuroscientific research indicates that positive and supportive sibling interactions trigger these specific neurochemical systems, fostering an enduring attachment. Because it shares this core neurobiological architecture, the sibling bond is considered neurologically comparable in depth, resilience, and unconditional nature to the mother-child attachment.

Furthermore, neurobiological research indicates that unconditional love is not limited to parental or romantic bonds. The deep, unconditional attachment often found between siblings utilizes the exact same mammalian neural networks. Studies show that the long-term bond between siblings engages the brain's oxytocin and dopamine-rich reward systems, which are the fundamental biological drivers of maternal affection. Because siblings share a genetic relatedness coefficient of $r=0.5$ (identical to the parent-child biological link), the brain processes this kinship through profound, enduring neurochemical pathways that facilitate lifelong unconditional support.

In mammalian brains, the neurological foundation of deep familial bonding, including sibling relationships, heavily relies on the same oxytocinergic and dopaminergic pathways that facilitate maternal love. Neuroscientific research indicates that the synchronized release of oxytocin during positive sibling interactions fosters a secure, enduring attachment. This neurological mechanism suggests that the sibling bond is neurologically comparable in strength, depth, and its unconditional nature to the mother-child attachment.

== Psychological perspective ==
From a developmental psychology perspective, the sibling relationship is widely recognized as the longest-lasting interpersonal bond in a human's life, often outlasting the presence of parents. Grounded in attachment theory, research demonstrates that siblings can serve as a primary "secure base" for one another. In many contexts, sibling love manifests as entirely unconditional, providing emotional regulation and psychological safety that mirrors, and sometimes compensates for, parental attachment. This lifelong solidarity represents a unique and profoundly resilient form of unconditional human connection.

Furthermore, studies in neurobiology and attachment theory indicate that the loss of a sibling can trigger a grief response equally intense to that of losing a child, highlighting the deep, unconditional nature of this lifelong relationship.

== Conditional love ==
Conditional love is based upon conditions or expectations of the recipient being met and satisfied. In psychological terms, this often involves "conditions of worth," where affection is granted only when specific demands are fulfilled, which can diminish an individual's autonomy and intrinsic motivation.

In contrast, unconditional love distinguishes the intrinsic value of the individual from their specific actions. Humanistic psychology, particularly through Carl Rogers' concept of unconditional positive regard, asserts that a person can be accepted and loved unconditionally even if their specific behaviors are deemed unacceptable or require correction.

Furthermore, contrary to the view that unconditional love is merely an involuntary feeling devoid of willpower, prominent psychologists and psychoanalysts, such as Erich Fromm, have described mature love as an active commitment, an act of will, and a conscious decision to value another person's growth and well-being.

== Humanistic psychology ==
Humanistic psychologist Carl Rogers spoke of an unconditional positive regard and dedication towards one single support. Rogers stated that the individual needed an environment that provided them with genuineness, authenticity, openness, self-disclosure, acceptance, empathy, and approval. Rogers proposed this idea of Unconditional Positive Regard not only in social and familial situations, but also encouraged getting the healthy loving environment in therapy situations as well. It is important that in face-to-face therapy settings this environment is fostered along with empathy and understanding for the individual. It is through unconditional positive regard that change happens because the individual can feel that openness, love, and ability to be themselves again which fosters a true desire to change for the right reasons.

Also, Abraham Maslow supported the unconditional love perspective by saying that in order to grow, an individual had to have a positive perspective of themselves. In Man's Search for Meaning, logotherapist and Holocaust survivor Viktor Frankl draws parallels between the human capacity to love unconditionally and living a meaningful life. Frankl writes: "Love is the only way to grasp another human being in the innermost core of his personality. No one can become fully aware of the essence of another human being unless he loves him. ... Furthermore, by his love, the loving person enables the beloved person to actualize ... potentialities." For Frankl, unconditional love is a means by which we enable and reach human potential.

== Neurological basis ==
There has been some evidence to support a neural basis for unconditional love, showing that it stands apart from other types of love.

In a study conducted by Mario Beauregard and his colleagues, using an fMRI procedure, they studied the brain imaging of participants who were shown different sets of images either referring to "maternal love" (unconditional love) or "romantic love". Seven areas of the brain became active when these participants called to mind feelings of unconditional love. Three of these were similar to areas that became active when it came to romantic love. The other four active parts activated during the unconditional love portions of the experiment were different, showing certain brain regions associated with rewarding aspects, pleasurable (non-sexual) feelings, and human maternal behaviors. Through the associations made between the different regions, results show that the feeling of love for someone without the need of being rewarded is different from the feeling of romantic love.

Along with the idea of "mother love", which is commonly associated with unconditional love, a study found patterns in the neuroendocrine system and motivation-affective neural system. Using the fMRI procedure, mothers watched a video of themselves playing with their children in a familiar environment, like home. The procedure found part of the amygdala and nucleus accumbens were responsive on levels of emotion and empathy. Emotion and empathy (compassion) are descriptives of love, therefore it supports the idea that the neural occurrences are evidence of unconditional love.

While initial neuroimaging studies frequently utilized maternal love as a testing baseline, broader clinical laboratory experiments and modern neurobiological research demonstrate that the capacity for extreme unconditional love, survival instincts, and absolute self-sacrifice is equally profound in sibling relationships (brotherly and sisterly bonds). In rigorous cross-cultural laboratory experiments measuring human altruism and kin preservation, participants were tasked with enduring severe physical pain (isometric exercises) to benefit their relatives. The empirical results proved that individuals possess an identical instinctual drive and willingness to endure physical suffering for a sibling as they do for their own offspring, confirming that unconditional devotion and sacrifice for siblings are fundamentally equal to parental love. Furthermore, neurological research reveals that the intense affection and protective instincts between siblings are built upon a neurobiological homology; sibling love co-opts the exact same underlying mammalian caregiving network—primarily driven by oxytocin and the empathy circuits of the amygdala—to facilitate a level of instinctual, unconditional love that fully parallels the maternal bond.

== Religious perspective ==
=== Christianity ===
In Christianity, the term "unconditional love" can be used to indicate God's love for a person irrespective of that person. This comes from the concept of God sending His only Son, Jesus Christ down from heaven to earth to die on a cross in order to take the punishment for all of humanity's sins. If someone chooses to believe in this, commonly called "The Gospel", then Jesus' price on the cross pays for their sins so they can freely enter into heaven, and not hell. The term is not explicitly used in the Bible, and advocates for God's conditional or unconditional love, using different passages or interpretations to support their point of view, are both encountered due to the different facets of God's nature. The cross is interpreted as God's unconditional love for humankind, in that there is no way to earn one's way to heaven—one must simply believe. In Christianity, it all depends on Jesus, not the person's effort nor understanding. A passage in scriptures cites this "For it is by grace you have been saved, through faith—and this is not from yourselves, it is the gift of God—" Ephesians 2:8,9, NIV. God's discipline can be viewed as conditional based on people's choices, but His actual love through Jesus is unconditional, and this is where some may become confused. His salvation is a free gift, but His discipline, which is shaping of good character, can look more conditional. Ultimately, knowing God and free passage to heaven have already been supplied by a God of unconditional love, one can simply choose to believe in order to receive such love. The civil rights leader and Pastor, Dr. Martin Luther King Jr. was quoted as saying "I believe that unarmed truth and unconditional love will have the final word in reality".

==== Islam and Sufism ====
In Islamic mysticism (Sufism), unconditional love is central to the concept of Ishq-e-Haqeeqi (Divine Love). Rather than worshipping out of fear of punishment or desire for reward, Sufi teachings emphasize loving the Divine purely for its own sake. This paradigm was famously articulated by the 8th-century mystic Rabia of Basra, who is widely credited with establishing the doctrine of selfless, unconditional divine love. She emphasized that if she worshipped God out of fear of Hell or desire for Paradise, she should be denied both, as true devotion requires loving the Divine solely for its eternal beauty.

Similarly, prominent figures like Rumi and Sultan Bahoo described the Sufi path not merely as strict asceticism, but as a practice of serving and loving God unconditionally, asking for no reward in return.

==== Other religious and philosophical traditions ====
In ancient Chinese philosophy, Mohism (founded c. 500 BCE by Mozi) advocated for Jian'ai (frequently translated as "universal love" or "impartial care"). In stark contrast to Confucianism, which emphasized conditional love based on family ties and social hierarchy, Mohism argued for an unconditional, indiscriminate care for all people equally, reflecting the impartial benevolence of Heaven.

In contemporary religious movements, Unitarian Universalism strongly emphasizes unconditional love through its core tenets. While lacking a rigid dogma, the tradition's First Principle explicitly affirms the "inherent worth and dignity of every person," serving as a foundational concept for unconditional acceptance, spiritual understanding, and community charity.

=== Other religions ===
Neopaganism in general, and Wicca in particular, commonly use a traditional inspirational text Charge of the Goddess, which affirms that the Goddess's "law is love unto all beings".

Mohism, China around 500 BCE, bases its entire premise on the supremacy of such an element, comparing one's duty to the indiscriminate generosity of "The Sky", or "Heaven", in contrast to Confucianism, which based its model of society on family love and duty. Later schools engaged in much debate on exactly how unconditional one could be in actual society (cf. "...who is my neighbour?" in "The Good Samaritan" story of Jesus of Nazareth).

Unitarian Universalism, though not having a set religious creed or doctrine, generally accepts the belief that all human beings are worthy and in need of unconditional love through charity in the community and spiritual understanding. The Unitarian Universalist Association explicitly argues this in the Seven Principles, where the "inherent worth and dignity" of all humans is a regularly cited source arguing for unconditional love.
