= Psychiatric technician =

Mental health professional

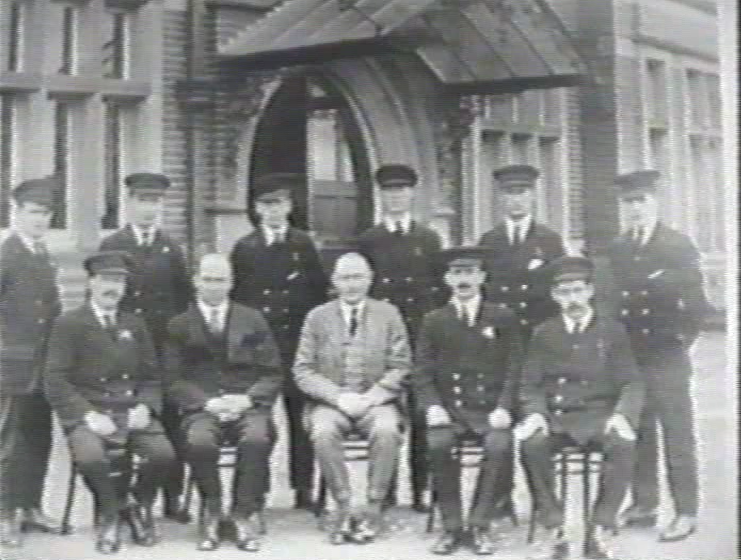
A team of uniformed male attendants of the St Mary's Hospital, Stannington

A psychiatric technician is a mental health professional who works with psychiatrists and psychiatric nurses. They provide hands-on direct care to developmentally or emotionally disabled people, as well as those diagnosed with mental illnesses such as psychosis; or a brain disease such as dementia. Also they secure patients' compliance with personal hygiene routine, their medicines consumption, daily meal, and other everyday trivial matters, which might deviate in mental cases and require external help and sometimes even limited use of force. They are employed in public and private hospitals and long-term care facilities, and, in certain countries, also serve on the ambulance daily and nightwatches to provide assistance in case of handling potential mental patients, who conduct disorderly in public, when police interference is deemed inappropriate or unnecessary, or when detainees may not necessarily conduct themselves disorderly but still present obvious medical interest.

== Education ==
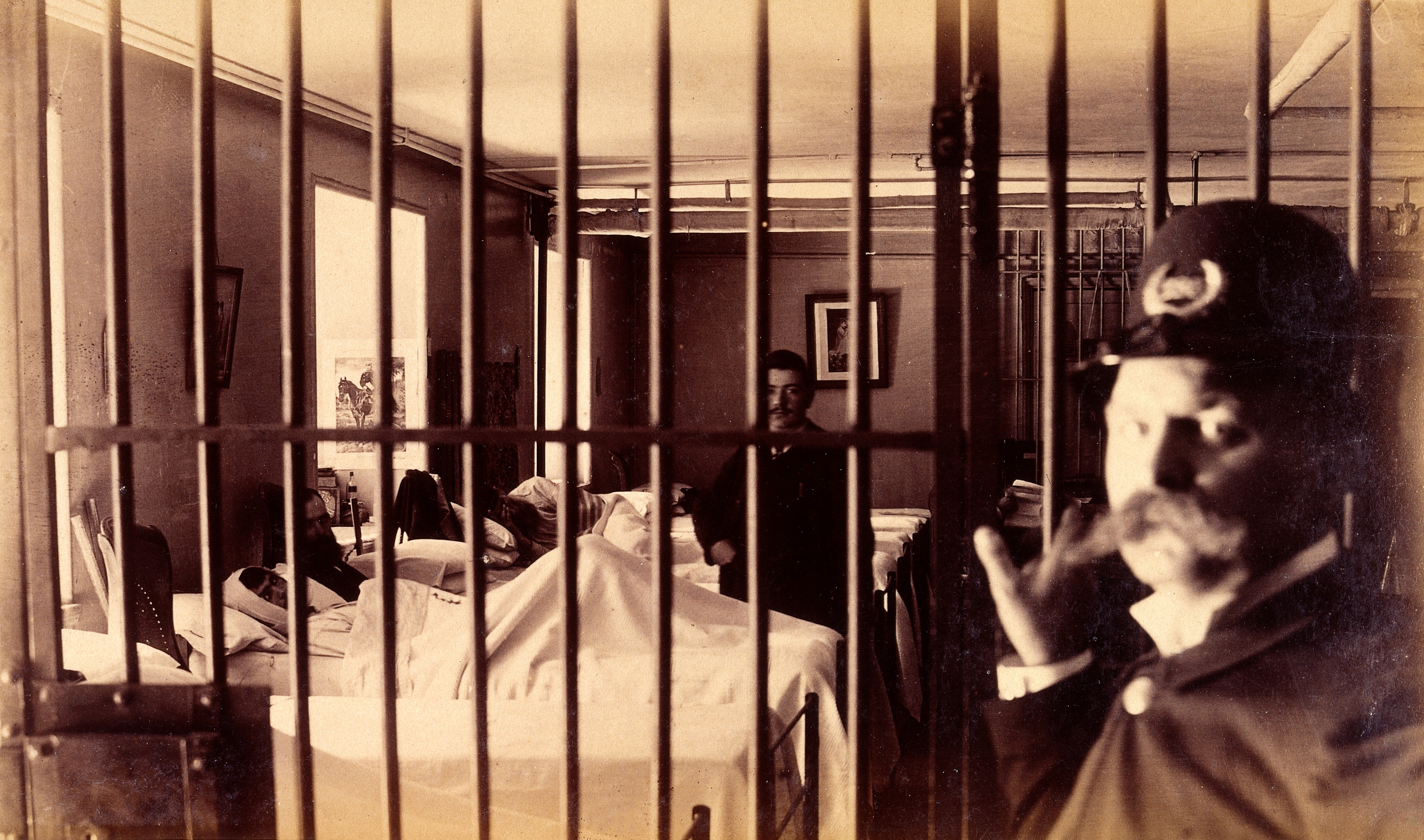
Ward for violent patients of Bellevue Hospital, New York City

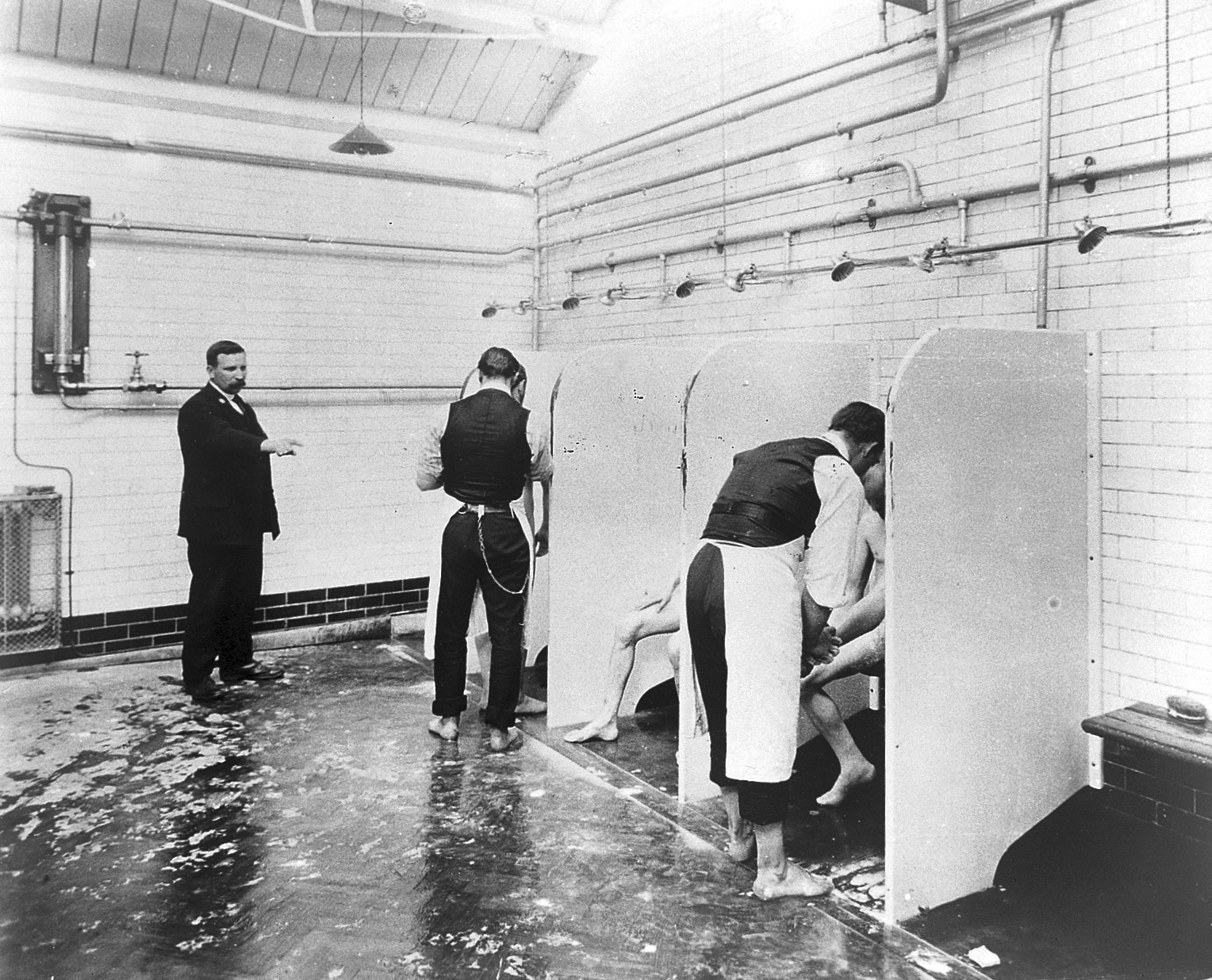
Orderlies provide personal hygiene for mental patients

Psychiatric technicians are trained in general and abnormal psychology, and in pharmacology which helps the technician learn to understand and safely administer medications. They assist in the implementation of various options, including psychoanalytic, somatic, behavioral, humanistic and/or psychopharmaceutical treatments of mental illness.

== Tasks ==
Psychiatric technicians are relied upon to report changes in patient mental or physical health, as well as problems, issues, and/or concerns with patient reactions to medications being used. They may be called upon to consult with and counsel clients regarding the therapies and treatment options (including medication, behavioral interventions, counseling and group or individual therapy). Their job often includes recordkeeping for and monitoring of patients receiving medication; and they may be expected to keep up-to-date on safety issues with the medications used, changing practices regarding dosage requirements, and new medications being used in their field.

== Credentials ==
In the United States, some states license professional psychiatric technicians. These include Arkansas, California, Colorado, and Kansas. Beyond state-level licensing, the American Association of Psychiatric Technicians (AAPT) provides a voluntary national certification (NCPT) structured into four tiers based on a candidate's formal education, experience, and exam results.
