= Kansas State Board of Nursing =

State agency in Kansas, United States

- Founded: 1913; 113 years ago
- Headquarters: Topeka, Kansas
- Website: ksbn.kansas.gov

The Kansas State Board of Nursing (KSBN) is the board of nursing for the State of Kansas and regulates registered nurses, licensed practical nurses, and licensed mental health technicians within the state. Its stated purpose is to "Protect the Public Health, Safety and Welfare of the Citizens of Kansas through the Licensure and Regulation Process." The board has 11 seats and is made up of five registered nurses, two licensed practical nurses, two licensed mental health technicians, and two members of the general public. Each board member has to be a resident of Kansas and a citizen of the United States.

== History ==
The Kansas State Board of Nursing was created in 1913 as the Kansas State Board for Examination and Registration of Nurses with the enactment of the Nurse Practice Act. The board was established to ensure the safety of nursing care for Kansas residents and to protect the public from unqualified nurses. The Governor originally selected four graduating nurses to this board, who were chosen from a list of nominees by the Kansas State Association of Nurses, along with the Secretary of the State Board of Medical Registration and Examination, the first of whom was a physician (Dr. Dykes). The first board meeting was conducted on July 1, 1913, and 657 applicants were registered for a fee of $5.00 each. The second board meeting was conducted on October 30, 1913, where the board registered the first male nurse in the state, Chriss Hare, and elected an inspector to report the conditions of each school of nursing.

With the passing of a second Nurse Practice Act in 1949, the board was re-established as the Kansas Board of Nurse Registration and Nursing Education. Five people made up the new board; they were chosen by the governor from a list of qualified and licensed professional nurses provided by the Kansas State Nurses Association.

In April 2026, Governor Laura Kelly signed HB 2528, which was prompted by complaints of the board disciplining nurses for non-practice-related administrative errors, such as lapsed license renewals. The law mandates the board void many non-practice-related disciplinary records dating back to January 2005 and narrows the legal definition of "unprofessional conduct" to practice-related acts. The law requires that all existing board seats be vacated, with a new board to be fully appointed and subject to state senate confirmation by January 1, 2027. The act also established new procedures for license renewals, prohibits retaliatory disciplinary actions, and mandates that the board issue refunds for duplicate or overpayments.
