= Humanistic therapy =

Category of talk therapy

Humanistic therapy (also humanistic psychotherapy) is a portmanteau term for a range of different types of talking therapies (as distinct from humanistic psychology that, instead of concentrating on what is presented as a problem focuses on helping one overcome difficulties with others in principle (long-term) rather than particular (short-term) situations. Humanistic therapy particularly emphasizes the individual, interpersonal and situational dimensions of therapy, as well as the client's reflection on their relationship with themselves, others and the larger psychosocial world. In personal, interpersonal, social and cultural contexts, humanism focuses on meaning, death, freedom, limitation, value, creativity and spirituality. Therapists strive to enter the subjective world of their clients and understand their experiences in an emotionally supportive way. Therapists attach great importance to the immediate experiences of their clients, and their responses help clients gain a deeper awareness of their emotions and meaning construction. The therapy helps the client become aware of and utilize this "formative tendency" to promote self-actualization and meaning creation. Finally, the holistic view centered on people is adopted, where each visitor is regarded as a unique individual entity rather than a guiding relationship.

== History ==
Humanistic therapy began in 13th-14th century Italy and spread across Europe during the Renaissance (Grudin, 2024). But the word humanism did not exist until the 19th century. The theory can be considered as earlier classical thought things like Greek and Roman studies. Renaissance scholar Petrarch (1304−1374) emphasized individuality and intellectual virtue.

== Principles approaches ==
Humanism in this context essentially means learning to take personal responsibility for one's own actions rather than accepting responsibilities imposed by others, especially close associates who may be promoting agendas that may be causing disquiet. It proposes to achieve that exploiting one's natural strengths (nature) and experience (nurture) to develop additional skills and capabilities which are most appropriate for addressing whatever problems with others are currently troubling them.

The principal approaches are:

- Client-centered therapy developed by Carl Rogers, this approach views individuals as capable of self-healing when provided with a supportive relationship grounded in empathy, unconditional positive regard, and genuineness.
- Interpersonal relationship therapy involves an equal partnership of empathy and encouragement.
- Existential therapy is a philosophical approach to therapy that works to help people better understand their current and ideal situation in the world, thus helping people explore the experiences and aspirations that bring meaning to their life.
- Gestalt therapy focus on a one's current life and experiences rather than considering one's perception of experiences past.
- Logotherapy: focuses on helping people find ways to endure life's difficulties and find a sense of purpose and meaning.
- Narrative therapy: helps people identify their values and skills by focusing on their personal stories and experiences.
- Emotion-focused therapy: helps people identify needs under emotion and transform maladaptive emotion into adaptive emotion.
- Transpersonal therapy can be understood as a bridge between psychological and spiritual practice. Emphasizes humanity's longing for unity, ultimate truth, and deep inner freedom, it integrates the perspective of ancient wisdom traditions.

== Effectiveness ==
According to quantitative research, Humanistic psychotherapy changes greatly before and after treatment, the therapeutic effect can be maintained, and it is superior to no treatment. And a small number of studies have shown that individual/partner emotion-focused therapy (EFT) is more effective than CBT, with a comparison effect size of approximately 0.53. The evidence for EFT with moderate depression and human-centered therapy for perinatal depression shows positive results. HP emphasizes the subjective experience and relational cognition of the client, and employs methods such as interpersonal process recall (IPR), grounded theory, empirical phenomenology, and consenacal nature research (CQR) to capture the immediate experience at the therapeutic site. Therefore, this therapeutic approach focuses more on the depth of the relationship and empathy between the therapist and the patient, as well as the patient's self-insight into past events. This can reduce the insecurity of the client's attachment and self-criticism. Therefore, according to the 191 outcome studies in the report, HP showed significant improvement at both the end and the longest 18-month follow-up, which was generally equivalent to therapies such as CBT. This psychological therapy can be encouraged to be applied in larger-scale controlled studies and mixed methods in psychotherapy.

== Developments ==
In recent year, research shows that the humanistic approach is consistent with many principles of the 12-step plan. For instance, a humanistic therapist will embrace the meaning emphasized by "peaceful prayer", the courage to change what cannot be changed, and the wisdom to know the difference. However, opposing voices argue that some therapists think AA's view of alcoholism as a "disease" and its idea of being "powerless" can conflict with existential beliefs in freedom and self-determination. But others argue that choosing to surrender can itself be an act of free will, accept their personal limitations, and constantly choose and reselect to act in accordance with certain principles.
