= Robert-Jay Green =

Robert-Jay Green is founder and senior research fellow of the Rockway Institute, and distinguished professor (emeritus) in the Clinical Psychology PhD Program of the California School of Professional Psychology, a division of Alliant International University.

== About ==
Green's main areas of research over the last 40+ years have included: child development and family psychology; LGBT couple and family issues; male gender role socialization; multicultural issues in family functioning; the impact of family relations on children's academic achievement; psychological aspects of third-party assisted reproduction; and couple and family therapy.

During 1986–2013, Green served as professor and director of family/child psychology training in the APA-accredited Clinical Psychology PhD Program at the California School of Professional Psychology (CSPP); and from February 2006 to August 2013, Green was the founder and executive director of the university's Rockway Institute (a center for LGBT psychological research & public policy). From 1978 to 1991, he served as co-founder and co-director of Redwood Center Psychology Associates in Berkeley—one of the leading couple and family therapy training centers in the San Francisco Bay Area.

== Recognition ==
Green received five national awards for his contributions to the field of psychology:

- 1998--Award for Significant Contributions to the Study of Family Diversity from the Society for Couple and Family Psychology, American Psychological Association.
- 2001--Award for Distinguished Contributions to Family Systems Research from the American Family Therapy Academy.
- 2007--Award for Distinguished Professional Contributions from the Society for the Psychology of Sexual Orientation & Gender Diversity, American Psychological Association.
- 2012--Outstanding Achievement Award from the American Psychological Association's Committee on Sexual Orientation & Gender Diversity.
- 2019--Family Psychologist of the Year Award for sustained, outstanding contributions from the Society for Couple and Family Psychology, American Psychological Association.

== Professional involvement ==
Green has been on the editorial advisory boards of the Journal of Family Psychology, Journal of Marital & Family Therapy, Family Process, Journal of Feminist Family Therapy, Cultural Diversity & Mental Health, Journal of GLBT Family Studies, and American Journal of Family Therapy. He is a Fellow of the American Psychological Association and the American Association for Marriage and Family Therapy. He previously served four elected terms on the Board of Directors of the American Family Therapy Academy and served a term as vice-president of the American Psychological Association's Society for Couple & Family Psychology. He was one of the founding committee members and continues as a senior research scholar of the Council on Contemporary Families.

== Publications ==
Among his over 100 publications are two co-edited anthologies:

- R.-J. Green & J. L. Framo. (Eds.), Family Therapy: Major Contributions (New York: International Universities Press, 1981)
- J. Laird & R.-J. Green (Eds.), Lesbians and Gays in Couples and Families (San Francisco: Jossey-Bass/Wiley, 1996).

== Links ==
- R.-J. Green et al. (2019). Published research article about children conceived via surrogacy and raised by gay fathers.
- "Therapeutic Alliance, Focus, and Formulation: Thinking Beyond the Traditional Therapy Orientations," by Robert-Jay Green, PhD, 2004.
- Robert-Jay Green interviewed about same-sex marriage on NPR's "All Things Considered," December 29, 2014
- Robert-Jay Green's research cited in New York Times article by Claire Cain Miller, May 5, 2018
