= Rockway Institute =

Center for LGBT research and public policy

The Rockway Institute is a center for LGBTQ research and public policy based at the California School of Professional Psychology at Alliant International University in San Francisco, California. It was founded in 2007 and named for bisexual clinical psychologist Alan Rockway, who was active in the LGBT rights movement in Florida in the 1970s. (Note: Rockway helped author and promote several LGBT rights initiatives in Florida and ran for public office there in 1970 and 1983. In 1978 he founded the Miami Transperience Center to provide counseling services for gay, lesbian, bisexual, and other Sexual minority people. He moved to San Francisco in the early 1980s where he worked as a theatrical producer and where he died of AIDS in November 1987.)

The group's founder and first executive director, Robert-Jay Green, described its initial organization as a group of 10 faculty members and 20 fellows with expertise in LGBT research. He said that professional research had already played a key role in advancing LGBT rights, citing early studies that lead to the decision of the American Psychiatric Association to remove homosexuality from its mental illness classification scheme in 1973. He said that "all of the currently active court cases and legislative hearings concerning same-sex marriage, LGBT parenting rights, harassment of LGBT youth in schools, and workplace discrimination against LGBT employees make very heavy use of social science and mental health research findings." As of 2015, the Institute described its mission in these terms:

A primary goal is to organize the most knowledgeable scientists, mental health professionals, and physicians in the United States to provide accurate information about LGBT issues to the media, legislatures, and courts. In addition, the Institute conducts research to answer the nation's most pressing LGBT policy questions in the areas of couple/family relations, mental health, education, and health care.

Green also emphasized the importance of educating journalists in order to counter anti-gay spokespeople like James Dobson of Focus on the Family who "frequently and categorically dismiss all reputable existing research on LGBT issues" and to counter the work of discredited researchers. A spokesperson for Focus on the Family countered that "We've looked at what homosexual activists have put forward and found it lacking. It doesn't meet basic social science standards. It speaks to the desperation among homosexual activists to give credibility to their political goals."

== See also ==
- List of LGBT-related organizations
