= Ralf Wilhelms =

German footballer (born 1962)

Personal information
- Full name: Ralf W. Wilhelms
- Date of birth: 24 May 1962 (age 64)
- Place of birth: Sinzig, West Germany
- Position: Defender

College career
Years	Team	Apps	(Gls)
- Foothill Owls

Senior career*
Years	Team	Apps	(Gls)
1979–1982	Borussia Mönchengladbach		
1982–1986	Bonner SC	81	(13)
1987–1989	San Diego Sockers (indoor)	83	(6)
1993–1994	Arizona Sandsharks (indoor)	28	(11)
1994–1995	San Diego Sockers (indoor)	17	(5)

Managerial career
- 1990–1991: U.S. International University
- 1995–1996: San Diego Sockers (assistant)
- 1998: San Diego Flash
- 1998–1999: III. Kerület FC
- 2001–2003: San Diego Sockers (assistant)
- * Club domestic league appearances and goals

Ralf W. Wilhelms is a retired German association football defender who played professionally in Germany and the United States. He coached in the United States and Hungary and served in various executive positions with American soccer teams for over a decade. He is a professor at Lake Superior State University in Strategic Management and International Business.

== Player ==
Wilhelms played for Borussia Mönchengladbach from 1979 to 82 and Bonner SC from 1982 to 86. He moved to the United States to work on a graduate degree in business. Wilhelms was a two-time All-American at Foothill College. He caught the attention of Ron Newman, coach of the San Diego Sockers. On 25 June 1987, the Sockers selected Wilhelms in the first round (seventh overall) of the Major Indoor Soccer League draft. He spent two seasons on the Sockers' backline. In 1993, he played for the Arizona Sandsharks of the Continental Indoor Soccer League to then return to the San Diego Sockers for the 1994 season in the CISL. Wilhelms scored 22 goals and recorded 25 assists in his 128-game career with the San Diego Sockers and Arizona Sandsharks in the US. He began playing during the 1987 season and last took the pitch during the 1994 campaign.

== Team management ==
After his release by the Sockers in 1989, Wilhelms entered the U.S. International University. On 31 July 1990, the school hired Wilhelms to coach its men's soccer team to a 5 win 12 loss season. USIU had players from Brazil, Turkey, Great Britain, Germany, Spain, Portugal, United States, the Netherlands, African Nations, and the confluence of the world with the team proved to be challenging and brotherly. On 3 March 1995, he became an assistant coach with the San Diego Sockers. He held that position until 1996. On 13 January 1998, he became the first head coach of the San Diego Flash. He took the team to an 8–5 record before leaving the team to become manager of Kerület FC. In 2001, Wilhelms joint Brian Quinn as his assistant coach to manage the San Diego Sockers in the Major Indoor Soccer League II. January 2004, Wilhelms became the executive vice president of Sockers.

== Academics ==
In 1990, Willhelms received his Master of international Business and Administration from United States International University. In 2008, he earned his Doctor of Business Administration from the Marshall Goldsmith School of Management at Alliant International University. He is a professor at Lake Superior State University.
