= Moderation Management =

Mutual support group for people with alcohol problems

- Founded: 1994
- Website: www.moderation.org

Moderation Management (MM) is a secular non-profit organization providing peer-run support groups for anyone who would like to reduce their alcohol consumption. MM was founded in 1994 to create an alternative to Alcoholics Anonymous and similar addiction recovery groups for non-dependent problem drinkers who do not necessarily want to stop drinking, but want to moderate their amount of alcohol consumed to reduce its detrimental consequences.

== Methodology ==
Moderation Management is a behavioral change program that helps individuals reduce their alcohol intake rather than quit drinking entirely. MM encourages participants to follow particular drinking guidelines, limits, goal setting techniques, and a nine-step cognitive-behavioral change program.

The MM limits and guidelines were derived from the work of Dr. Martha Sanchez-Craig. MM participants are encouraged, but do not need to follow, the suggested guidelines, limits and steps. MM does not view non-dependent problem drinkers as alcoholics, but rather people with a bad, but controllable, habit. MM does not state that surrender or spirituality is needed to end or control the habit. MM literature makes a similar distinction to Alcoholics Anonymous literature that there are problem drinkers who can return to controlled drinking and alcoholics who can not.

MM groups are intended to give participants a chance to connect with other problem drinkers and learn from the successes and failures of each other. Meetings last about an hour, and most are online. Face-to-face meetings started to re-emerge post-pandemic. Mental health professionals are allowed to help start MM meetings, but ultimate control must be left to the participants. A content analysis of online MM meetings found the most common types of communication by participants were self-disclosure, provision of information and advice, and provision of emotional support. Similar studies of depression and eating disorder support groups have found the same patterns.

== Membership ==
In a 2001 survey of Moderation Management, most MM members are white (96%), employed (81%), educated (72% have at least a college education) and on average are more secular than the rest of the population (32% identify as atheists or agnostics, only 16% regularly attend religious services). MM attracts an equal number of men and women (49% are female); depending on the kinds of meetings attended, between 11.9% and 33.8% of participants were under 35 years of age.

MM members mostly describe themselves as being non-dependent problem drinkers. In general, MM members report having a mild history of substance-abuse problems before joining, with 40% having consumed four or fewer drinks per drinking day and less than 10% experienced serious withdrawal symptoms or comorbid drug abuse.

=== Alcohol consumption of members ===
The 2001 survey saw that 87.1% of online-only members (members whose participation in Moderation Management was online only) and 61.7% of face-to-face members (people who went only to real-world face-to-face meetings) drank four or more days a week. 70.6% of online-only and 49.1% of face-to-face-only members had five or more drinks on days they drank. Among members who went to both face-to-face and online meetings, 85.4% drank four or more days a week, and 53.8% had five or more drinks on drinking days.

== Effectiveness ==
A 2009 study saw that subjects using just Moderation Management to reduce their drinking went from having only about one day a week abstinent from alcohol to having 1.5 days a week abstinent (e.g., they would drink six days one week and five days another week).

A 2012 paper argues that, while there is little scientific analysis of MM's efficacy, mutual support groups such as Moderation Management could be effective.

== History ==
Moderation Management was founded by Audrey Kishline, a problem drinker, who did not identify with the disease theory of alcoholism, finding that it eroded her self-confidence. Kishline found that she could moderate her drinking with the help of cognitive behavioral therapy principles and in 1994 created Moderation Management as an organization for non-dependent problem drinkers to help maintain moderate alcohol use. MM maintains, however, that it is not for all problem drinkers; that there are some drinkers for whom abstinence will be the only solution.

Kishline had asked many professionals for advice while she was establishing the fellowship, including psychologist Jeffrey Schaler, who wrote the foreword for the first edition of the book, Moderate Drinking, used in the organization and served on the original board of trustees for MM. Schaler split ways with MM over two issues. The first being failure of MM's leadership to condemn member Larry Froistad after he confessed to murdering his daughter on an MM support group email list. The second being a disagreement with MM as to whether there was a medical distinction between problem drinkers and alcoholics. Schaler's foreword was replaced with one by historian Ernest Kurtz in subsequent editions.

In January 2000, Kishline posted a message to an official MM email list stating that she had concluded her best drinking goal was abstinence and that she would begin attending Alcoholics Anonymous, SMART Recovery and Women for Sobriety meetings while continuing to support MM for others. In March 2000, while drunk, she drove her truck the wrong way down a highway, and hit another vehicle head-on killing its two passengers (a father and his 12-year-old daughter). MM continued to grow during Kishline's time in prison. She was released in August 2003 after serving 3½ years of her 4½ year sentence.

Kishline continued to drink once released from prison. Soon after, she divorced from her husband and struggled to find work, in part due to her felony conviction. She developed a friendship with the wife and mother of the victims of her drunk driving crash, and they authored a book together on their relationship. She died of suicide at the age of 59 on December 19, 2014.

== Literature ==
- Kishline, Audrey (December 1995). Moderate Drinking: The Moderation Management (TM) Guide for People Who Want to Reduce Their Drinking. Three Rivers Press. ISBN 978-0-517-88656-4. OCLC 33947025.
- Rotgers, Frederick; Kern, Marc F.; Hoeltzel, Rudy (September 2002). Responsible Drinking: A Moderation Management Approach for Problem Drinkers. New Harbinger Publications. ISBN 978-1-57224-294-4. OCLC 55204532.

== See also ==
- Addiction recovery groups
- Alcoholism
- Cognitive behavioral therapy
- Drug addiction
- LifeRing Secular Recovery
- Rational Recovery
- SMART Recovery
