= Christine E. Dickson =

American cognitive psychologist

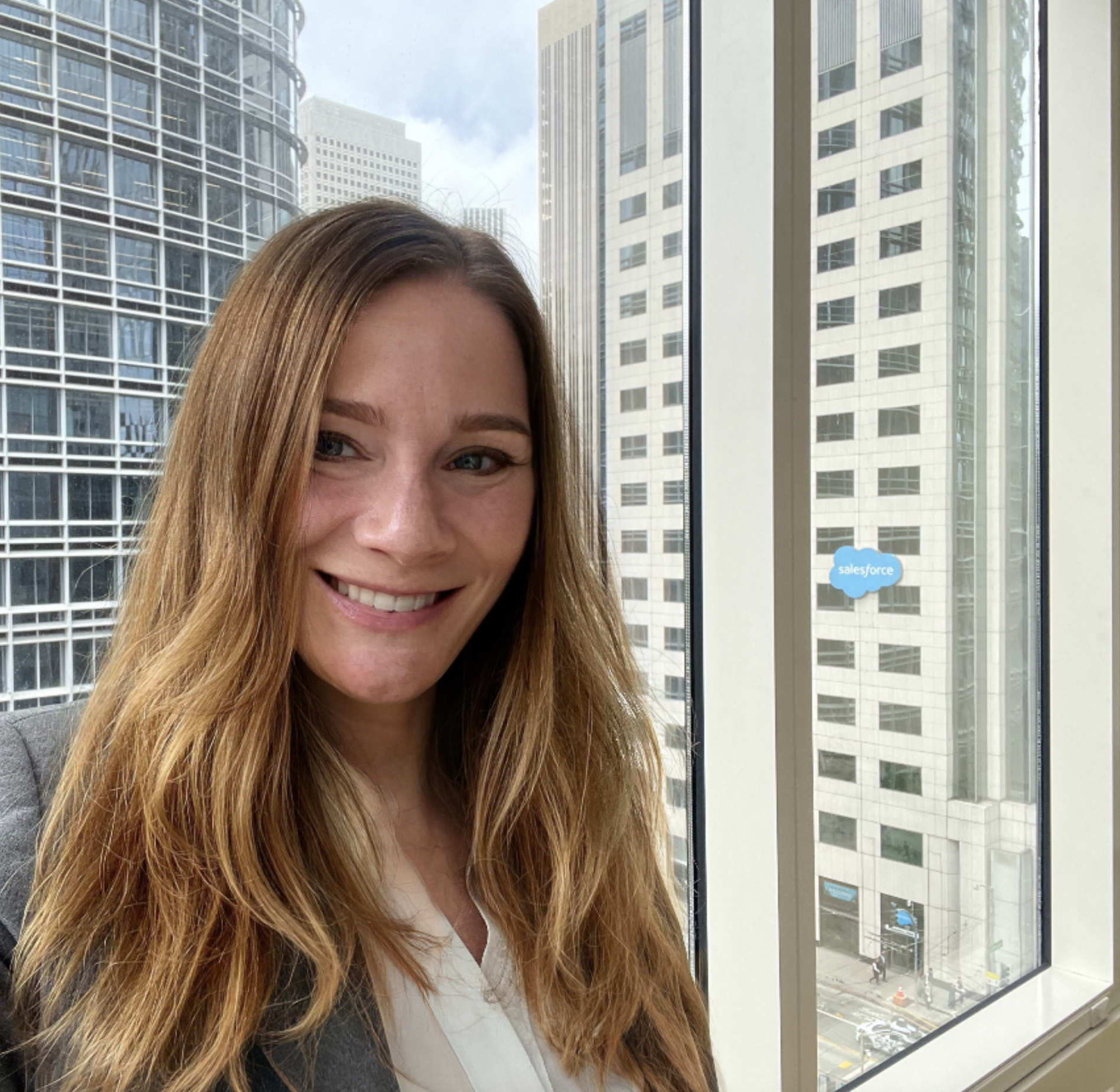
- Born: Plainfield, New Jersey
- Education: Rutgers University (B.A.) Kean College of New Jersey (M.A.) California School of Professional Psychology (M.S. / Ph.D.)
- Known for: mindfulness-based cognitive therapy
- Website: https://christinedickson.com/

Christine E. Dickson is an American clinical psychologist. For over 20 years, she has specialized in mindfulness-based cognitive therapy. She is best known for being a psychotherapist in California and appearing as a featured guest on Tri-Valley Community Television (TV30) where she provides self-help advice on topics such as mindfulness, work-family balance, marital happiness, compassion, trauma recovery, and more. Her psychotherapy practice is located in the San Francisco Bay Area.

== Education ==
Dickson received her B.A. with honors in Psychology and English Literature from Rutgers University, The State University of New Jersey in 1996, her M.A. with highest distinction in Human Behavior and Organizational Psychology from Kean College of New Jersey in 1998, and a Dual PhD in Clinical Psychology and Industrial-Organizational Psychology from the California School of Professional Psychology in 2003. Between 2003 - 2007, Dickson presented portions of her doctoral dissertation on employee perceptions of family responsibilities discrimination at 17 national and international conferences including the II International Work and Family Conference at IESE Business School in Barcelona, Spain.

== Career ==
In 2004, after obtaining her California license to practice as a clinical psychologist, Dickson worked for Wells Fargo Corporate Headquarters in San Francisco. At this job, she helped employees recover from trauma after bank robberies and coached managers to effectively respond to critical incidents in the workplace such as employee deaths, bomb threats, robberies, and employee violence. After Wells Fargo, she went on to work at the California Department of Corrections and Rehabilitation where she helped male and female clients recover from their childhood trauma, and the traumas they created for themselves and others as a result of their crimes.

Dickson left the California Department of Corrections and Rehabilitation in 2011 and went on to open her own private practice in Pleasanton where she helps pre-teens, teenagers, and adults. She also provides critical incident stress debriefing and trauma recovery counseling to Alameda County Police, BART Police and AC Transit employees.

Currently, Dickson is a psychotherapist who works online and in person providing individual therapy, couples counseling, and executive coaching. Dickson also focuses on corporate work, more specifically the business and legal cases for workplace flexibility.

Dickson also has a blog where she has posted over 100 self-help articles. In 2015, Dickson trained executives on improving their Emotional Intelligence, by guest lecturing at the University of Southern California (USC), Price School of Public Policy, Masters of Executive Leadership Program. One interest Dickson has is women's rights in the workplace. Dickson was an activist with 9to5, National Association of Working Women in 2007 and spoke with members of the California State Legislature in support of Senate Bill 836, which planned to amend the California Fair Employment and Housing Act to prohibit employment discrimination based on a worker's familial status. At the California State Capitol she spoke to the legislature about her research on employment discrimination against working mothers and fathers.

== Published work ==
Dickson's doctoral dissertation entitled, "Antecedents and Consequences of Perceived Family Responsibilities Discrimination in the Workplace" completed in 2003 was published in a special work-life edition of the Psychologist Manager Journal in 2008. Her study was the first to measure family responsibilities discrimination (FRD) and to test a model of the antecedents and consequences of FRD. Dickson's research revealed how employee perceptions of discrimination based on their family responsibilities (childcare, eldercare, or the care of an ill spouse or relative) had negative outcomes for the companies bottom-line. She also showed how companies can prevent family responsibilities discrimination (FRD) by creating family supportive workplace cultures, training supervisors to be supportive of employees' personal and family responsibilities, and by providing flexible work schedules and childcare supports.

In 2007, Dickson published a paper, titled "Avoiding family responsibilities discrimination: EAPs can help employers understand and mitigate the risks of discrimination against workers with family responsibilities," in a special edition of the Journal of Employee Assistance. Dickson wrote about how Employee Assistance Programs can help employers mitigate the risk of Family Responsibilities Discrimination (FRD) at work. She stated that the increase in FRD poses a risk to employers because it can decrease employee productivity and increase litigation. Dickson stated that no federal law prohibits workplace discrimination against employees with family responsibilities. At the end of her article she provided practical strategies to decrease employee perceptions of FRD at work such as increasing the number of Employee Assistance Programs (EAP).

In 2014, Dickson published an article on workplace flexibility entitled "Negotiating a Flexible Work Schedule]." In her article, Dickson states, "People more than ever want flexibility. It is my hope that employees will start demanding flexibility as a condition of employment. This article provides practical tips and suggestions for employees and job seekers on how to negotiate a flexible work schedule." Her article explains that if schedules are more flexible, employees will be more motivated to perform. She then concludes her article by explaining how to negotiate a flexible work schedule.

== Early life ==
Dickson was raised in Middlesex, New Jersey, a small working class community 30 miles west of New York City. Her mother was a homemaker and her father was a chemist. She is the eldest of two children and is of English, Irish, German and Polish descent. Dickson attended the Middlesex Bible Chapel, a non-denominational Christian church from age 5 to 16. When she was 9 years old, her neighbors and close family friends who also attended the Middlesex Bible Chapel were murdered when an explosive gasoline fueled pipe bomb, disguised as a package was delivered to their home and detonated. No motive was found for the crime and the homicides are considered a cold case. For several months following the bombing, Dickson and her family were under FBI protection due to safety concerns and their home phone was wiretapped for 3 years. Dickson's father started and administered a fund to provide financial support to the victim's children.

== Personal life ==
Dickson is a lifelong vegetarian. She resides in the San Francisco Bay Area.

== Bibliography ==
- Dickson, C. E. (2007). Avoiding family responsibilities discrimination: EAPs can help employers understand and mitigate the risks of discrimination against workers with family responsibilities. Journal of Employee Assistance, 37(2), 16+. Retrieved from Gale OneFile: Psychology - Document - Avoiding family responsibilities discrimination: EAPs can help employers understand and mitigate the risks of discrimination against workers with family responsibilities
- Dickson, C. E. (2008). Antecedents and Consequences of Perceived Family Responsibilities Discrimination in the Workplace. Psychologist-Manager Journal, Vol. 11, Issue 1, (p. 113 - 140.) Retrieved from Antecedents and Consequences of Perceived Family Responsibilities Discrimination in the Workplace
- Sussex Directories Inc. Psychology Today. (2016). Dr. Christine E. Dickson PhD. Retrieved from: Dr. Christine Dickson: Pleasanton Psychologist, Psychologist, Pleasanton, CA, 94566
- Dickson, C. E. (2014). Negotiating a Flexible Working Schedule. Retrieved from Negotiating a Flexible Work Schedule
- Dickson, C. E. (2014). The Legal Case for Work-Life Balance Policies. Retrieved from
- Tri-Valley Psychotherapy. (2011). Christine Dickson, PhD. Retrieved from Christine E. Dickson, PhD
