= Marc Kern =

American psychologist

- Born: January 16, 1948 (age 77); Long Beach, California, U.S.
- Citizenship: United States
- Education: Psychologist
- Alma mater: Ohio State University, B.S. Wayne State University, M.A. California School of Professional Psychology, Ph.D.
- Occupations: Addiction treatment psychologist, self-help author
- Known for: Alternative addiction treatment specialist
- Awards: SHARE Foundation Award, for Outstanding Contribution to Self-Help in Los Angeles, 2001-2002
- Website: Addiction Alternatives; Habit Doc

Dr. Marc Kern is an American psychologist, whose Los Angeles-based practice is focused on substance abuse and addiction treatment. In 2013 he and Adi Jaffe, Ph.D. founded Addiction Alternatives, a Beverly Hills-based addiction treatment program.

Kern began as a professional architect, then returned to college, becoming a licensed clinical psychologist in California. He is also a Certified Addiction Specialist, a Certified Rational Addictions Therapist, and is certified by the American Psychological Association in the Treatment of Alcohol and Other Psychoactive Substance Use Disorders. Dr. Kern was one of the founding members of SMART Recovery, Rational Recovery, and Moderation Management.

== Books by Dr. Marc Kern ==
- Take Control, Now!, Life Management Skills, Inc, 1994
- Responsible Drinking, New Harbinger Publications, 2002
