= Framo =

Framo may refer to:

- Framo AS, a Norwegian supplier of submerged cargo pumps
- Framo (car), a former German automobile brand

== People with the surname Framo ==
- James Framo (1922–2001), American family therapist
