= AVRT =

AVRT may refer to:

- Addictive Voice Recognition Technique, a technique used in Rational Recovery
- Atrioventricular reentrant tachycardia
