= Murder of Amanda Froistad =

1995 murder of a child in North Dakota, United States

The murder occurred in North Dakota (red).

In 1995, Larry Froistad murdered his five-year-old daughter, Amanda Froistad. After he set their North Dakota home on fire while she was inside, Larry confessed to the crime on an email list with 200 members. Only a few reported him. This incident is an example of an online version of the bystander effect.

In addition, the incident was a notable failure of child welfare. Though a therapist reported that Larry had sexually abused Amanda, the authorities of South Dakota, where the therapist practiced, and of North Dakota, where Amanda lived, did not coordinate with each other and failed to protect her.

== Background ==
In mid-1994, Amanda's aggressive conduct at daycare concerned her providers. Amanda's mother, Ann Purdy, took her to a counselor to find out why she was acting that way. The first thing Amanda told the counselor was that she was being molested by her father, Larry Froistad. The counselor, as required by law, reported the molestation to South Dakota's Child Welfare Agency.

== Incident ==
On May 31, 1995, a heavily inebriated Larry Froistad set his Bowman County home on fire while five-year-old Amanda Froistad was trapped inside. He then climbed out the window. His daughter started screaming; after a while, the screams stopped. Larry then entered the house again, picked up his daughter, and ascertained that she was still alive before climbing back out the window, leaving Amanda in the burning house. He then called the police and pretended to be upset over his daughter's death. Even though the death seemed unusual, the police did not prosecute Larry because the police personally knew Larry and could not believe he would murder someone.

== Confession ==
In 1998, Froistad posted a confession of his murder on an online email list. There were many different responses to his email. Some said it was a long time ago and some said he was fantasizing this as a result of feeling guilt over his divorce. Only three of the approximately 200 members of the email list reported the confession to legal authorities. The incident has been studied as an online version of the bystander effect.

Larry Froistad had also confessed to molesting his daughter to an online group of pedophiles.

== Sentencing ==
In a plea deal, Larry Froistad pleaded guilty to both murder and child molestation. He was sentenced to 30 years of prison time, eligible for parole in 2024. As of 2026, he is still in prison.

== Reaction ==
Author Jeffrey Schaler expressed dismay over the failure of leadership of the online group Larry confessed on (a group called Moderation Management for people with drinking problems who try to drink moderately) to condemn member Larry Froistad after he admitted his murder in 1998. Because of the Froistad murder and subsequent controversy, Schaler recommended that psychiatrists let their patients know early on that knowledge of a felony involving direct harm to others would cause the presumption of doctor patient confidentiality to be waived.
