= The 13th Step =

2016 American documentary film

- Directed by: Monica Richardson
- Produced by: Monica Richardson; Michael Kuehnert
- Cinematography: Edwin Stevens
- Edited by: Barry Rubinow
- Production company: Inwood Girl Productions
- Distributed by: Proven Entertainment
- Release dates: 2015 (Cannes Doc Corner); 2016 (U.S.)
- Running time: 52 minutes
- Country: United States
- Language: English

The 13th Step is a 2016 American documentary film directed and produced by Monica Richardson that examines predatory behavior, court-ordered attendance of violent and sexual offenders, and coerced participation in Alcoholics Anonymous (AA). The film was selected for the Documentary Corner at the Cannes Film Festival in 2015 and won the Jury Award for Best Documentary at the Beverly Hills Film Festival the same year. It received fiscal sponsorship from the International Documentary Association.

== Background ==
The title refers to "thirteenth stepping," a colloquial term within twelve-step programs describing predatory behavior in which experienced members exploit newcomers who are vulnerable due to their early recovery status. A 2003 study in the Journal of Addictions Nursing found that at least 50 percent of women surveyed in AA had experienced seven of thirteen thirteenth-stepping behaviors identified by researchers.

Richardson, a former AA member of 36 years, left the organization in the early 2010s after what she described as failed efforts to address safety concerns within AA. She began production on the documentary in May 2011, traveling across the United States to interview victims and former AA board members.

== Synopsis ==
The film centers on the 2010 killings of Kristine Cass, 46, and her 13-year-old daughter Saundra Cass in Honolulu, Hawaii, by Clayborne Conley, a former Hawaii National Guardsman with a history of violent behavior and mental instability who was Cass's former boyfriend. The film presents the case as an example of the dangers posed by the lack of safety protocols in AA settings. Richardson's five-year investigation into the case led to broader findings about courts ordering violent and sexual offenders to attend AA meetings without the knowledge of other members.

The documentary features interviews with experts including psychoanalyst Lance Dodes, author of The Sober Truth; journalist Gabrielle Glaser, author of Her Best-Kept Secret: Why Women Drink—and How They Can Regain Control; psychologist Rachel Bernstein; and Tom Horvath, president of SMART Recovery.

The film also documents the case of Karla Brada, who was murdered by Eric Allen Earl, a man she met in AA who had 22 years of criminal activity and 52 prior court orders to attend the program.

The documentary examines the broader issues of court-ordered AA attendance, the lack of background checks or safety regulations within AA meetings, and the availability of evidence-based alternatives to twelve-step programs such as SMART Recovery and SOS.

== Production ==
The film was funded in part through crowdfunding that raised over $24,000 and through tax-deductible donations facilitated by the International Documentary Association's fiscal sponsorship program.

== Release and reception ==
The 13th Step was exhibited in the Documentary Corner at the Cannes Film Festival in 2015. It won the Jury Award for Best Documentary at the 15th Annual Beverly Hills Film Festival in May 2015. The film was released on Amazon Prime Video in 2016 and subsequently became available on Tubi and other streaming platforms.

In May 2015, the film was screened at a London Mayfair hotel.

Richardson appeared on Katie, the Katie Couric talk show, to discuss the film and her experiences. Her story was also featured in Her Best-Kept Secret: Why Women Drink—and How They Can Regain Control (2013), a New York Times bestseller by journalist Gabrielle Glaser, which discussed thirteenth stepping and Richardson's experiences.

== Related work ==
Richardson hosts the podcast Safe Recovery, which has produced over 350 episodes examining issues in substance use treatment including predatory behavior in twelve-step programs, alternatives to AA, and advocacy for regulatory reform.

In 2023, New Hampshire Public Radio produced a separate, unrelated investigative podcast also titled The 13th Step, reported by Lauren Chooljian, which investigated sexual misconduct allegations at New Hampshire's largest addiction treatment network. The podcast was featured on NPR's Embedded.

Richardson has also commented on the Human Intervention Motivation Study (HIMS), a Federal Aviation Administration substance abuse monitoring program that mandates participation in Alcoholics Anonymous as a condition of pilot medical certification, characterizing the program as reliant on "an antiquated, religious self-help group founded in the 1930s."

== See also ==
- Alcoholics Anonymous
- Twelve-step program
- Thirteenth Step – 2003 album by A Perfect Circle referencing the same recovery terminology
- SMART Recovery
- Human Intervention Motivation Study
- The Sober Truth
