= Chemung County Historical Society =

Coordinates: 42°5′19.5″N 76°48′2″W

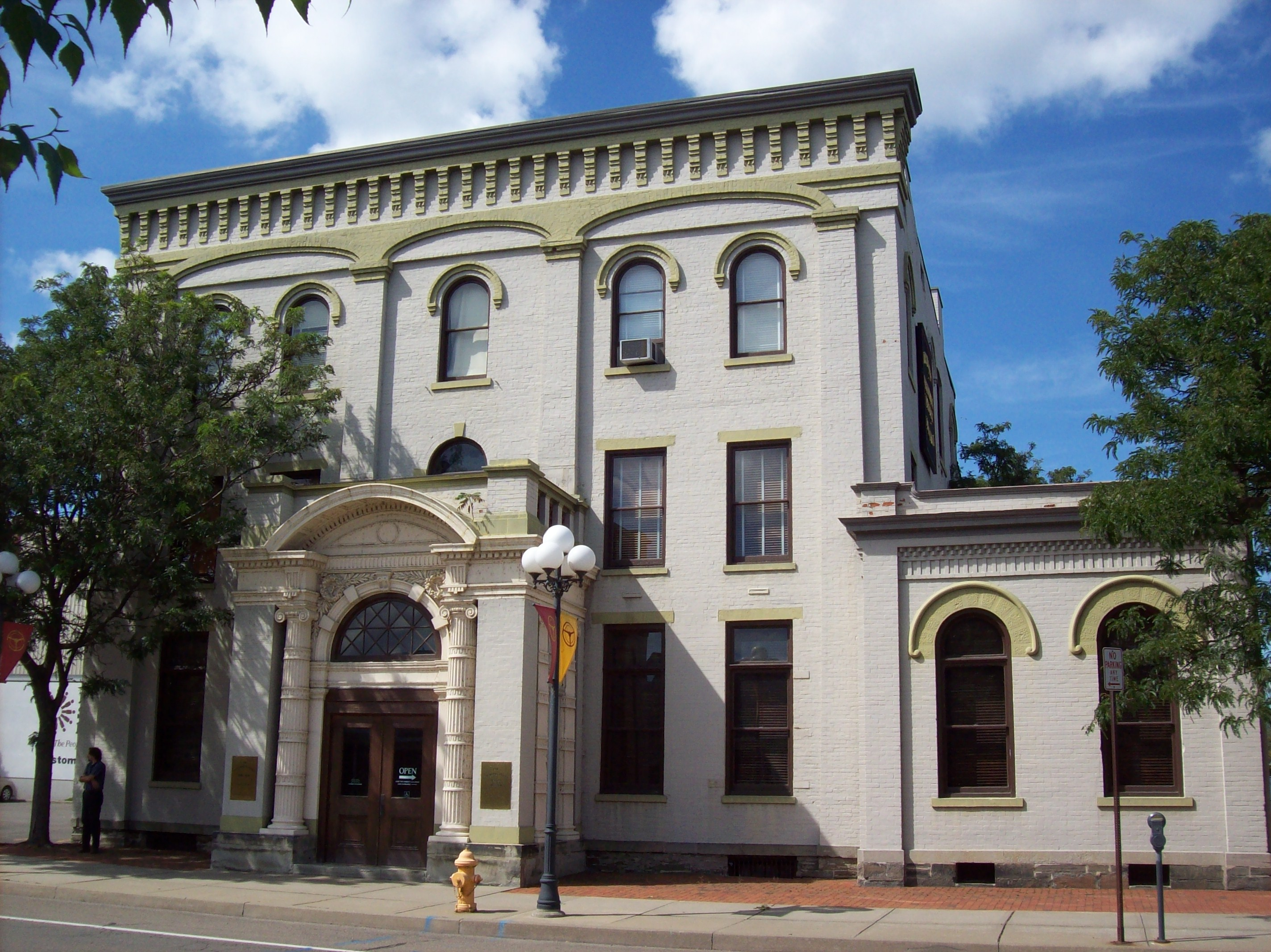
- Established: 1923
- Location: 415 East Water Street; Elmira, New York
- Accreditation: American Alliance of Museums
- Website: Official website

The Chemung County Historical Society is headquartered in the historic Chemung Canal Bank Building in Elmira, New York. It is dedicated to the collection, preservation, and presentation of the history of the Chemung River Valley region. The society was founded in 1923 and first chartered by New York State in 1947. It is accredited by the American Alliance of Museums, and currently operates two cultural repositories, the Chemung Valley History Museum and the Booth Library, both as non-profit educational institutions.

== History of the society ==
In early November 1923, following a meeting of the Sons of the American Revolution, Dr. Arthur W. Booth, President of the local chapter, recommended that a historical association be founded within Elmira to preserve many of historical documents and other items found throughout the city for future generations. At this preliminary meeting to form this new historical society, Dr. Arthur W. Booth, who presented the society's new proposed Constitution and By Laws, and was joined by Harry Hoffman, Chester Howell, Jabin Secor, Harrison Chapman, Joseph H. Pierce, H. H. Bickford, and Edward B. Billings. Following this, the society was organized by volunteers who formed small archival and artifact collections.

In 1947, the society was chartered by New York State and, in 1977, the Board of Trustees reorganized their by-laws. At this time, it was also agreed upon that the society needed to expand and into a bigger space to meet their educational, curatorial, and administrative needs. The former Chemung Canal Bank building at 415 East Water Street was selected, both for its space and its historical value. After seventeen years of planning and a National Endowment for the Humanities Challenge Grant, renovations to the museum and head office building were completed in 1993. During the renovation process, the society was first accredited by the American Alliance of Museums in 1986. The society was re-accredited by the American Alliance of Museums in 1999. At present the society has five staff positions. The society also has members from across the United States and in Canada.

== Location ==
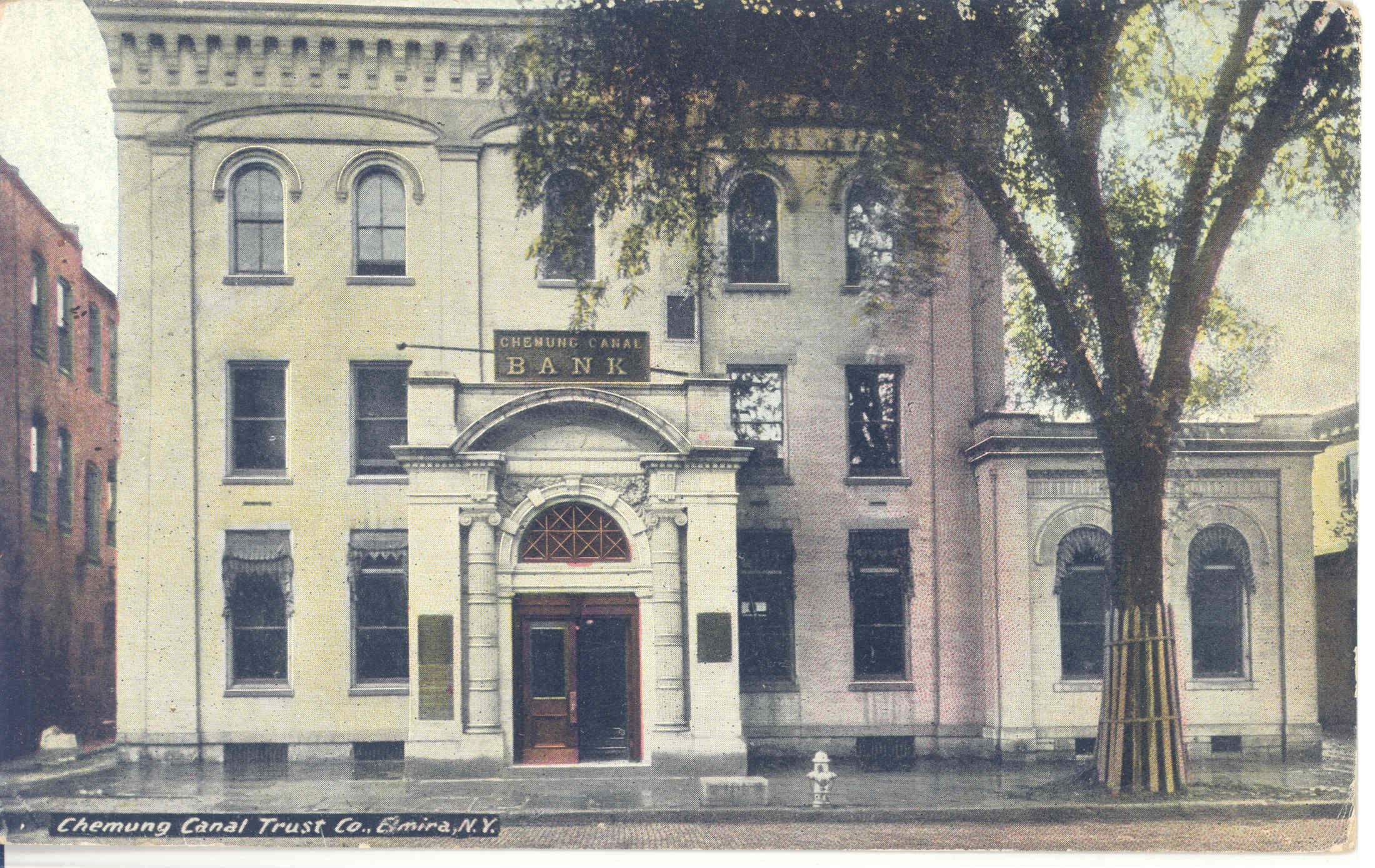
Postcard of the Original Exterior of the Chemung Canal Bank

The Chemung County Historical Society is located at 415 East Water Street in Elmira, New York in the former Chemung Canal Bank Building. The society operates two facilities in that building: the Chemung Valley History Museum, located on the first floor, and the Booth Library and archival repository, located on the second floor. From 1834 until 1920, the current museum building served as the Chemung Canal Bank headquarters and then as various offices, notably the Sayles-Evans law office. The building is listed on the National Register of Historic Places. It originally had two and a half stories, and a third story was added in 1868. The building is a brick structure with stepped gables, which is notable, as most of the buildings at the time in Elmira were made of wood. The bank expressed a Greek revival idiom with transitional Federal-style elements. The entrance to the building was a stone stoop with steps adorned with an ornamental wrought iron railing. The building was remodeled in 1903 by the architectural firm Pierce and Bickford when the Chemung Canal Bank merged with the Elmira Trust Company. In December 1920, the Chemung Canal Trust Company moved to a new facility and the Bank building came under the ownership of the Arnot Realty Company.

== Collections and exhibits ==
At the heart of the Chemung County Historical Society lies its collection of documents, photographs, books, maps, and artifacts. Currently the three-dimensional collection consists of more than 18,000 artifacts including a large textile collection.

=== Chemung Valley History Museum ===
The Chemung Valley History Museum generally has upwards of 200 items on display, slightly less than 2% of the total collection. Popular items found in the collection include many items pertaining to Mark Twain's life, the mammoth tusk, and a wide variety of items related to the American Civil War. There are four main gallery spaces in the museum: The Bank Gallery, The Brick Barn Gallery, The Howell Gallery, and the Frances Brayton Education Room. The long-term exhibit which was redone in early 2014, located in the Bank Gallery, which features an overview of Chemung County history and an in-depth view of Mark Twain's Elmira. The Barn and Howell Galleries are home to the museum's rotating exhibits which change several times a year.

=== The Booth Library ===
The Booth Library contains more than a million items, including 2,500 books, 14,000 photographs, 30,000 manuscripts, and 11,000 maps, and architectural records. These collections date from the late eighteenth century to the present and include personal papers of Chemung Valley residents, resources concerning Mark Twain's life in Elmira, published regional histories, documents related to the American Civil War, resources concerning the Abolitionist Movement and the Underground Railroad in the Chemung Valley region, along with many more resources pertaining to daily life within Chemung County.

== Accomplishments and awards ==
The Chemung County Historical Society has earned many grants, achievements and awards. These include a 14-year grant cycle with the state arts council’s Arts-In-Education division for programming in rural school districts, a 20-year grant cycle with the Institute of Museum and Library Services for general operating support funds, a National Endowment for the Humanities challenge grant, and in 2005 a Save Our History grant from The History Channel. The society also received a Certificate of Commendation for the exhibit "Til Death Do Us Part: Wedding and Funeral Traditions in Chemung County" in 2013 from MuseumWise.

The American Association for State and Local History has given their Award of Merit and Certificate of Commendation for Chemung Valley History Museum exhibitions and programs including: A Heritage Uncovered: the Black Experience in Upstate New York; Outsiders All: Nineteenth Century Prisons, Mental Hospitals and Asylums; and The High Line: A City Divided, A City United. The Historical Society has also received an Award of Merit from the Upstate History Alliance for the Chemung Historical Journal in 2003 and the exhibit Never Done: Women and Work in Chemung County, 1880-1920 in 2010.

A National Award of Merit was presented to the society from the Retirement Research Foundation for the video, A Heritage Uncovered, and its subsequent broadcast on PBS Television Network. The Chemung Valley History Museum is accredited by the American Alliance of Museums and was selected as one of six Mid-Atlantic region museums to participate in their National Interpretation Project in 1999–2000.

== Publications ==
- Banknotes: The Newsletter of the Chemung County Historical Society. OCLC 30952942.
- Chemung County Historical Society Museum : dedication May 15, 1982. OCLC 54432376.
- Elmira Star-Gazette; Chemung County Historical Society (2001). Chemung County memories: the early years. Pediment Pub. OCLC 54780290.
- Chemung County Historical Society (1980). List of Confederate soldiers buried in Woodlawn Cemetery, Elmira, New York. OCLC 7139424.
- The Chemung Historical Journal. ISSN 0528-9599. OCLC 3467034.
