= Kevin F. McCready =

American psychologist (1957–2004)

Kevin F. McCready (January 30, 1957 – December 5, 2004) was a clinical psychologist in Fresno, California. He was the founder and director of the San Joaquin Psychotherapy Center and the non-profit Recovery for Emotionally Abused Children (R.E.A.Ch.).

Born on January 30, 1957, McCready was from Boston, Massachusetts, and graduated with a bachelor's degree from George Washington University, a Masters from State University of New York, and a Doctorate from California School of Professional Psychology in Fresno, California. He served as president of the San Joaquin Psychotherapy Association and California Association of Psychology Providers and was on the executive board for the National Coalition of Mental Health Professionals and Consumers and International Center for the Study of Psychiatry and Psychology (ICSPP).

He served on the faculty of both the California School of Professional Psychology at Alliant International University and American Commonwealth University. As a Jungian-oriented psychotherapist, he developed the integrative milieu model of psychotherapy.

Of Irish descent, he was a devout practicing member of the Catholic Church, was married to Karin McCready and had two children. He died on December 5, 2004, from a heart attack. The ICSPP created the Kevin McCready Memorial Research Grant in his honor.

== San Joaquin Psychotherapy Center ==
McCready opened San Joaquin Psychotherapy Center in Fresno, California in 1990, developing a day treatment program based on his integrative milieu model. The center had a unique treatment philosophy, combining elements of psychodynamic theory, humanistic philosophy, and an anti-psychiatric approach. McCready was opposed to use of the medical model in psychology and was an outspoken critic of the use of diagnosis, electroshock, and psychiatric drugs in psychotherapy treatment. Clients came from all over the world to receive non-medicated psychotherapy and to titrate off of psychiatric drugs.

McCready wanted to open other sites offering the same services with the same philosophy all over the world. He started by opening San Francisco Bay Psychotherapy Center in San Francisco in 2004. He planned to open sites in New York City and Chicago soon after. However, following his death in December 2004, the doors closed due to financial difficulty in both San Francisco and in Fresno. Under Dr. McCready and Dr. Popper's supervision and program design, Associated Psychological Health Services was opened north of Chicago in Sheboygan, Wisconsin, under the clinical direction of Dr. Toby Tyler Watson, a past student intern at the San Joaquin Psychotherapy Center.

The Sequoia Psychotherapy Center, Inc. was opened in Fresno, California, in March 2005, by Dr. Mark D. Popper (Dr. Kevin McCready's Assistant Clinical Director from 1991 to 2004), K. Brent Olsen, and Pepe Santana. Sequoia Psychotherapy Center was incorporated in order to continue the work of the San Joaquin Psychotherapy Center soon after it closed. It is a community-based psychotherapy services center offering traditional outpatient psychotherapy, psychological testing, and a day treatment program based on McCready's Milieu model.
