= CCTC =

CCTC may refer to:

- California Commission on Teacher Credentialing, an independent agency created in 1970 by the Ryan Act
- Canadian Council for Tobacco Control, a registered Canadian charity
- Chaozhou Three-Circle, Chinese Electronic components and Advanced materials company
- Chemung Canal Trust Company, a New York State chartered trust company based in Elmira, New York, USA
- Churches of Christ Theological College, the national ministry and theological teaching college for the Conference of Churches of Christ in Australia
- Current Cost To Company.
