= Reiko True =

Japanese American psychologist

Reiko Homma True (born 1933) is an internationally known Japanese American psychologist. True is Professor Emeritus of Psychology at Alliant International University in San Francisco, CA. She is recognized for her efforts to advance mental health services for Asian Americans and other minorities. She conducts research studies examining mental attitudes and status among minorities in the community, and publishes her research in reputable psychological journals.

== Early life in Japan ==
True was born in Japan to a large family in 1933. True grew up in Niigata, Japan. Her family moved to Shanghai during World War II, following her father who served as a civilian in the Japanese Army. At the end of the war her family returned to Niigata.

When True was 17 years old, 1950, her mother died as a result of a domestic violence incident. During high school she was involved with community activities through her church, volunteering in orphanages, prisons and senior centers.

She was accepted to a university in Tokyo in 1949. She was part of only the 3rd year of women being accepted into the college. She was one of only three women in her class of eighty students. She double majored in International Relations and English. Reiko True was unable to find a job after she competed her studies and shared that this was the first time she had encountered discrimination because she was female.

== Life in the United States ==
In the spring of 1958, True moved to San Francisco, CA. She applied and was accepted to the Social Work graduate program at University of California, Berkeley. In 1964, she graduated and began working at a psychiatric outpatient clinic in Oakland, CA. There, she met a supervisor named Mary Edwards (otherwise known as Mary Goulding), who got True involved in activist work. Initially, True focused on Japanese newcomer women who were married to American servicemen. She noticed that they "were often isolated and had trouble adjusting to the [United States]." Working with a Japanese social worker, she established a self-help support group for these women called the Himawari (sunflower) group. Afterward, she continued to work with other activists to create and advocate for health, mental health, and social service agencies for Asian American communities.

In 1972, True decided to return to graduate school at the California School of Professional Psychology (CSPP). She received funding from the National Institute of Mental Health (NIMH) and was able to study psychology with a focus on minority mental health issues. During her time at CSPP, she began meeting with a group of like-minded Asian American women. In 1976, they decided to start teaching the Psychology of Asian American Women as an Asian American Studies course at UC Berkeley.

After finishing her graduate studies at CSPP, True joined the Region IX office of NIMH in San Francisco where she worked to help community groups and the local governments of Nevada and Arizona develop community mental health centers. She worked there for five years and decided to accept a position as Deputy Director at San Francisco Community Mental Health Services in order to continue working with local community groups. In 1985, she was appointed to the position of Director of Community Mental Health Services and Substance Abuse Services.

== Career ==
True's career, which spans over 25 years, has been devoted to the advancement of minority affairs. True was one of the proponents of cultural and linguistic appropriate mental health services in the California bay area. In 1996, she retired from the Public Health department. For the following nine years, she trained master's level psychology students as part of the Clinical Psychology Master's Program in Tokyo, Japan. She currently practices psychology part-time in San Francisco, CA. Her practice caters to non-English speaking populations and minorities from Japantown in San Francisco. Besides her career as a practicing clinical psychologist, True has served the psychological community in many ways. She served on the Community on Women in 2012, she was the first female director of the Mental Health Substance Abuse and Forensic Services for the San Francisco Department of Public Health, the President of the Asian American Psychological Association from 1997–1999, and she served the Asian American Community Mental Health Program in Oakland, CA.

== Humanitarian efforts ==
True worked extensively in developing and training others in mental health disaster assistance. She helped organize disaster mental health assistance for the residents of San Francisco after San Francisco was hit by the Loma Prieta Earthquake in 1989. Later, she went to Japan to provide mental health assistance to disaster victims after the Kansai-Awaji Earthquake in 1995. For six months, she trained mental health professionals on disaster mental health assistance as a visiting Fulbright Senior Scholar at Kobe University Medical School. Similarly, she later worked with the Japanese Community and Cultural Center of Northern California (JCCCNC) to train Japanese disaster workers in San Francisco in disaster mental health assistance. She continued with her disaster assistance work in 2011 after the Tohoku Region Disaster when she organized mental health disaster training for a select group of workers from the affected Tohoku region.

== Research contributions ==
True's research focus is on different minority groups such as the Asian American, Japanese American, and other South East Asian communities that exist within the United States. Her research includes examining privacy and confidentiality as it relates to psychotherapy. Among the focuses of the study were the procedures in place that govern how informed consent is obtained and the federal requirements for guarding confidentiality. The study also looked at third-party insurance, specifically Medicaid, and how insurance records are kept and whether or not those records are more vulnerable than other institutions with access to confidential information. The study found weak points in the safety of patient confidential information and made recommendations for professional conduct regarding confidentiality as it relates to psychotherapy as a result. True also contributed to an interview sample survey of adult residents of San Francisco's Chinatown. The researchers studied Chinese Americans' use of mental health services and discovered that although the prevalence of mental health disorders in Chinatown was high, only 5% of participants indicated they had utilized any mental health services. The study found that this phenomenon was not caused by negative stereotypes surrounding mental illness, but rather, Chinese Americans' unawareness of the services available.

== Accolades, honors, and positions ==
True received a number of awards and held many important positions of power during her more than 25 years of work in psychology and mental health advocacy efforts for minorities.

- 1972: True was a founding member of the Asian American Psychological Association.
- 1980: True was a leading member responsible for the creation of the American Psychological Association's Board of Ethnic Minority Affairs.
- 1984: True was the vice chair of the American Psychological Association's Committee on Women in Psychology.
- 1990: True received the American Psychological Association Distinguished Contributions Award for her contributions to Asian American/ Pacific Islander psychological issues in the areas of scholarship, practice, and leadership.
- 1997 to 1999: True was the president of the Asian American Psychological Association.
- 1999: True became a distinguished recipient of the American Psychological Association's Committee on Women in Psychology Leadership Award for her advocacy work for women's mental health and people of color.
- 2001: True was recognized as an Outstanding Alumnae by the Japanese American Women Alumnae of UC Berkeley.
- 2002: True received the Asian American Psychological Association Okura Community Leadership Award. True was the first recipient of this award, which was created to recognize a leader of the Asian American community in the fields of psychology, social work, psychiatry, and others.
- 2003: True was awarded the Asian American Psychological Association Lifetime Achievement Award, for her long-term contributions to the field of Asian American Psychology for over 25 years.
- 2014: True received the Society for the Psychology of Women Distinguished Mentor Award, which recognized her contribution to community engagement and mentorship. This award is presented at the APA Annual Convention.

== Published work ==
- True, R. H. (1976). "Characteristics of contrasting Chinatowns 2". Oakland, California. Social Casework, 57(3), 155-159.
- True, R. H. (1990). "Psychotherapeutic Issues with Asian American Women". Sex Roles: A Journal of Research, 22(7-8), 477-86. doi:10.1007/BF00288165.
- True, R. H. (August 1999). "Gender and Power in Affluent Asia" (book review) (Undetermined). Sex Roles: A Journal of Research, 41(3/4), 309–311. doi:10.1023/A:1018814531014.
- Yoshito, K., & True, R. H. (November 2002). "Harry Goichi Yamaguchi (1921-2002)". American Psychologist, 57(11), 986. doi:10.1037/0003-066X.57.11.986.
- True, R. H. (2008). "Feminist Therapy for Asian American Women?" Psychology of Women Quarterly, 32(2), 219–220. doi:10.1111/j.1471-6402.2008.00426_1.x
- True, R. and Nishizawa, N. (2015). "ACT in Japan: Bridging Cultures to Help Families Raise Children Without Violence". Psychology Benefits Society.
- Homma-True, R. (2017). "Feminist Psychology and Psychotherapy: A Personal Journey". Women & Therapy, 40(3/4: "Radical Visionaries: Feminist Therapy Pioneers 1970–-1975"), 427–441. doi:10.1080/02703149.2017.1241584.
