= Paul Hersey =

American academic (1931–2012)

Dr Paul H. Hersey
- Born: January 26, 1931; Brooklyn, New York
- Died: December 18, 2012 (aged 81)
- Occupations: Author, Professional speaker, Consultant, Management expert
- Spouse: Suzanne Carole Luellen

Paul Hersey (January 26, 1931–December 18, 2012) was a behavioral scientist and entrepreneur. He was best known for conceiving Situational Leadership. Hersey published Management of Organization Behavior, which is now in its ninth edition.

Hersey taught about training and development in leadership, management, and selling. He was also a consultant to industrial, government, and military organizations.

Hersey was born in 1931 to Ralph Emerson Hersey and Beatrice Bromell. He was a Distinguished Professor of Leadership Studies at Nova Southeastern University. He had been a faculty member of Northern Illinois University, California State University, Chico, University of Arkansas, and Ohio University. He also served in the roles of Chairman of the Department of Management and Dean of the School of Business. Hersey had also served as Project Director for the Industrial Relations Center of the University of Chicago, Training Director at Kaiser Aluminum & Chemical Company, and Department Head at Sandia Corporation.

Hersey's works included Management of Organizational Behavior: Utilizing Human Resources, Organizational Change through Effective Leadership and Selling: A Behavioral Science Approach. His most recent books included The Situational Leader, Situational Selling, Situational Service: Customer Care for the Practitioner, and Situational Parenting.

Hersey contributed to the Isolobella lecture series at Alliant International University in San Diego, hosted by Symlog. He received degrees from various institutions including a Doctorate of Education from the University of Massachusetts Amherst, M.B.A. Degrees from the Universities of Arkansas and Chicago, and a B.S. Degree from Seton Hall University.

In the 1960s, Hersey established the Center for Leadership Studies, which provides training in Situational Leadership, as well as Situational Coaching, Parenting, and Selling. Hersey credits Douglas McGregor and Carl Rogers as being foundational to his early thinking on management and leadership.

Hersey married his wife Suzanne in 1968 in Pleasants, West Virginia. and was known colloquially as 'Doc'.

== See also ==
- Situational leadership theory
