= Sekisui Chemical =

Japanese plastics manufacturer

Sekisui Chemical Company, Limited

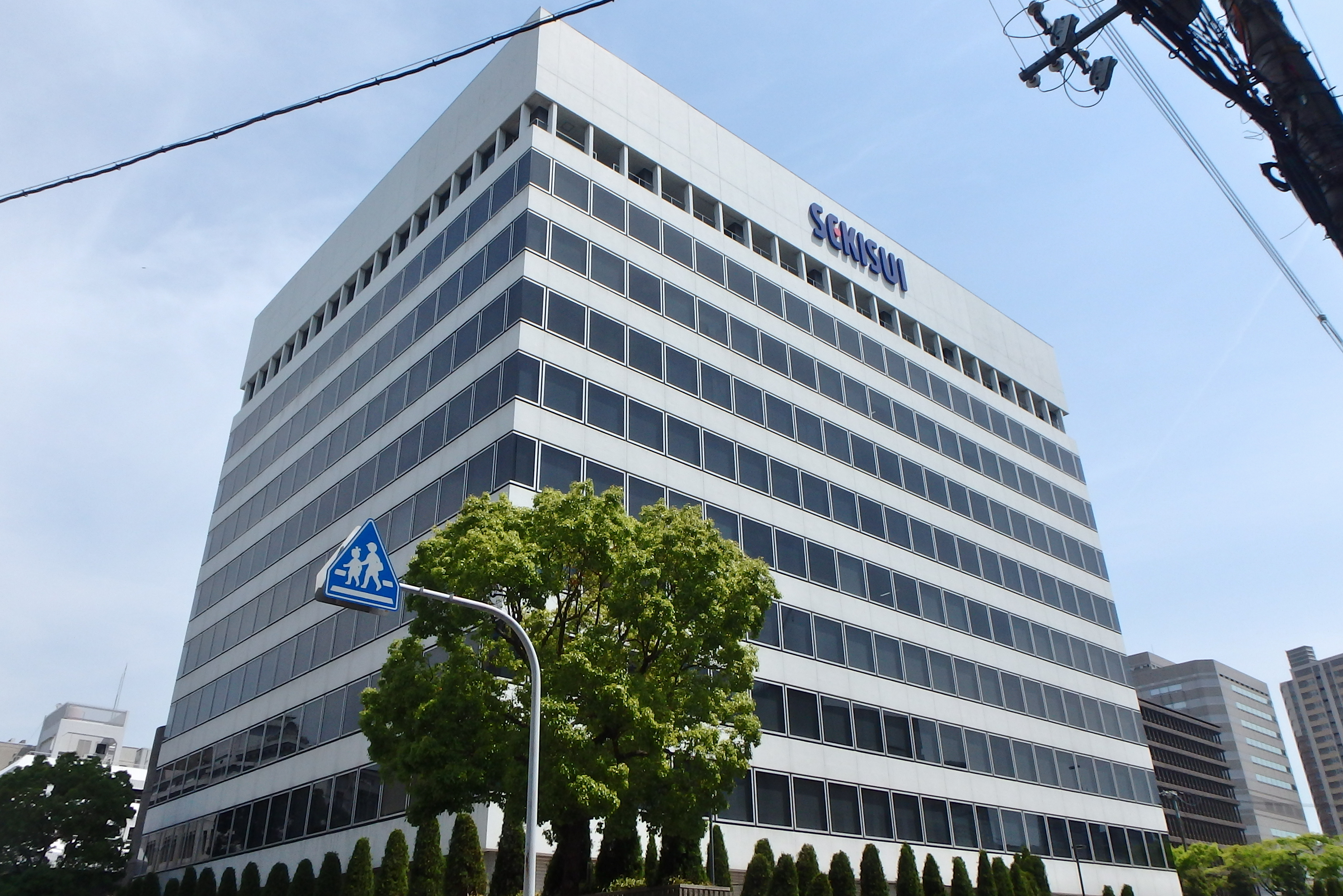
- Native name: 積水化学工業株式会社
- Romanized name: Sekisui Kagaku Kōgyō kabushiki gaisha
- Company type: Public KK
- Traded as: TYO: 4204
- Industry: Chemical, Medical, Plastics, Other
- Founded: 1947
- Headquarters: Osaka and Tokyo, Japan
- Key people: Keita Kato (CEO, President)
- Number of employees: 27,000
- Website: https://www.Sekisuichemical.com

Sekisui Chemical is a Plastics manufacturer with head offices in Osaka and Tokyo. The company owns a plethora of subsidiaries engaged in a variety of businesses. Sekisui has over 27,000 employees in more than eighteen countries worldwide.

== History ==
Sekisui Chemical was founded on March 3, 1947. In October 2020, a 45-year old researcher was accused of engaging in corporate espionage against Sekisui on behalf of Guangdong-based Chaozhou Three-Circle.

Sekisui has been recognized for its environmental efforts and in 2020 was ranked as the 12th most sustainable corporation in the world by the Canadian organization Corporate Knights Inc.
