= Robin Zasio =

American clinical psychologist

- Education: Southern Oregon University (BA); California State University, Sacramento (MSW); California School of Professional Psychology (PsyD)

Robin Diane Zasio is an American clinical psychologist and licensed clinical social worker specializing in obsessive–compulsive disorder (OCD), anxiety disorders, and hoarding disorder. She is known for her role as a psychologist on the A&E series Hoarders and clinical practice and publications on compulsive hoarding and related conditions.

== Early life and education ==
Zasio earned a Bachelor of Arts in psychology from Southern Oregon University. She subsequently obtained a Master of Social Work from California State University, Sacramento in 1989. While pursuing her master's degree, she secured a position working in forensics for the state of California, focusing on individuals who had committed crimes and were mentally ill. After completing her master's, she enrolled in the California School of Professional Psychology and completed a Doctor of Psychology in clinical psychology.

== Career ==
While earning her doctorate, Zasio initially intended to work in forensics, but shifted her focus in 1999 when she co-founded one of Northern California's first anxiety treatment centers in Sacramento to accrue clinical hours for licensure. This led her to instead specialize in anxiety disorders and obsessive–compulsive disorder (OCD), using cognitive behavioral therapy (CBT) and exposure and response prevention (ERP). In 2005, she opened The Anxiety Treatment Center in Sacramento, which later grew to include The Cognitive Behavior Therapy Center and The Compulsive Hoarding Center. She continues to maintain a private practice and supervises interns in the treatment of anxiety and related conditions.

Zasio held the position of president of the Sacramento Valley Psychological Association from 2003 to 2005 and remains a board member at large. She is affiliated with the International Obsessive Compulsive Disorder Foundation (IOCDF), serving on its Scientific Advisory Board, Clinical Advisory Board, and Speakers Bureau. In 2010, she established the OCD Sacramento Foundation, an IOCDF affiliate. She hosted the First Annual 1 Million Steps for OCD Walk in Sacramento in 2014. Zasio also serves on the Advisory Board for the Sacramento Chapter of the National Alliance on Mental Illness (NAMI), contributing a "Doctor's Column" to their newsletter. Her professional memberships include the International Obsessive Compulsive Disorder Foundation, American Psychological Association, and Association for Behavioral and Cognitive Therapies.

In 2014, Zasio provided testimony in a murder trial concerning a man accused of shooting an animal control officer. She suggested that the man's hoarding disorder, coupled with the extreme distress he reportedly experienced regarding the potential loss of his animals, could have contributed to an aggressive reaction.

=== Popular media ===
Since 2009, Zasio has been a recurring psychologist on the television series Hoarders, appearing on-camera to assess and support individuals with severe compulsive hoarding behaviors during cleanup efforts.

Zasio also appeared as a psychologist on My Extreme Animal Phobia on Animal Planet in 2011. In 2012, she served as a national spokesperson for Hotmail to address email hoarding. She has also made appearances on other television and radio such as The Today Show, Anderson Live, Fox News, Good Day Sacramento, The Katie Couric Show, Rosie Radio, NPR, Dateline NBC, and HLN.

In 2011, she authored The Hoarder in You: How to Live a Happier, Healthier, Uncluttered Life.
