= Chemung Canal Bank Building =

Historic commercial building in New York, United States

- U.S. National Register of Historic Places
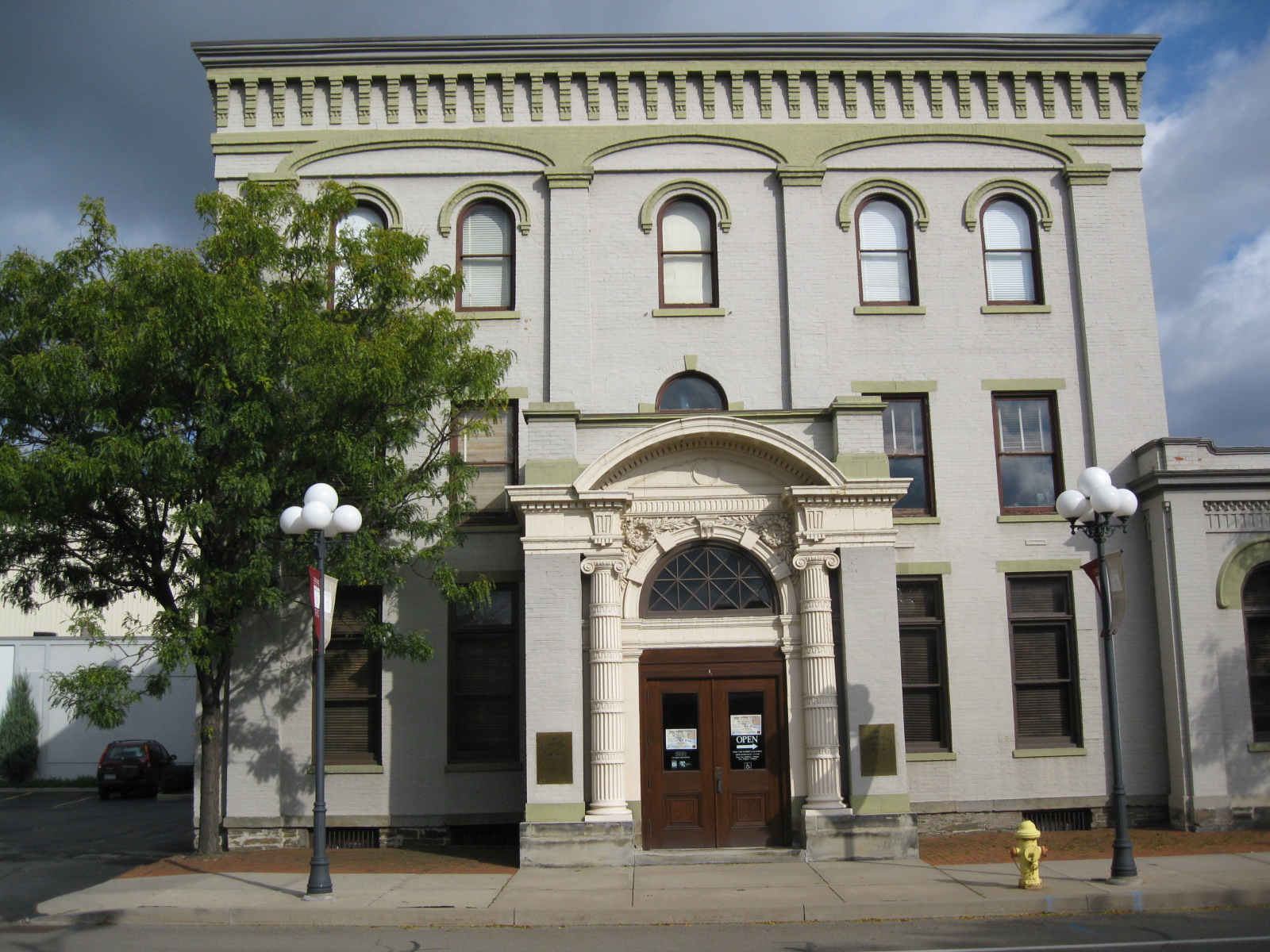
- Chemung Canal Bank Building, October 2009

- Location within New York Location within the United States
- Location: 415 E. Water St., Elmira, New York
- Coordinates: 42°5′18″N 76°48′1″W
- Area: less than one acre
- Built: 1833
- NRHP reference No.: 78001844
- Added to NRHP: June 23, 1978

The Chemung Canal Bank Building is located at 415 East Water Street in Elmira, Chemung County, New York, United States. It is thought to be the oldest commercial building in Elmira. The Chemung Canal opened in 1832 and construction on the bank building began the same year. In 1833 the bank moved into the new building and the Chemung Canal Trust Company was chartered to deposit cash and supply capitol and credit. The building continued to house the bank for seventy-six years. For the following fifty-six years it was home to various local law offices. From 1976 forward, it has been owned by the Chemung County Historical Society. The building is significant for its period architecture and its place in the history of the area. It was named to the National Register of Historic Places in 1978.

== Uses ==
The Chemung Canal Bank Building was chartered in July 1833, and was open for business later that year, in October. It was owned and operated by the Chemung Canal Trust Company until 1920 when they moved to a new location. After the Chemung Canal Trust Company moved, the building came under the ownership of the Arnot Realty Company. The building was also home to various offices including the Sayles, Evans, Brayton, Palmer, and Tifft Law Firm. The building was purchased in the early 1980s and is currently run and owned by the Chemung County Historical Society. The first floor has become a general history museum (The Chemung Valley History Museum), the largest in the region. The second floor is occupied by the Booth library, a research facility/archive open to the public and the third floor is used for collections storage.

== Appearance and features ==
The building was a combination of Greek Revival and Traditional Federal styling. It was a brick structure with stepped gables, whereas most buildings of that time period were made of wood. The Bank building had a stone stoop with an ornamental wrought iron railing. The floor plan included a large central hall with one or two rooms on either side as well as a substantial staircase. The second floor was to be used as an apartment for the bank manager. The structure was built upon a stone basement, separate from the foundations of the vaults on the east and west sides. The west side vaults were used by the gas company offices on the west side of the building. In 1868 the bank was remodeled to include a third floor, to be used as rentable apartment space. In 1903 the building was renovated by the Pierce & Bickford architectural firm. The modifications included the addition of two more vaults to store books and currency, mahogany counters, terrazzo flooring, extra restrooms, coupon booths, and a ventilation system that included an indirect heating system and a fan for the summer months. In 1993 the Bank Building was renovated and restored by the Chemung County Historical Society, although many of the original features are still present.
