= Integrative milieu model =

Psychiatric treatment

The integrative milieu model, developed by Kevin F. McCready, is an alternative treatment regime to the medical model of psychiatry for treating people suffering from psychological distress.

A central part of the anti-psychiatry movement, being a close friend of Peter Breggin and a board member of the International Center for the Study of Psychiatry and Psychology, McCready based his model on the idea that human psychological suffering is not caused by a physiological disease or a chemical imbalance, but by a compromise to a person's humanity. He believed that the biomedical model of psychiatry was a compromise to a person's humanity, stripping its patients from elements he considers to be a necessary and natural part of human life experience. This model of treatment combined elements from psychodynamic theories, particularly the theories of Carl G. Jung, humanism, and existentialism.

The integrative milieu model's approach is one which attempts to create a new community for its participants to interact within. This community is based on four main ideas:

- The milieu must be a therapeutic container which allows an intensive exploration of the personal and collective psyche. It must therefore have a structure which maintains continuity and a sense of security.
- The professionals who work to maintain the structure of the container must be flexible to allow for the expected and the unexpected expression of self which comes in such an environment.
- The integration of all aspects of the human experience must be not only allowed to be expressed and explored, but must be encouraged to be expressed and explored. This means that all aspects of humanity must be made part of the integrative milieu, including such things as play, art, music, discussion, and intimacy.
- A respect for the human being's sense of self-direction. All patients within the milieu are expected to behave in a responsible, respectful manner. McCready believed that the expectations which are part of a community's fundamental philosophy play a significant role in the corresponding behavior of those who are part of the community.

== Integrative milieu day treatment ==
McCready developed a day treatment program based on the integrative milieu model. It is a continuous program, with open enrollment. Most group therapy situations have a beginning phase, during which all clients who are participating in the group begin and an ending phase, until which all group members are encouraged to maintain regular attendance; and all group members complete their treatment at that time. However, in a continuous program, new group members may join the group at any time and group members complete their treatment and terminate therapy at any time they are ready, which means there is a staggered enrollment. The schedule of the program was intentionally set up in such a manner that one started the day light, gradually went deeper, and finally returned to a lighter level before the end of the day. The groups were set up to run for fifty minutes each. All groups would have one therapist moderating. The groups would include not only traditional psychodynamically-oriented psychotherapy groups, but also groups designed for artistic expression, recreation, discussion of dreams, discussion of specific topics selected by the group, and general community goal and feedback groups.

All clients enrolled in the integrative milieu also receive individual psychotherapy from one of the staff psychotherapists. This therapy is psychodynamic in orientation, but adheres to the principles of the integrative milieu model.

Programs currently in existence include:

- Associated Psychological Health Services
- Sequioa Psychotherapy Center and
- the Insight Center.
- Spectrum (Victoria, Australia) is a further example of an integrative milieu model and has been treating people with borderline personality disorder using this approach since 1999.
