= Chaozhou Three-Circle =

Chinese materials company

Chaozhou Three-Circle Group Co., Ltd.
- Trade name: CCTC
- Native name: 潮州三环（集团）股份有限公司
- Type: Public
- Traded as: SZSE: 300408; CSI A50; SEHK: 6951
- Industry: Electronic components Advanced materials
- Founded: 1970; 56 years ago
- Founder: Zhang Wanzhen
- Headquarters: Chaozhou, Guangdong, China
- Key people: Li Gang (Chairman); Ma Yanhong (President)
- Revenue: ▲CN¥5.73 billion (2023)
- Net income: ▲CN¥1.58 billion (2023)
- Total assets: ▲CN¥21.83 billion (2023)
- Total equity: ▲CN¥18.24 billion (2023)
- Number of employees: 13,514 (2023)
- Website: www.cctc.cc

Chaozhou Three-Circle (CCTC; Chinese: 潮州三环; pinyin: Cháozhōu Sānhuán) is a publicly listed Chinese electronic components and advanced materials company headquartered in Chaozhou, Guangdong.

In 2025, Frost & Sullivan ranked CCTC as the world’s seventh-largest supplier of electronic ceramic materials and components.

== Background ==
CCTC was founded in 1970 as a state-owned enterprise. It originally was established to manufacture ceramic substrates and resistors.

In 1984, CCTC started using overseas equipment to automate the manufacturing production. By the end of the 1990s, it had become the world's largest manufacturer of ceramic substrates and resistors.

In 1992, CCTC was restructured as a private Joint-stock company. Zhang Wanzhen who had worked for the company since the age of 16 after junior high school was the chairman of the newly restructured company.

In 1996, CCTC stated investing in the production of Alumina substrates for resistors of integrated circuits.

In 2001, CCTC through research and development created new products for integrated circuits components. With the development of the Internet, CCTC also started producing ceramic components for optical communications.

In 2004, CCTC entered the new energy market and started developing materials for Solid oxide fuel cells.

In 2005, CCTC started developing its own specialized equipment to get around the restriction of overseas equipment.

In 2008, CCTC entered the integrated circuit packaging market and started manufacturing materials for it.

On 3 December 2014 CCTC held its initial public offering becoming a listed company on the Shenzhen Stock Exchange. The offering raised US$216 million.

On 12 October 2020, General secretary Xi Jinping came to inspect CCTC during his tour of Guangdong.

For China's top 10 chip subsidy recipients in 2022, CCTC came ninth receiving 213 million yuan in subsidies.

In July 2026, CCTC held a secondary listing on the Hong Kong Stock Exchange.

== Products ==
CCTC's mainly produces electronic ceramic products. These include Mobile phone accessories, Wearable technology exteriors and ceramic materials used in the integrated circuit field.

CCTC has manufactured phone rear covers that are said to have high durability. It is the core supplier of Xiaomi and also supplied Huawei, Oppo, Vivo and OnePlus.

Oher clients of CCTC include Bloom Energy, Amphenol and Vishay Intertechnology.

== Alleged industrial espionage ==
In October 2020, a 45-year-old researcher was accused by authorities of engaging in industrial espionage against Sekisui Chemical on behalf of CCTC. He divulged information on the production of conductive particles used in touchscreens between August 2018 and January 2019. CCTC allegedly approached the man in 2018 through a message on LinkedIn and invited him to visit China with the expenses paid for. During one of the trips, CCTC proposed exchanging its technology for Sekisui Chemical's. The researcher was accused of copying company information to his personal flash drive and emailing the data to CCTC on his own computer. He was dismissed in May 2019 following an internal investigation. Authorities stated his motives were to obtain technology from CCTC for Sekisui Chemical that would boost his standing within the company. CCTC made no comment on the case.
