= Maternal wall =

The maternal wall is a term referring to stereotypes and various forms of discrimination encountered by working mothers and mothers seeking employment. Women hit the maternal wall when they encounter workplace discrimination because of past, present, or future pregnancies or because they have taken one or more maternity leaves. Women may also be discriminated against when they opt for part-time or flexible work schedules. Maternal wall discrimination is not limited to childcare responsibilities. Both men and women with caregiving responsibilities, such as taking care of a sick parents or spouse, may also result in maternal wall discrimination. As such, maternal wall discrimination is also described as family responsibilities discrimination. Research suggests that the maternal wall is cemented by employer stereotypes and gender expectations.

== History ==
The first major maternal wall case, Phillips v. Martin Marietta Corp., appeared before the United States Supreme Court in 1971. Since then, the number of Family Responsibilities Discrimination lawsuits increased steadily, with a steep jump in the 1990s. This coincided with the growing wage disparity between mothers and non-mothers. To explain this phenomenon, the term "maternal wall" emerged from academe in the 1990s.

== Causes ==
=== Psychological theories ===
==== Expectation states theory ====
Expectation states theory says that categorical distinctions made between individuals become status characteristics when common cultural stereotypes attach greater status and competence with one category versus another. According to expectation states theory, women will be categorized as mothers when they give some behavioral indicator that they are a primary caretaker, such as becoming pregnant. Additionally, since motherhood characteristics overlap with stereotypes about women, the indicator may be something as simple as their gender. A woman's status as a mother will be in conflict with the image of an ideal worker (dedication to her children vs. committed to the job) and so motherhood will be judged as a status characteristic that is relevant to the worker's job performance. A worker's role as a mother will strongly bias expectations for their competence compared to nonmothers.

==== Role congruity theory ====
Eagly and Karau (2002) proposed that prejudice can arise when the perception of members of a social group do not meet the requirements of that social group. Role incongruity, the degree to which stereotypes do not match one's perception, can result in discrimination. With respect to the workplace, employees are expected to take the role of the "ideal worker", an employee who is available and dedicated to their job 24/7. Mothers and individuals with caregiving responsibilities do not fit the "ideal worker" schema.

==== Stereotype content model ====
The stereotype content model (SCM) is a psychological theory that differentiates stereotypes among two dimensions: warmth and competence. Stereotyped groups can be evaluated in four combinations of warmth by competence in terms of being low or high on either trait. The combination of these dimensions will elicit different types of emotions from others. According to the SCM, mothers are stereotyped as high in warmth, but low in competence. Groups who are viewed as high in warmth, but low in competence elicit feelings of pity and a paternalistic response which may result in discrimination.

=== Economic theories ===
Economic theories suggest that occupational and lifestyle choices explain the motherhood penalty. The maternal wall is regarded as a self-imposed barrier, where women expecting motherhood self-select into occupations that require lower levels of skill and education because they anticipate less participation in the labor force over their lifetime. Furthermore, women who choose "home-time" and choose to take leave from the workforce are statistically less likely to achieve higher-earning professional and managerial positions. The argument follows that women are not fully committed to the labor force, thus explaining wage differentials. Similarly, this lack of commitment may explain the motherhood penalty in terms of performance. Economist Gary Becker follows a "work-effort" hypothesis, which suggests that employed mothers do not perform as well as men because of their choices, such as refusing to "work odd hours or take jobs requiring much travel". Alternatively, employers may use statistical discrimination, in which employers use average estimates of productivity to predict the productivity of certain groups. As such, mothers may receive lower wages due to lower estimates of productivity. Other economic perspectives include the taste model, in which employers may find it distasteful to employ mothers.

The motherhood penalty also posits that since childcare and household tasks are not paid labor, women's earning potential is limited This is especially true of single mothers and women who rely on child support payments from absent partners. This reliance means that earning potential is beyond the control of the mother. The combination of low skill jobs, part-time work for flexible hours and lower participation rates in the workforce makes mothers vulnerable to higher poverty rates. Social welfare programs have successfully been implemented in several countries, including Sweden, France, Germany and the Netherlands. These programs help to ease the negative impact of the motherhood penalty.

== Relationship with other concepts ==
=== Mommy track and motherhood penalty ===
The "mommy track" can be the result of maternal wall discrimination. For example, when employees are fired or demoted for taking maternity leave, they are being essentially forced onto the mommy track. The mommy track, motherhood penalty, and the maternal wall have similar discriminatory effects; however, the maternal wall is also applicable to individuals who are discriminated against due to caregiving responsibilities.

=== Work–life balance ===
Work–life balance describes the prioritization of work and life responsibilities. The maternal wall can manifest itself when work–life balance results in conflict. For example, increasing family responsibilities can limit employment opportunities. There is a disproportionate effect for lower-paid workers with care-taking responsibilities, as they have much less control and flexibility over their schedules compared to white-collared workers. For people with care-taking responsibilities, work–life balance is difficult to achieve, resulting in an increased likelihood of encountering the maternal wall.

== Effects ==
=== Wage penalty for motherhood ===
The wage penalty for motherhood refers to the negative effect of children on wages. Research focusing on the wage gap between mothers and non-mothers in the workplace found a 4% penalty for one child and a 12% penalty for two or more children, even after controlling for differences in education, work experience, and full-time versus part-time job status. By 1991, the wage gap between mothers and non-mothers surpassed the wage gap between women and men. Furthermore, there is a substantial difference between the wages of mother and fathers: At the age of 30, women earn 90 percent of the wages of men, whereas mothers earn approximately 60 percent of the wages of fathers. In terms of marital status, the motherhood penalty is greatest for single mothers compared to married mothers. Research suggests that one third of the motherhood penalty is explained by job experience and seniority, while the remaining two thirds suggest that productivity and discrimination explain the motherhood penalty. Over time, the motherhood penalty may have serious financial consequences. Research suggests that mothers are 35% more likely to lose their homes than childless homeowners, and that mothers are 65% more likely to go bankrupt than nonmothers.

Research has found that mothers who use work-family policy programs can experience slower wage growth compared to those who don't. In a 2004 longitudinal study that analyzed employed mothers' wage growth for 7 years post-childbirth, it was found that women who used work-family policies such as reduced working hours, remote work, childcare assistance, and flextime had slower wage growth compared to those who didn't. Mothers employed in managerial or professional positions and worked reduced hours or via remote work experienced the slowest wage growth. Compared to professional/managerial employed mothers who didn't work at home, professional/managerial mothers who worked from home averaged a 27% lower gain in wages.

=== Empirical findings ===
==== Negative competence assumptions ====
In a laboratory study conducted by Correll, Bernard, and Paik (2007), participants were given the resumes of a parent and non-parent with equivalent qualifications and asked to complete an employee evaluation. Results indicated that mothers were rated as significantly less competent, less committed, less promotable and less likely to be recommended for management than non-mothers. Furthermore, the suggested starting salaries for mothers were $11,000 (7.6%) less than for non-mothers, and only 48% of mothers were recommended for hire, compared to 87% of non-mothers. In addition, the standards for mothers were much stricter; they were given significantly less time for being late, and needed a significantly higher score on the management exam in order to even be considered for hire compared to non-mothers.

Compared to women without children, working mothers receive lower ratings in competence, but increased ratings in warmth. However, increased ratings in warmth do not predict greater job opportunities. In an observational study, participants were less willing to hire, promote, or train working mothers compared to other groups such as childless women and men, and working fathers. Additionally, for academics, superiors rated working mothers as less likely to advance in their careers compared to working fathers.

==== Pregnancy ====
Other studies have investigated the effects of pregnancy in the workplace. In a laboratory study by Halpert, Wilson, and Hickman (1993), participants viewed one of two videotapes of a female manager and were then asked to rate her performance. The videotape featured the same woman and the same managerial scenarios; however, in one videotape, the woman was pregnant. Performance reviews of the pregnant manager were significantly lower than the non-pregnant manager, indicating a strong pregnancy bias. Another study examined the effect of pregnancy on employment, and found that pregnant women encountered more hostility when applying to traditionally masculine jobs.

== Legal Implications ==
=== Legislation ===
The majority of maternal wall lawsuits are filed under Title VII of the Civil Rights Act of 1964, which prohibits sex discrimination in employment. Title VII did not have a clause about pregnancy until it was amended in 1978 to include the Pregnancy Discrimination Act. The act states that "an employer may not discriminate against and employee on the basis of pregnancy, childbirth, or related medical conditions; and women affected by pregnancy, childbirth, or related medical conditions must be treated the same as other persons not so affected but similar in their ability or inability to work." Due to limitations in the original clause, the Equal Employment Opportunity Commission (EEOC) created clarifying guidelines in 2014 called the Enforcement Guidance on Pregnancy Discrimination and Related Guidelines. This outlines the coverage, access to benefits, disparate treatment, disparate impact, disability status and best practices. This legislation ensures that pregnant workers are compensated at the same rate as they were prior to becoming pregnant, which helps to avoid wage penalties.

=== Court cases ===
Successful maternal wall cases must demonstrate that employees are discriminated not because of their sex, but because of their sex role. As such, men can also be discriminated against when they occupy a caregiving and traditionally female sex role. The majority of maternal wall lawsuits are filed under Title VII, which prohibits sex discrimination in employment. Maternal wall cases also fall under the umbrella of Family Responsibilities Discrimination, which is employment discrimination against workers who have caregiving responsibilities, such as pregnant women, mothers and fathers of young children and employees with aging parents. Family Responsibility Discrimination cases have risen dramatically since the 1970s: In the 1970s, only 8 cases were filed, whereas 358 cases were filed between 2000 and 2005. Investigations of these lawsuits show that most involve overt discrimination, and that 92% of the plaintiffs are women. The win rate of Family Responsibilities Discrimination lawsuits is more than 50%, whereas traditional discrimination lawsuits have a win rate of roughly 20%.

== Possible organizational solutions ==
- Offering more flexible scheduling accommodations. Organizations could incorporate more flexible scheduling to accommodate workers with caregiving responsibilities. Many of the Family Responsibility Discrimination lawsuits were due to indirect discrimination. For example, companies with policies and norms expecting their employees to work long hours, go on last-minute travel or move frequently essentially build the maternal wall; these requirements can not be met by employees with caregiving responsibilities. By incorporating flexible scheduling into company policies, employees would be less likely to encounter maternal wall discrimination.
- Encouraging men to use family-friendly policies. Even though organizations do provide family-friendly policies, women are more likely to use them than men. However, working mothers may be reluctant to participate in them since using them may harm or stall their careers. One way to avoid a backlash against female workers would be for organizations to encourage male participation in family-friendly policies. Fathers who take advantage of parental leave show increased participation in childcare tasks and household responsibilities.
- Giving women with families more time to show their competence. Organizations should allow working mothers to have more time to demonstrate their skills and ability to succeed in the organization. Access to work-family policies may assist with this.

== See also ==
- Mommy track
- Motherhood penalty
