= Bible church =

Christian Organisation

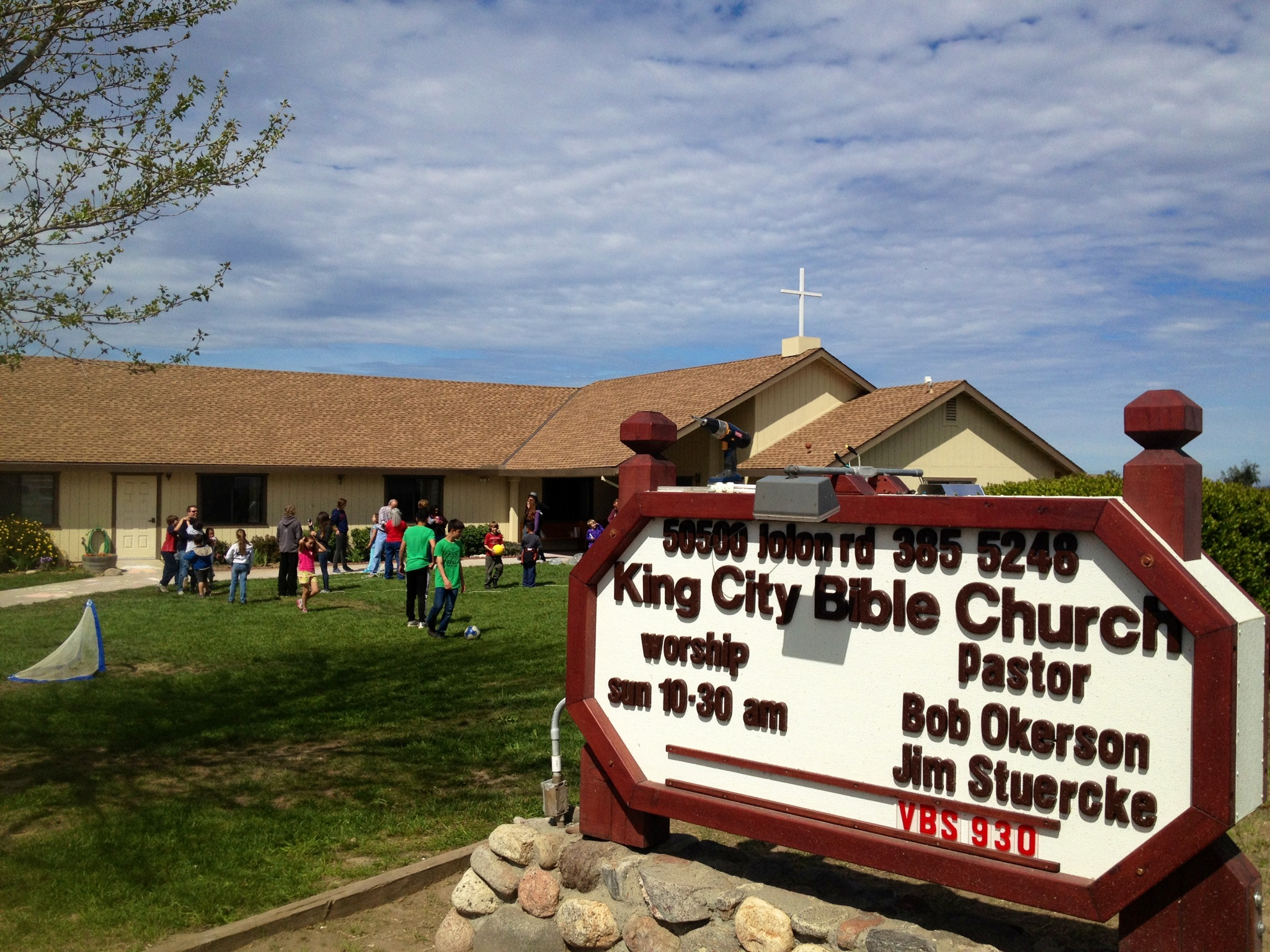
A Bible church building in California.

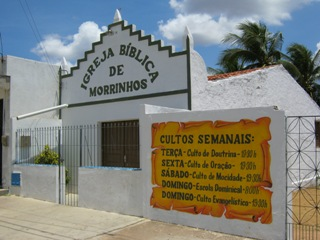
A Bible church building in Morrinhos, Brazil.

Bible church is a type of Christian organisation which emphasizes the Bible as its behavioral standard, and focuses on the inerrancy of the Bible. It is typically a type of Evangelical Protestant church. Bible churches can be non-denominational or affiliated with a denomination, such as the Bible Methodist Connection of Churches, Bible Missionary Church or International Fellowship of Bible Churches. This dictates whether a particular Bible church would be committed to a certain catechism, creed, and Christian theology. The International Fellowship of Bible churches, for example, adheres to Wesleyan-Arminian theology. Nevertheless, many Bible churches hold to a few commonalities.

In general, Bible churches are committed to expository preaching, often by teaching verse-by-verse through an entire book of the Bible. This practice, fueled by the belief that the Bible is inerrant, inspired by God, and sufficient (born from the Protestant teachings of sola scriptura or prima scriptura), is central to the essence of most Bible churches, and is the origin of their name.

Bible churches almost universally hold to the doctrine of sola fide or justification by faith, a teaching born out of the Reformation.

In addition, many, though not all, Bible churches are premillennial dispensationalists, as the Bible church movement has largely been attributed to the Dallas Theological Seminary, which is a leading dispensationalist institution.
