= California School of Management and Leadership =

Business school of Alliant International University

Coordinates: 32.897°N 117.094°W

California School of Management and Leadership is the business school of Alliant International University in San Diego, California. It is accredited by the WASC and the Accrediting Commission for Senior Colleges and Universities. It is named after Marshall Goldsmith.
