= Rational Recovery =

Defunct commercial vendor

Rational Recovery (RR) was a commercial vendor of material related to counseling, guidance, and direct instruction for addiction designed as a direct counterpoint to Alcoholics Anonymous (AA) and twelve-step programs.

Rational Recovery was founded in 1986 by Jack Trimpey, a California-licensed clinical social worker. Trimpey is a recovered alcoholic who works in the field of treatment of alcoholism and other drug addictions. Rational Recovery is a commercial trademark, along with the Addictive Voice Recognition Technique (AVRT). The organization published a periodical, the Journal of Rational Recovery, from at latest 1993 until at least June 2001. The former "Rational Recovery" website ("rational.org") and a newer website www.avrt.com are now both 'parked' domains.

== Program ==
The program (AVRT) is not a form of therapy, counseling, or addiction treatment. Some assistance is free, but the program requires some "very modest charges" for goods and services including books, articles, and audio CDs to assist in the recovery process. Much of the material is offered for free via the Internet, and an interested person can begin the Rational Recovery program through the Internet. The Rational Recovery program is based on the premise that the addict both desires and is capable of permanent, planned abstinence. However, the Rational Recovery program recognizes that, paradoxically, the addict also wants to continue using. This is because of their belief in the power of the substance to quell their anxiety; an anxiety which is itself partially substance-induced, as well as greatly enhanced, by the substance. This ambivalence is the Rational Recovery definition of addiction.

According to this paradigm, the primary force driving an addict's predicament is what Trimpey calls the "addictive voice", which can physiologically be understood as being related to the parts of the human brain that control our core survival functions such as hunger, sex, and bowel control. Consequently, when the desires of this "voice" are not satiated, the addict experiences anxiety, depression, restlessness, irritability, and anhedonia (inability to feel pleasure). In essence, the RR method is to first make a commitment to planned, permanent abstinence from the undesirable substance or behavior, and then equip oneself with the mental tools to stick to that commitment. Most important to recovering addicts is the recognition of this addictive voice, and determination to remain abstinent by constantly reminding themselves of the rational basis of their decision to quit. As time progresses, the recovering addict begins to see the benefits of separating themselves and their rational minds from a bodily impulse that has no regard for responsibility, success, delayed gratification, or moral obligation.

While nomenclature differs, the methods are similar to those used in Cognitive Therapy of Substance Disorders (Beck, et al.) and other belief-, attitude- and appraisal-challenging and cognitive restructuring schemes.

The RR program is based on recognizing and defeating what the program refers to as the "addictive voice" (internal thoughts that support self-intoxication) and dissociation from addictive impulses. The specific technique of Addictive Voice Recognition Technique (AVRT) refers to the practice of objectively recognizing any mental thoughts that support or suggest substance use as AV (addictive voice). This passive recognition allows the practitioner to realize that they don't need to do what the AV says, but can effortlessly abstain. This technique relies heavily on basic semantics, essentially relegating the AV to an objectively recognizable "it" and retaining the control and free will of the "I." Rather than saying to oneself, "I drink", one can use AVRT to understand that "I don't want to drink, it (the AV) wants to drink." Once this "separation" is achieved, and the practitioner has personally experienced that they indeed can observe objectively their own addictive voice, maintaining abstinence is a matter of self-control and becomes a personal choice of free will.

In his book, Rational Recovery, Trimpey calls the addict's addictive voice "the bark of Beast", "the Beast" being the desire for intoxication. He proposes that this is the sole reason why addicts continue their self-destructive ways. Furthermore, by recognizing any feeling, image, urge, etc. that supports drinking/using as "Beast activity", the compulsions will fall silent, and the person can eventually regain control over their life and never worry about relapses. Rather than making addiction a lifelong battle, it is much easier to say "no" to the addictive voice, than to give in. Moreover, this separation of the rational self from the relentless "Beast" will, Trimpey says, enable addicts to always remain aware of the repercussions associated with a single relapse.

The notions that internal thoughts support self-intoxication and that the practitioner is in control of the addictive voice have become foundational in "evidence-based" treatment schemes at more progressive substance abuse treatment facilities in the US, Canada, Australia and the UK. These facilities base their programs on the success of rational emotive behavior therapy, cognitive behavioral therapy, cognitive appraisal therapy, and schema therapy for anxiety and depression, as well as for substance abuse.

== Comparison with Alcoholics Anonymous ==
While Rational Recovery and AA promote abstinence, the programs use radically different strategies. Rational Recovery repeatedly claims that there is no better time to construct a "big plan" to abstain from drinking/using than now, and that AA's idea of "one day at a time" is contradictory to never using again. That is, Rational Recovery says, if AA proposes that you are never going to drink again, then there isn't a reason to keep track of time.

- Rational Recovery does not regard alcoholism as a disease, but rather a voluntary behavior.
- Rational Recovery discourages adoption of the forever "recovering" drunk persona. (AA textbook "Alcoholics Anonymous" 4th ed. page xiii, line 4: "to show precisely how we have recovered").
- There are no Rational Recovery recovery groups (although meetings were held throughout the country during the 1990s).
- Great emphasis is placed on self-efficacy (cf. Albert Bandura).
- There are no discrete steps and no consideration of religious matters, or requirement to put one's trust in any sort of higher power, whether it be a god or a group of people.

== Court-mandated twelve-step program attendance ==
In the United States, psychologist and lawyer Stanton Peele has encouraged legal action against mandated attendance of 12-step programs, stating an objection to the courts and other government and tax-supported agencies mandating attendance at meetings run by organizations with spiritual or religious content. They interpret state-mandated 12-step program attendance as a violation of the Establishment Clause within the First Amendment. This view has been upheld in Griffin v. Coughlin, Grandberg v. Ashland County, Warner v. Orange County Department of Probation, Kerr v. Lind, and O'Connor v. State of California. In his book, Peele notes the five most popular secular alternatives to AA at the time of publication, namely Rational Recovery, SMART Recovery, Women for Sobriety, Secular Organizations for Sobriety, and Moderation Management.

== Religious neutrality ==
Trimpey asserts that some have accused Rational Recovery of being anti-religious. The Rational Recovery FAQ states:

Rational Recovery has voiced the conscientious objections of tens of thousands of persons who have received unwanted, unconstitutional, religious indoctrinations in the course of addiction treatment. To them and others, we provide a program that is free from religion. By advocating for their religious freedom, and identifying the 12-step program as a religion that competes with established religions, we have been accused by some of being irreligious, sacrilegious, or even anti-religious. Ain't so.

Rational Recovery claims to remain neutral on the subject of religion and sobriety. Rational Recovery founder Jack Trimpey explains, "...Rational Recovery is not interested in having people give up any of their religious beliefs; it's just none of our business what people believe about gods and saints. The only exception here, of course, is when one is 'depending' on a rescuing deity in order to remain sober. If that is one's preference, then AA is an ideal program."

== Meetings canceled ==
Rational Recovery claims that "AVRT has made recovery groups obsolete." In late 1998, Rational Recovery announced, "The Recovery Group Movement is Over! . . . Beginning January 1, 1999, all addiction recovery group meetings. . . in the United States and Canada are canceled and will not be rescheduled." Despite those remarks, there are still some groups in existence today, although the numbers are dwindling.

In a 1993 research study led by Marc Galanter, former president of both the American Society of Addiction Medicine and the American Academy of Addiction Psychiatry, attempted to measure the impact of Rational Recovery on members. The research found that "Rational Recovery succeeded in engaging substance abusers and promoting abstinence among many of them while presenting a cognitive orientation that is different from the spiritual one of AA. Its utility in substance abuse treatment warrants further assessment. The results of the impact on this type of recovery are too few to make an educational assumption." This research was conducted before Rational Recovery disbanded their meetings in favor of self-recovery treatment. SMART Recovery split from Rational Recovery just after this research and continues to offer these same groups.

== See also ==
- Drug addiction recovery groups
