= Nicholas Cummings =

American psychologist and author (1924–2020)

- Born: July 25, 1924; Salinas, California, U.S.
- Died: June 8, 2020 (aged 95); Reno, Nevada, U.S.
- Education: University of California at Berkeley, Claremont Graduate University and Adelphi University
- Occupation: Psychologist
- Spouse: Dorothy Mills Cummings

Nicholas Andrew Cummings (July 25, 1924 – June 8, 2020) was an American psychologist and author.

== Education ==
Cummings first attended the University of California at Berkeley, receiving a bachelor's degree in psychology, before moving to Claremont Graduate University for his master's and Adelphi University for a doctorate in clinical psychology.

== Professional career ==
Cummings was Chief of Mental Health with the Kaiser Permanente Health Maintenance Organization (1959–1979) and founding president of the California School of Professional Psychology (1970). He became instrumental in the development of the Psy.D. training program for clinical psychologists when he launched the National Foundation of Professional Schools of Psychology, an alternative to the American Psychological Association for accrediting university doctoral programs in clinical psychology. In 1979, Cummings was elected president of the American Psychological Association. In 1994, he co-founded with his wife the Nicholas & Dorothy Cummings Foundation. The Foundation is dedicated to ensuring that routine healthcare includes doctoral psychotherapy. In the 2010s, they donated $5 million to the Archives of the History of American Psychology at the University of Akron (Ohio), which renamed itself the Cummings Center for the History of Psychology as a result. Cummings and his daughter Janet L. Cummings founded the Cummings Graduate Institute for Behavioral Health Studies in 2014.

== Select bibliography ==
- Cummings, Nicholas A.; William T O'Donohue; Janet Cummings (2 February 2009). Psychology's War on Religion. Zeig Tucker & Theisen. ISBN 978-1934442265.
- Cummings, Nicholas A.; William T. O'Donohue (24 April 2008). Eleven Blunders That Cripple Psychotherapy in America: a Remedial Unblundering. CRC Press. ISBN 978-0-415-98963-3.
- Cummings, Nicholas A.; William T O'Donohue; J. Lawrence Thomas (6 December 2002). Entrepreneur of Psychology: The Collected Papers of Nicholas A. Cummings. Zeig Tucker & Theisen Publishers. ISBN 978-1-891944-92-5.
- Cummings, Nicholas A.; Janet L. Cummings (3 March 2000). The Essence of Psychotherapy: Reinventing the Art in the New Era of Data. Elsevier. ISBN 978-0-12-198760-2.
- Cummings, Nicholas A. (September 2002). The Impact of Medical Cost Offset on Practice and Research: Making It Work for You. Context Press. ISBN 978-1-878978-41-7.
- Cummings, Nicholas A. (28 August 2001). Integrated Behavioral Healthcare: Positioning Mental Health Practice with Medical/Surgical Practice. Academic Press. ISBN 978-0-12-198761-9.
- Cummings, Nicholas A.; Mike K. Sayama (1 August 1995). Focused Psychotherapy: a Casebook of Brief, Intermittent Psychotherapy Throughout the Life Cycle. Psychology Press. ISBN 978-0-87630-789-2.
- Cummings, Nicholas A.; J. Lawrence Thomas; Janet L. Cummings (June 2000). The Value of Psychological Treatment: Collected Papers of Nicholas A. Cummings. Zeig Tucker & Theisen Publishers. ISBN 978-1-891944-12-3.
- O'Donohue, William T.; Nicholas A. Cummings (12 February 2008). Evidence-based Adjunctive Treatments. Academic Press. ISBN 978-0-12-088520-6.
- Wright, Rogers H.; Nicholas A. Cummings (2005). Destructive Trends in Mental Health: the Well-intentioned Path to Harm. Psychology Press. ISBN 978-0-415-95086-2.
- Wright, Rogers H.; Nicholas A. Cummings (September 2001). The Practice of Psychology: the Battle for Professionalism. Zeig Tucker & Theisen Publishers. ISBN 978-1-891944-73-4.

== Personal life ==
Cummings was born in Salinas, California. At the time of his death, Cummings resided in Reno, Nevada with his wife, Dorothy Mills Cummings. They have two children, three grandchildren, and three great-grandchildren.
