= James Framo =

American psychologist (1922–2001)

- Born: James Lawrence Framo; June 25, 1922; Philadelphia, Pennsylvania, U.S.
- Died: August 22, 2001 (aged 79); San Diego, California, U.S.
- Education: Pennsylvania State University (BA, MA); University of Texas (PhD)
- Occupations: Clinical psychologist Family therapist
- Employer(s): Eastern Pennsylvania Psychiatric Institute; Thomas Jefferson University Community Mental Health Center; Temple University; United States International University (later Alliant International University)
- Organizations: American Family Therapy Academy; American Association for Marriage and Family Therapy; American Psychological Association
- Known for: Family-of-origin therapy; Intergenerational family therapy; Family therapy
- Spouses: Mary Framo (divorced) Felise Levine (died)
- Children: 4
- Awards: American Family Therapy Academy Distinguished Achievement Award (1984)

James Framo (1922–2001) was an American psychologist and pioneer family therapist. He developed an object relations approach to intergenerational and family-of-origin therapy. He collaborated with other early family therapists and wrote or co-wrote several books on family therapy. The final chapter of his 1992 book Family-of-Origin Therapy: An Intergenerational Approach describes his early family experiences and their relationship to his therapeutic ideas.

== Early life and education ==
James Lawrence Framo was born on June 25, 1922 in South Philadelphia, Pennsylvania, into an Italian American family with five children. He worked as a dishwasher during high school to save money for college, and graduated from South Philadelphia High School in 1940. He enrolled at Pennsylvania State University (Penn State), but he left college after his freshman year to enlist in the U.S. Army during World War II. He served in an artillery unit during the Italian campaign, and spent approximately two years in combat. He was wounded before the end of the Italian campaign and returned to Penn State after the war.

Framo changed his major from English to psychology after his wartime experiences, and ultimately earned a B.A. in psychology from Penn State in 1947. He also earned an M.A. in psychology from Penn State in 1948, and later received a Ph.D. in clinical psychology from the University of Texas at Austin in 1953.

== Career ==
Framo began his career as a clinical psychologist. He interned at Worcester State Hospital and worked at a veterans hospital in Maryland, the Naval Hospital in Philadelphia, and a juvenile court. In the 1950s, Framo worked with early practitioners of family therapy and began treating psychological symptoms in the context of family relationships. During this period, Framo began treating entire families rather than individual patients alone.

Framo worked as a research scientist at the Eastern Pennsylvania Psychiatric Institute (EPPI) from 1957 to 1969. During this period he collaborated with Ivan Boszormenyi-Nagy on the development of family therapy techniques and models. He created an approach emphasizing transgenerational family relationships, and argued that problems in adult relationships often reflected unresolved issues with families of origin.

In 1969, Framo became chief of the Family Therapy Unit at Thomas Jefferson University Community Mental Health Center, where he directed what contemporary accounts described as the first family therapy hospital unit in the United States.

In 1973, Framo Joined Temple University as professor of psychology, and taught there until 1983. He moved to San Diego, California, in 1983 where he joined United States International University (later Alliant International University) as Distinguished Professor of Marriage and Family Therapy. He retired in 1999 and became professor emeritus.

Framo was a founding member of the American Family Therapy Association (AFTA), and served as its second president from 1981-1983. He received the AFTA Distinguished Achievement Award in 1984. He also was recognized by the American Association for Marriage and Family Therapy (AAMFT) as a founder in the field, and was an AAMFT Fellow and Approved Supervisor.

Framo was elected a Fellow of the American Psychological Association, and was a Diplomate of the American Board of Professional Psychology. He received recognition from APA Division 43 (Family Psychology) in 1997.

Framo served as an advisory editor for several family therapy journals, including Family Process, Journal of Sex and Marital Therapy, and Journal of Divorce and Remarriage, and presented more than 300 workshops and conference programs in the United States and internationally. He authored or coauthored more than 60 book chapters, books, and scholarly journal articles.

Framo’s primary therapeutic approach was the family-of-origin therapy model, which he developed. He also focused on transgenerational family relationships, and he encouraged parents and adult siblings to come into therapy sessions with adult clients. He emphasized resolving family-of-origin conflicts while family members were still living. Framo also combined object relations theory with family systems theory in his clinical work.

== Personal life and death ==
Framo’s married Mary Framo (nee D’Adamo) in 1946. Mary Framo was also a therapist, and together they had four children. The marriage ended in divorce in 1986. Later he married psychologist Felise Levine.

Framo died of a heart attack at his home in San Diego on August 22, 2001, at age 79.

== Honors and awards ==
- Distinguished Achievement in Family Therapy Award, American Family Therapy Academy, 1984.
- Distinguished Contribution to Family Psychology Award, American Psychological Association Division 43 (Family Psychology), 1997.
- Fellow, American Psychological Association.
- Fellow, American Association for Marriage and Family Therapy.
- Diplomate in Clinical Psychology, American Board of Professional Psychology.

== Selected publications ==
- Boszormenyi-Nagy, I. & Framo, J.L. (1965; 1985). Intensive family therapy: Theoretical and practical aspects. New York: Brunner/Mazel.
- Framo, J.L. (1968). "My families, my family". Voices: The Art and Science of Psychotherapy. 4: 18–27. ASIN B00073A5A0.
- Framo, J.L. (1970). Symptoms from a family transactional viewpoint. In N. W. Ackerman, J. Lieb, & J. K. Pearce (Eds.) Family therapy in transition. (pp. 125–171). Boston: Little & Brown.
- Framo, J.L (Ed.) (1972). Family interaction: A dialogue between family researchers and family therapists. New York: Springer.
- Green, R.J. & Framo, J.L. (Eds.)(1981). Family therapy: Major contributions. New York: International University Press.
- Framo, J.L. (1982). Explorations in marital and family therapy: Selected papers of James L Framo. New York: Springer.
- Framo, J.L. (1992). Family-of-origin therapy: An intergenerational approach. New York: Brunner/Mazel.
- Framo, J.L. (1996). "A Personal Retrospective of the Family Therapy Field: Then and Now". Journal of Marital and Family Therapy. 22 (3): 289–316. doi:10.1111/j.1752-0606.1996.tb00207.x.
- Framo, J.L., Weber, T. & Levine, F. (2003). Coming Home Again: A Family-of-origin Consultation. New York: Brunner/Routledge.
