= Chemung Canal Trust Company =

New York State chartered trust company based in Elmira

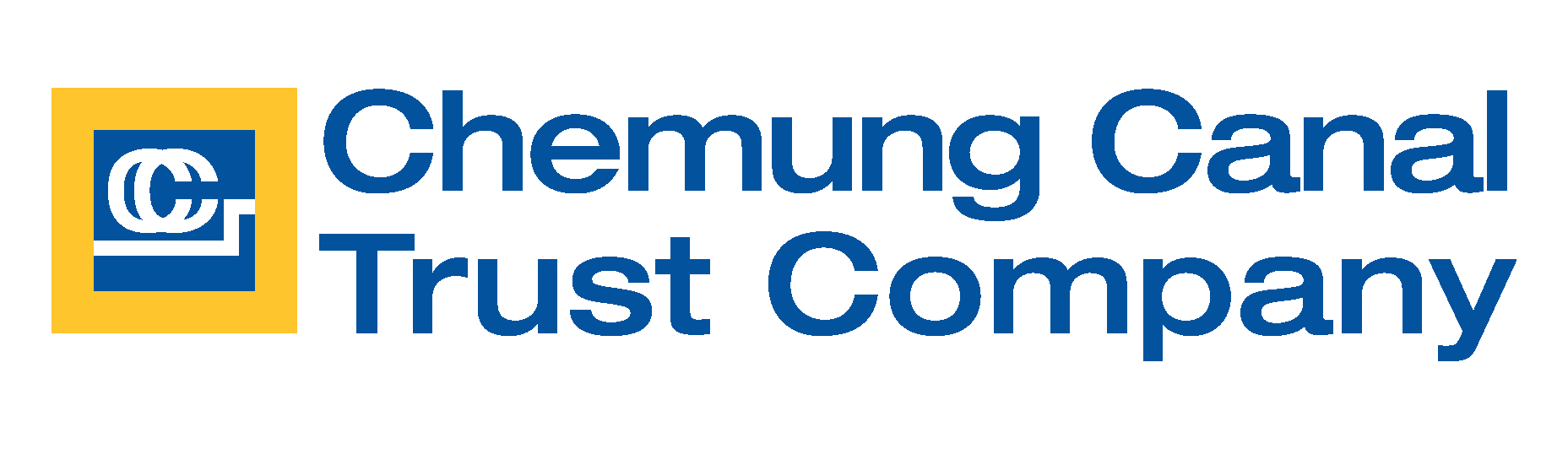

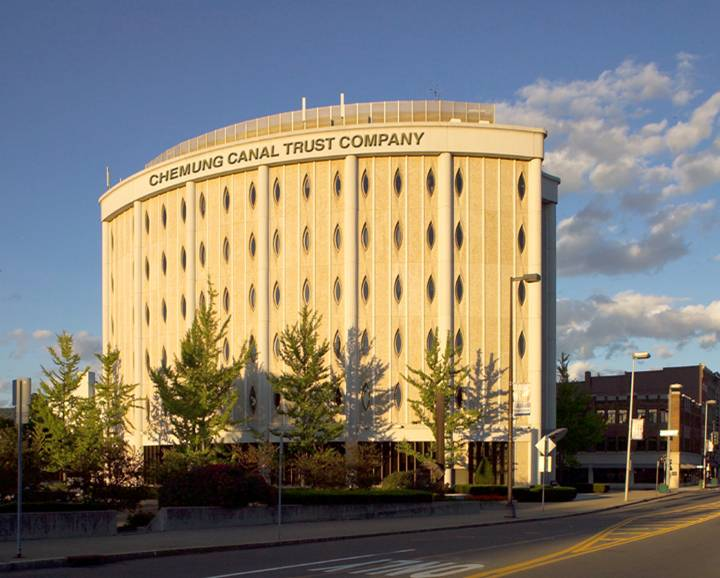
- Chemung Canal Trust Company's headquarters in Elmira, NY
- Type: Public
- Traded as: Nasdaq: CHMG
- Industry: Financial Services
- Founded: 1833
- Headquarters: Elmira, NY, Elmira, NY, United States
- Products: Checking, savings, loans, mortgages, lines of credit, commercial deposits, wealth management, retirement planning, trust and estate administration
- Total assets: $2.71 Billion (2025)
- Parent: Chemung Financial Corporation
- Website: https://chemungcanal.com

Chemung Canal Trust Company is a full-service community bank headquartered in Elmira, New York. It was founded as a publicly traded bank in 1833.

== History ==
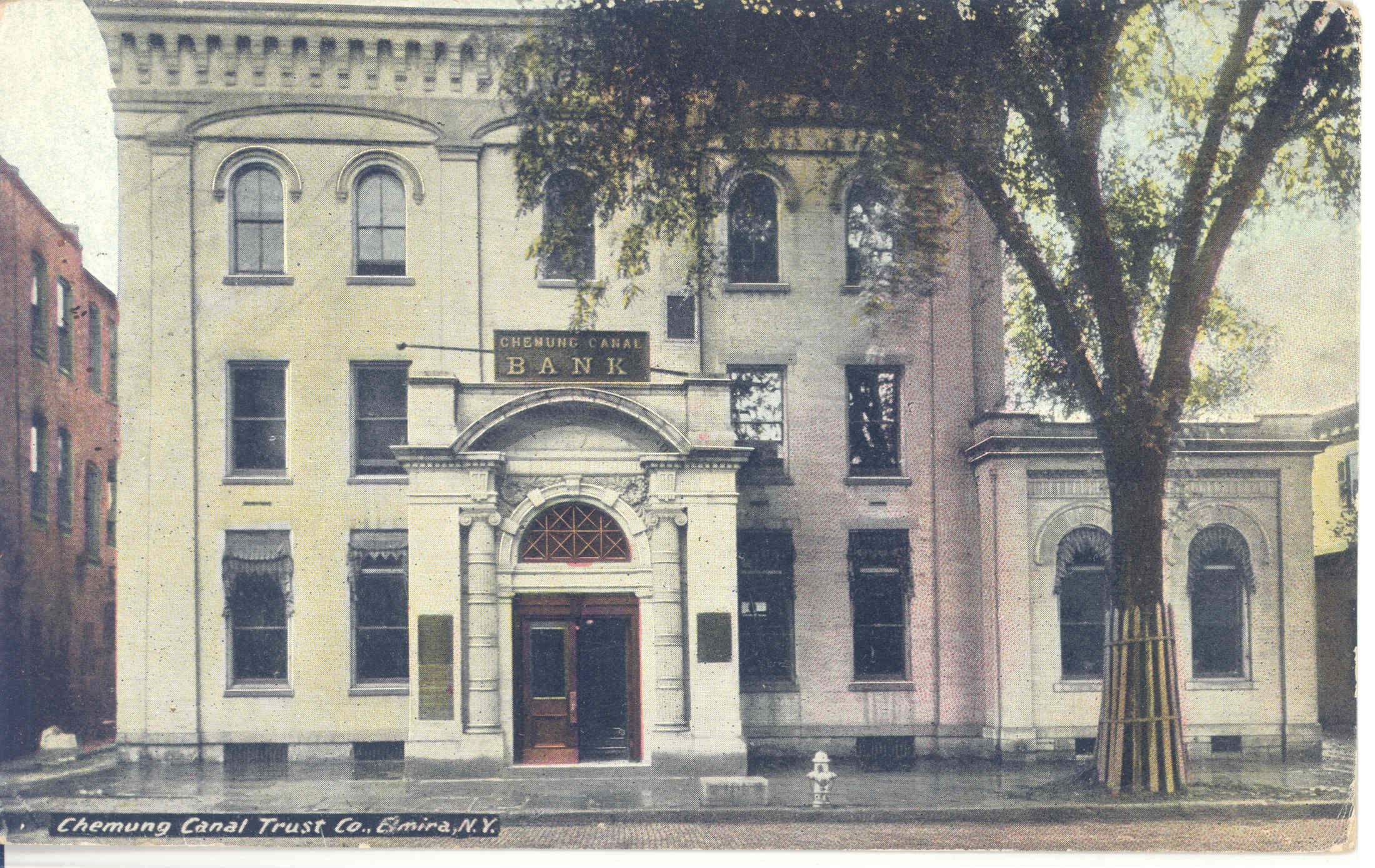
The bank was housed in the Chemung Canal Bank Building, pictured, until 1920.

The Chemung Canal waterway extended from the Chemung River at the intersection of today’s Water Street and Clemens Center Parkway in Elmira, New York to Seneca Lake. The canal opened a pathway for coal, lumber and agricultural products to reach the world through the New York State Canal system.

The opening of the canal caused an immediate need for a bank in Elmira to help manage the newfound prosperity and the credit needs of new and expanding businesses. The bank was represented in the New York State Senate by Hon. John G. McDowell. He took the lead in the passage of Chapter 132 of the Laws of 1833, Section 1, which provided: There shall be established in the Village of Elmira and County of Tioga, a bank, to be called The Chemung Canal Bank.”

The stock subscription book was opened on June 24, 1833 and closed two days later with astounding results. A total of 704 individuals subscribed for stock with the aggregate demand reaching $1,434,450. Because the Bank was capitalized at $200,000, however, only 4,000 shares of stock at $50.00 per share was allocated to 188 subscribers, with no more than 50 shares to one person. The Bank was originally housed in the Chemung Canal Bank Building, which is now home to the Chemung Valley History Museum.

McDowell became the first president of Chemung Canal Bank. He was born in Chemung in 1794, and served during the War of 1812, rising to the rank of Captain. A large land owner, he was prominent in politics and served first as Assemblyman and then as State Senator.

In 1902, Matthias Arnot, president, oversaw the consolidation of Chemung Canal Bank with the Elmira Trust Company, creating Chemung Canal Trust Company.

The bank moved to 129 East Water Street in 1920, and then to One Chemung Canal Plaza in 1971. In 1951, the bank began expanding and opened branches throughout the New York State and Northern Pennsylvania.

In 2011, the bank acquired the Fort Orange Financial Corp. and its subsidiary Capital Bank & Trust Company of Albany, New York, expanding its network to the Albany area. As of June 30, 2026, Chemung Canal operates seven branch offices in the Capital Region as Capital Bank. The offices are located in Albany, Colonie, Slingerlands, Latham, Clifton Park, Schenectady and Wilton.

In 2024, the Canal Bank Division was created, expanding the Bank into the Western New York region. Its first office is located in Williamsville, New York.

Today, Chemung Canal Trust Company continues to operate as a full-service community bank and is the oldest locally owned and managed bank headquartered in New York State. The Bank offers a full suite of deposit, lending, treasury management, trust and wealth management services to consumers and businesses.

Chemung Financial Corporation (NASDAQ: CHMG) is the holding company of the Bank. Chemung Financial Corporation is also the parent of CFS Group, Inc., a financial services subsidiary offering non-traditional services including mutual funds, annuities, brokerage services, tax preparation services and insurance founded in 2001.
