= Jeffrey Schaler =

American psychologist

Jeffrey Alfred Schaler is a psychologist, author, editor, retired professor of justice, law, and society at American University, and former member of the psychology faculty at Johns Hopkins University. He is a prominent critic of psychiatric claims and practices, especially of treatment without consent. Schaler opposes the medicalization of addiction. He has had a private practice in existential therapy since the 1970s.

== Biography ==
In 1973, Schaler earned a Bachelor's degree in Human Interaction and Group Dynamics from the School for Social Research and Action at Antioch College, Yellow Springs, Ohio, satellite campus in Baltimore, Md. He received a Master of Education from the University of Maryland in 1986. He obtained a Doctorate of Philosophy from the University of Maryland in 1993 with a dissertation titled, Addiction Beliefs of Treatment Providers: Factors Explaining Variance.

Schaler has authored scores of articles for academic and popular publications. He was editor-in-chief of Current Psychology: A Journal for Diverse Perspectives on Diverse Psychological Issues from 2005 to 2014. He has edited several books, including Szasz Under Fire: The Psychiatric Abolitionist Faces His Critics, Peter Singer Under Fire: The Moral Iconoclast Faces Critics, and Howard Gardner Under Fire: The Rebel Psychologist Faces His Critics. He is a co-editor of and contributor to Thomas S. Szasz: The Man and His Ideas. Many of Schaler's views on mental health and addiction intersect with those of his long-time friend and associate, Thomas Szasz, whose authorized web site he created and maintains. He was awarded the Thomas Szasz Award for Outstanding Contributions to the Cause of Civil Liberties by the Center for Independent Thought in 1999. In February 2006, Schaler accepted the Thomas S. Szasz Award from the Citizens Commission on Human Rights.

Schaler is best known as the author of Addiction Is a Choice, in which he challenges the widely held view that addiction has a physiological basis. Schaler asserts that "the contention that addiction is a disease is empirically unsupported. Addiction is a behavior and thus clearly intended by the individual person.” He argues that what is called “addiction” is actually "an ethical, not medical, problem in living". Schaler opposes the war on drugs, echoing John Stuart Mill in contending that "Government should protect us from other people, but government should not protect us from ourselves. That rule applies to cigarette smoking, to drug use, alcohol use, and to all kinds of behaviors". In 2016, Addiction is a Choice was released as an audiobook.

Schaler resides in Ellicott City, Maryland.

== Additional publications, partial ==
- Smoking: Who Has The Right?
- Drugs: Should We Legalize, Decriminalize, Or Deregulate?
- Mental health Trojan horse
- Living and Dying The State's Way
- Moral Hygiene
- Turning political disagreement into a disease
- Over 50 Years Ago Thomas Szasz Rocked the World of Psychiatry
- Strategies of Psychiatric Coercion
