= California School of Professional Psychology =

Graduate school of psychology in California

California School of Professional Psychology at Alliant International University
- Other name: CSPP
- Type: Private, Graduate
- Established: 1969
- Affiliations: Alliant International University
- President: Andy Vaughn
- Dean: David G. Stewart
- Location: Los Angeles, San Diego, San Francisco, Sacramento, Fresno, California, United States
- Campus: Fresno Irvine Los Angeles Sacramento San Diego Emeryville / San Francisco
- Website: alliant.edu/cspp

The California School of Professional Psychology (CSPP) was founded in 1969 by the California Psychological Association. It is part of the for-profit Alliant International University where each campus's Clinical Psychology Psy.D. and Ph.D. program is individually accredited by the American Psychological Association. The school has trained approximately half of the licensed psychologists in California.

The school has degree programs in clinical psychology, marriage and family therapy, clinical counseling, Organizational Psychology, and psychopharmacology at campuses in San Francisco, Los Angeles, San Diego, Fresno, Sacramento, and Irvine, and abroad in Tokyo, Hong Kong and Mexico City. CSPP is one of a handful of APA-accredited schools that also offered a clinical doctoral respecialization in professional psychology.

== History ==
The California School of Professional Psychology (CSPP) was founded in 1969 under the guidance of the California Psychological Association. CSPP was the first free-standing school of professional psychology in the United States.

CSPP educates master's and doctoral-level psychologists in professional practice models and assures that its students and faculty are as diverse as the State of California. At its founding, CSPP worked out of borrowed or rented space with a volunteer (unpaid) faculty, but had a large number of student applicants who were attracted to the new training model.

The founding president of CSPP was Nick Cummings, Ph.D., who was succeeded by John O'Neill and subsequently by Judith Albino, Ph.D. (Mary Beth Kenkel, Ph.D. and Rodney L. Lowman, Ph.D. also served as interim presidents.) During the 2000s, under Albino's tenure, CSPP was renamed Alliant University, and the four separately accredited campuses—Fresno, Los Angeles, San Diego, and San Francisco—were combined into a single WASC-accredited institution. The name was subsequently changed to Alliant International University after Alliant merged with United States International University (USIU), based in San Diego. Today, CSPP is one of several schools that comprise Alliant International University including a school of education, forensic psychology, management and leadership, and a law school. CSPP remains the largest of the schools.

CSPP was first accredited by the Western Association of Schools and Colleges (WASC) in 1977. By the mid-1980s all of its Clinical Psychology programs were accredited by the American Psychological Association. Its Marriage and Family Therapy programs are accredited by the Commission on Accreditation for Marriage and Family Therapy Education of the American Association of Marriage and Family Therapy (AAMFT), and its Master of Arts in Clinical Counseling is accredited by the Council for Accreditation of Counseling & Related Educational Programs (CACREP). Each psychology doctorate degree program (Ph.D. or Psy.D.) on each campus is accredited individually by the American Psychological Association.

== Program degrees ==
CSPP degree programs:

- Clinical Psychology – Ph.D. and Psy.D.
- Marriage and Family Therapy – MA and Ph.D.
- Clinical Counseling Psychology – MA (licensure as LPCC)
- Industrial-Organizational Psychology (Organization Behavior/ Development) – MA, Ph.D., Psy.D.
- Clinical Psychopharmacology – Post-doctoral MS
- Social Work - MSW
- Doctoral Respecialization in Professional Psychology

== Accreditation ==
- Alliant International University is accredited by the Western Association of Schools and Colleges (WASC)
- Clinical Psychology Psy.D. and Ph.D. programs are individually accredited by the American Psychological Association at every campus.
- Marriage and Family Therapy programs is accredited by the Commission on Accreditation for Marriage and Family Therapy Education of the American Association of Marriage and Family Therapy (AAMFT).

== Awards ==
The Los Angeles PsyD in Clinical Psychology program was the 2010 recipient of the Suinn Minority Achievement Program Award from the American Psychological Association for excellence in recruitment, retention, and graduation of ethnic minority students, and for its overall commitment to cultural diversity in all department activities.

== Notable professors ==
Notable current and former professors include:

- Maurizio Andolfi
- Ivan Boszormenyi-Nagy
- John V. Caffaro
- David B Cheek
- Andrew Curry
- Sean Davis
- Sharon L. Foster
- James Framo
- Viktor Frankl
- Jay Haley
- Susan Johnson
- Alan S. Kaufman
- Rodney L. Lowman
- Abraham Maslow
- Valory Mitchell
- Rhoda Olkin
- Norman Paul
- Susan Regas
- Carl Rogers
- Virginia Satir
- Carl Whitaker

== Notable alumni ==
- Phil Barnhart, member of the Oregon House of Representatives
- Judy Chu, first Chinese-American woman elected to the United States Congress
- Robin Corsiglia, former Olympic swimmer, sports psychologist at University of Southern California (USC) University Park Health Center
- Christine E. Dickson, American cognitive psychologist
- Peggy Drexler, Cornell University professor and author
- Lisa Firestone, author, editor of PsychAlive, and Director of Research and Education at The Glendon Association
- Missy Gold, former child actress
- Gordon Muir Giles, psychologist and researcher, professor at Samuel Merritt University, known for his research in traumatic brain injury
- Debra F. Glaser, former and first female chief psychologist for the Los Angeles Police Department, first psychologist to be an ABPP Board Certified in Police and Public Safety Psychology, professor at Alliant International University
- Nathan Hare, author, activist, former associate professor at Howard University, member of the NAACP team that argued Brown v. Board of Education
- Robin Holmes-Sullivan, psychologist, president of Lewis & Clark College
- Marc Kern, author and addiction treatment specialist
- Davina Kotulski, author and LGBT advocate
- Glenn S. Lipson, director of Program Forensic Psychology Department Alliant International University San Diego Campus
- Kevin F. McCready, psychologist, founder, and director of the San Joaquin Psychotherapy Center and the non-profit Recovery for Emotionally Abused Children (R.E.A.Ch.)
- Sandra Tong, interim Fire Chief of the San Francisco Fire Department
- Rose Weahkee, director Division of Behavioral Health, Indian Health Service, U.S. Department of Health and Human Services (HHS)
- Robin Zasio, clinical psychologist
