= Alliant University =

University in San Diego, California, US

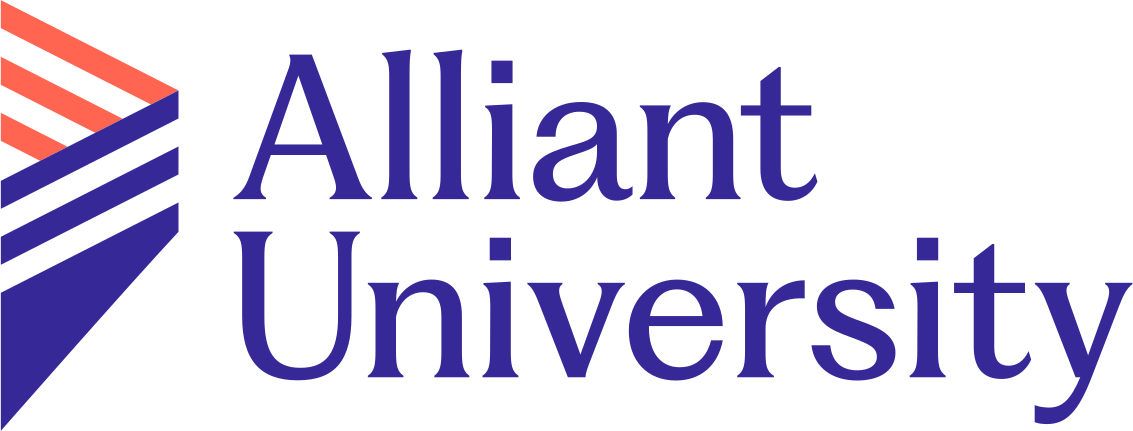
- Type: Private for-profit university
- Established: 1952 - United States International University (USIU); 1969 - California School of Professional Psychology (CSPP); 2001 - Merger of USIU and CSPP
- Parent institution: Bertelsmann Education Group
- President: Andy Vaughn
- Provost: David Stewart
- Students: 3,871
- Undergraduates: 421
- Postgraduates: 3,450
- Campuses: Fresno, Irvine, Los Angeles, Sacramento, San Diego, San Francisco, Phoenix
- Website: www.alliant.edu

Alliant University is a private for-profit university with its main campus in San Diego, five additional campuses in California (San Francisco, Los Angeles, Irvine, Sacramento, and Fresno) and one campus in Phoenix, Arizona. Its enrollment is approximately 4,000 students, of whom 95% are graduate students.

== History ==
Alliant was formed in 2001 by the combination of two older institutions: the California School of Professional Psychology (CSPP) and United States International University (USIU). Like the institutions that it descended from, Alliant has its home campus in San Diego, California. Until 2007, USIU also had a Europe campus in a former public school in the UK, which was used as a site for many films, including the Harry Potter series.

USIU is the descendant of the original Balboa School of Law founded by Leland Ghent Stanford as a private graduate institution in 1924. The name was changed to Balboa University and then, in 1952, to California Western University. With the name change to California Western University the school relocated to an oceanside campus in Point Loma (the site of present-day Point Loma Nazarene University). In 1968, the school's name was changed to United States International University with the vision to become a global university. Land was purchased for a new campus in Scripps Ranch, and all USIU operations were moved there by 1973. The law school, however, retained the name of California Western School of Law and moved to a new downtown location. In 1975 it split off to become an independent institution that is still in operation.

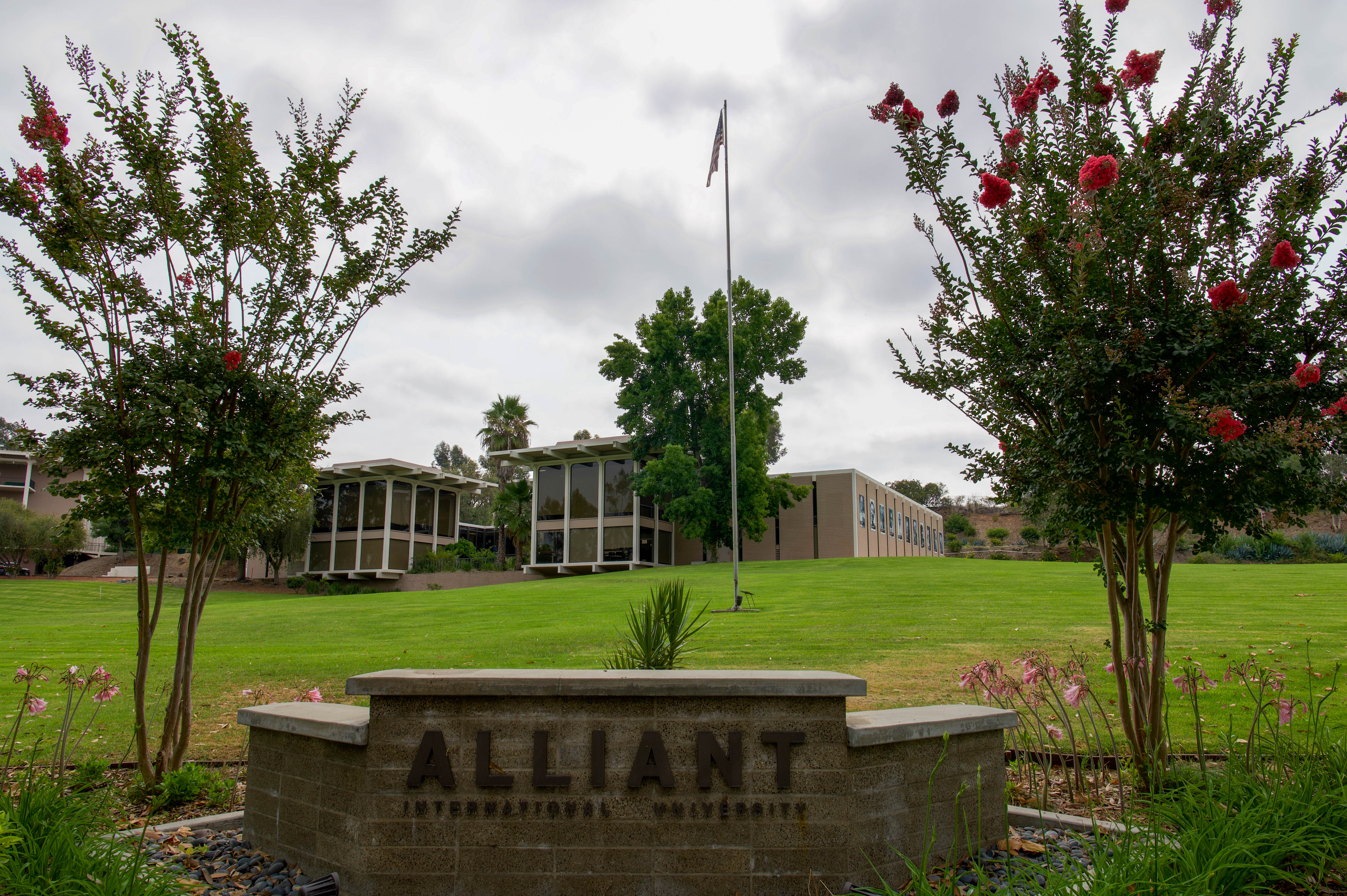
The entrance to the San Diego campus

William C. Rust was the president of California Western University who ushered in the transformation to USIU and led the school for the next 37 years. Rust's vision was "to create global understanding through a single university with campuses all over the world.". The founding goal for USIU was a focus on "human excellence" over "intellectual excellence." By 1971, Rust had transformed the former small liberal arts school of California Western University into what the San Diego Reader referred to as an "international phenomenon." Besides the main Scripps Ranch campus, USIU had developed a network of campuses both nationally in Maui, Steamboat Springs, and Guam as well as internationally, with branch campuses in: London, Mexico City, Tokyo and Nairobi. In 1986, Rust was still breaking new ground for buildings and maintaining a focus on further expansion in Latin America, the Middle East, Europe, and Russia. But by 1990, after 37 years of leading the university and enduring several rocky financial episodes, Rust was removed of all governing power by the board of trustees. Gary Hays, former chancellor of the Minnesota State University, took over as president of USIU in April 1990 and reorganized the University into just two remaining colleges; arts and sciences and business administration. In 1999, the Nairobi campus became its own independent entity known as United States International University Africa.

In 2001 the California School of Professional Psychology and United States International University merged to become Alliant International University, taking over the Scripps Ranch campus of USIU. At first Alliant was a nonprofit university like its predecessors. In February 2015, Alliant became a for-profit benefit corporation and part of the Arist Education System, a subsidiary of Bertelsmann.

In January 2026, Alliant International University rebranded as Alliant University to reflect the institution’s transition to a primarily U.S.-based university.

== Schools ==
Alliant University is composed of several academic schools:

- California School of Professional Psychology The California School of Professional Psychology (CSPP) was founded in 1969 under the auspices of the California Psychological Association. CSPP offers programs in clinical psychology, clinical counseling, and marital and family therapy.
- California School of Management & Leadership In 2011, Alliant International University renamed their management school to Alliant School of Management then to California School of Management & Leadership in 2018. Formerly the Marshall Goldsmith School of Management, named for organizational consultant and executive coach Marshall Goldsmith, the School of Management offers a 4-year BSBA program, master's and doctoral degrees in Business, Management, and Leadership.
- California School of Education The California School of Education offers programs in teaching, school psychology, educational leadership, and teaching English to speakers of other languages.
- California School of Forensic Studies The California School of Forensic Studies offers programs in criminology and criminal justice.
- School of Nursing and Health Sciences which was opened in Phoenix, Arizona in 2023 and offers a Bachelor of Science in Nursing and a direct entry Master of Science in Nursing.
- San Francisco Law School San Francisco Law School became a constituent school of Alliant International University in 2010.

== Accreditation ==
Alliant, including all of its programs, is accredited by the WASC Senior College and University Commission.

- The university's education programs are approved by the California State Board of Education.
- Alliant's teach credentialing programs are approved by the California Commission on Teacher Credentialing.
- Clinical psychology programs are accredited by the American Psychological Association (APA).
- Alliant's marital and family therapy programs are accredited by the Commission on Accreditation for Marriage and Family Therapy Education.
- Alliant's clinical counseling program is accredited by Council for Accreditation of Counseling and Related Educational Programs (CACREP) cacrep.org
- The Bachelor and Master of Science in Nursing programs at Alliant are accredited by the Commission on Collegiate Nursing Education (CCNE).
- The Master of Social Work program at Alliant is accredited by the Council on Social Work Education (CSWE).
- Alliant’s entry-level occupational therapy master’s degree program has applied for accreditation and has been granted Candidacy Status by the Accreditation Council for Occupational Therapy Education (ACOTE) of the American Occupational Therapy Association (AOTA).

== Locations ==
- San Diego, California at 32°53′51″N 117°05′35″W
- Los Angeles, California at 34°04′51″N 118°09′06″W
- Fresno, California at 36°46′03″N 119°43′20″W
- San Francisco Bay Area, California
- Irvine, California
- Sacramento, California
- Phoenix, Arizona
- Mexico City, Mexico
- Tokyo, Japan
- Nairobi, Kenya

== Recognition ==
Alliant was included in GI Jobs magazine's 2013 list of Military-Friendly Schools, the third year in a row the university had been included in this listing. It was also included on the Military Times EDGE magazine's list of Best for Vets Colleges in 2010 and 2011; in 2011, Alliant was ranked #10 on the list, making it the highest-ranked non-traditional university in California.

== Athletics ==
During the 1980s and 1990s, prior to its merger with Alliant, the USIU Gulls fielded several Division I teams. The football team produced six professional football players and was once briefly coached by the legendary player and coach Sid Gillman. USIU's international student body allowed it to field a competitive NCAA Division I hockey team, the USIU Gulls, which was the only NCAA team "west of the Rockies." However, in 1990 after 10 successful years and producing two NHL players, the program was dropped due to the rising cost of traveling to distant campuses to compete. USIU also maintained an NCAA Division I basketball team. USIU's women's softball team appeared in one Women's College World Series in 1982.

Alliant University maintained a sports program for a few years but phased out its intercollegiate athletics programs in 2007.

== Notable alumni ==
- Cheryl Arutt, retired actor, clinical and forensic psychologist
- Barry Black, Rear Admiral and Chaplain of the United States Senate
- Judy Chu, Member of the US House of Representatives from California
- Denise Merrill, Connecticut Secretary of the State
- Kerry Rossall, stuntman and actor
- Reiko True, clinical psychologist

== Notable faculty ==
- Igor Ansoff, faculty 1983–2002
- Nick Cummings, faculty 1969–1981
- Viktor Frankl, faculty 1970–1981
- Jay Douglas Haley, faculty 1998–2007
- Paul Hersey, faculty 1978–1979 and 2006–2012
- Max Lerner, faculty 1973–1981
- Donald Templer, retired as of 2014.

== See also ==
- Japan Campus of Foreign Universities
