= SMART Recovery =

Secular organization for recovery from addiction

- Abbreviation: SMART
- Formation: 1994; 32 years ago
- Type: Secular peer support organization
- Headquarters: 7304 Mentor Avenue; Suite F Mentor, Ohio 44060
- Region served: International (meetings in 36 countries; materials in 16 languages)
- Services: In-person and online mutual-aid meetings; meetings in correctional facilities; online resources for participants and facilitators
- Methods: Motivational interviewing/MET; CBT; REBT
- Official language: 16 languages (program materials/meetings)
- Parent organization: SMART Recovery International (est. 2017)
- Website: www.smartrecovery.org

SMART Recovery is an international community of peer support groups that aims to help people recover from addictive and problematic behaviors. SMART stands for Self-Management and Recovery Training. The SMART approach is secular and research-based. The SMART model is built on psychological tools of cognitive behavioral therapy and motivational interviewing, and was initially developed by medical professionals seeking more effective methods to treat patients. SMART Recovery is used with a range of addictive and problematic behaviors (alcohol, drugs, gambling, overeating, internet use, etc.).

SMART is established in more than 20 countries. Meetings of SMART participants are held throughout the week, both in person and online. These meetings, which run from 60 to 90 minutes each, are confidential, free, and guided by trained volunteer or professional facilitators. Participants in various stages of recovery, or simply curious about pursuing recovery, share lessons and challenges from their own journeys, while exploring, through discussion, a suite of scientifically grounded psychology tools and techniques.

== Methodology ==
SMART Recovery is based on scientific knowledge and is intended to evolve as scientific knowledge evolves. The program uses principles of motivational interviewing, found in motivational enhancement therapy (MET), and techniques taken from rational emotive behavior therapy (REBT), and cognitive-behavioral therapy (CBT), as well as scientifically validated research on treatment. The SMART Recovery Program and meetings are congenial to participants who choose to use appropriately-prescribed medications, including opioid-agonist medications, as part of their recovery programs.

The organization's program emphasizes four areas, called the 4-Point Program, in the process of recovery: Building Motivation, Coping with Urges, Problem Solving, and Lifestyle Balance. The "SMART Toolbox" is a collection of various MET, CBT, and REBT methods, or "tools", which address the 4 Points.

SMART Recovery can be used as a stand-alone primary recovery support program for those seeking help recovering from addictions, but does not insist on being exclusive. The program does not use the 12 steps that make up the basis of the various "Anonymous" self-help groups (e.g., Alcoholics Anonymous (AA), Narcotics Anonymous (NA), etc.) and is generally listed as an "Alternative to AA" or an "Alternative to the 12 Steps." SMART Recovery believes that each individual finds their own path to recovery. Though listed as an "alternative", it is also suggested as a possible "supplement" to twelve-step programs in SMART Recovery's main program publication, The SMART Recovery Handbook.

=== Stages of change ===
SMART Recovery recognizes that participants may be in one or more of various stages of change and that different exercises may be helpful at different stages.

1. Precontemplation – At this stage, the participant may not realize that they have a problem.
2. Contemplation – The participant evaluates the advantages and disadvantages of the addiction by performing a cost/benefit analysis.
3. Determination/Preparation – The participant decides to pursue personal change, and may complete a Change Plan Worksheet.
4. Action – The participant seeks out new ways of handling their addiction behavior. This can include self-help, the support of addiction help group or professional guidance.
5. Maintenance – After a few months, the participant's behavior has been changed and now seeks to maintain their gains.
6. Graduation/Exit – Once a participant has sustained a long period of change, they may choose to move on with their lives and "graduate" from SMART Recovery.

Side event: Lapse/Relapse – Although not inevitable, lapses and relapses are a normal part of the change cycle and if handled well, can serve as a learning experience in overcoming an addiction.

== Meetings ==
SMART Recovery meetings are free for all wishing to attend and are intended to be informational as well as supportive. Over 1500 weekly group meetings led by volunteer facilitators are held worldwide. In addition, the organization provides online resources and support to the volunteers and those attending the groups and one or more daily online meetings.

Meetings are also held in correctional facilities in many states, including: Arizona, California, Florida, Indiana, Maryland, Massachusetts, Michigan, Minnesota, Missouri, New Jersey, New York, Vermont, Virginia, Washington, and Wisconsin.

SMART hosts both large scale meetings and specific meetings tailored to prison inmates, military personnel, the LBGTQIA+ communities, young adults and family and friends of people engaged in or trying to achieve independence from addictive and problematic behaviors.

== Effectiveness ==
A 2018 longitudinal study compared the self-reported success of SMART Recovery, LifeRing Secular Recovery, Women for Sobriety, and Alcoholics Anonymous. After normalizing for income and other demographic factors, the study saw that SMART Recovery fared worse across the outcomes of alcohol abstinence, alcohol drinking problems, and total abstinence, compared to Alcoholics Anonymous. However, after normalizing for treatment goal, SMART Recovery members who pursued abstinence did as well across all three factors as members of AA. In other words, among AA members and members of SMART Recovery who wanted to abstain, there was no significant difference in the success rate.

== History ==
The first SMART Recovery meeting was held in the United States in 1994, and the organization established its original headquarters in Mentor, Ohio. As interest grew, SMART meetings spread into Canada, the United Kingdom and Australia. Thirty years later, the expansion is ongoing, with SMART meetings now held in 36 countries and 16 languages.

In 2017, SMART Recovery International (SRI) was established. SRI is the governing body for the global SMART Recovery community. SRI is overseen by a Board of international Directors mostly drawn from national SMART Recovery organizations. It receives advice from the SMART Recovery Global Research Committee. SMART affiliates in individual countries maintain their own governance structures as independent entities that are licensed to use the SMART Recovery intellectual property by SMART Recovery International. Specific program offerings can differ among these entities. SMART Recovery relies on funding from voluntary donations, philanthropy and grants.

SMART Recovery also offers for sale a Participant Handbook and other related publications.

== Recognition ==
The following organizations recognize SMART Recovery.

United States

- American Academy of Family Physicians
- National Institute on Alcohol Abuse and Alcoholism (NIAAA) – NIAAA is an agency of the National Institutes of Health (NIH), a component of the U.S. Department of Health and Human Services.
- National Institute on Drug Abuse (NIDA)
- Substance Abuse and Mental Health Services Administration (SAMHSA)

United Kingdom

- Public Health England
- National Institute of Health and Care Excellence (NICE)
- Recovery Orientated Drug Treatment Expert Group (RODT)
- Advisory Council on the Misuse of Drugs (ACMD)

Australia

- Lifeline
- Turning Point Alcohol and Drug Centre

== See also ==
- Drug addiction recovery groups
