= List of Alaska Nanooks men's ice hockey seasons =

This is a list of seasons completed by the University of Alaska Fairbanks men's ice hockey team.

Alaska has made two NCAA tournament appearances in its history. However, as a result of NCAA rules violations, the berth in 2010 has been vacated and Alaska officially has never played in a Division I national tournament.

NCAA D-I Champions	NCAA Frozen Four	Conference regular season champions	Conference Playoff Champions

Season	Conference	Regular season (Note: Code explanation; GP—Games Played, W—Wins, L—Losses, T—Tied games, 3/SW—Win in 3 on 3 overtime or shootout, Pts—Points*)												Conference Tournament Results	National Tournament Results
Season	Conference	Conference							Overall					Conference Tournament Results	National Tournament Results
Season	Conference	GP	W	L	T	3/SW	Pts*	Finish	GP	W	L	T	%	Conference Tournament Results	National Tournament Results
No Coach (1925 — 1926)
1925–26	Independent	–	–	–	–	–	–	–	4	3	1	0	.750		
Program Suspended
No Coach (1932 — 1935)
1932–33	Independent	–	–	–	–	–	–	–	7	4	3	0	.571		
1933–34	Independent	–	–	–	–	–	–	–	3	2	0	1	.833		
1934–35	Independent	–	–	–	–	–	–	–	3	2	1	0	.667		
Alfred Bastress (1935 — 1939)
1935–36	Independent	–	–	–	–	–	–	–	2	1	1	0	.500		
1936–37	Independent	–	–	–	–	–	–	–	3	0	3	0	.000		
1937–38	Independent	–	–	–	–	–	–	–	3	2	1	0	.667		
1938–39	Independent	–	–	–	–	–	–	–	3	1	1	1	.500		
No Coach (1939 — 1940)
1939–40	Independent	–	–	–	–	–	–	–	3	0	2	1	.167		
Joe Gerlach (1940 — 1941)
1940–41	Independent	–	–	–	–	–	–	–	2	1	1	0	.500		
Program Suspended due to World War II
Coach Urick (1950 — 1951)
1950–51	Independent	–	–	–	–	–	–	–	6	0	6	0	.000		
Program Suspended
Coach Gilhooley (1953 — 1954)
1953–54	Independent	–	–	–	–	–	–	–	3	0	3	0	.000		
Chris Christensen (1954 — 1955)
1954–55	Independent	–	–	–	–	–	–	–	4	1	3	0	.250		
Program Suspended
Ken Smith (1956 — 1957)
1956–57	Independent	–	–	–	–	–	–	–	5	1	4	0	.200		
Bill Borland (1957 — 1958)
1957–58	Independent	–	–	–	–	–	–	–	4	2	2	0	.500		
Program Suspended
Bill Daltri (1960 — 1963)
1960–61	Independent	–	–	–	–	–	–	–	16	14	2	0	.875		
1961–62	Independent	–	–	–	–	–	–	–	12	10	1	1	.875		
1962–63	Independent	–	–	–	–	–	–	–	8	8	0	0	1.000		
Larry Bidlake (1963 — 1964)
1963–64	Independent	–	–	–	–	–	–	–	13	8	5	0	.615		
University Division
Jack Peterson (1964 — 1965)
1964–65	Independent	–	–	–	–	–	–	–	9	5	4	0	.556		
Ed Armstrong (1965 — 1966)
1965–66	Independent	–	–	–	–	–	–	–	7	1	6	0	.143		
No Coach (1966 — 1967)
1966–67	Independent	–	–	–	–	–	–	–	3	1	2	0	.333		
Jim Perry (1967 — 1969)
1967–68	Independent	–	–	–	–	–	–	–	8	2	6	0	.250		
1968–69	Independent	–	–	–	–	–	–	–	9	3	6	0	.333		
Fred Stevenson (1969 — 1971)
1969–70	Independent	–	–	–	–	–	–	–	12	4	7	1	.375		
1970–71	Independent	–	–	–	–	–	–	–	28	13	14	1	.084		
Gary Weitz (1971 — 1972)
1971–72	Independent	–	–	–	–	–	–	–	11	6	5	0	.545		
Ray Korkiala (1972 — 1973)
1972–73	Independent	–	–	–	–	–	–	–	25	14	10	1	.580		
Division II
Bob Gaddis (1973 — 1974)
1973–74	Independent	–	–	–	–	–	–	–	8	1	7	0	.125		
Program Suspended
Tim Homan (1977 — 1978)
1977–78	Independent	–	–	–	–	–	–	–	18	14	3	1	.806		
Program Suspended
Unknown Coach (1979 — 1980)
1979–80	Independent	–	–	–	–	–	–	–	21	7	14	0			
Ric Schafer (1980 — 1987)
1980–81	Independent	–	–	–	–	–	–	–	22	0	22	0	.000		
1981–82	Independent	–	–	–	–	–	–	–	23	2	21	0	.087		
1982–83	Independent	–	–	–	–	–	–	–	26	19	7	0	.731		
1983–84	Independent	–	–	–	–	–	–	–	29	22	7	0	.759		Lost National semifinal series, 8–13 (Bemidji State)
Division I
1984–85	Independent	–	–	–	–	–	–	–	34	21	12	1	.632		
1985–86	Great West	12	6	5	1	-	13	2nd	25	17	7	1	.700		
1986–87	Great West	16	7	9	0	-	14	3rd	27	17	10	0	.630		
Don Lucia (1987 — 1993)
1987–88	Great West	8	5	3	0	-	10	1st	31	20	9	2	.677		
1988–89	Independent	–	–	–	–	–	–	–	38	23	12	3	.645		
1989–90	Independent	–	–	–	–	–	–	–	30	10	20	0	.333		
1990–91	Independent	–	–	–	–	–	–	–	35	17	16	2	.514		
1991–92	Independent	–	–	–	–	–	–	–	36	17	17	2	.500		
1992–93	Independent	–	–	–	–	–	–	–	37	23	12	2	.649		
Dave Laurion (1993 — 1999)
1993–94	Independent	–	–	–	–	–	–	–	38	24	13	1	.645		
1994–95	CCHA	–	–	–	–	–	–	–	33	11	21	1	.348		
1995–96	CCHA	30	8	22	0	-	16	T–9th	34	10	23	1	.309		
1996–97	CCHA	27	8	18	1	-	17	8th	37	14	22	1	.392	Lost Quarterfinal series, 0–2 (Michigan)	
1997–98	CCHA	30	7	20	3	-	17	10th	35	10	21	4	.343		
1998–99	CCHA	30	8	21	1	-	17	11th	34	11	22	1	.338		
Guy Gadowsky (1999 — 2004)
1999–00	CCHA	28	4	22	2	-	10	12th	34	6	25	3	.221		
2000–01	CCHA	28	7	14	7	-	21	T–9th	36	9	19	8	.361	Lost Quarterfinal series, 0–2 (Michigan State)	
2001–02	CCHA	28	15	10	3	-	33	4th	37	22	12	3	.635	Won First round series, 2–0 (Ferris State); Lost Quarterfinal, 5–6 (OT) (Ohio State)	
2002–03	CCHA	28	10	11	7	-	27	T–8th	36	15	14	7	.514	Lost First round series, 0–2 (Michigan State)	
2003–04	CCHA	28	14	13	1	-	29	6th	36	16	19	1	.458	Lost First round series, 0–2 (Northern Michigan)	
Tavis MacMillan (2004 — 2007)
2004–05	CCHA	28	11	14	3	-	25	8th	37	17	16	4	.514	Won First round series, 2–0 (Bowling Green); Won Quarterfinal, 6–3 (Northern Michigan); Lost Semifinal, 1–3 (Michigan); Won Third Place, 3–2 (Michigan State)	
2005–06	CCHA	28	11	13	4	-	26	T–8th	39	18	16	5	.526	Won First round series, 2–0 (Notre Dame); Lost Quarterfinal series, 1–2 (Michigan State)	
2006–07	CCHA	28	7	16	5	-	19	11th	39	11	22	6	.359	Won First round series, 2–1 (Western Michigan); Lost Quarterfinal series, 0–2 (Notre Dame)	
Doc DelCastillo (2007 — 2008)
2007–08	CCHA	28	0†	28†	0†	-	20	T-9th	35	0†	35†	0†	.000	Lost First round series, 0–3 (Nebraska–Omaha)	
Dallas Ferguson (2008 — 2017)
2008–09	CCHA	28	0†	28†	0†	0†	34	4th	39	0†	39†	0†	.000	Won Quarterfinal series, 0–3 (Ohio State); Lost Semifinal, 1–3 (Michigan); Lost Third Place, 0–2 (Northern Michigan)	
2009–10	CCHA	28	0†	28†	0†	0†	45	5th	39	0†	39†	0†	.000	Won First round series, 0–2 (Western Michigan); Lost Quarterfinal Series, 0–2 (Northern Michigan)	Lost Regional semifinal, 1–3 (Boston College) [Vacated]
2010–11	CCHA	28	0†	28†	0†	0†	38	7th	38	0†	38†	0†	.000	Won First round series, 0–2 (Michigan State); Lost Quarterfinal Series, 0–2 (Miami)	
2011–12	CCHA	28	0†	28†	0†	0†	30	10th	36	0†	36†	0†	.000	Lost First round series, 0–2 (Lake Superior State)	
2012–13	CCHA	28	12	13	3	1	40	6th	37	17	16	4	.514	Lost First round series, 1–2 (Michigan State)	
2013–14	WCHA	28	14	12	2	–	30	T-3rd	37	18	15	4	.541	Lost First round series, 1–2 (Alaska–Anchorage)	
2014–15	WCHA	28	14	12	2	–	30	4th	34	19	13	2	.588	Ineligible	
2015–16	WCHA	28	8	16	4	–	20	8th	36	10	22	4	.333	Lost First round series, 1–2 (Minnesota State)	
2016–17	WCHA	28	11	13	4	3	40	6th	36	12	20	4	.389	Lost First round series, 0–2 (Minnesota State)	
Lance West (2017 — 2018)
2017–18	WCHA	28	9	17	2	1	30	8th	36	11	22	3	.347	Lost First round series, 0–2 (Minnesota State)	
Erik Largen (2018 — Present)
2018–19	WCHA	28	12	14	2	2	40	7th	36	12	21	3	.375	Lost First round series, 0–2 (Northern Michigan)	
2019–20	WCHA	28	14	9	5	2	49	T–4th	36	16	15	5	.514	Lost Quarterfinal series, 0–2 (Bowling Green)	
2020–21	WCHA	Season Cancelled													
2021–22	Independent	–	–	–	–	–	–	–	34	14	18	2	.441		
2022–23	Independent	–	–	–	–	–	–	–	34	22	10	2	.676		
2023–24	Independent	–	–	–	–	–	–	–	34	17	14	3	.544		
2024–25	Independent	–	–	–	–	–	–	–	32	12	14	6	.469		
2024–25	Independent	–	–	–	–	–	–	–	33	15	15	3	.500	Won UCHC Semifinal, 4–4 (SOW) (Stonehill); Won UCHC Championship, 4–3 (OT) (Lindenwood)	
Totals									GP	W	L	T	%	Championships	
Regular season									1741	725	905	111	.448	1 Great West Championship	
Conference Post-season									63	15	47	1	.246	1 UCHC Championship	
NCAA Post-season									2	0	2	0	.000	1 NCAA Tournament Appearance (1 vacated appearance)	
Regular season and Post-season Record									1806	740	954	112	.441		

* Winning percentage is used when conference schedules are unbalanced.
† Alaska was required to retroactively forfeit all wins and ties from 2007 through 2012 as a result of using academically ineligible players. Additionally the team was banned from participating in any playoff games during the 2014–15 season.
