= Northern Arizona Lumberjacks men's ice hockey =

College ice hockey program

- University: Northern Arizona University
- First season: 1981–82
- Head coach: Dan Carrick (D2); Jacob Smets (D3)
- Arena: Jay Lively Activity Center; Flagstaff, Arizona
- Colors: Blue and gold

ACHA tournament appearances
- 2007, 2009, 2011, 2012, 2013

Conference regular season champions
- 2013

The Northern Arizona Lumberjacks men's ice hockey team is a college ice hockey program that represents Northern Arizona University. They are a member of the American Collegiate Hockey Association at the Division II, West Coast Hockey Conference and Division III, West Coast Hockey Conference. The university sponsored NCAA Division I ice hockey from 1981 to 1986.

== History ==
NAU founded its ice hockey program with the help of ACHA Hall of Fame Coach Gerald Caple in 1971 after the completion of the Flagstaff Ice Rink. A native of International Falls, Minnesota, Dr. Caple established the Lumberjack club hockey program in Flagstaff, Arizona while teaching at NAU as a chemistry professor. For more than a decade, Dr. Caple organized, advised, managed and coached the fledgling NAU hockey team, spending countless hours and untold amounts of money in order to develop and build the 'Jacks into a highly competitive collegiate hockey program. With the popularity of the club increasing, the team moved into the much larger Walkup Skydome in 1977 and, with continued interest, the university began sponsoring the program as a Division I sport in 1981. Northern Arizona was handicapped with a difficult travel schedule but the school was still supportive of their fledgling program and the Lumberjacks made strides, improving by 11 wins in their second year. Head coach Jimmy Peters Jr. got the team up to 21 wins before leaving the program in 1984 and was replaced by John Mason. In 1985 Northern Arizona joined with Alaska–Anchorage, Alaska–Fairbanks and U.S. International to form the Great West Hockey Conference. NAU finished 3rd in the conference but had several problems: the Walkup Skydome was in need of serious and expensive repair, the state had cut the university's budget for the next fiscal cycle and NAU was required to meet Title IX guidelines. With all of those issues the university suspended the program and ended the Lumberjacks time in D-I hockey.

After several years of nonexistence the program was brought back in 1991 as a club sport and returned to the Flagstaff Ice Rink (since renamed the Jay Lively Activity Center) where it continues as two separate ACHA teams.

== Season-by-season results ==
| NCAA D-I Champions | NCAA Frozen Four | Conference Regular Season Champions | Conference Playoff Champions |

| Season | Conference | Regular Season (Note: Code explanation; GP—Games Played, W—Wins, L—Losses, T—Tied games, Pts—Points) | | | | | | | | | | | Conference Tournament Results | National Tournament Results |
| Season | Conference | Conference | | | | | | Overall | | | | | Conference Tournament Results | National Tournament Results |
| Season | Conference | GP | W | L | T | Pts* | Finish | GP | W | L | T | % | Conference Tournament Results | National Tournament Results |
|---|---|---|---|---|---|---|---|---|---|---|---|---|---|---|
Jimmy Peters Jr. (1981–1984)
| 1981–82 | Independent | – | – | – | – | – | – | 24 | 6 | 18 | 0 | .250 | | |
| 1982–83 | Independent | – | – | – | – | – | – | 29 | 17 | 11 | 1 | .603 | | |
| 1983–84 | Independent | – | – | – | – | – | – | 27 | 21 | 6 | 0 | .778 | | |
John Mason (1984–1986)
| 1984–85 | Independent | – | – | – | – | – | – | 30 | 12 | 18 | 0 | .400 | | |
| 1985–86 | GWHC | 12 | 5 | 7 | 0 | 10 | 3rd | 28 | 11 | 17 | 0 | .393 | | |
| Totals | | | | | | | | GP | W | L | T | % | Championships | |
| Regular Season | | | | | | | | 138 | 67 | 70 | 1 | .489 | | |
| Conference Post-season | | | | | | | | 0 | 0 | 0 | 0 | – | | |
| NCAA Post-season | | | | | | | | 0 | 0 | 0 | 0 | – | | |
| Regular Season and Post-season Record | | | | | | | | 138 | 67 | 70 | 1 | .489 | | |

== Lumberjacks in the NHL ==
| = NHL All-Star team | = NHL All-Star | = NHL All-Star and NHL All-Star team | = Hall of Famers |

| Player | Position | Team(s) | Years | Games | Stanley Cups |
|---|---|---|---|---|---|
| Greg Adams | Left wing | NJD, VAN, DAL, PHO, FLA | 1984–2001 | 1,056 | 0 |
| Bob Beers | Defenseman | BOS, TBL, EDM, NYI | 1989–1997 | 258 | 0 |
