= Darren Lowe =

Darren Lowe may refer to:

- Darren Lowe (ice hockey) (born 1960), Canadian player and coach
- Darren Lowe (lacrosse) (active 1989-2000), American player
