= United States International Gulls men's ice hockey =

- University: United States International University
- First season: 1979–80
- Arena: San Diego Ice Arena; San Diego, California

Conference regular season champions
- GWHC: 1986

The United States International Gulls men's ice hockey program represented United States International University in college ice hockey at the NCAA Division I level during the 1980s.

== History ==
In 1978 Ph.D candidate Maynard Howe, the former head coach of Maine at Portland–Gorham, put together the first hockey team for the university and, with the support of University President Dr. William Rust, the team was soon sponsored as an NCAA Division I program. The Gulls had early success, winning 24 games in their first season of NCAA play, but they could not keep that pace. USIU produced just 8 wins the following year (albeit in 21 games) and, after surging back with an 18-win year in 1982, the program put up losing records three straight seasons before Howe was replaced by former Minnesota head coach Brad Buetow. The new coach coincided with U.S. International forming the Great West Hockey Conference with Alaska–Anchorage, Alaska–Fairbanks and Northern Arizona.

In Buetow's first season he got the Gulls back on their winning ways, producing a 20 win season and winning the inaugural conference championship. After a mediocre second season the Gulls returned in force in 1987–88, winning 23 games and being a finalist for the last at-large bid to the 1988 NCAA Division I Men's Ice Hockey Tournament. 1988 was the last hurrah for the program, however. After Northern Arizona couldn't continue after their first season in the conference, USIU had only the Alaska schools as conference partners and travelling to the largest state was just as prohibitively as expensive as anywhere else in the country. The university had tried to induce several nearby schools to begin their own ice hockey programs, including USC, UCLA and Arizona but after three years the school was no longer able to financially support the program and it was shuttered.

== Season-by-season results ==
| NCAA D-I Champions | NCAA Frozen Four | Conference Regular Season Champions | Conference Playoff Champions |

| Season | Conference | Regular Season (Note: Code explanation; GP—Games Played, W—Wins, L—Losses, T—Tied games, Pts—Points) | | | | | | | | | | | Conference Tournament Results | National Tournament Results |
| Season | Conference | Conference | | | | | | Overall | | | | | Conference Tournament Results | National Tournament Results |
| Season | Conference | GP | W | L | T | Pts* | Finish | GP | W | L | T | % | Conference Tournament Results | National Tournament Results |
|---|---|---|---|---|---|---|---|---|---|---|---|---|---|---|
Maynard Howe (1979–1985)
| 1979–80 | Independent | – | – | – | – | – | – | 34 | 24 | 8 | 2 | .735 | | |
| 1980–81 | Independent | – | – | – | – | – | – | 21 | 8 | 13 | 0 | .381 | | |
| 1981–82 | Independent | – | – | – | – | – | – | 30 | 18 | 12 | 0 | .600 | | |
| 1982–83 | Independent | – | – | – | – | – | – | 32 | 13 | 17 | 2 | .438 | | |
| 1983–84 | Independent | – | – | – | – | – | – | 36 | 4 | 31 | 1 | .125 | | |
| 1984–85 | Independent | – | – | – | – | – | – | 32 | 7 | 23 | 2 | .250 | | |
Brad Buetow (1985–1988)
| 1985–86 | GWHC | 12 | 9 | 3 | 0 | 18 | 1st | 33 | 20 | 13 | 0 | .606 | | |
| 1986–87 | GWHC | 16 | 7 | 8 | 1 | 15 | 2nd | 35 | 17 | 17 | 1 | .500 | | |
| 1987–88 | GWHC | 8 | 4 | 4 | 0 | 8 | 2nd | 36 | 23 | 13 | 0 | .639 | | |
| Totals | | | | | | | | GP | W | L | T | % | Championships | |
| Regular Season | | | | | | | | 289 | 134 | 147 | 8 | .478 | 1 GWHC Championship | |
| Conference Post-season | | | | | | | | 0 | 0 | 0 | 0 | – | | |
| NCAA Post-season | | | | | | | | 0 | 0 | 0 | 0 | – | | |
| Regular Season and Post-season Record | | | | | | | | 289 | 134 | 147 | 8 | .478 | | |

== Olympians ==
This is a list of United States International alumni were a part of an Olympic team.

| Name | Position | United States International Tenure | Team | Year | Finish |
|---|---|---|---|---|---|
| Darren Lowe | Right Wing | 1979–1980 | (Canada) CAN | 1984 | 4th |

== Gulls in the NHL ==
| Player | Position | Team(s) | Years | Games | Stanley Cups |
|---|---|---|---|---|---|
| Darren Lowe | Right Wing | PIT | 1983–1984 | 8 | 0 |
| Pat Mayer | Defenseman | PIT | 1987–1988 | 1 | 0 |
