= Brad Buetow =

American ice hockey player and coach

Biographical details
- Born: October 28, 1950 (age 76); Saint Paul, Minnesota, U.S.

Playing career
- 1970–1973: Minnesota
- 1973–1974: Cleveland Crusaders
- 1973–1974: Jacksonville Barons
- Position: Left wing

Coaching career (HC unless noted)
- 1974–1979: Minnesota (assistant)
- 1979–1985: Minnesota
- 1985–1988: U.S. International
- 1988–1993: Colorado College
- 1993–1994: Olimpija
- 1995–1996: Quad City Mallards
- 1996–1997: Waco Wizards

Head coaching record
- Overall: 299-236-19

Accomplishments and honors

Championships
- 1976 NCAA National Champion (assistant); 1979 NCAA national champion (assistant); 1980 WCHA tournament champion 1981 WCHA regular season champion 1981 WCHA tournament champion 1983 WCHA tournament champion 1986 Great West regular season champion

Awards
- 1980 WCHA Coach of the Year; 1992 WCHA Coach of the Year

Bradly Buetow (born October 28, 1950) is an American retired ice hockey player and coach. In college, he played for the Minnesota Golden Gophers. He played 25 regular season games in the World Hockey Association for the Cleveland Crusaders and 37 games for the Jacksonville Barons of the American Hockey League in 1973–74. Following his playing career, Buetow was head coach at Minnesota, US International University, Colorado College, the Quad City Mallards, and the Waco Wizards.

== Career ==
Brad Buetow began attending the University of Minnesota in the fall of 1969 and started playing under head coach Glen Sonmor the following year. Buetow's playing career coincided with an unstable period in the program's history as Sonmor left in the middle of Buetow's Junior year and was replaced by Ken Yackel who lasted only the remainder of the season in his position before being succeeded by Herb Brooks. While at Minnesota, Buetow was also an All-American high jumper for the Minnesota Golden Gophers track and field team, finishing 5th at the 1971 NCAA Indoor Track and Field Championships.

Buetow tried to put the upheaval of his time at Minnesota behind him with a professional career when he signed on to play for the Cleveland Crusaders of the WHA, but he went scoreless in 25 games before finishing out the season with the AHL's Jacksonville Barons and hung up his skates when the season finished.

The next season Buetow returned to the Twin Cities to serve as an assistant under Herb Brooks who had taken the Golden Gophers to the first National title the year before. Under Brooks Buetow was part of two more national champion teams. When Brooks accepted the position of head coach/GM for Team USA at the 1980 Winter Olympics, Buetow stepped in as interim coach for the 1979–80 season. When his old boss opted not to return, Minnesota removed the interim tag from his title. Buetow was incredibly successful in Minnesota, providing three 30-win seasons and four NCAA tournament berths in six seasons, including two WCHA regular-season titles, two WCHA tournament titles and two Final Fours. His best team was the 1980-81 unit, which swept the WCHA regular season and tournament titles and advanced all the way to the 1981 national title game. However, Gopher fans had gotten used to winning national titles, and when Buetow was unable to deliver one, he was fired by his alma mater after the 1984–85 season.

Buetow moved west to take over at U.S. International which was set to begin play in the newly formed Great West Hockey Conference the next season. The Gulls won the first conference title, going 9–3 against the competition, but immediately the conference was in trouble when Northern Arizona dropped their program at the end of the year. U.S. International managed to hold on for the next two seasons but after 1987–88 both the conference and the school's Division I hockey program ceased to exist and Buetow was out of a job.

Fortunately a position at Colorado College opened up and Buetow stepped in to take over for Mike Bertsch. As with many coaches in CC's recent past Buetow had a difficult time getting the team to win games but managed to get the team its first non-losing season in over a decade in 1991–92 and received the WCHA Coach of the Year for his efforts. Unfortunately, he was forced to resign after the following season when an NCAA investigation revealed that Buetow had committed recruiting violations. While Buetow would continue to coach he would never again have a chance at an NCAA school.

== Career statistics ==
			Regular season					Playoffs
Season	Team	League	GP	G	A	Pts	PIM	GP	G	A	Pts	PIM
1970–71	Minnesota	NCAA	7	0	0	0	0	—	—	—	—	—
1971–72	Minnesota	NCAA	18	1	0	1	14	—	—	—	—	—
1972–73	Minnesota	NCAA	28	2	3	5	12	—	—	—	—	—
1973–74	Cleveland Crusaders	WHA	25	0	0	0	4	—	—	—	—	—
1973–74	Jacksonville Barons	AHL	37	9	10	19	69	—	—	—	—	—
WHA totals			25	0	0	0	4	—	—	—	—	—

== Head coaching record ==
Record table
Season	Team	Overall	Conference	Standing	Postseason
Minnesota Golden Gophers (WCHA) (1979–1985)
1979-80	Minnesota	26-15-0	18-14-0	2nd	NCAA Quarterfinal
1980-81	Minnesota	33-12-0	20-8-0	1st	NCAA runner-up
1981-82	Minnesota	22-12-2	13-11-2	3rd	WCHA Semifinals
1982-83	Minnesota	32-12-1	18-7-1	1st	NCAA consolation game (loss)
1983-84	Minnesota	27-11-2	16-9-1	3rd	WCHA Semifinals
1984-85	Minnesota	31-13-3	21-10-3	2nd	NCAA Quarterfinals
Minnesota:		171-75-8	106-59-7		
US International Gulls (Great West) (1985–1988)
1985-86	US International	20-13-0	9-3-0	1st	
1986-87	US International	17-17-1	7-8-1	2nd	
1987-88	US International	23-13-0	4-4-0	2nd	
US International:		60-43-0	20-15-0		
Colorado College Tigers (WCHA) (1988–1993)
1988-89	Colorado College	11-26-3	9-23-3	8th	WCHA first round
1989-90	Colorado College	18-20-2	10-17-1	7th	WCHA first round
1990-91	Colorado College	13-26-1	9-22-1	8th	WCHA first round
1991-92	Colorado College	18-18-5	14-14-4	4th	WCHA third-place game (loss)
1992-93	Colorado College	8-28-0	6-26-0	9th	WCHA first round
Colorado College:		68-118-11	48-102-9		
Total:		299-236-19			
National champion Postseason invitational champion Conference regular season champion Conference regular season and conference tournament champion Division regular season champion Division regular season and conference tournament champion Conference tournament champion

Awards and achievements
Preceded by John Gasparini; Rick Comley	WCHA Coach of the Year; 1979–80; 1991–92	Succeeded by John Giordano; Mike Sertich
