= Pacific Collegiate Hockey Association =

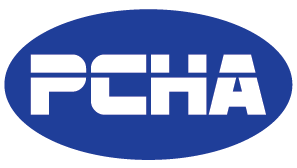
- Formerly: Southern California Collegiate Hockey Association (SCCHA)
- Conference: ACHA
- Founded: 1972
- Folded: 2020
- Sports fielded: Men's ice hockey
- Division: Division II
- No. of teams: 4
- Region: West
- Last champions: Santa Rosa (5th title)
- Most titles: Santa Rosa, San Jose State, & College of the Canyons (5 titles each)

The Pacific Collegiate Hockey Association (PCHA) was a collegiate hockey conference within Division 2 of the ACHA. The PCHA was in operation for more than 40 years and administered the PCHA Playoffs at the conclusion of each regular season. The winner of the PCHA Playoffs received the coveted Adams Cup, named after Cary Adams who started the conference.

== History ==
The PCHA, originally named the Southern California Collegiate Hockey Association, began in 1972. The three charter schools were Cal State Northridge, UCLA and Caltech.

In 2008 San Diego State became the first PCHA team to advance to the ACHA Division 3 National Championship Game but lost to California University (PA). In 2011 College of the Canyons became the first PCHA team to win the national championship by defeating Hope College 5–3.

The PCHA competed in Division 2 of the ACHA since the 2016-17 season until the conference's closure following the 2019-20 season.

== Members ==
School	Location	Founded	Joined	Affiliation	Nickname	Colors	Website
Santa Clara University	Santa Clara, CA	1851	2016	Private (Roman Catholic)	Broncos		
Santa Rosa Junior College	Santa Rosa, CA	1918	2012	Community College	Polar Bears		
UC Davis	Davis, CA	1905	2012	Public (University of California System)	Aggies		
UC Santa Cruz	Santa Cruz, CA	1965	2016	Public (University of California System)	Banana Slugs		

== Former members ==
School	Current Division (Conference)
California	ACHA D-2 (PAC-8)
Cal Lutheran	ACHA D-2 (WCHC)
Cal State Fullerton	ACHA D-2 (WCHC)
Cal State Northridge	ACHA D-2 (WCHC)
Caltech	
College of the Canyons	
Fresno State	ACHA D-2 (Independent)
LA Valley College	
Long Beach State	ACHA D-2 (WCHC)
Moorpark College	
Northern Arizona	ACHA D-2 & D-3 (Independent)
Orange Coast College	
Pierce College	
Pepperdine	
Sacramento State	
San Diego State	ACHA D-2 (PAC-8)
San Francisco State	
San Jose State	ACHA D-2 (PAC-8)
Stanford	ACHA D-2 (PAC-8)
UC Irvine	ACHA D-2 (WCHC)
UCLA	ACHA D-2 (PAC-8)
UC San Diego	ACHA D-2 (Independent)
UC Santa Barbara	ACHA D-2 (WCHC)
University of Redlands	
USC	ACHA D-2 (PAC-8)
West LA College	

== Adams Cup Champions ==
When the PCHA was split into two divisions the Division 1 champion was awarded the Adams Cup named after founder Cary Adams. The Division 2 champion was awarded the Warden Cup named after former president Doc Warden. In the modern era the PCHA champion is awarded the Adams Cup.

Year	Division 1 Champion	Runner up	Division 2 Champion	Host Team/City
2020	Santa Rosa JC	Santa Clara	-	Oakland
2019	Santa Clara	UC Davis	-	Oakland
2018	UC Santa Barbara	Santa Clara	-	South Lake Tahoe
2017	San Jose State (Non-member)	Santa Clara	-	South Lake Tahoe
2016	Santa Rosa JC	UC Davis	-	Santa Rosa JC
2015	Santa Rosa JC	UC Davis	-	South Lake Tahoe
2014	Santa Rosa JC	Santa Clara	-	UC Davis
2013	Santa Rosa JC	UC Davis	-	South Lake Tahoe
2012	College of the Canyons	Cal State Northridge	-	Bakersfield
2011	College of the Canyons	Cal State Northridge	-	Fresno State
2010	College of the Canyons	Cal State Northridge	-	South Lake Tahoe
2009	College of the Canyons	Northern Arizona	-	Fresno State
2008	San Diego State	Cal State Northridge	-	Bakersfield
2007	San Diego State	Northern Arizona	-	Northern Arizona
2006	UC San Diego	Santa Rosa JC	-	CSUN
2005	Moorpark College	Santa Rosa JC	-	Fresno State
2004	College of the Canyons	UC Davis	-	South Lake Tahoe
2003	Fresno State	College of the Canyons	-	San Diego
2002	UC San Diego		-	
2001	UC San Diego		-	
2000	UC San Diego		-	
1999	Cal State Northridge		-	
1998	San Diego State		-	
1997	San Jose State		-	
1996	Orange Coast College		Fresno State	
1995	San Jose State		-	
1994	San Jose State		-	
1993	San Jose State		Orange Coast College	
1992	Stanford		San Jose State	
1991	UCLA		Caltech	
1990	Pepperdine		Caltech	
1989	UCLA		Pepperdine	
1988	Cal State Fullerton		Caltech	
1987	Cal State Fullerton		USC	
1986	Cal State Fullerton		USC	
1985	Cal State Fullerton		UC Irvine	
1984	USC		Caltech	
1983	Pierce College		Pierce College Team 2	
1982	Cal State Northridge		Cal State Fullerton	
1981	Cal State Northridge		Long Beach State	
1980	USC		LA Valley College	
1979	USC		LA Valley College	
1978	LA Valley College		Caltech	
1977	Cal State Northridge		Pierce College	
1976	USC		USC Team 2	
1975	-		USC	
1974	-		Caltech	
1973	-		Caltech	

Division 1 Championship Totals

Team	Titles	Years
Santa Rosa Junior College	5	2013, 2014, 2015, 2016, 2020
San Jose State	5	1993, 1994, 1995, 1997, 2017
College of the Canyons	5	2004, 2009, 2010, 2011, 2012
UC San Diego	4	2000, 2001, 2002, 2006
USC	4	1976, 1979, 1980, 1984
Cal State Northridge	4	1977, 1981, 1982, 1999
Cal State Fullerton	4	1985, 1986, 1987, 1988
San Diego State	3	1998, 2007, 2008
UCLA	2	1989, 1991
Santa Clara	1	2019
UC Santa Barbara	1	2018
Moorpark College	1	2005
Fresno State	1	2003
Orange Coast College	1	1996
Stanford	1	1992
Pepperdine	1	1990
Pierce College	1	1983
LA Valley College	1	1978

== ACHA Division 3 Nationals Teams ==
From 2002-2012 the PCHA sent 17 teams to the ACHA Division 3 National Tournament.

2012 Host City: Vineland, NJ

- College of the Canyons (Finished 7th)

Davenport (L 8-2)

Robert Morris (W 9-6)

Central Florida (W 7-6 OT)

- Cal State Northridge (Finished 9th)

Hope College (T 5-5)

California (PA) (L 8-6)

Alabama (W 7-6 OT)

2011 Host City: Holland, MI

- College of the Canyons (National Champion)

Fredonia State (W 4-3)

Loyola-Maryland (W 5-4)

Saginaw Valley State (W 4-1)

California (PA) (W 2-1 OT)

National Championship Game- Hope College (W 5-3)

2010 Host City: Fort Myers, FL

- College of the Canyons (Finished 5th)

Florida (W 8-3)

Robert Morris (W 7-4)

Saginaw Valley State (L 4-1)

- Cal State Northridge (Finished 11th)

Central Florida (L 7-4)

California (PA) (L 9-2)

Lansing Community College (W 8-6)

2009 Host City: Rochester, NY

- Northern Arizona (Finished 6th)

Penn State-Brandywine (W 5-1)

Saginaw Valley State (L 7-2)

College of the Canyons (W 11-3)

Dordt College (L 2-1 SO)

- College of the Canyons (Finished 14th)

Albany (W 6-5)

Grand Valley State (L 7-2)

Northern Arizona (L 11-3)

Georgia Tech (L 9-7)

2008 Host City: Rochester, MN

- San Diego State (National Runner-Up)

Tennessee (W 5-3)

Hope College (W 6-1)

Central Florida (W 6-1)

National Championship Game- California (PA) (L 7-3)

- Northern Arizona (Finished 6th)

Northwood (W 4-3)

California (PA) (L 7-3)

Farmingdale State (W 5-4)

Hope College (L 4-3)

2007 Host City: Fort Wayne, IN

- Northern Arizona (Finished 8th)

Tennessee (W 9-5)

Albany (L 3-2)

Northern Colorado (L 8-3)

Indiana (PA) (L 3-2)

- College of the Canyons (Finished 10th)

Kennesaw State (L 12-3)

California (PA) (W 11-5)

San Diego State (W 6-5)

Wright State (L 12-4)

- San Diego State (Finished 12th)

Indiana (PA) (L 6-4)

Central Florida (W 3-2)

College of the Canyons (L 6-5)

Penn State-Berks (L 3-1)

2006 Host City: Fort Myers, FL

- College of the Canyons (Finished 12th)

Wright State (L 6-1)

Indiana (PA) (W 5-4 SO)

Central Florida (L 12-1)

Pittsburgh-Johnstown (L 9-2)

2005 Host School: California (PA)

- Fresno State (Finished 6th)

St. Vincent (W 9-4)

Penn State-Berks (L 7-3)

California (PA) (W 7-2)

Wright State (L 8-2)

2004 Host School: Arizona State

- West Los Angeles College (Finished 9th)

Indiana (PA) (L 1-0)

Florida Gulf Coast (W 9-4)

Radford (W 16-1)

Georgia Tech (W 9-2)

2003 Host School: Muskegon Community College

- College of the Canyons (Finished 5th)

Wagner College (W 3-2)

Hope College (L 1-0)

Tennessee (W 9-7)

Georgetown (W 5-4)

2002 Host School: Georgia Tech

- UC San Diego (Finished 8th)

Georgia (W 4-3)

Muskegon Community College (L 5-3)

Slippery Rock (L 3-2)
