= United Collegiate Hockey Cup =

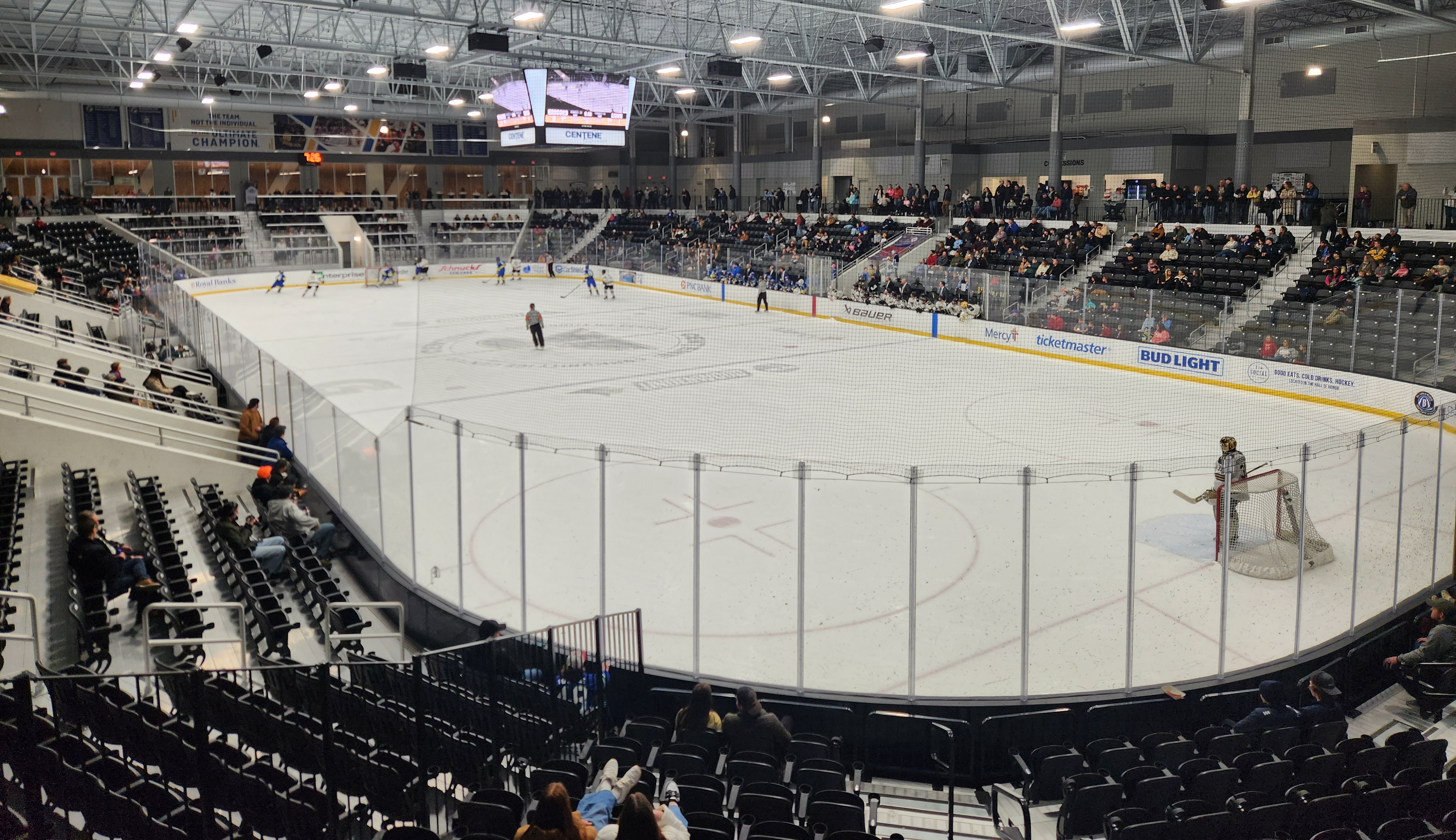
- The Centene Community Ice Center in Maryland Heights, MO, will host the inaugural UCHC tournament in 2026.
- Sport: College ice hockey
- Conference: Independent teams
- Number of teams: 5
- Format: Single-elimination
- Current stadium: Centene Community Ice Center
- Current location: Maryland Heights, Missouri
- Played: 2026 – present
- Last contest: 2026
- Current champion: Alaska (1st win)
- Most championships: Alaska (1 win)
- Winner trophy: United Collegiate Hockey Cup (trophy)
- TV partner: FloHockey

The United Collegiate Hockey Cup is an end-of-season tournament for the independent teams playing NCAA Division I college ice hockey. As the participants in the tournament are not part of any conference, this tournament effectively acts as a de facto conference tournament for the independent teams, though it does not guarantee a bid into the NCAA Division I men's ice hockey tournament. The tournament was created to give the independent Division I teams something to play for at the end of the season, and with the addition of a loser's bracket, guarantees at least two games for all teams.

== History ==
Beginning in late 2024, the five independent college hockey teams, Lindenwood, Alaska, Alaska Anchorage, LIU, and Stonehill, began talks about creating an end-of-season tournament so that they would have something to play for at the end of the season while all other teams were participating in their conference tournaments. While not a formation of an official conference, the schools noted at the time that participation in the tournament may eventually lead to the creation of a new conference of independent teams.

On May 5, 2025, Lindenwood announced that they would be hosting the first iteration of the United Collegiate Hockey Cup at their home rink, the Centene Community Ice Center in March 2026. The event would take place over the course of three days and allow all five independent teams a chance to play at least two games. Stonehill Athletic Director Dean O'Keefe stated the importance of the event and how every team deserves a chance to compete for a championship, and that this tournament would allow the independent schools to do so. Multiple athletic directors celebrated the event as the inaugural postseason championship for the independent schools.

By virtue of having the highest NPI ranking of the five schools, Alaska was awarded the #1 seed at the inaugural tournament on March 5-7, 2026. Following a thrilling goal at the 19:59 mark of the 3rd period in the semifinals, Alaska went to the championship game, where they won 4-3 in overtime over Lindenwood.

== Tournament results ==
Year	Winning team	Coach	Losing team	Coach	Score	Location	Finals venue
2026	Alaska	Erik Largen	Lindenwood	Keith Fisher	4–3 (OT)	Maryland Heights, Missouri	Centene Community Ice Center

== Championship Appearances ==
=== By school ===
School	Championships	Appearances	Pct.
Alaska	1	1	1.000
Lindenwood	0	1	.000

=== By coach ===
Coach	Championships	Appearances	Pct.
Erik Largen	1	1	1.000
Keith Fisher	0	1	.000
