= Jay Lively Activity Center =

Ice arena in Flagstaff, Arizona

Coordinates: 35.214285°N 111.638240°W

- "The Jay"
- Interactive map of Jay Lively Activity Center
- Former names: Flagstaff Ice Arena
- Address: 1650 North Turquoise Drive Flagstaff, AZ 86001

Construction
- Opened: 1971
- Renovated: 2010

Tenant
- Northern Arizona Lumberjacks (ACHA) (1971–1977, 1991–present)

Jay Lively Activity Center is an ice arena and skating center in Flagstaff, Arizona. It is home to the Northern Arizona Lumberjacks men's ice hockey team.

== Naming ==
Jay Lively Activity Center is named in honor of local ice hockey player Jay Lively who died in a car crash.

== History ==
Jay Lively Activity Center opened in 1971 under the name "Flagstaff Ice Arena" until 1985 when the name was changed to honor Jay Lively.

In 1977 NAU left the arena to play NCAA D-I ice hockey inside the new Walkup Skydome but returned in 1985 after NAU dropped support for the hockey program due to the ice system in the Skydome falling into disrepair.

In 2010 the roof collapsed due to snow buildup after a four-day blizzard.
