= Pat Mayer =

American ice hockey player (born 1961)

- Born: July 24, 1961 (age 64) Royal Oak, Michigan, U.S.
- Height: 6 ft 3 in (191 cm)
- Weight: 225 lb (102 kg; 16 st 1 lb)
- Position: Defense
- Shot: Left
- Played for: Pittsburgh Penguins
- NHL draft: Undrafted
- Playing career: 1985–1989

Pat Mayer (born July 24, 1961) is an American former professional ice hockey player who played one game in the National Hockey League (NHL) with the Pittsburgh Penguins during the 1987–88 season.

== Career ==
Born in Royal Oak, Michigan, Mayer played an abrasive physical game and doled out many a punishing hit in college and the minors. He spent three years at the United States International University in San Diego, California. Undrafted by an NHL club, he agreed to turn pro with the IHL's Toledo Goaldiggers in 1985–86. Before the end of the season, he was traded to the Muskegon Lumberjacks where he remained another year.

The burly rearguard signed with Pittsburgh in July, 1987 and made it into one NHL game on March 20, 1988 against the Philadelphia Flyers. Mayer returned to the IHL for the balance of the schedule and led the league with 450 penalty minutes. Mayer retired in 1989 after playing most of the year in Muskegon. A late season trade to the Los Angeles Kings resulted in him spending the last month of his pro career with the AHL's New Haven Nighthawks.

== Career statistics ==
=== Regular season and playoffs ===
			Regular season					Playoffs
Season	Team	League	GP	G	A	Pts	PIM	GP	G	A	Pts	PIM
1979–80	Quebec Remparts	QMJHL	3	0	0	0	7	—	—	—	—	—
1979–80	Redford Royals	GLJHL	37	3	26	29	132	—	—	—	—	—
1982–83	United States International University	NCAA	30	3	6	6	68	—	—	—	—	—
1983–84	United States International University	NCAA	35	1	15	16	89	—	—	—	—	—
1984–85	United States International University	NCAA	28	3	14	17	94	—	—	—	—	—
1985–86	Toledo Goaldiggers	IHL	61	1	13	14	216	—	—	—	—	—
1985–86	Muskegon Lumberjacks	IHL	13	1	2	3	17	13	0	2	2	37
1986–87	Muskegon Lumberjacks	IHL	71	4	14	18	387	13	1	0	1	53
1987–88	Pittsburgh Penguins	NHL	1	0	0	0	4	—	—	—	—	—
1987–88	Muskegon Lumberjacks	IHL	73	3	10	13	450	5	0	0	0	47
1988–89	Muskegon Lumberjacks	IHL	56	0	13	13	314	—	—	—	—	—
1988–89	New Haven Nighthawks	AHL	6	0	0	0	35	—	—	—	—	—
IHL totals			274	9	52	61	1384	31	1	2	3	137
NHL totals			1	0	0	0	4	—	—	—	—	—

== See also ==
- List of players who played only one game in the NHL
