= United States International University =

Noprofit university in California (1924–2001)

- Former names: Balboa Law College; Balboa University; California Western University
- Active: 1924–2001
- Founder: Leland Ghent Stanford
- Accreditation: Western Association of Schools and Colleges
- Location: Scripps Ranch, San Diego, California, U.S.
- Campus: Multiple sites including: San Diego, Maui, Steamboat Springs, Wiesbaden, Vienna, Hong Kong, London, Mexico City and Nairobi (USIU Africa)
- Merged into: Alliant International University
- Sporting affiliations: NCAA Division I NAIA
- Website: www.usiu.edu (archived copy as of 2000)

United States International University (USIU) was a nonprofit university based in San Diego, California, that was accredited by the Western Association of Schools and Colleges. At its peak, it had two additional American campuses and three international locations. It was merged into Alliant International University in 2001, which became a for-profit benefit corporation in 2015.

== History ==
USIU's roots date back to Balboa Law College, which was founded in 1924 in downtown San Diego by Leland Ghent Stanford. It was San Diego's first law school. The college gradually added other courses of study and changed its name to Balboa University. In 1952 it changed its name to California Western University and moved to a historic oceanfront campus in San Diego's Point Loma neighborhood. William C. Rust became its president in 1953.

In 1966, Rust began transforming the university's vision "to create global understanding through a single university with campuses all over the world." In 1968 he changed the school's name to United States International University, whose founding goal was to focus on "human excellence" and not simply "intellectual excellence". The San Diego Reader later referred to USIU as an "international phenomenon". Rust purchased land for a new campus in Scripps Ranch, and all university operations were moved there by 1973. California Western School of Law kept its separate name and identity and remained on the Point Loma campus until 1973, when it moved to downtown San Diego. In 1975 it split off from USIU into an independent entity that is still in operation.

In the early 1980s, USIU held a broadcast license to operate KUSI-TV, a startup UHF television station in San Diego. To launch the station, USIU partnered with Mike McKinnon, who owned television stations in Texas and KSON radio in San Diego. It went on in 1982; after a protracted dispute, USIU sold its stake to McKinnon, who had blocked attempts to sell to other parties. KUSI still exists as an independent station, but is now owned by Nexstar Media Group.

USIU undertook a program of international expansion, but was soon plagued by financial trouble due to aggressive and far reaching expansion of "international centers" in Wiesbaden, Vienna, and Hong Kong coupled with bankruptcy litigation of the University's largest financier, US Financial Securities Corporation. In 1986, Rust was still breaking new ground for buildings and maintaining focus on further expansion in Latin America, the Middle East, Europe and Russia.

After 37 years of leading the university and enduring several rocky financial episodes, Rust was removed from all governing power by the board of trustees in 1990. Gary Hays, former chancellor of the Minnesota State University, took over as president of USIU in April 1990 and reorganized the University into just two remaining colleges; arts and sciences and business administration. All sports programs were eliminated due to the University's indebtedness.

The university was able to continue and restored smaller athletic programs for soccer, tennis and cross country competing in the NAIA. However, the September 11 attacks and subsequent loss of international student enrollment tuition proved to be final for USIU. In 2001, it merged with the California School of Professional Psychology to form Alliant International University. Both CSPP and USIU were not-for-profit schools with similar needs and complementing resources. At the time of their merger the newly formed AIU had an undergraduate student body that was 33% international students and 30% ethnic minority group students and an annual budget of $60 million. In 2015, Alliant International University became a for-profit benefit corporation.

== International focus ==
The university's main campus from 1952 to 1973 was the land that is now occupied by Point Loma Nazarene University. With the name change to USIU the university moved to its new campus in Scripps Ranch, and opened national campuses in Maui and Steamboat Springs as well as international campuses in London, Mexico City, and Nairobi. Additional campuses were proposed. The Nairobi campus is the only one that still exists and is now known as United States International University Africa. The multi-campus, international concept shaped the university with its student focus and core curriculum. In the late 1980s USIU became known for catering to wealthy international students, including royalty from the Middle East.

== Athletics ==
The USIU Gulls football team produced five professional football players. The legendary Sid Gillman was head coach for four months during an offseason before his final coaching job with the Philadelphia Eagles. In just four months, "Gillman turned the team into a West Coast legend". In an interview with Sports Illustrated, Al Palmiotto, USIU's athletic director during Gillman's time, recalled that Gillman said, "What a lucky son-of-a-bitch I am finding a place like this for the last years of my life." Four of the coaches he recruited all went on to have extensive careers in the NFL: Tom Walsh, John Fox, Mike Solari and Mike Sheppard. Two players he recruited became NFL starters: Bob Gagliano and Vernon Dean.

USIU's international presence and student body allowed it to maintain an NCAA Division I hockey team, the USIU Gulls, which was the only NCAA hockey team west of the Rockies. In 1980, Sports Illustrated covered the team's triumphs with a 16-8-2 record in article titled "Beach Boys on Blades". However, in 1990 after operating for 10 years and producing two NHL Pittsburgh Penguins players — Darren Lowe and Pat Mayer — the program was dropped due to the rising costs associated with "traveling 2,000 miles to compete".

USIU also maintained a non-conference NCAA Division I basketball team which has been referred to as the "greatest show in college basketball" and the "forgotten team of San Diego". When playing for the USIU Gulls, Kevin Bradshaw recorded an NCAA record for the most points in a single game versus an NCAA Division I team (72 in a loss to Loyola Marymount).

USIU's women's basketball team was also a member of NCAA Division I between 1981 and 1989, although the team mainly competed as an independent the Gulls were members of the West Coast Conference in the 1985–86 and 1986–87 seasons. The Gulls won the 1986 WCAC regular season championship in women's basketball finishing the season with an 11–1 record

USIU's softball team appeared in one Women's College World Series in 1982. The Gulls defeated Ohio State 1–0 in the team's first game. Freshman pitcher Jenny Stallard then hurled an eight-inning perfect game to stun top-seeded and eventual tournament champion, Texas A&M, 1–0 in the team's second game. However, losses to Michigan and Central Michigan ended the Gulls' season.

== Notable people ==
Notable faculty included Jamie Foxx, Lem Burnham, and Igor Ansoff, the "father of Strategic Management".

=== Alumni ===
- Sergio Albert, NFL player
- Barry Bostwick, Tony- and Golden Globe-winning actor
- Kevin Bradshaw, NCAA basketball record-holder for points in a single game, player in the Israeli Basketball Premier League
- Lem Burnham, NFL player
- Wayne Clark, NFL player
- Vernon Dean, NFL player
- Jamie Foxx, actor, singer, comedian, writer, record producer, and rapper
- Ken Friedman, co-founder of the Fluxus art movement
- Bob Gagliano, NFL player
- Dwight McDonald, NFL player
