= Doc DelCastillo =

American ice hockey player and coach

Current position
- Title: Head coach
- Team: Vermont Lumberjacks

Biographical details
- Born: August 25, 1968 (age 58); Saint Paul, MN, USA

Playing career
- 1990–1992: St. Cloud State
- Position: Forward

Coaching career (HC unless noted)
- 1992–1993: Waterloo Blackhawks (assistant)
- 1993–1995: Omaha Lancers (assistant)
- 1994–1997: Rochester Mustangs
- 1997–1998: Omaha Lancers (assistant)
- 2000–2002: St. Cloud State (assistant)
- 2002–2007: Nebraska-Omaha (assistant)
- 2007–2008: Alaska
- 2009–2012: Alexandria Blizzard
- 2012–2014: Hamline
- 2014–2018: Vermont Lumberjacks
- 2018–Present: Willmar WarHawks

Head coaching record
- Overall: 3-76-6 (.071)

Doc DelCastillo is an American ice hockey coach. He has coached at varying levels of amateur and professional ice hockey as both an assistant and head coach, most recently for Hamline University.

== Career statistics ==
			Regular season					Playoffs
Season	Team	League	GP	G	A	Pts	PIM	GP	G	A	Pts	PIM
1990–91	St. Cloud State	NCAA	38	3	11	14	2	—	—	—	—	—
1991–92	St. Cloud State	NCAA	31	4	11	15	0	—	—	—	—	—
NCAA totals			69	7	22	29	2	—	—	—	—	—

== Head coaching record ==
Record table
Season	Team	Overall	Conference	Standing	Postseason
Alaska Nanooks (CCHA) (2007–2008)
2007–08	Alaska	0-35-0†	0-28-0†	9th	CCHA First Round
Alaska:		0-35-0	0-28-0		
Hamline Pipers (MIAC) (2012–2014)
2012–13	Hamline	1-19-5			
2013–14	Hamline	2-22-1			
Hamline:		3-41-6			
Total:		3-76-6			
National champion Postseason invitational champion Conference regular season champion Conference regular season and conference tournament champion Division regular season champion Division regular season and conference tournament champion Conference tournament champion

†Alaska was retroactively forced to forfeit all wins and ties due to player ineligibilities.
