= West Coast Hockey Conference =

- League: ACHA
- Founded: 2010
- Sports fielded: Men's ice hockey
- Divisions: 2 & 3
- No. of teams: 21
- Region: West
- Most recent champion: New Mexico (1st title)
- Most titles: CSUN / NAU (4)
- Website: Official website

The West Coast Hockey Conference (WCHC) is an ACHA Division 2 and 3 club hockey league which began play in the Fall of 2010. The six charter schools were Arizona State, Cal State Fullerton, Long Beach State, Loyola Marymount, Northern Arizona and San Diego State.

== History ==
The first game in conference history was played on October 1, 2010. San Diego State hosted Long Beach State and won 4-3. At the end of the regular season Arizona State was crowned the conference's first champion. For the conference's second season and beyond a playoff will be held to determine the conference champion.

UNLV became the seventh member of the conference on April 16, 2011.

After the 2011-12 season Arizona State, San Diego State and UNLV became independent once again leaving the conference with four teams for the next two seasons.

Cal State Northridge became the fifth member of the conference on February 25, 2014.

Northern Arizona left to become independent once again after the 2014-15 season and Arizona State's Pac-8 team transferred over to keep the conference membership at five.

Arizona State left to become independent after one season and San Diego State rejoined the conference for 2016-17.

Chapman became the sixth conference member for the 2017-18 season.

The WCHC announced on May 14, 2018 UC San Diego, UC Santa Barbara and the University of San Diego were approved as members and San Diego State left to join the Pac-8 conference bringing the conference total to eight.

The conference reached a new high in members with the addition of Cal State Bakersfield and UC Irvine for the 2019-20 season. In an effort to even out the skill level two tiers were created. Cal State Fullerton, Cal State Northridge, Long Beach State, Loyola Marymount and UC Santa Barbara were placed in the top tier with the remaining five teams placed in the second tier. All top tier teams automatically qualified for the playoffs and the top two teams in the second tier qualified as well.

Cal Lutheran became a new member for the 2020-21 season while UC San Diego left the conference. CLU replaced UCSD in Tier II keeping total membership at ten.

After the 2021-22 season the WCHC expanded even further with Arizona State and Northern Arizona rejoining the conference and Grand Canyon, Santa Clara, Santa Rosa Junior College, UC Davis, UCLA and UC Santa Cruz becoming new members. San Diego also left which brought membership to a record 17 schools. With so many new schools the WCHC was divided into three tiers. Tier I consisted of six teams Arizona State, Grand Canyon, Long Beach State, Loyola Marymount, Northern Arizona and UCLA. Tier II South consisted of seven teams Cal Lutheran, Cal State Bakersfield, Cal State Fullerton, Cal State Northridge, Chapman, UC Irvine and UC Santa Barbara. Tier II North consisted of four teams Santa Clara, Santa Rosa Junior College, UC Davis and UC Santa Cruz.

Fresno State joined for the 2023-24 season in Tier II North while Santa Rosa Junior College is not fielding a team.

Three teams joined for the 2024-25 season while Fresno State left the conference. The University of San Diego brought their team back while the University of New Mexico and Park University-Gilbert became two new teams to join the conference. The WCHC also allowed Arizona State, Grand Canyon, Loyola Marymount and Northern Arizona to bring their Division 3 teams into the conference. The new Division 2 Tier will consist of nine teams Arizona State, Cal State Fullerton, Cal State Northridge, Grand Canyon, Loyola Marymount, New Mexico, Northern Arizona, UCLA and UC Santa Barbara. The top eight teams will qualify for the playoffs. The Division 3 Tier will consist of 12 teams split into three regions. Santa Clara, UC Davis and UC Santa Cruz will play in the North. Cal Lutheran, Long Beach State, Loyola Marymount, San Diego and UC Irvine will play in the South. Arizona State, Grand Canyon, Northern Arizona and Park-Gilbert will play in the Desert. Again the top eight teams will qualify for the playoffs.

== Members ==
School	Location	Founded	Joined	Affiliation	Nickname	Colors	Website
Arizona State	Tempe, AZ	1885	2022	Public	Sun Devils		
California Lutheran University	Thousand Oaks, CA	1959	2020	Private	Kingsmen		
Cal State Fullerton	Fullerton, CA	1957	2010	Public (CSU System)	Titans		
Cal State Northridge	Northridge, CA	1958	2014	Public (CSU System)	Matadors		
Grand Canyon University	Phoenix, AZ	1949	2022	Private	Antelopes		
Long Beach State	Long Beach, CA	1949	2010	Public (CSU System)	The Beach		
Loyola Marymount University	Los Angeles, CA	1911	2010	Private	Lions		
University of New Mexico	Albuquerque, NM	1889	2024	Public	Lobos		
Northern Arizona University	Flagstaff, AZ	1899	2022	Public	Ice Jacks		
Park University-Gilbert	Gilbert, AZ	2018	2024	Private	Buccaneers		
University of San Diego	San Diego, CA	1949	2024	Private	Toreros		
Santa Clara University	Santa Clara, CA	1851	2022	Private	Broncos		
UC Davis	Davis, CA	1905	2022	Public (UC System)	Aggies		
UC Irvine	Irvine, CA	1965	2019	Public (UC System)	Anteaters		
UCLA	Los Angeles, CA	1919	2022	Public (UC System)	Bruins		
UC Santa Barbara	Santa Barbara, CA	1891	2018	Public (UC System)	Gauchos		
UC Santa Cruz	Santa Cruz, CA	1965	2022	Public (UC System)	Banana Slugs		

== Former members ==
School	Current Division (Conference)
Cal State Bakersfield	No longer have a program
Chapman	ACHA D-2 (Independent)
Fresno State	ACHA D-2 (Independent)
San Diego State	ACHA D-1 (Independent)
Santa Rosa Junior College	ACHA D-2 (Independent)
UC San Diego	ACHA D-2 (Independent)
UNLV	ACHA D-1 (WCHL)

== Team histories ==
- Cal Lutheran started their program in the mid-1980s and played in the Pacific Collegiate Hockey Association until disbanding in the mid-1990s. CLU re-established their program in 2013.
- Cal State Fullerton also previously played in the PCHA until disbanding in 2005. The Titans re-established their program for the 2008-09 season, played that year in Division 3 and then moved up to Division 2 for the 2009-10 season.
- Cal State Northridge founded the PCHA in 1972 along with UCLA and Caltech. The Matadors moved up to Division 2 for the 2012-13 season after making the Division 3 National Tournament in 2010 and 2012.
- Long Beach State also previously played in the PCHA. In the late 1990s The Beach moved up to Division 2.
- Loyola Marymount originally had a team from 1930 to 1942. The Lions re-established their program in 2006.
- UC Irvine also previously played in the PCHA until disbanding in 2010. The Anteaters re-established their program for the 2019-20 season.
- UC Santa Barbara started their program in 2010. The Gauchos also previously played in the PCHA.

== Tournament champions ==
Year	Champion	Runner-up	Host
2026	New Mexico	Arizona State	UCLA
2025	Grand Canyon	Arizona State	UCLA
2024	Northern Arizona	UCLA	UCLA
2023	Grand Canyon	UCLA	UCLA
2022	Loyola Marymount (Regular season)	-	-
2021	Not played due to the COVID-19 Pandemic		CSU Bakersfield
2020	Cal State Northridge	Loyola Marymount	Chapman
2019	Cal State Northridge	Long Beach State	Cal State Fullerton
2018	Cal State Northridge	Long Beach State	Loyola Marymount
2017	Cal State Northridge	San Diego State	Cal State Northridge
2016	Arizona State-Maroon	Cal State Northridge	Loyola Marymount
2015	Northern Arizona	Cal State Fullerton	Northern Arizona
2014	Northern Arizona	Long Beach State	Long Beach State
2013	Northern Arizona	Loyola Marymount	Cal State Fullerton
2012	UNLV	Northern Arizona	UNLV
2011	Arizona State (Regular Season)	-	-

Note: 2022 tournament cancelled

== ACHA Division 2 Nationals teams ==
The WCHC has sent five teams to the Division 2 National Tournament.

2016 Host City: West Chester, PA

- Arizona State-Maroon

Liberty (L 4-1)

William Paterson (L 5-1)

Lindenwood (L 9-1)

2015 Host City: Salt Lake City, UT

- Northern Arizona

NYU (L 3-1)

Liberty (W 5-2)

Grand Valley State (L 7-2)

2014 Host City: Marlborough, MA

- Northern Arizona (Finished 9th)

New Hampshire (L 3-1)

Liberty (L 6-2)

Grand Valley State (W 6-2)

2012 Host City: Fort Myers, FL

- Arizona State (Finished 5th)

New Hampshire (W 7-1)

Maryland-Baltimore County (W 5-4 OT)

Michigan State (T 2-2)

- Northern Arizona (Finished 16th)

Grand Valley State (L 8-2)

Penn State (L 9-0)

Siena College (L 3-1)

== See also ==
- American Collegiate Hockey Association
- List of ice hockey leagues
