= Tavis MacMillan =

Canadian ice hockey player and coach

Current position
- Title: Assistant Coach
- Team: Denver Pioneers

Biographical details
- Born: September 9, 1970 (age 56); Milk River, Alberta, Canada

Playing career
- 1990–1994: Alaska-Fairbanks
- 1994–1995: Greensboro Monarchs
- 1995–1996: Alaska Gold Kings
- Position: Center

Coaching career (HC unless noted)
- 1995–1996: Alaska Gold Kings (assistant GM)
- 1996–2003: Alaska-Fairbanks (assistant)
- 2004–2007: Alaska
- 2007–2011: Atlanta Thrashers (scout)
- 2011–2015: Winnipeg Jets (scout)
- 2015–present: Denver Pioneers (assistant)

Head coaching record
- Overall: 46-54-15 (.465)

Tavis MacMillan (born September 9, 1970) is a Canadian former professional ice hockey player and coach. He has previously served as both assistant and head coach for Alaska after having played for the Nanooks for four seasons. In 2026, he became the first general manager of the Denver Pioneers men's ice hockey team.

== Career statistics ==
| | | | Regular season | | | | | Playoffs |
| Season | Team | League | GP | G | A | Pts | PIM | GP | G | A | Pts | PIM |
|---|---|---|---|---|---|---|---|---|---|---|---|---|
| 1990–91 | Alaska-Fairbanks | NCAA | 34 | 10 | 16 | 26 | 29 | — | — | — | — | — |
| 1991–92 | Alaska-Fairbanks | NCAA | 27 | 7 | 28 | 35 | 52 | — | — | — | — | — |
| 1992–93 | Alaska-Fairbanks | NCAA | 36 | 16 | 41 | 57 | 88 | — | — | — | — | — |
| 1993–94 | Alaska-Fairbanks | NCAA | 38 | 23 | 51 | 74 | 66 | — | — | — | — | — |
| 1994–95 | Greensboro Monarchs | ECHL | 8 | 2 | 1 | 3 | 20 | — | — | — | — | — |
| 1995–96 | Alaska Gold Kings | WCHL | 55 | 40 | 46 | 86 | 91 | — | — | — | — | — |
| NCAA totals | | | 135 | 56 | 136 | 192 | 235 | — | — | — | — | — |

== Head coaching record ==
Record table
| Season | Team | Overall | Conference | Standing | Postseason |
|---|---|---|---|---|---|
Alaska–Fairbanks Nanooks (CCHA) (2004–2006)
| 2004-05 | Alaska–Fairbanks | 17-16-4 | 11-14-3 | 8th | CCHA third-place game (win) |
| 2005-06 | Alaska–Fairbanks | 18-16-5 | 11-13-4 | 9th | CCHA Quarterfinals |
| Alaska–Fairbanks: | | 35-32-9 | 22-27-7 | | |
Alaska Nanooks (CCHA) (2006–2007)
| 2006-07 | Alaska | 11-22-6 | 7-16-5 | 11th | CCHA Quarterfinals |
| Alaska: | | 11-22-6 | 7-16-5 | | |
| Total: | | 46-54-15 | | | |
National champion Postseason invitational champion Conference regular season champion Conference regular season and conference tournament champion Division regular season champion Division regular season and conference tournament champion Conference tournament champion

Awards and achievements
| Preceded by Paul Kariya | NCAA Ice Hockey Scoring Champion; 1993–94 (with Dean Fedorchuk) | Succeeded by Brendan Morrison |
