= Dave Laurion =

American ice hockey player and coach

Biographical details
- Born: April 26, 1960 (age 66); International Falls, MN, USA

Playing career
- 1978–1982: Notre Dame
- 1982–1983: Peoria Prancers
- Position: Goaltender

Coaching career (HC unless noted)
- 1988–1993: Alaska-Fairbanks (assistant)
- 1993–1999: Alaska-Fairbanks

Head coaching record
- Overall: 80-122-9 (.400)

Dave Laurion is a retired American ice hockey player and coach. He was on the coaching staff of Alaska-Fairbanks for over a decade, serving as both assistant and head coach for the varsity program.

== Head coaching record ==
Record table
Season	Team	Overall	Conference	Standing	Postseason
Alaska–Fairbanks Nanooks Independent (1993–1995)
1993-94	Alaska–Fairbanks	24-13-1			CCHA First Round
1994-95	Alaska–Fairbanks	11-21-1			CCHA Play-in Game
Alaska–Fairbanks:		35-34-2			
Alaska–Fairbanks Nanooks (CCHA) (1995–1999)
1995-96	Alaska–Fairbanks	10-23-1	8-22-0	t-9th	
1996-97	Alaska–Fairbanks	14-22-1	8-18-1	8th	CCHA Quarterfinals
1997-98	Alaska–Fairbanks	10-21-4	7-20-3	10th	
1998-99	Alaska–Fairbanks	11-22-1	8-21-1	11th	
Alaska–Fairbanks:		45-88-7	31-81-5		
Total:		80-122-9			
National champion Postseason invitational champion Conference regular season champion Conference regular season and conference tournament champion Division regular season champion Division regular season and conference tournament champion Conference tournament champion
