= Pacific 8 Intercollegiate Hockey Conference =

Collegiate club hockey conference

Pacific 8 Intercollegiate Hockey Conference (PAC-8)
- Current season, competition or edition: 2026-27
- Conference: ACHA
- Sport: Ice hockey
- Founded: 1995
- Commissioner: Travis Allen
- Sports fielded: Men's ice hockey
- Division: Division II
- No. of teams: 8
- Region: West
- Most recent champions: Washington (5th title)
- Most titles: USC (8 titles)
- Website: https://pac8hockey.net/

The Pacific 8 Intercollegiate Hockey Conference (PAC-8) is a collegiate men's ice hockey conference that competes in Division 2 of the American Collegiate Hockey Association.

The PAC-8 was originally only open to schools that belonged to the Pac-12 Conference; however, for the 2018-19 season, the league expanded to include other schools from outside that conference. These schools included Boise State, Eastern Washington, San Diego State, San Jose State, and Western Washington.

== Regular season format ==
According to the PAC-8 charter, each season starts on September 1 of each year.

Along with the required conference schedule, teams schedule non-conference games against ACHA opponents for regional and national ranking consideration.

For the 2024/2025 season, each team must play fourteen conference games. At the end of the season the top eight teams qualify for the playoffs.

In game play, the ACHA follows the NCAA Rulebook for ice hockey. For interconference games, the PAC-8 mostly follows the same rules for game times and structure. A notable difference is in cases of a tie game after regulation and a 3 on3 5-minute sudden-death overtime period. If a winner is not determined in overtime, then a 3 man shoot-out will occur. During the Conference Championship tournament, overtime format is 20 minute sudden-death periods until a winner is determined.

== Members ==
=== Current Teams ===
School	Location	Founded	Enrollment	Nicknames	Colors	Website
University of California - Berkeley	Berkeley, CA	1868	45,057	Golden Bears		https://www.calicehockey.com/
University of California - San Diego	La Jolla, CA	1960	45,273	Tritons		https://recreation.ucsd.edu/competitive-sports/ice-hockey/
Eastern Washington University	Cheney, WA	1882	10,915	Eagles		https://www.ewueagleshockey.com/
San Jose State University	San Jose, CA	1857	36,062	Spartans		https://sjsusports.com/sports/mens-ice-hockey
University of Southern California	Los Angeles, CA	1880	47,000	Trojans		https://trojanshockey.net/
University of Washington	Seattle, WA	1861	60,703	Huskies		https://www.huskyicehockey.com/
Washington State University	Pullman, WA	1890	26,490	Cougars		https://urec.wsu.edu/icehockeyclub/hockey-home/
Western Washington University	Bellingham, WA	1893	14,700	Vikings		https://www.wwuicehockey.com/

Former Teams

School	Location	Founded	Enrollment	Nickname	Colors
Arizona State	Tempe, AZ	1885	74,878	Sun Devils	
Boise State	Boise, ID	1932	24,154	Broncos	
Oregon	Eugene, OR	1876	23,634	Ducks	
San Diego State	San Diego, CA	1897	37,539	Aztecs	
Stanford	Stanford, CA	1891	16,914	Cardinal	
UCLA	Los Angeles, CA	1881	44,947	Bruins	
Utah	Salt Lake City, UT	1850	34,705	Utes	

== Tournament weekend ==
The PAC-8 Championship Tournament is typically held the weekend before Presidents Day in February. The weekend also consists of the annual league meeting and the end of season awards banquet.

== Past champions ==
Year	Champion	Runner-up	Host
2026	Washington	California	Eastern Washington
2025	Washington	California	Eastern Washington
2024	Utah	San Jose State	Eastern Washington
2023	Washington	Utah	Eastern Washington
2022	Oregon	UCLA	Regular Season Champions
2021	Season Cancelled		
2020	Oregon	Boise State	South Lake Tahoe
2019	Oregon	California	South Lake Tahoe
2018	Arizona State	California	South Lake Tahoe
2017	UCLA	Washington	South Lake Tahoe
2016	Utah	USC	South Lake Tahoe
2015	Utah	Oregon	South Lake Tahoe
2014	Arizona State	Utah	Utah
2013	Utah	Oregon	USC
2012	Washington	Utah	Washington
2011	Washington	Oregon	Washington
2010	USC	Washington	USC
2009	Oregon	Washington	Oregon
2008	Oregon	USC	Washington State
2007	USC	Oregon	UCLA
2006	USC	Oregon	Oregon
2005	Oregon	Washington	California
2004	California	USC	Washington
2003	USC	California	USC
2002	USC	Washington	Stanford
2001	USC	Washington	Oregon
2000	USC	UCLA	UCLA
1999	UCLA	USC	California
1998	USC		
1997	Stanford	UCLA	USC
1996	Stanford	California	Stanford

Totals

Team	Titles	Years
USC	8	2010, 2007, 2006, 2003, 2002, 2001, 2000, 1998
Oregon	6	2022, 2020, 2019, 2009, 2008, 2005
Washington	5	2026, 2025, 2023, 2012, 2011
Utah	4	2024, 2016, 2015, 2013
ASU	2	2018, 2014
UCLA	2	2017, 1999
Stanford	2	1997, 1996
California	1	2004

== See also ==
- American Collegiate Hockey Association
- List of ice hockey leagues
