= Great West Hockey Conference =

US college ice hockey competition

- Association: NCAA
- Founded: 1985
- Folded: 1988
- Sports fielded: Ice hockey
- Division: Division I
- No. of teams: 4 (1985–86), 3 (1986–87 & 1987–88)
- Region: Western United States, Alaska

The Great West Hockey Conference was a short-lived NCAA Division I college ice hockey conference. The conference was formed in 1985 by the four D-I independent schools west of the Rocky Mountains: the University of Alaska Anchorage, the University of Alaska Fairbanks, Northern Arizona University, and US International University; in an effort to ease scheduling issues.

The teams played a 12-game schedule in the 1985–86 season, with US International winning the championship. Northern Arizona dropped its hockey program after the season when its venue, the Walkup Skydome, required numerous repairs to the ice rink. The three remaining teams played two more seasons, with Alaska–Anchorage winning the 1986–87 championship, and Alaska–Fairbanks winning in 1987–88.

During the 1987–88 season, the conference announced intentions to expand to 9 teams and gain an automatic bid to the NCAA Men's Ice Hockey Championship. They invited three schools who had recently moved up from Division II: Alabama–Huntsville, Merrimack, and St. Cloud State; however, none of the schools joined. At the end of the season, US International dropped its varsity hockey program, citing high travel costs; three years later, the university declared bankruptcy.

With only two teams remaining, the conference dissolved. The two Alaska schools competed as independents until 1993, when Anchorage joined the Western Collegiate Hockey Association and Fairbanks joined the Central Collegiate Hockey Association. After the CCHA disbanded at the end of the 2012–13 season due to major conference realignment, the Alaska schools reunited in the WCHA.

== Members ==
Locations of member teams

Institution	Nickname	Location	Founded	Tenure	Fate	Current conference
University of Alaska Anchorage	Seawolves	Anchorage, Alaska	1977	1985–1988	Independent	
University of Alaska Fairbanks	Nanooks	Fairbanks, Alaska	1917	1985–1988	Independent	
Northern Arizona University	Lumberjacks	Flagstaff, Arizona	1899	1985–1986	dropped program	
US International University	Gulls	San Diego, California	1952	1985–1988	dropped program	
