= Darren Lowe (ice hockey) =

Canadian ice hockey player and coach

- Born: October 13, 1960 (age 65) Toronto, Ontario, Canada
- Height: 5 ft 10 in (178 cm)
- Weight: 187 lb (85 kg; 13 st 5 lb)
- Position: Right wing
- Shot: Right
- Played for: Pittsburgh Penguins; Wiener EV; Jokerit
- National team: Canada
- NHL draft: Undrafted
- Playing career: 1983–1991

Darren Craig Lowe (born October 13, 1960) is a Canadian former professional ice hockey player and former head coach of the University of Toronto Varsity Blues men's ice hockey team. He played 8 games in the National Hockey League with the Pittsburgh Penguins during the 1983–84 season. The rest of his career, which lasted from 1983 to 1991, was mainly spent in the minor leagues. Internationally he played for the Canadian national team at the 1984 Winter Olympics. After retiring as a player Lowe coached at the University of Toronto from 1995 to 2017.

== Playing career ==
Lowe was born in Toronto, Ontario. He played for the Varsity Blues from 1979 to 1983 as undergraduate student. Lowe was named to the OUAA Second All-star team in 1981–82, and the First All-star team in 1982–83. Lowe was selected as a member of the Canada national men's ice hockey team during 1983–84, playing 67 games, scoring 18 goals, and 15 assists. Lowe competed with the team at the 1984 Winter Olympics, finishing in 4th place. The Pittsburgh Penguins signed Lowe as a free agent, for whom he played eight games and scored one goal during the 1983–84 NHL season. Lowe returned to the Varsity Blues from 1984 to 1986 while earning a Bachelor of Education degree. In 1986, Lowe's, he received the university's George M. Biggs Trophy for leadership, sportsmanship and performance in athletics, and both the Harry Jerome Award and the U of T Silver "T" for excellence in athletics.

Lowe continued his professional career from 1986 to 1991, playing for Jokerit Helsinki scoring 7 goals and 2 assists in 18 games in 1986–87 season, the Flint Spirits, Maine Mariners and the San Diego Gulls. Lowe had career highs of 53 goals and 64 assists playing for Flint during the 1987–88 season.

== Coaching career ==
Lowe retired in 1991, and immediately went into coaching. Lowe joined the Ryerson Rams of Ryerson Polytechnical Institute as an assistant coach during the 1991–92 season. Lowe returned to the Varsity Blues as an assistant coach for the 1992–93 season, and became head coach during the 1995–96 season. For the 2002–03 season Lowe was honoured as the OUA East Division "Coach of the Year" for the second time in three years, he was also named coach of the year in 2000–01. He has led the Blues to four consecutive first-place finishes in the OUA's Mid-East Division. Lowe was also a guest coach in 1998 with the Toronto Maple Leafs, and spent time in the summer of 2001 working with some of the Leaf prospects. In 1999–2000, Lowe was a guest coach with the Canada national ice hockey team.

== Career statistics ==
=== Regular season and playoffs ===
			Regular season					Playoffs
Season	Team	League	GP	G	A	Pts	PIM	GP	G	A	Pts	PIM
1977–78	North York Rangers	OPJHL	—	—	—	—	—	—	—	—	—	—
1977–78	Kingston Canadians	OMJHL	1	0	0	0	2	—	—	—	—	—
1978–79	Richmond Hill Rams	OPJHL	—	—	—	—	—	—	—	—	—	—
1979–80	United States International University	NCAA	34	25	21	46	26	—	—	—	—	—
1980–81	University of Toronto	OUA	28	28	23	51	26	—	—	—	—	—
1981–82	University of Toronto	OUA	29	36	26	62	24	—	—	—	—	—
1982–83	University of Toronto	OUA	24	23	32	55	—	—	—	—	—	—
1983–84	Canadian National Team	Intl	67	18	15	33	22	—	—	—	—	—
1983–84	Pittsburgh Penguins	NHL	8	1	2	3	0	—	—	—	—	—
1984–85	Canadian National Team	Intl	67	18	15	33	22	—	—	—	—	—
1985–86	University of Toronto	OUA	24	21	26	47	16	—	—	—	—	—
1986–87	Wiener EV	AUT	22	18	11	29	6	—	—	—	—	—
1986–87	Jokerit	FIN	18	7	2	9	16	—	—	—	—	—
1987–88	Flint Spirits	IHL	82	53	64	117	24	16	10	15	25	34
1988–89	Maine Mariners	AHL	78	29	24	53	36	—	—	—	—	—
1989–90	Flint Spirits	IHL	67	31	35	66	44	4	1	4	5	2
1990–91	San Diego Gulls	IHL	79	21	37	58	60	—	—	—	—	—
IHL totals			228	105	136	241	128	20	11	19	30	36
NHL totals			8	1	2	3	0	—	—	—	—	—

=== International ===
Year	Team	Event	GP	G	A	Pts	PIM
1984	Canada	OLY	7	2	1	3	0
Senior totals			7	2	1	3	0
