= Alaska Nanooks men's ice hockey =

- Current season
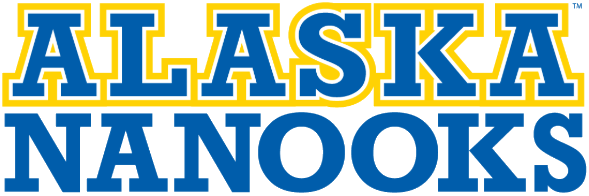
- University: University of Alaska Fairbanks
- Conference: Independent
- First season: 1925–26
- Head coach: Erik Largen; 7th season, 108–107–24 (.502)
- Assistant coaches: Matt Curley; Ryan Theros; Sean Walsh
- Arena: Carlson Center; Fairbanks, Alaska
- Colors: Blue and gold

NCAA tournament appearances
- DI: 2010 (Note: Vacated by NCAA.); DII: 1984

Conference tournament champions
- UCHC: 2026

Conference regular season champions
- GWHC: 1988

Current uniform

The Alaska Nanooks men's ice hockey team is a National Collegiate Athletic Association (NCAA) Division I college ice hockey program that represents the University of Alaska Fairbanks. The Nanooks are an independent program. They play at the Carlson Center in Fairbanks, Alaska.

== History ==
=== Early history (1925–1973) ===
Varsity hockey at Alaska-Fairbanks began in 1925. The team played four games during the inaugural 1925–26 season and finished the season with a 3–1–0 record despite having no coach. The program returned in 1932 and for three additional seasons the team operated without a coach as an independent collegiate program. Alfred Bastress joined the Nanooks in 1937 and became the program's first head coach. Bastress led the Nanooks for four seasons. The team played the 1939–40 season again with no coach and Joe Gerlach coached the team during the 1941–42 season, splitting both games the team played that season. The program was suspended during World War II and returned for the 1949–50 season.

The team went through six coaches through the 1950s before Bill Daltri took over behind the bench in 1960. Daltri led the Nanooks for three seasons, including some of the most successful seasons of the early history of the program. In 1960–61 Daltri's Nanooks finished with a record of 14–2–0 and in the 1961–62 season the team finished 10–1–1. In his final season as head coach Daltri's Nanooks won all 8 games of the 1962–63 season. The program would go through another period of coaching turnovers, going through 9 coaches in a ten-year period from 1963 to 1973.

=== Division II era (1973–1984) ===
Following the 1972–73 season the program moved from the University Division to NCAA Division II, when the different levels became numerically organized. Between '74 and '80 the Nanooks played just two seasons as a varsity program and continued to have trouble scheduling opponents. After a reinvestment in the program, Ric Schafer took over as head coach in 1980 and began to build the Nanooks into a respectable team. After winning just twice in his first two seasons, Schafer got the team to post a program-record 19 wins in 1983 and then produce back-to-back 20+ win seasons immediately afterwards. In 1984, the entire Division II ice hockey level collapsed and, while most programs dropped down to Division III, Alaska promoted the ice hockey team to Division I.

=== Great West Hockey Conference and independence (1985–1994) ===
After a year as an independent program, The Nanooks joined with in-state rival Alaska-Anchorage as well as U.S. International University (San Diego) and Northern Arizona University (Flagstaff, Arizona) to form the Great West Hockey Conference.

Though small to begin with, the GWHC shrunk when Northern Arizona suspended their varsity program after the first season. The conference lasted just three years in total, but it was long enough for Alaska's new head coach, Don Lucia, to lead the team to its first ever conference title in 1988.

U.S. International followed Northern Arizona into ice hockey oblivion in 1988, leaving the two Alaska schools to play as independents for several years. With Alaska being so far away from most other Division I programs, the NCAA does not include any games played against either school as part of a team's game limit during the season. This enabled Alaska to survive during the early 1990s and post three separate 20-win seasons.

=== CCHA / WCHA (1994–2021) ===
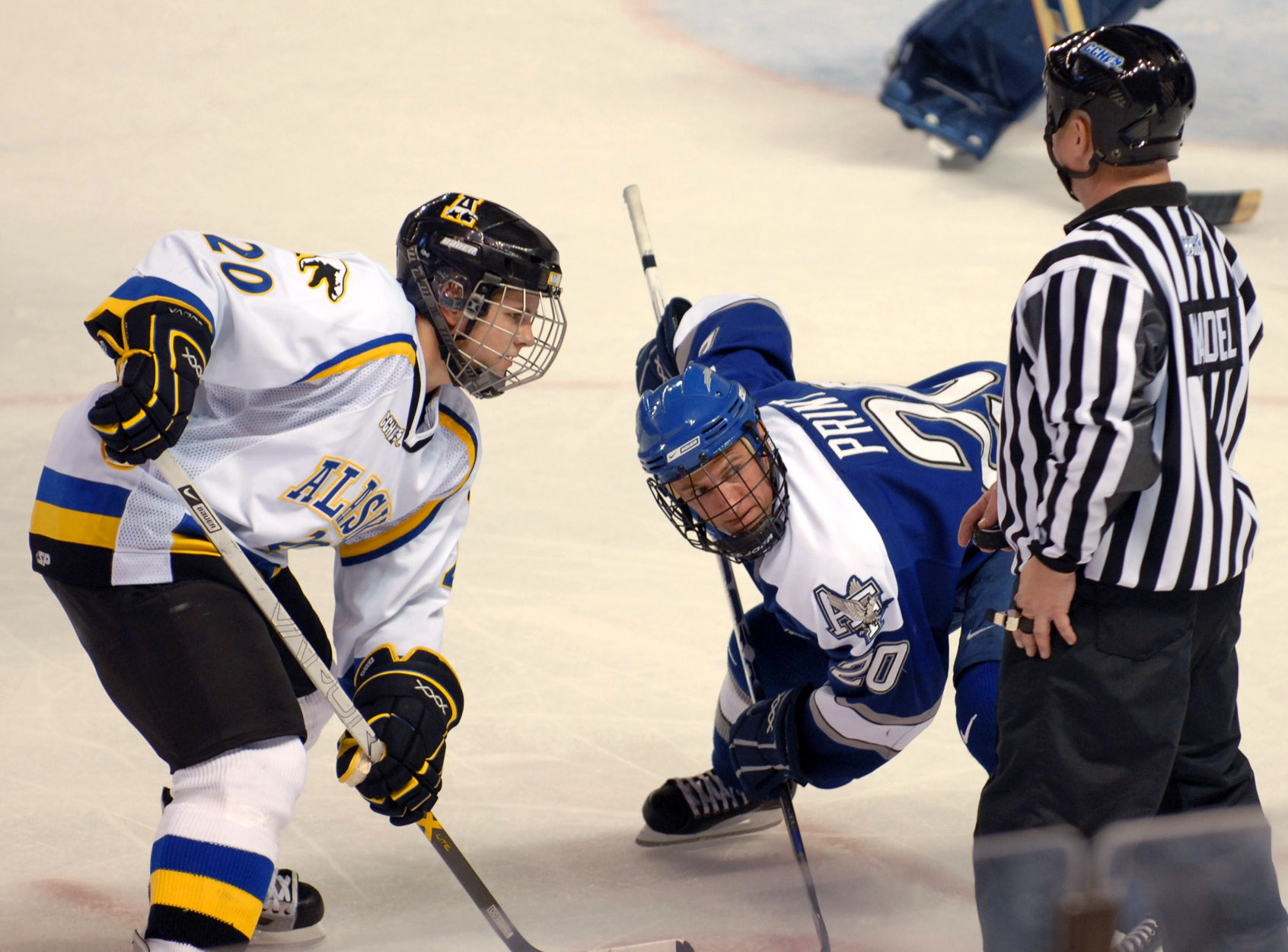
The faceoff of a non-conference game between Alaska and Air Force on October 14, 2006. Alaska won this game by a score of 8 to 4.

In 1994, while Anchorage joined the WCHA, Alaska was invited to participate as an affiliate member of the CCHA. While none of their games were counted in the conference standings, the stabilization of their schedule provided a solid footing for the Nanooks to build their program.

Dave Laurion, who had replaced Lucia in 1993, led Alaska for their early tenure in the CCHA but couldn't get the team out of the cellar. Guy Gadowsky was brought in during 1999 and raised the profile of the Nanooks after a few lean years. Gadowsky left to take over at Princeton in 2004 and the program began to slip back down the standings until Dallas Ferguson was introduced in 2008. In just his second season with the program, Ferguson led the Nanooks to their first ever NCAA Tournament appearance and kept the team in good standing for most of his 9-years with the program.

2011 saw significant changes for the program, beginning with the announcement by the Big Ten Conference that it would begin sponsoring men's ice hockey in 2013. While that would cause three teams from the CCHA to leave for their primary conference, Miami joined with five other schools from the WCHA to form a separate conference, the NCHC. The CCHA disintegration continued when Northern Michigan was approved for membership in the WCHA, and the conference began scrambling to find a way to survive.

On August 23, 2011 members of the WCHA and CCHA met in Chicago, Illinois in reaction to the realignment. Afterwards, the WCHA sent invitations to the five remaining CCHA schools and Alaska quickly accepted the invitation to join the league for the 2013–14 season.

Later in the year, administrative officials at Alaska discovered that the school had failed to properly monitor the academic eligibility of several players from multiple sports dating back to 2007. The violations were immediately brought to the attention of the NCAA, which began an investigation to determine the size and scope of the failure. In 2014 the NCAA concluded that UAF was lacking in institutional control and had failed to update their inadequate compliance system despite having been warned about it. The majority of the violations involved players who had not declared a major, or had not accrued enough credits towards their declared major(s), or who had been allowed to transfer in from a junior college when they did not meet academic eligibility standards. The school admitted guilt and was required to pay a fine, suspend several scholarships and forfeit all wins and ties in games where ineligible players had participated. As a result, the ice hockey program has no wins from 2007–08 through the 2011–12 season and no record of an NCAA tournament appearance in 2010. Alaska was also ruled ineligible for the 2015 postseason.

The second decade of the 21st century was not very successful for the Nanooks either; despite finishing with winning records in several seasons, Alaska lost every single playoff round they participated in from 2011 through 2020. In 2019, seven teams from the WCHA announced that they would be leaving the conference to form a more geographically-cohesive conference. With Alaska being approximately 3,000 miles away from the nearest opponent (excluding Anchorage) the Nanooks were in jeopardy of returning to independent status. Soon after that, Alaska was forced to cancel its entire 2020-21 season due to the COVID-19 pandemic. All of this was also happening under a cloud of financial hardship caused by a state budget crunch. The funding for the program became so tenuous that a proposal was circulated to merge the Nanooks with the Seawolves in order to save money. That plan never came to pass, but budget constraints did eventually lead to a temporary suspension of Alaska Anchorage's hockey program.

=== Wilderness years (2021–present) ===
When Alaska returned to the ice in 2021, they did so as an independent. Alaska scheduled several meetings with the other two Independent programs (Arizona State and Long Island) and put together a solid season with a 14-18-2 record after starting the season with only one win in their first 13 competitive games. The Nanooks took a huge step forward in 2022-23, finishing with a record of 22-10-2, their best season by winning percentage since the 1987-88 campaign. In 2023-24, the Nanooks finished with another winning record, their first consecutive seasons with winning records in nearly a decade.

In early 2025, Alaska and the other Division I Independent teams began planning a "conference tournament" for the Independent teams to play in at the end of their seasons. While this would not provide a bid to the national tournament, it would give the Nanooks something to play for at the end of their season for the first time since the collapse of the WCHA. Following the 2025-26 regular season, the Nanooks were ranked first amongst Independent teams by NPI and were awarded the #1 seed at the inaugural United Collegiate Hockey Cup. In the semifinals, the Nanooks found themselves down 4-3 to Stonehill late in the 3rd period. At the 19:59 mark in the 3rd period, the Nanooks scored in a frantic scramble in front of the net, sending the game to OT, where they eventually won in a shootout. The Nanooks would go on to win the championship over Lindenwood 4-3 in overtime. While this was not an official conference championship, it did act as a de facto "conference championship" for the Independent teams. Thus giving Alaska its first "conference championship" in team history.

== Brice Alaska Goal Rush ==
The Brice Alaska Goal Rush is one of two annual ice hockey tournaments (along with the Kendall Hockey Classic) that are traditionally played in the first two weeks of the NCAA Division-I season. The Kendall tournament opens the season, and the Alaska Goal Rush is played in the second week. The tournament is held at the Carlson Center in Fairbanks, Alaska, and is hosted by University of Alaska-Fairbanks hockey team.

The tournament takes place over two days and follows a round robin format. The hockey team from the University of Alaska-Anchorage is a regular participant and serves as an unofficial co-host, while two guest schools round out the tournament field every year. Each of the Alaska schools plays one game against the guest teams, but do not play against each other. The invitees do not square off either. The first criteria to determine place order are records, and then goal-differential in the event of any ties.

The tournament began in the fall of 2008, and its title is a play on the historical Alaska Gold Rush. Fairbanks has won the tournament four times (most recently in 2013), and Anchorage has won it twice. No guest team has been able to win the crown yet in its six-year history.

=== Tournament results ===
Year	Champion	Runner-up	3rd Place	4th Place
2008	Alaska-Anchorage	Alaska-Fairbanks	Maine	Mercyhurst
2009	Alaska-Fairbanks	Robert Morris	Alaska-Anchorage	Rensselaer
2010	Alaska-Fairbanks	Union, Colorado College		Alaska-Anchorage
2011	Alaska-Anchorage	Alaska-Fairbanks	Mercyhurst	Nebraska-Omaha
2012	Alaska-Fairbanks	North Dakota	Alaska-Anchorage	Merrimack
2013	Alaska-Fairbanks	Western Michigan	Alaska-Anchorage	Denver

== Coaches ==
Typically, Alaska has not had much luck in keeping their coaches for very long. The program has had 26 different head coaches in 69 seasons from 1925 to 2018 and played six of those years without a bench boss. This is not only the most overall for any Division I hockey team but it is among the lowest average (2.65 years) for any school in any sport. As of 2018 Dallas Ferguson was the longest-tenured coach in the history of the program, serving for 9 seasons.

=== All-time coaching records ===
As of completion of 2025–26 season

Tenure	Coach	Years	Record	Pct.
1925–1926	No Coach	1	3–1–0	.750
1932–1935	No Coach	3	8–4–1	.591
1935–1939	Alfred Bastress	4	4–6–1	.409
1939–1940	No Coach	1	0–2–1	.167
1940–1941	Joe Gerlach	1	1–1–0	.500
1949–1950	Jim Welsch	1	1–4–0	.200
1950–1951	Coach Urick	1	0–6–0	.000
1953–1954	Coach Gilhooley	1	0–4–0	.000
1954–1955	Chris Christensen	1	1–3–0	.250
1956–1957	Ken Smith	1	1–4–0	.200
1957–1958	Bill Borland	1	2–2–0	.500
1960–1963	Bill Daltri	3	32–3–1	.903
1963–1964	Larry Bidlake	1	8–5–0	.615
1964–1965	Jack Peterson	1	5–4–0	.556
1965–1966	Ed Armstrong	1	1–6–0	.143
1966–1967	Jim Perry	1	1–2–0	.333
1967–1969	Jim Perry	2	5–12–0	.294
1969–1971	Fred Stevenson	2	17–21–2	.450
1971–1972	Gary Weitz	1	6–5–0	.545
1972–1973	Ray Korkiala	1	14–10–1	.580
1973–1974	Bob Gaddis	1	1–7–0	.125
1977–1978	Tim Homan	1	14–3–1	.806
1980–1987	Ric Schafer	7	99–82–3	.546
1987–1993	Don Lucia	6	99–97–19	.505
1993–1999	Dave Laurion	6	80–122–9	.400
1999–2004	Guy Gadowsky	5	68–89–22	.441
2004–2007	Tavis MacMillan	3	46–54–15	.465
2007–2008	Doc DelCastillo	1	0–35–0†	.000
2008–2017	Dallas Ferguson	9	76–238–18†	.256
2017–2018	Lance West	1	11–22–3	.347
2018–Present	Erik Largen	7	108–107–24	.502
Totals	27 coaches	76 seasons	740–954–112	.441

†Alaska was retroactively forced to forfeit all wins and ties from 2007–08 through 2011–12 due to player ineligibilities.

== Players ==
=== Current roster ===
As of October 6, 2026.

No.	Nat.	Player	Class	Pos	Height	Weight	DoB	Hometown	Previous team	NHL rights
2	(United States)	Carson Reed	Junior	D	6' 0" (1.83 m)	194 lb (88 kg)	2004-04-20	Warroad, Minnesota	Waterloo Black Hawks (USHL)	—
5	(United States)	Liam Fleet	Sophomore	D	6' 2" (1.88 m)	205 lb (93 kg)	2004-04-19	Denver, Colorado	Shreveport Mudbugs (NAHL)	—
6	(Canada)	Jhett Larson	Sophomore	F	5' 9" (1.75 m)	176 lb (80 kg)	2004-02-03	Delisle, Saskatchewan	Red Deer Rebels (WHL)	—
7	(United States)	Jackson Anderson	Sophomore	D	6' 2" (1.88 m)	170 lb (77 kg)	2004-02-26	Prior Lake, Minnesota	Surrey Eagles (BCHL)	—
8	(Latvia)	Davis Borozinskis	Sophomore	F	6' 0" (1.83 m)	190 lb (86 kg)	2004-10-26	Liepaja, Latvia	Omaha Lancers (USHL)	—
9	(Canada)	Dean Spak	Junior	F	5' 10" (1.78 m)	181 lb (82 kg)	2003-02-21	Calgary, Alberta	Okotoks Oilers (BCHL)	—
10	(United States)	Jack Rogers	Senior	F	6' 3" (1.91 m)	201 lb (91 kg)	2002-09-23	East Northport, New York	St. Cloud State (NCHC)	—
11	(Canada)	Kyle Powers	Freshman	F	6' 1" (1.85 m)	192 lb (87 kg)	2005-02-17	Ottawa, Ontario	Baie-Comeau Drakkar (QMJHL)	—
12	(United States)	Dominik Bartecko	Junior	D	5' 9" (1.75 m)	174 lb (79 kg)	2003-10-05	Prague, Czechia	Mercyhurst (AHA)	—
13	(Japan)	Tai Ushio	Freshman	F	5' 8" (1.73 m)	161 lb (73 kg)	2005-12-05	Hokkaido, Japan	Prince George Spruce Kings (BCHL)	—
14	(Canada)	Seth Fryer	Freshman	D	6' 7" (2.01 m)	209 lb (95 kg)	2006-06-23	Victoria, British Columbia	Victoria Royals (WHL)	—
15	(Canada)	Dylan Sydor	Sophomore	F	5' 10" (1.78 m)	170 lb (77 kg)	2003-04-07	Kamloops, British Columbia	Calgary (Canada West)	—
16	(Canada)	Linden Burrett	Freshman	D	6' 2" (1.88 m)	183 lb (83 kg)	2006-02-06	Surrey, British Columbia	Prince Albert Raiders (WHL)	—
17	(Ukraine)	Mykhailo Danylov	Sophomore	F	5' 8" (1.73 m)	154 lb (70 kg)	2004-08-01	Kyiv, Ukraine	Green Bay Gamblers (USHL)	—
18	(Canada)	Rylan Roersma	Sophomore	D	5' 11" (1.8 m)	190 lb (86 kg)	2004-07-25	Lethbridge, Alberta	Brandon Wheat Kings (WHL)	—
20	(United States)	Grady Gallatin	Junior	D	6' 4" (1.93 m)	205 lb (93 kg)	2004-06-07	White Bear Lake, Minnesota	Western Michigan (NCHC)	—
23	(Canada)	Sam Elliot	Freshman	F	6' 1" (1.85 m)	161 lb (73 kg)	2004-03-15	White Rock, British Columbia	Wenatchee Wild (WHL)	—
24	(United States)	Lukas Klemm	Sophomore	D	6' 2" (1.88 m)	194 lb (88 kg)	2004-04-20	Ridgefield, Connecticut	Mercyhurst (AHA)	—
29	(United States)	Beau Courtney	Freshman	F	6' 2" (1.88 m)	194 lb (88 kg)	2004-01-12	Parker, Colorado	Kamloops Blazers (WHL)	—
31	(United States)	Zak Brice	Freshman (RS)	G	5' 11" (1.8 m)	174 lb (79 kg)	2003-01-25	Fairbanks, Alaska	Arizona State (NCHC)	—
32	(United States)	Calvin Vachon	Freshman	G	5' 11" (1.8 m)	168 lb (76 kg)	2005-07-19	Redondo Beach, California	Waterloo Black Hawks (USHL)	—
34	(United States)	Kyle Miller	Freshman	D	5' 9" (1.75 m)	174 lb (79 kg)	2004-10-14	San Jose, California	St. Cloud Norsemen (NAHL)	—
35	(Finland)	Lassi Lehti	Senior	G	6' 3" (1.91 m)	210 lb (95 kg)	2001-11-29	Espoo, Finland	Minot Minotauros (NAHL)	—
37	(Canada)	Chase Dafoe	Senior	F	6' 3" (1.91 m)	200 lb (91 kg)	2002-02-25	Peachland, British Columbia	Providence (HEA)	—

== Olympians ==
This is a list of Alaska alumni were a part of an Olympic team.

Name	Position	Alaska Tenure	Team	Year	Finish
Colton Parayko	Defenseman	2012–2015	(Canada) CAN	2026	Silver

== Nanooks in the NHL ==
As of July 1, 2025.

Player	Position	Team(s)	Years	Games	Stanley Cups
Darcy Campbell	Defense	CBJ	2006–2007	1	0
Shawn Chambers	Defense	MNS, WSH, TBL, NJD, DAL	1987–2000	625	2
Tyler Eckford	Defense	NJD	2009–2011	7	0
Kyle Greentree	Left wing	PHI, CGY	2007–2009	4	0
Jordan Hendry	Defense	CHI , ANA	2007–2013	131	1
Chad Johnson	Goaltender	NYR, PHO, BOS, NYI, BUF, CGY, STL, ANA	2009–2019	192	0
Cody Kunyk	Forward	TBL	2013–2014	1	0
Colton Parayko	Defense	STL	2015–Present	723	1
Jeff Penner	Defense	BOS	2009–2010	2	0
Corey Spring	Right wing	TBL	1997–1999	16	0
Aaron Voros	Right wing	MIN, NYR, ANA	2007–2011	162	0
Dwayne Zinger	Defense	WSH	2003–2004	7	0

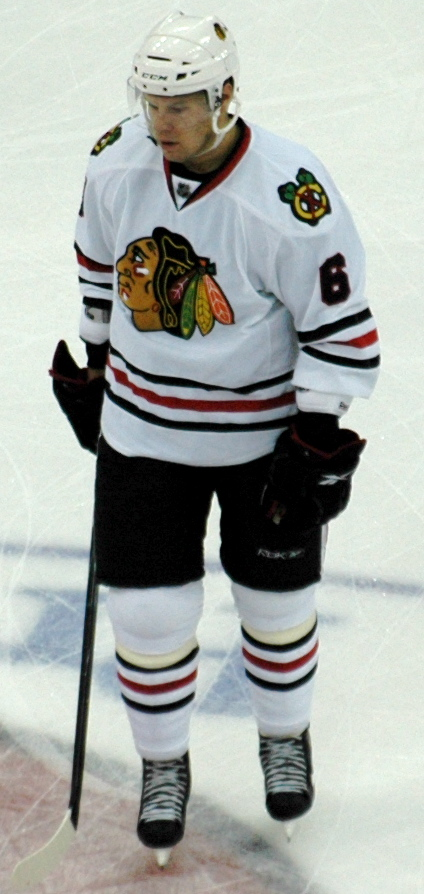
Jordan Hendry

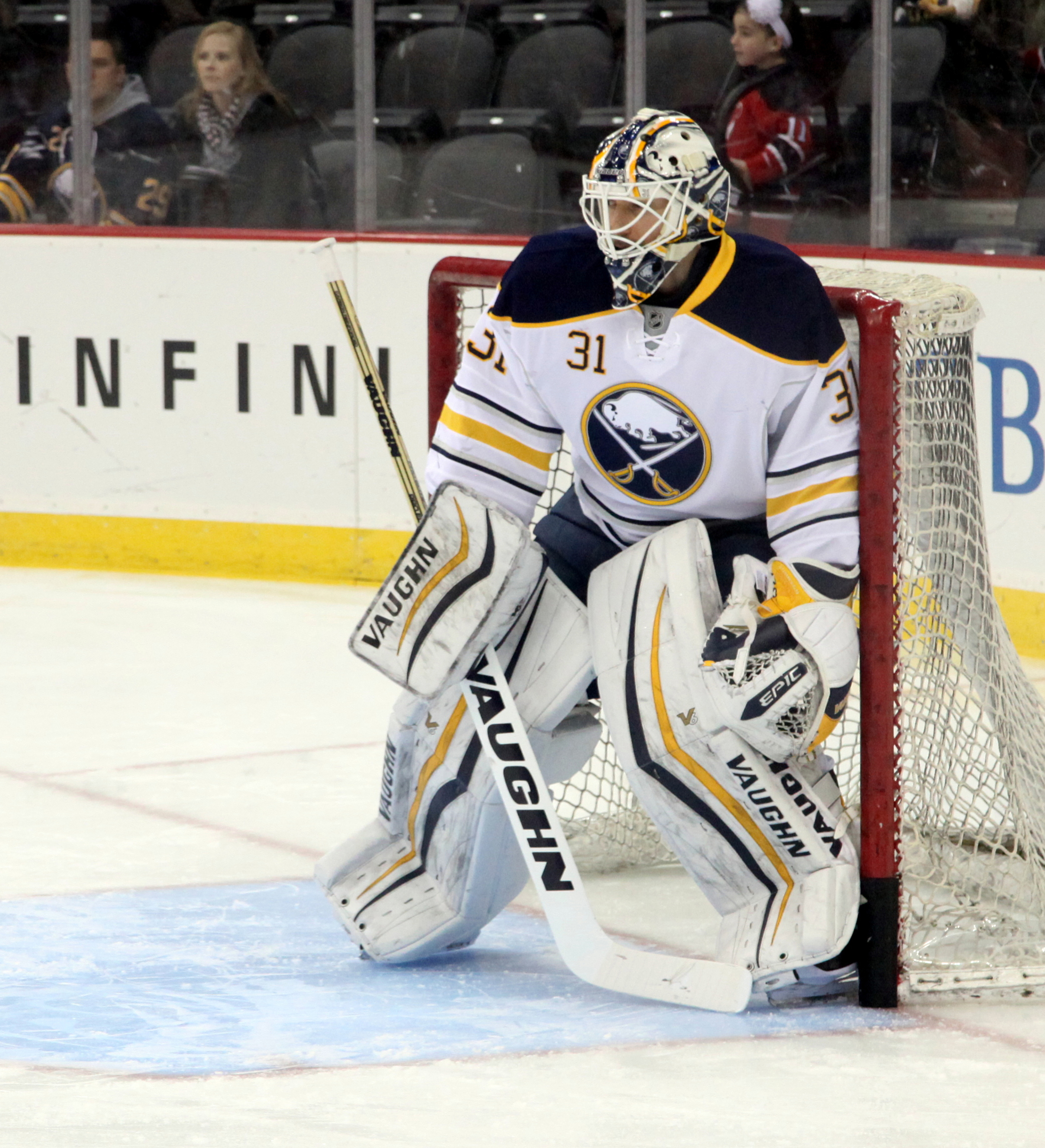
Chad Johnson

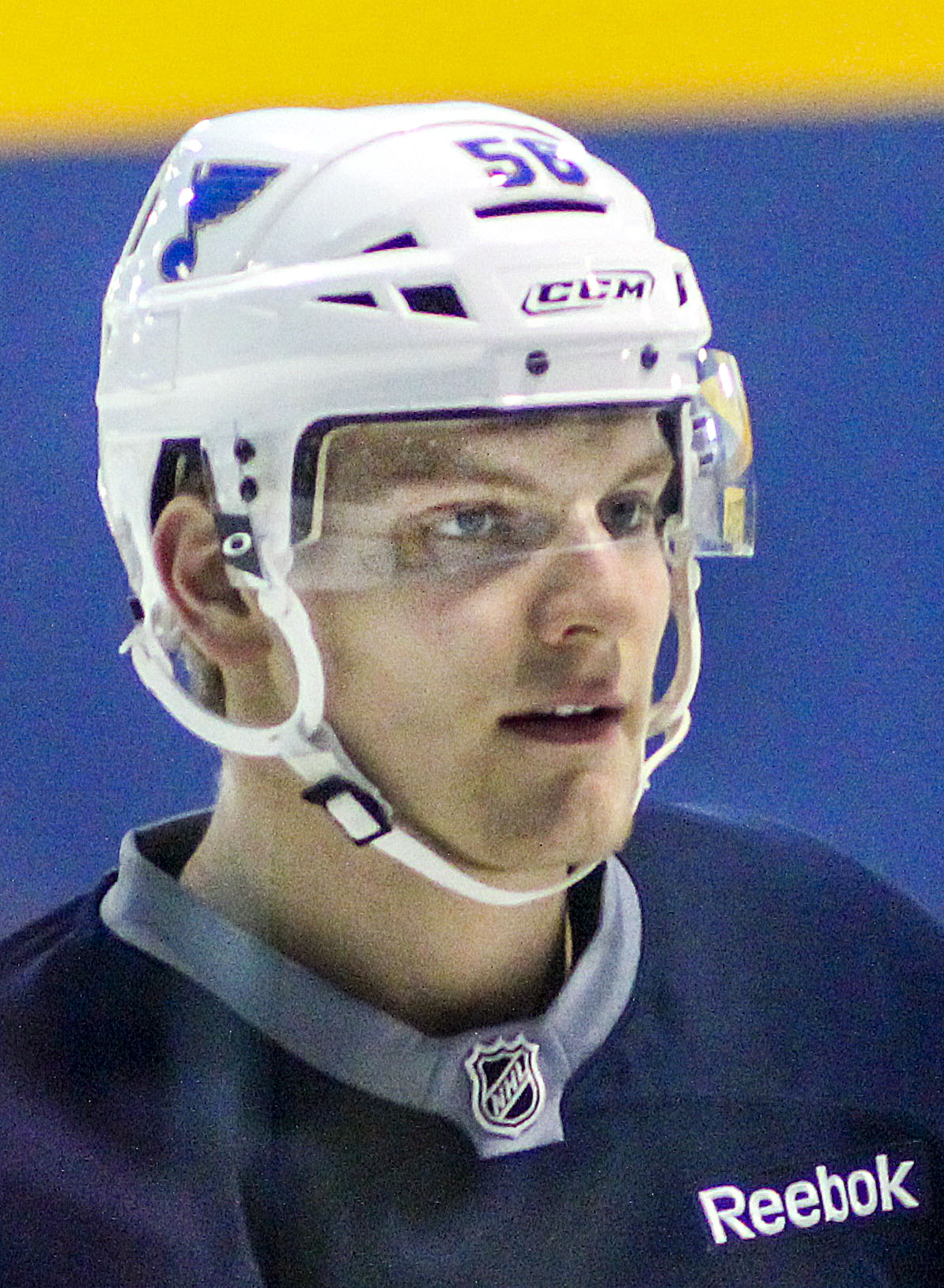
Colton Parayko
