= Chanson =

Lyric-driven French song

- Stylistic origins: Poetry
- Cultural origins: Late medieval era, France
- Derivative forms: Chanson courtoise; Chanson de geste; Motet-chanson

A chanson (UK: /ˈʃɒ̃sɒ̃/, US: /ʃɑːnˈsɔːn/; French: chanson française [ʃɑ̃sɔ̃ fʁɑ̃sɛːz], lit. 'French song') is generally any lyric-driven French song. The term is most commonly used in English to refer either to the secular polyphonic French songs of late medieval and Renaissance music or to a specific style of French pop music which emerged in the 1950s and 1960s. The genre had origins in the monophonic songs of troubadours and trouvères, though the only polyphonic precedents were 16 works by Adam de la Halle and one by Jehan de Lescurel. Not until the ars nova composer Guillaume de Machaut did any composer write a significant number of polyphonic chansons.

A broad term, the word chanson literally means "song" in French and can thus less commonly refer to a variety of (usually secular) French genres throughout history. This includes the songs of chansonnier, chanson de geste and Grand chant; court songs of the late Renaissance and early Baroque music periods, air de cour; popular songs from the 17th to 19th century, bergerette, brunette, chanson pour boire, pastourelle, and vaudeville; art song of the romantic era, mélodie; and folk music, chanson populaire. Since the 1990s, the term may be used for Nouvelle Chanson, a French song that often contains poetic or political content.

== High medieval precedents ==
=== Chanson de geste ===
The earliest chansons were the epic poems performed to simple monophonic melodies by a professional class of jongleurs or ménestrels. These usually recounted the famous deeds (geste) of past heroes, legendary and semi-historical. The Song of Roland is the most famous of these, but in general the chansons de geste are studied as literature since very little of their music survives.

=== Chanson courtoise ===
The chanson courtoise or grand chant was an early form of monophonic chanson, the chief lyric poetic genre of the trouvères. It was an adaptation to Old French of the Occitan canso. It was practised in the 12th and 13th centuries. Thematically, as its name implies, it was a song of courtly love, written usually by a man to his noble lover. Some later chansons were polyphonic and some had refrains and were called chansons avec des refrains.

== Late medieval and early Renaissance ==
=== Formes fixes ===
In its typical specialized usage, the word chanson refers to a polyphonic French song of the late Middle Ages and Renaissance. Early chansons tended to be in one of the formes fixes—ballade, rondeau or virelai (formerly the chanson baladée)—though some composers later set popular poetry in a variety of forms. The earliest chansons were for two, three or four voices, with first three becoming the norm, expanding to four voices by the 16th century. Sometimes, the singers were accompanied by instruments.

The first important composer of chansons was Guillaume de Machaut, who composed three-voice works in the formes fixes during the 14th century.

=== Burgundian chanson ===
Two composers from Burgundy, Guillaume Du Fay and Gilles Binchois, who wrote so-called Burgundian chansons, dominated the subsequent generation of chanson composers (c. 1420–1470). Their chansons, while somewhat simple in style, are also generally in three voices with a structural tenor. These works are typically still 3 voices, with an active upper voice (discantus) pitched above two lower voices (tenor and altus) usually sharing the same range. Musicologist David Fallows includes the Burgundian repertoire in A Catalogue of Polyphonic Songs 1415–1480.

== Mid-late Renaissance chanson ==
Later 15th- and early 16th-century figures in the genre included Johannes Ockeghem and Josquin des Prez, whose works cease to be constrained by formes fixes and begin to feature a pervading imitation (all voices sharing material and moving at similar speeds), similar to that found in contemporary motets and liturgical music. The first book of music printed from movable type was Harmonice Musices Odhecaton, a collection of ninety-six chansons by many composers, published in Venice in 1501 by Ottaviano Petrucci.

=== Parisian chanson ===
Beginning in the late 1520s through mid-century, Claudin de Sermisy, Pierre Certon, Clément Janequin, and Philippe Verdelot were composers of so-called Parisian chansons, which also abandoned the formes fixes, often featured four voices, and were in a simpler, more homophonic style. This genre sometimes featured music that was meant to be evocative of certain imagery such as birds or the marketplace. Many of these Parisian works were published by Pierre Attaingnant. Composers of their generation, as well as later composers, such as Orlando de Lassus, were influenced by the Italian madrigal.

== Modern chanson ==
French solo song developed in the late 16th century, probably from the aforementioned Parisian works. During the 17th century, the air de cour, chanson pour boire and other like genres, generally accompanied by lute or keyboard, flourished, with contributions by such composers as Antoine Boesset, Denis Gaultier, Michel Lambert and Michel-Richard de Lalande. This still affects today's chanson as many French musicians still employ harp and keyboard.

During the 18th century, vocal music in France was dominated by opera, but solo song underwent a renaissance in the 19th century, first with salon melodies and then by mid-century with highly sophisticated works influenced by the German Lieder, which had been introduced into the country. Louis Niedermeyer, under the particular spell of Schubert, was a pivotal figure in this movement, followed by Édouard Lalo, Felicien David and many others.

Another offshoot of chanson, called chanson réaliste (realist song), was a popular musical genre in France, primarily from the 1880s until the end of World War II. Born of the cafés-concerts and cabarets of the Montmartre district of Paris and influenced by literary realism and the naturalist movements in literature and theatre, chanson réaliste was a musical style which was mainly performed by women and dealt with the lives of Paris's poor and working class. Among the better-known performers of the genre are Damia, Fréhel, and Édith Piaf.

Later 19th-century composers of French art songs, known as mélodie and not chanson, included Ernest Chausson, Emmanuel Chabrier, Gabriel Fauré, and Claude Debussy, while many 20th-century and current French composers have continued this strong tradition.

=== Revival ===
In the 20th century, French composers revived the genre. Claude Debussy composed Trois Chansons for choir a capella, completed in 1908. Maurice Ravel wrote Trois Chansons for choir a cappella after the outbreak of World War I as a return to French tradition, published in 1916.

=== Nouvelle chanson ===
In modern-day France, chanson or chanson française is distinguished from the rest of French "pop" music by following the rhythms of the French language rather than those of English and having a higher standard for lyrics.

=== Museum ===
In La Planche, Loire-Atlantique, the Musée de la chanson française was established in 1992. The museum has the goal to remember the artists that have established the heritage of the chanson.

== See also ==
- Canzone – Italian or Provençal song or ballad
- Russian chanson – Variety of genres of Russian music
