= Christophe Ballard =

French Baroque music printer

- Born: April 12, 1641; Paris
- Died: May 28, 1715 (74 years old); Paris
- Occupation: Music publisher
- Years active: 1673-1715 (42 years)
- Predecessor: Robert III Ballard
- Successor: Jean-Baptiste Christophe Ballard
- Spouse: Marie Lamiel

Signature
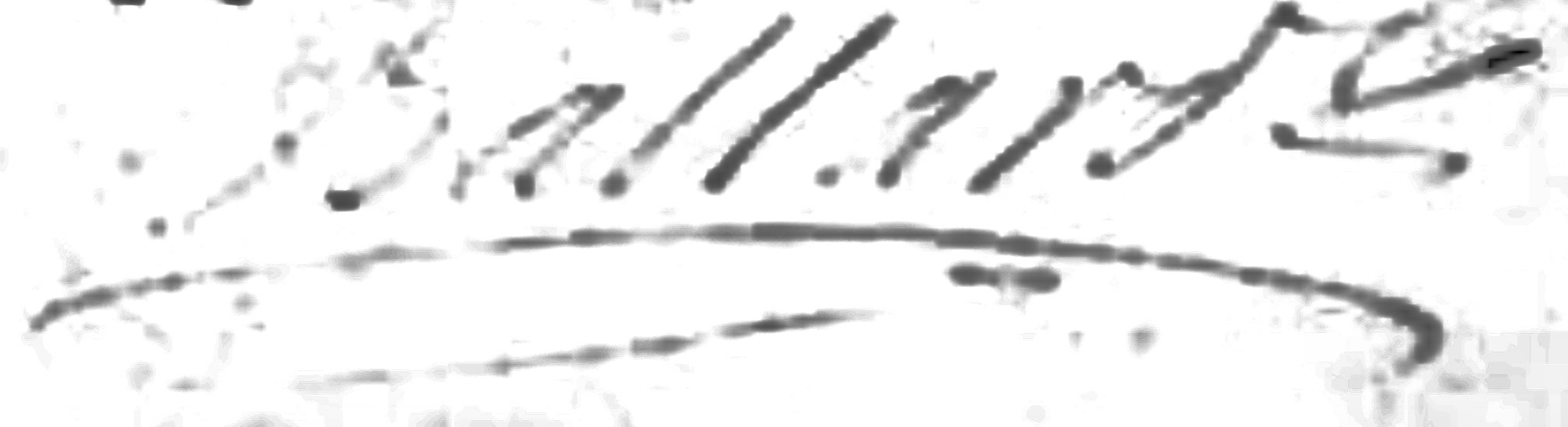

Christophe Ballard (French pronunciation: [kʁistɔf balaʁ]; April 12, 1641 — May 28, 1715) was a Parisian printer, bookseller, and music publisher employed by Louis XIV, from the family of publishers founded by Robert Ballard (1530–1588) in the mid-16th century. Christophe Ballard was the eldest son and only successor of Robert III Ballard and, like him, was the king's imprimeur ordinaire active from 1673 until the end of his life.

Around 1700, the printing house was at its highest point: he maintained four presses and employed nine helpers and two apprentices. Ballard still used antiquated movable type with diamond-shaped notes that were designed and cast for Robert Ballard and his son-in-law Adrian Le Roy (ca. 1520–1598) in the 1550s by Ballard’s father-in-law, Guillaume Le Bé. Pierre I Ballard directed the workshop on the rue Saint-Jean de Beauvais from 1599 to 1639, followed from 1639 to 1673 by his son Robert III Ballard. In 1713, Jean-Marie Leclair, François Couperin and other musicians obtained the privileges of printing music from engraved plates. Ballard brought the case to court, but lost: he was considered to have the exclusive right only to print music in movable type.

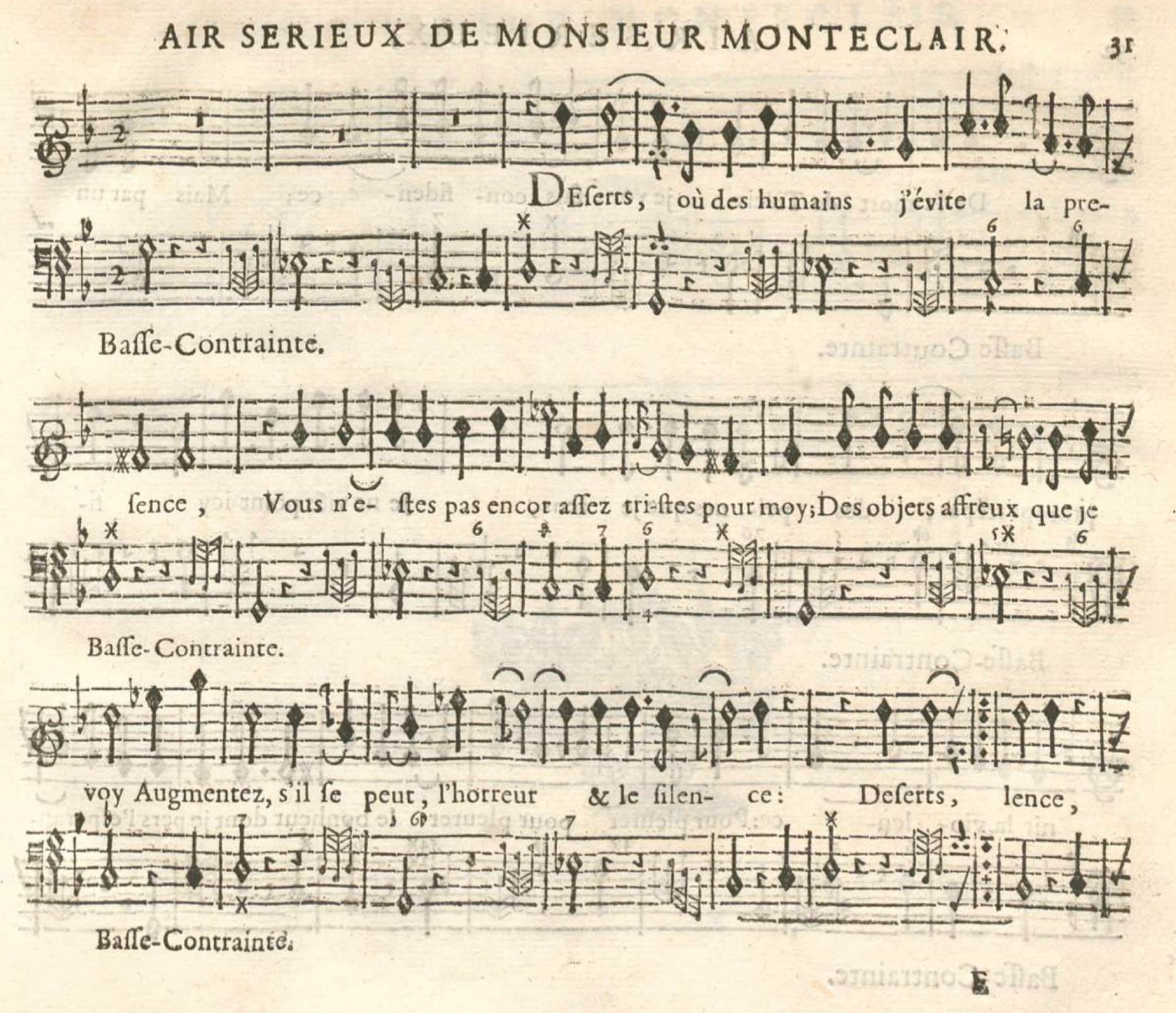
Ballard’s moyenne musique

He published almost all the French music of the time: Jean-Baptiste Lully's tragedies lyriques, André Campra's operas, and the works of André Cardinal Destouches, Henri Desmarets, minor works by Couperin, Jean-Philippe Rameau, works by Pascal Collasse, Jean-François Dandrieu, Marin Marais, Marc-Antoine Charpentier, Jacques-Martin Hotteterre, Michel Richard Delalande, Nicolas Lebègue and Michel Pignolet de Montéclair, in addition to Recueils d’airs sérieux et à boire published monthly from 1695 to 1724. Ballard also printed Italian songs in a series of Recueils des meilleurs airs italiens from 1699 to 1708, and Brunettes in three duodecimo books dated 1703, 1704, and 1711.

Ballard's son, Jean-Baptiste Christophe Ballard (who had been running the printing press with Ballard since 1698) ran the press from 1715 until his death in 1750. During this period, he printed many important works, such as partitions générale of Lully’s Psyché and Campra’s L’Europe Galante Upon his death, an inventory of the Ballard firm’s library was drawn up. Ballard was also the grandfather of La veuve Boivin.

== Typographic equipment ==
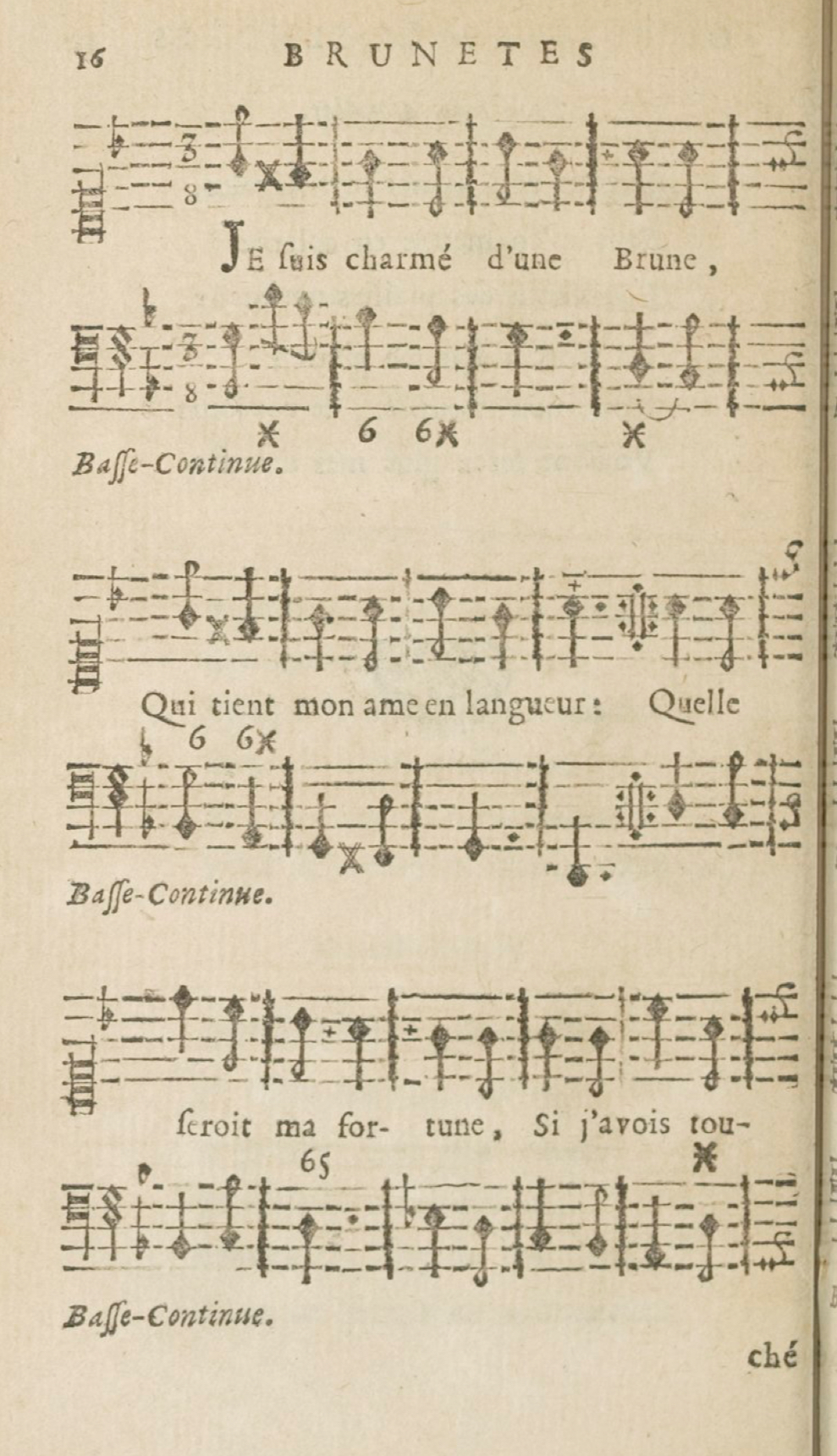
The petite musique type of the Ballard firm.

The Ballard family used several distinct types for printing music:

- the grosse musique, made in 1555 by Guillaume Le Bé, and its corresponding plainchant type (5-lined stave = 14.7 mm)
- the moyenne musique, made in Germany, and its corresponding plainchant type (5-lined stave = 10.5mm)
- the moyenne musique en ove, made by Le Bé c.1559. This type is of the same dimensions as the standard moyenne musique and often interspersed with it when beamed notes were called for. This type also shared clefs with it.
- the petite musique and its corresponding plainchant type (5-lined stave = 7.5 mm). This type was used whenever an economy of space was called for, such as in Christophe Ballard’s 12mo volumes.
- the French lute tablature en espace, made by Robert Granjon c.1558

Other equipment used by the shop include decorative woodcut initials and six additional woodcuts.
