= History of beer =

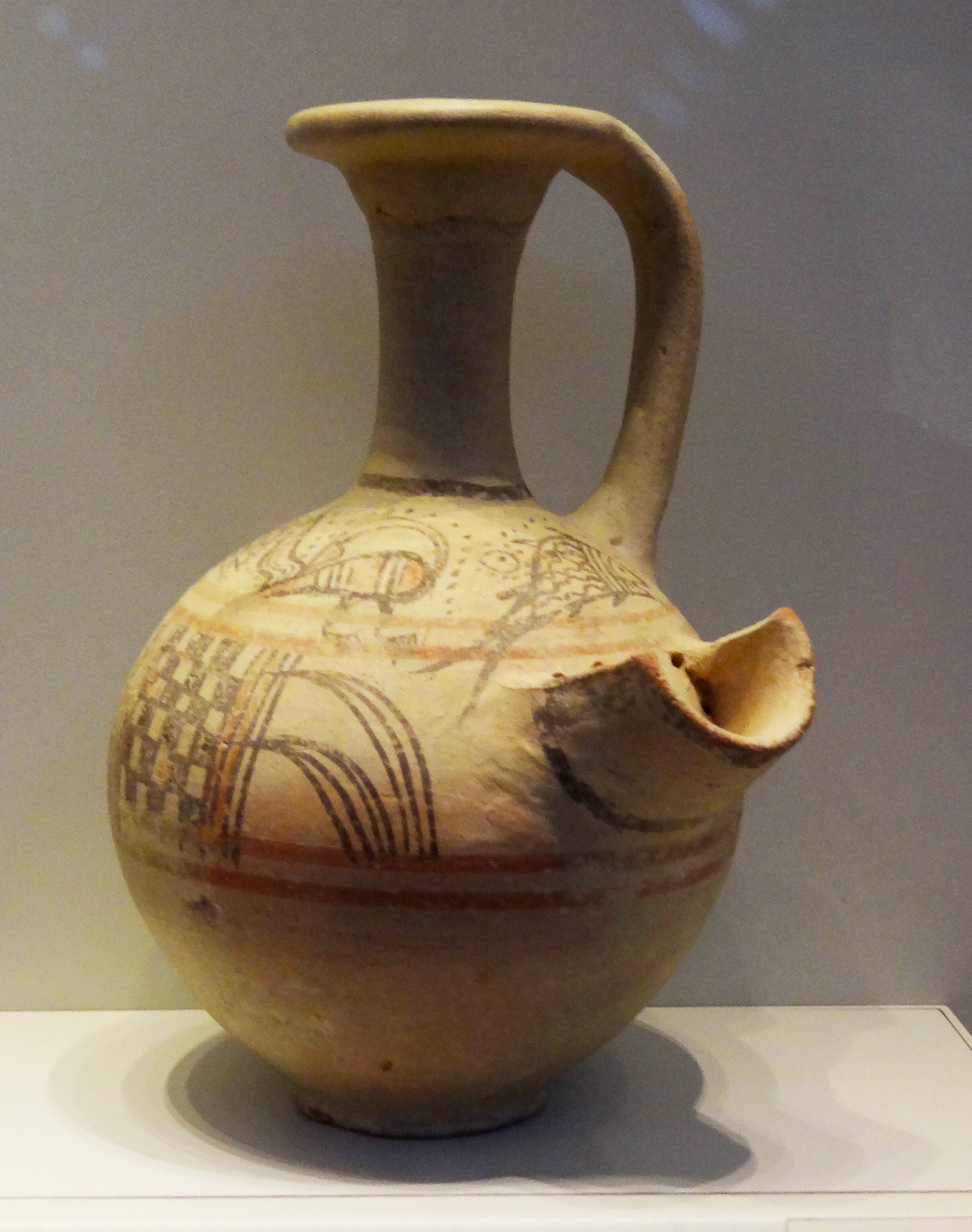
Philistine pottery beer jug

Beer is one of the oldest human-produced drinks. The written history of ancient Egypt and Mesopotamia records the use of beer, and the drink eventually spread throughout the world. A 3,900-year-old Sumerian poem honouring Ninkasi, the patron goddess of brewing, contains the oldest surviving beer-recipe, describing the production of beer from barley bread. In China, residue on pottery dating from around 5,000 years ago shows that beer was brewed using barley and other grains.

The development of bread and beer led to the creation of technology and static civilization.

Beer was known in Neolithic Europe as far back as 5,000 years ago. Beer produced before the Industrial Revolution continued to be made and sold on a domestic scale, although by the 7th century CE beer was also being produced and sold by European monasteries. During the Industrial Revolution, the production of beer moved from artisanal manufacture to industrial manufacture, and domestic manufacture ceased to be significant by the end of the 19th century. The development of hydrometers and thermometers changed brewing by allowing the brewer more control of the process, and giving greater knowledge of the brewing product.

Today, the brewing industry is a global business, consisting of several multinational companies and many thousands of smaller producers ranging from brewpubs to regional breweries. More than 133 billion liters (35 billion gallons) of beer are sold per year – producing total global revenues of $294.5 billion (£147.7 billion) in 2006. The global beer market is projected to grow by $148.43 billion between 2024 and 2028, according to a report by Technavio.

== Early beers ==
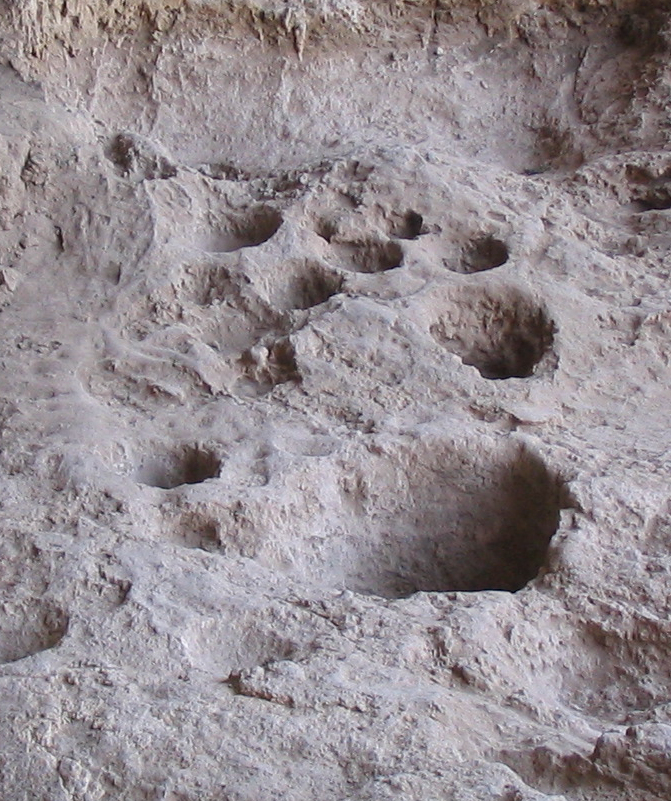
Rock mortars in Raqefet Cave, used to make beer during the Stone Age.

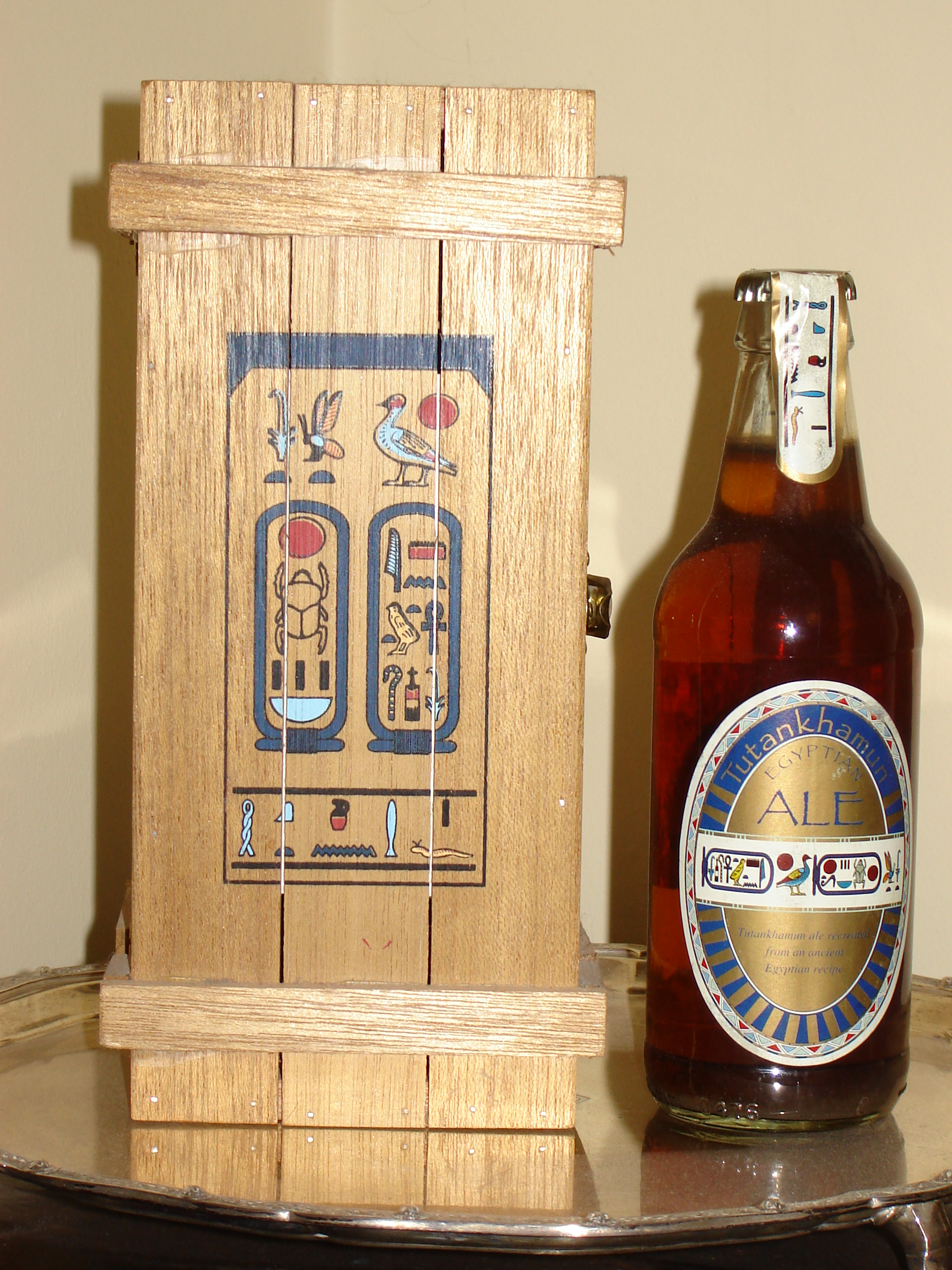
A replica of ancient Egyptian beer, brewed from emmer wheat by the Courage brewery in 1996

As almost any cereal containing certain sugars can undergo spontaneous fermentation due to wild yeasts in the air, it is possible that beer-like drinks were independently developed throughout the world soon after a tribe or culture had domesticated cereal. Chemical tests of ancient pottery jars reveal that beer was produced about 3,500 BCE in what is today Iran, and was one of the first-known biological engineering tasks where the biological process of fermentation is used; the earliest chemically confirmed barley beer to date was discovered at Godin Tepe in the central Zagros Mountains of Iran, where fragments of a jug, from between 5,400 and 5,000 years ago was found to be coated with beerstone, a by-product of the brewing process.

Archaeological findings also show that Chinese villagers were brewing fermented alcoholic drinks as far back as 7000 BCE on small and individual scale, with the production process and methods similar to that of ancient Egypt and ancient Mesopotamia.

The process by which the production of beer was discovered is a matter of debate.

Author Thomas Sinclair says in his book, "Beer, Bread, and the Seeds of Change: Agriculture's Imprint on World History" that the discovery of beer may have been an accidental find. The precursor to beer was soaking grains in water and making a porridge or gruel, as grain was chewy and hard to digest alone. Ancient peoples would heat the gruel and leave it throughout the days until it was gone. A benefit to heating the gruel would be to sanitize the water and the temperature required to denature grain proteins would also denature disease microbes. Leaving the gruel to sit would change it. Fermentation would occur and they noticed the change in taste and effect. Yeasts would settle on the mixture and rapidly consume the oxygen in the mixture. The low oxygen would then cause the yeast to digest sugars by anaerobic respiration, which causes the release of ethanol (alcohol) and carbon dioxide as by-products and, hence, beer was born.

The earliest archaeological evidence of fermentation consists of 13,000-year-old residues of a beer with the consistency of gruel, used by the semi-nomadic Natufians for ritual feasting, at the Raqefet Cave in the Carmel Mountains near Haifa in Israel.

The first written records of brewing come from Mesopotamia (ancient Iraq). These include early evidence of beer in the 3,900-year-old Sumerian poem honoring Ninkasi, the patron goddess of brewing, which contains the oldest surviving beer recipe, describing the production of beer from barley via bread.

"Ninkasi, you are the one who pours out the filtered beer of the collector vat... It is [like] the onrush of Tigris and Euphrates."

Approximately 5,000 years ago, workers in the city of Uruk were paid by their employers in beer. Beer is also mentioned in the Epic of Gilgamesh, in which the 'wild man' Enkidu is given beer to drink. "... he ate until he was full, drank seven pitchers of beer, his heart grew light, his face glowed and he sang out with joy."

In February 2019, archaeologists from Mola Headland Infrastructure and experts from Highways England found evidence of first Iron Age beer dated back over 2,000 years during road works in Cambridgeshire. In February 2021, archaeologists found a 5,000-old beer factory in Abydos, Egypt, dating back to the reign of King Narmer, Early Dynastic Period.

Confirmed written evidence of ancient beer production in Armenia can be obtained from Ancient Greek philosopher Xenophon in his work Anabasis (5th century BCE) when he was in one of the ancient Armenian villages in which he wrote:

There were stores within of wheat and barley and vegetables, and wine made from barley in great big bowls; the grains of barley malt lay floating in the beverage up to the lip of the vessel, and reeds lay in them, some longer, some shorter, without joints; when you were thirsty you must take one of these into your mouth, and suck. The beverage without admixture of water was very strong, and of a delicious flavour to certain palates, but the taste must be acquired.

Beer became vital to all the grain-growing civilizations of Eurasian and North African antiquity, including Egypt – so much so that in 1868 James Death put forward a theory in The Beer of the Bible that the manna from heaven that God gave the Israelites was a bread-based, porridge-like beer called wusa.

These beers were often thick, more of a gruel than a drink, and drinking straws were used by the Sumerians to avoid the bitter solids left over from fermentation. Though beer was drunk in Ancient Rome, it was replaced in popularity by wine. Tacitus wrote disparagingly of the beer brewed by the Germanic peoples of his day. Thracians were also known to consume beer made from rye, even since the 5th century BCE, as the ancient Greek logographer Hellanicus of Lesbos says. Their name for beer was brutos, or brytos. The Romans called their brew cerevisia, from the Celtic word for it. Beer was apparently enjoyed by some Roman legionaries. For instance, among the Vindolanda tablets (from Vindolanda in Roman Britain, dated c. 97–103 CE), the cavalry decurion Masculus wrote a letter to prefect Flavius Cerialis inquiring about the exact instructions for his men for the following day. This included a polite request for beer to be sent to the garrison (which had entirely consumed its previous stock of beer).

Ancient Nubians had used beer as an antibiotic medicine.

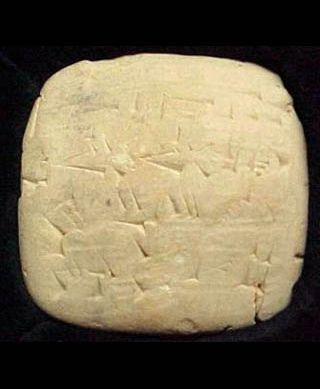
Alulu beer receipt recording a purchase of "best" beer from a brewer, c. 2050 BCE, from the Sumerian city of Umma in ancient Iraq.

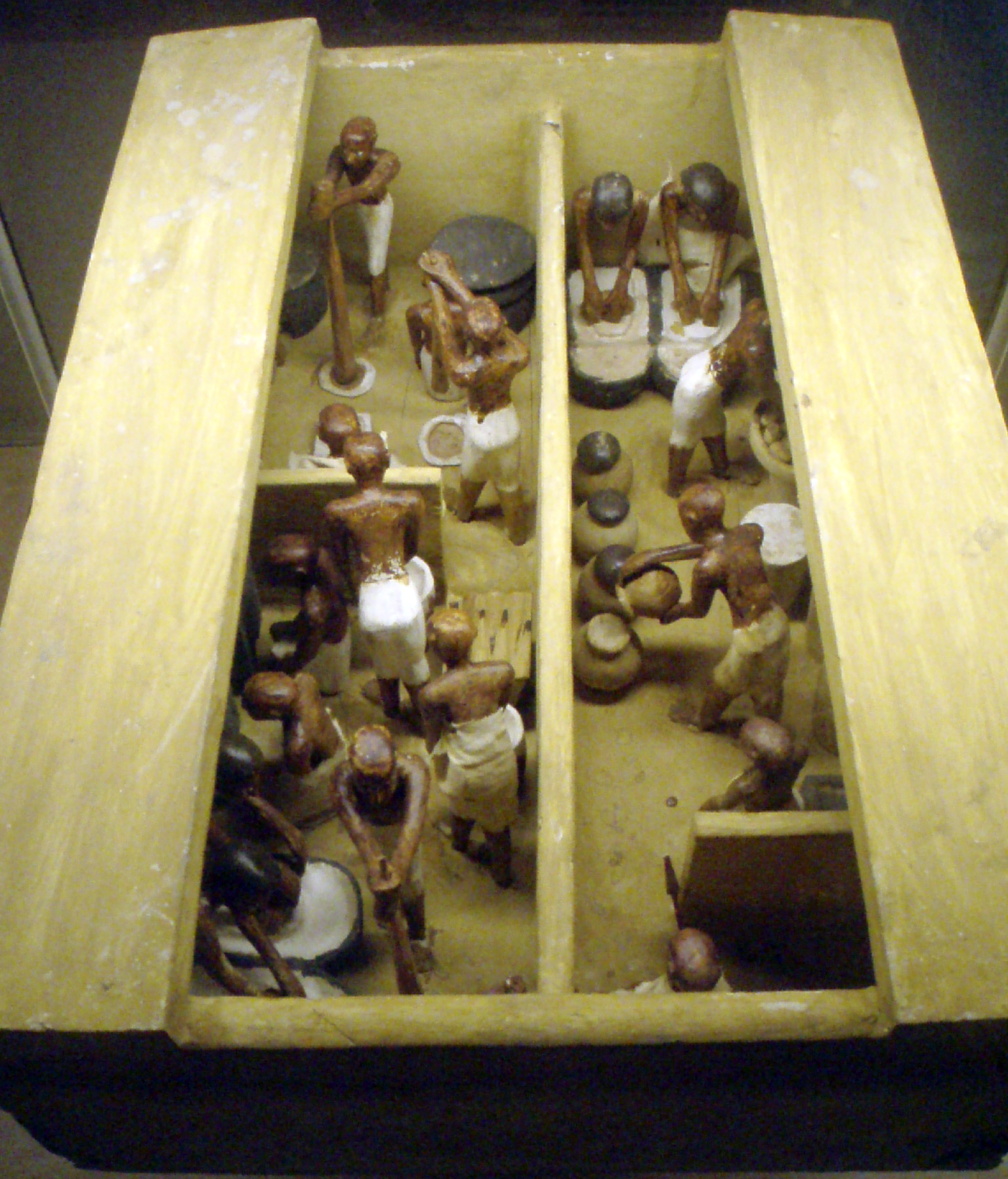
A funerary model of a bakery and brewery, from the Eleventh dynasty of Egypt, c. 2009–1998 BCE

In ancient Mesopotamia, clay tablets indicate that the majority of brewers were probably women, and that brewing was a fairly well respected occupation during the time, being the only profession in Mesopotamia which derived social sanction and divine protection from female deities/goddesses, specifically: Ninkasi, who covered the production of beer, Siris, who was used in a metonymic way to refer to beer, and Siduri, who covered the enjoyment of beer. Mesopotamian brewing appears to have incorporated the usage of a twice-baked barley bread called bappir, which was exclusively used for brewing beer. It was discovered early that reusing the same container for fermenting the mash would produce more reliable results; brewers on the move carried their tubs with them.

The Ebla tablets, discovered in 1974 in Ebla, Syria, show that beer was produced in the city in 2500 BCE. Early traces of beer and the brewing process have been found in ancient Babylonia as well. At the time, brewers were women as well, but also priestesses. Some types of beers were used especially in religious ceremonies. In 2100 BCE, the Babylonian king Hammurabi included regulations governing tavern keepers in his law code for the kingdom.

In Ancient India, the Vedas and Ramayana mention a beer-like drink called sura consumed during the Vedic Period (c. 1500 – c. 500 BCE). It was the favourite of the god Indra. Kautilya has also mentioned two intoxicating beverages made from rice called Medaka and Prasanna.

Beer was part of the daily diet of Egyptian pharaohs over 5,000 years ago. Then, it was made from baked barley bread, and was also used in religious practices. During the building of the Great Pyramids in Giza, Egypt, each worker got a daily ration of four to five liters of beer, which served as both nutrition and refreshment that was crucial to the pyramids' construction.

The Greek writer Sophocles (450 BCE) discussed the concept of moderation when it came to consuming beer in Greek culture, and believed that the best diet for Greeks consisted of bread, meats, various types of vegetables, and beer or "ζῦθος" (zythos) as they called it. The ancient Greeks also made barleywine (Greek: "κρίθινος οἶνος" – krithinos oinos, "barley wine") mentioned by Greek historian Polybius in his work The Histories, where he states that Phaeacians kept barleywine in silver and golden kraters.

During the £1.5bn upgrade of the A14 in Cambridgeshire, evidence was found that beer was brewed in Britain more than 2,000 years ago. Steve Sherlock, the Highways England archaeology lead for the A14 project said, "It's a well-known fact that ancient populations used the beer-making process to purify water and create a safe source of hydration, but this is potentially the earliest physical evidence of that process taking place in the UK." Roger Protz, the former editor of the Campaign for Real Ale's Good Beer Guide, said, "When the Romans invaded Britain they found the local tribes brewing a type of beer called curmi."

In Europe during the Middle Ages, a brewers' guild might adopt a patron saint of brewing. Arnulf of Metz (c. 582–640) and Arnulf of Oudenburg (c. 1040–1087) were recognized by some French and Flemish brewers. Belgian brewers, too, venerated Arnulf of Oudenburg (aka Arnold of Soissons), who is also recognized as the patron saint of hop-pickers. Christian monks built breweries, to provide food, drink, and shelter to travelers and pilgrims.

Charlemagne, Frankish king and ruler of the Holy Roman Empire during the 8th century, considered beer to be an important part of living, and is often thought to have trained some brewers himself.

== Medieval Europe ==
Beer was one of the most common drinks during the Middle Ages. It was consumed daily by all social classes in the northern and eastern parts of Europe where grape cultivation was difficult or impossible, and brewing it was considered a common household task, orchestrated by women. Though wine of varying qualities was the most common drink in the south, beer was still popular among the lower classes. The idea that beer was consumed more commonly than water during medieval times is considered by some historians to be a myth. Though probably one of the most popular drinks in Europe, beer was frequently disdained as being unhealthy, possibly because ancient Greek and more contemporary Arab physicians had little or no experience with the drink. In 1256, the Aldobrandino of Siena described the nature of beer in the following way:

But from whichever it is made, whether from oats, barley or wheat, it harms the head and the stomach, it causes bad breath and ruins the teeth, it fills the stomach with bad fumes, and as a result anyone who drinks it along with wine becomes drunk quickly; but it does have the property of facilitating urination and makes one's flesh white and smooth.

In 822, the Carolingian Abbot Adalard of Corbie wrote about the use of hops in beer. Flavoring beer with hops was known at least since the 9th century, but was only gradually adopted because of difficulties in establishing the right proportions of ingredients. Before that, gruit, a mix of various herbs, had been used, but did not have the same preserving properties as hops. Beer flavored without hops was often spoiled soon after preparation and could not be exported. The only other alternative was to increase the alcohol content, which was rather expensive. Hopped beer was perfected in the medieval towns of Bohemia by the 13th century. German towns pioneered a new scale of operation with standardized barrel sizes that allowed for large-scale export. Previously beer had been brewed at home, but the production was now successfully replaced by medium-sized operations of about eight to ten people. This type of production spread to Holland in the 14th century and later to Flanders and Brabant, and reached England by the late 15th century.

English ale and beer brewing were carried out separately, no brewer being allowed to produce both. The Brewers Company of London stated "no hops, herbs, or other like thing be put into any ale or liquore wherof ale shall be made – but only liquor (water), malt, and yeast." This comment is sometimes misquoted as a prohibition on hopped beer. However, hopped beer was opposed by some:

Ale is made of malte and water; and they the which do put any other thynge to ale than is rehersed, except yest, barme, or goddesgood [three words for yeast], doth sophysticat there ale. Ale for an Englysshe man is a naturall drinke. Ale muste haue these properties, it muste be fresshe and cleare, it muste not be ropy, nor smoky, nor it must haue no wefte nor tayle. Ale shulde not be dronke vnder .v. dayes olde .... Barly malte maketh better ale than Oten malte or any other corne doth ... Beere is made of malte, of hoppes, and water; it is a naturall drynke for a doche [Dutch] man, and nowe of late dayes it is moche vsed in Englande to the detryment of many Englysshe men ... for the drynke is a colde drynke. Yet it doth make a man fatte, and doth inflate the bely, as it doth appere by the doche mennes faces and belyes.

== Early modern Europe ==
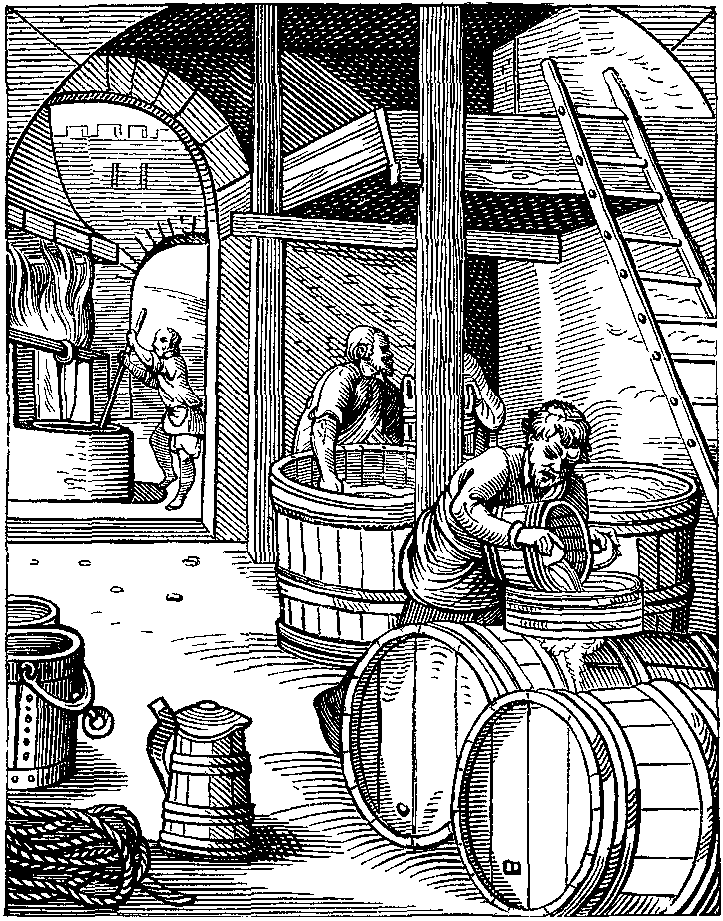
A 16th-century brewery

In Europe, beer brewing largely remained a home activity in medieval times. By the 14th and 15th centuries, beermaking was gradually changing from a family-oriented activity to an artisan one, with taverns and monasteries brewing their own beer for mass consumption.

In the late Middle Ages, the brewing industry in northern Europe changed from a small-scale domestic industry to a large-scale export industry. The key innovation was the introduction of hops, which began in northern Germany in the 13th century. Hops sharply improved both the brewing process and the quality of beer. Other innovations from German lands involved larger kettle sizes and more frequent brewing. Consumption went up, while brewing became more concentrated because it was a capital-intensive industry. Thus in Hamburg per capita consumption increased from an average of 300 liters per year in the 15th century to about 700 in the 17th century.

The use of hops spread to the Netherlands and then to England. In 15th century England, an unhopped beer would have been known as an ale, while the use of hops would make it a beer. Hopped beer was imported to England from the Netherlands as early as 1400 in Winchester, and hops were being planted on the island by 1428. The popularity of hops was at first mixed—the Brewers Company of London went so far as to state "no hops, herbs, or other like thing be put into any ale or liquore wherof ale shall be made – but only liquor (water), malt, and yeast."

However, by the 16th century, ale had come to refer to any strong beer, and all ales and beers were hopped, giving rise to the verse noted by the antiquary John Aubrey:

Greeke, Heresie, Turkey-cocks and Beer

Came into England all in a year.

the year, according to Aubrey, being the fifteenth of Henry VIII (1524).

In 1516, William IV, Duke of Bavaria, adopted the Reinheitsgebot (purity law), perhaps the oldest food regulation still in use through the 20th century (the Reinheitsgebot passed formally from German law in 1987). The Gebot ordered that the ingredients of beer be restricted to water, barley, and hops; yeast was added to the list after Louis Pasteur's discovery in 1857. The Bavarian law was applied throughout Germany as part of the 1871 German unification as the German Empire under Otto von Bismarck, and has since been updated to reflect modern trends in beer brewing. To this day, the Gebot is considered a mark of purity in beers, although this is controversial.

Most beers until relatively recent times were top-fermented. Bottom-fermented beers were discovered by accident in the 16th century after beer was stored in cool caverns for long periods; they have since largely outpaced top-fermented beers in terms of volume. For further discussion of bottom-fermented beers, see Pilsner and Lager.

== Asia ==
=== China ===
Documented evidence and recently excavated tombs indicate that the Chinese brewed alcoholic drinks from both malted grain and grain converted by mold from prehistoric times, but that the malt conversion process was largely considered inefficient in comparison with the use of molds specially cultivated on rice carrier (the resulting molded rice being called 酒麴 (Jiǔ qū) in Chinese and Koji in Japanese) to convert cooked rice into fermentable sugars, both in the amount of resulting fermentable sugars and the residual by products (the Chinese use the dregs left after fermenting the rice, called 酒糟 (Jiǔzāo), as a cooking ingredient in many dishes, frequently as an ingredient to sauces where Western dishes would use wine), because the rice undergoes starch conversion after being hulled and cooked, rather than whole and in husks like barley malt. Furthermore, the hop plant being unknown in East Asia, malt-based alcoholic drinks did not preserve well over time, and the use of malt in the production of alcoholic drinks gradually fell out of favor in China until disappearing from Chinese history by the end of the Tang dynasty. The use of rice became dominant, such that wines from fruits of any type were historically all but unknown except as imports in China.

The production of alcoholic drink from cooked rice converted by microbes continues to this day, and some classify the different varieties of Chinese 米酒 (Mǐjiǔ) and Japanese sake as beer since they are made from converted starch rather than fruit sugars. However, this is a debatable point, and such drinks are generally referred to as "rice wine" or "sake" which is really the generic Chinese and Japanese word for all alcoholic drinks.

The earliest evidence of beer-making in China is from around 5,000 years ago at the Mijiaya site.

=== Other ===
Some Pacific island cultures ferment starch that has been converted to fermentable sugars by human saliva, similar to the chicha of South America. This practice is also used by many other tribes around the world, who either chew the grain and then spit it into the fermentation vessel or spit into a fermentation vessel containing cooked grain, which is then sealed up for the fermentation. Enzymes in the spittle convert the starch into fermentable sugars, which are fermented by wild yeast. Whether or not the resulting product can be called beer is sometimes disputed, since:

1. As with Asian rice-based liquors, it does not involve malting.
2. This method is often used with starches derived from sources other than grain, such as yams, taro, or other such root vegetables.

Some Taiwanese tribes have taken the process a step further by distilling the resulting alcoholic drink, resulting in a clear liquor. However, as none of the Taiwanese tribes are known to have developed systems of writing, there is no way to document how far back this practice goes, or if the technique was brought from mainland China by Han Chinese immigrants. Judging by the fact that this technique is usually found in tribes using millet (a grain native to northern China) as the ingredient, the latter seems much more likely.

Asia's first brewery was incorporated in 1855 (although it was established earlier) by Edward Dyer at Kasauli in the Himalayan Mountains in India under the name Dyer Breweries. The company still exists and is known as Mohan Meakin, today comprising a large group of companies across many industries.

== The Industrial Revolution ==
=== Technical innovations ===
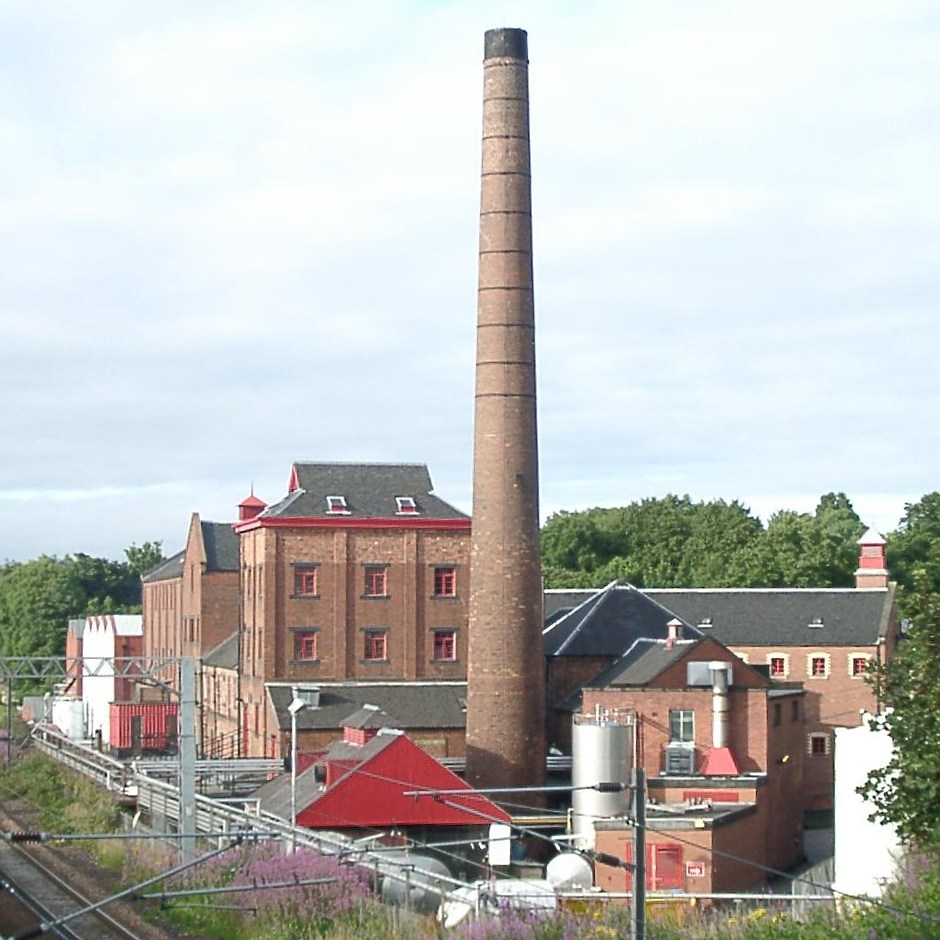
The Caledonian Brewery, founded in 1869, Edinburgh, Scotland

Following significant improvements in the efficiency of the steam engine in 1765, industrialization of beer became a reality. Further innovations in the brewing process came about with the introduction of the thermometer in 1760 and hydrometer in 1770, which allowed brewers to increase efficiency and attenuation.

Prior to the late 18th century, malt was primarily dried over fires made from wood, charcoal, or straw, and after 1600, from coke.

In general, none of these early malts would have been well shielded from the smoke involved in the kilning process, and consequently, early beers would have had a smoky component to their flavors; evidence indicates that maltsters and brewers constantly tried to minimize the smokiness of the finished beer.

Writers of the period describe the distinctive taste derived from wood-smoked malts, and the almost universal revulsion it engendered. The smoked beers and ales of the West Country were famous for being undrinkable – locals and the desperate excepted. This is from "Directions for Brewing Malt Liquors" (1700):

In most parts of the West, their malt is so stenched with the Smoak of the Wood, with which 'tis dryed, that no Stranger can endure it, though the inhabitants, who are familiarized to it, can swallow it as the Hollanders do their thick Black Beer Brewed with Buck Wheat.

An even earlier reference to such malt was recorded by William Harrison, in his "Description of England", 1577:

In some places it [malt] is dried at leisure with wood alone, or straw alone, in other with wood and straw together, but, of all, the straw-dried is the most excellent. For the wood-dried malt, when it is brewed, beside that the drink is higher of colour, it doth hurt and annoy the head of him that is not used thereto, because of the smoke. Such also as use both indifferently do bark, cleave, and dry their wood in an oven, thereby to remove all moisture that should procure the fume ...

"London and Country Brewer" (1736) specified the varieties of "brown malt" popular in the city:

Brown Malts are dryed with Straw, Wood and Fern, etc. The straw-dryed is the best, but the wood sort has a most unnatural Taste, that few can bear with, but the necessitous, and those that are accustomed to its strong smoaky tang; yet it is much used in some of the Western Parts of England, and many thousand Quarters of this malt has been formerly used in London for brewing the Butt-keeoing-beers with, and that because it sold for two shillings per Quarter cheaper than Straw-dryed Malt, nor was this Quality of the Wood-dryed Malt much regarded by some of its Brewers, for that its ill Taste is lost in nine or twelve Months, by the Age of the Beer, and the strength of the great Quantity of Hops that were used in its preservation.

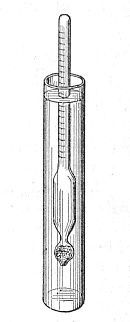
A hydrometer measures beer's specific gravity

The hydrometer transformed how beer was brewed. Before its introduction beers were brewed from a single malt: brown beers from brown malt, amber beers from amber malt, pale beers from pale malt. Using the hydrometer, brewers could calculate the yield from different malts. They observed that pale malt, though more expensive, yielded far more fermentable material than cheaper malts. For example, brown malt (used for Porter) gave 54 pounds of extract per quarter, whilst pale malt gave 80 pounds. Once this was known, brewers switched to using mostly pale malt for all beers supplemented with a small quantity of highly coloured malt to achieve the correct colour for darker beers.

The invention of the drum roaster in 1817 by Daniel Wheeler allowed for the creation of very dark, roasted malts, contributing to the flavour of porters and stouts. Its development was prompted by a British law of 1816 forbidding the use of any ingredients other than malt and hops. Porter brewers, employing a predominantly pale malt grist, urgently needed a legal colorant. Wheeler's patent malt was the solution.

Louis Pasteur's 1857 discovery of yeast's role in fermentation led to the development of methods to prevent the souring of beer by undesirable microorganisms.

=== Bottling ===
Fragile hand-blown glass bottles began to be made in England in the late 16th century. Secondary fermentation often caused them to burst. By 1691, they had improved enough for the merchant Thomas Tryon to comment that bottled beer kept longer than beer in barrels. Mass production of bottles by casting in moulds began in the late 19th century. The metal screw-top was invented in 1879. Brown bottles that protected the beer from spoilage by sunlight were favoured by many brewers. By 1945, the majority of beer was bottled, only to be overtaken by canned beer later in the 20th century.

== Modern beer ==
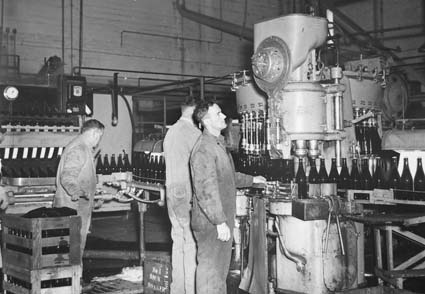
Bottling beer in a modern facility, 1945, Australia

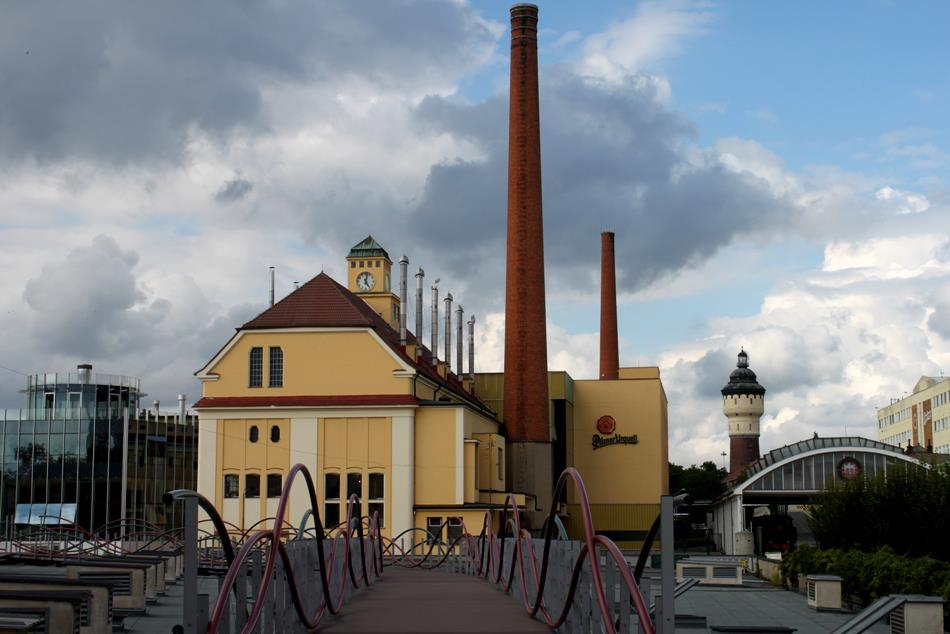
Traditional fermenting building (center) and modern fermenting building (left) in Pilsner Urquell Brewery (Czech Republic)

Many European nations have unbroken brewing traditions dating back to the earliest historical records. Beer is an especially important drink in countries such as Belgium, Germany, Austria, Ireland, the UK (England, Wales, Scotland and Northern Ireland), France, the Scandinavian countries, Poland, the Czech Republic, Spain and others having strong and unique brewing traditions with their own history, characteristic brewing methods, and styles of beer.

Unlike in many parts of the world, there is a significant market in Europe (the UK in particular) for beer containing live yeast. These unfiltered, unpasteurised brews are more challenging to handle than the commonly sold "dead" beers; "live" beer quality can suffer with poor care, but many people prefer its taste. While beer is usually matured for relatively short times (a few weeks to a few months) compared to wine, some of the stronger so-called real ales have been found to develop character and flavour over the course of as much as several decades.

World beer consumption per capita

In some parts of the world, breweries that had begun as a family business by Germans or other European émigrés grew into large companies, often passing into hands with more concern for profits than traditions of quality, resulting in a degradation of the product.

In 1953, New Zealander Morton Coutts developed the technique of continuous fermentation. Coutts patented his process, which involves beer flowing through sealed tanks, fermenting under pressure, and never coming into contact with the atmosphere, even when bottled. His process was introduced in the US and UK, but is now used for commercial beer production only in New Zealand.

In some sectors brewers are reluctant to embrace new technology for fear of losing the traditional characteristics of their beer. For example, Marston's Brewery in Burton on Trent still uses open wooden Burton Union sets for fermentation in order to maintain the quality and flavour of its beers, while Belgium's lambic brewers go so far as to expose their brews to outside air in order to pick up the natural wild yeasts which ferment the wort. Traditional brewing techniques protect the beer from oxidation by maintaining a carbon dioxide blanket over the wort as it ferments into beer.

Modern breweries now brew many types of beer, ranging from ancient styles such as the spontaneously fermented lambics of Belgium; the lagers, dark beers, wheat beers and more of Germany; the UK's stouts, milds, pale ales, bitters, golden ale and new modern American creations such as chili beer, cream ale, and double India pale ales.

Today, the brewpubs regional breweries are only a few of the thousands of smaller businesses that make up vast worldwide brewing industry today. The global beer market has grown as a result of advancements in refrigeration, international and transcontinental shipping, marketing and trade. because of this consumers can choose from variety of beers made locally, regionally, nationally, and internationally that reflect various brewing traditions and style.

=== Beer in the United States ===
Prior to 1920 there were thousands of breweries in the United States. Typically they brewed heavier beers than modern US beer drinkers are used to. Beginning with nationwide Prohibition in 1920, most of these breweries went out of business, although some converted to soft drinks and other businesses. Bootlegged beer was often watered down to increase profits, beginning a trend, still on-going today, of the heavily promoting the weaker beers and keeping them popular. Consolidation of breweries and the application of industrial quality control standards have led to the mass-production and the mass-marketing of huge quantities of light lagers. Advertising became supreme, and bigger companies fared better in that market. The decades after World War II saw a consolidation of the American brewing industry: brewing companies would buy their rivals solely for their customers and distribution systems, shutting down their brewing operations.

Despite the record increases in production between 1870 and 1895, the number of firms fell by 46%. Average brewery output rose significantly, driven partly by a rapid increase in output by the largest breweries. As late as 1877, only four breweries topped 100,000 barrels annually. By 1895, the largest sixteen firms had greatly increased their productive capacity and were all brewing over 250,000 barrels annually; and imports have become more abundant since the mid-1980s. The number of breweries has been claimed as being either over 1,500 in 2007 or over 1,400 in 2010, depending on the source. As of June 2013, The Brewers Association reports the total number of currently operating US breweries to be 2,538, with all but 55 of those being craft breweries.

== Mythology ==
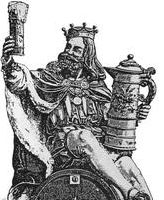
Gambrinus – king of beer

The Finnish epic Kalevala, collected in written form in the 19th century but based on oral traditions many centuries old, devotes more lines to the origin of beer and brewing than it does to the origin of mankind.

The mythical Flemish king Gambrinus (from Jan Primus (John I)), is sometimes credited with the invention of beer.

According to Czech legend, deity Radegast, god of hospitality, invented beer.

Ninkasi was the patron goddess of brewing in ancient Sumer.

In Egyptian mythology, the immense blood-lust of the fierce lioness goddess Sekhmet was only sated after she was tricked into consuming an extremely large amount of red-coloured beer (believing it to be blood): she became so drunk that she gave up slaughter altogether and became docile.

In Norse mythology the sea god Ægir, his wife Rán, and their nine daughters, brewed ale (or mead) for the gods. In the Lokasenna, it is told that Ægir would host a party where all the gods would drink the beer he brewed for them. He made this in a giant kettle that Thor had brought. The cups in Ægir's hall were always full, magically refilling themselves when emptied. Ægir had two servants in his hall to assist him; Eldir [Fire-Kindler] and Fimafeng [Handy].

In Nart sagas, Satanaya (Ubykh [satanaja], Adyghe [setenej], Ossetian [ʃatana]), the mother of the Narts, a fertility figure and matriarch, invented beer.

Recent Irish Mythology attributes the invention of beer to fabled Irishman Charlie Mops

== Etymology ==
The word beer comes from old Germanic languages, and is with variations used in continental Germanic languages, bier in German and Dutch, but not in Nordic languages. The word was imported into the British Isles by tribes such as the Saxons. It is disputed where the word originally comes from.

Many other languages have borrowed the Dutch/German word, such as French bière, Italian birra, Romanian "bere" and Turkish bira. The Nordic languages have öl/øl, related to the English word ale. Spanish, Portuguese and Catalan have words that evolved from Latin cervisia, originally of Celtic origin. Slavic languages use pivo with small variations, based on a pre-Slavic word meaning "drink" and derived from the verb meaning "to drink".

Chuvash "pora" its r-Turkic counterpart, which may ultimately be the source of the Germanic beer-word.

== See also ==
- Alewife
- Food history
- Jofroi of Waterford, a Paris-based Dominican who about 1300 wrote a catalogue of all the known wines and ales of Europe, describing them with great relish, and recommending them to academics and counselors.
- Sahti
- Women in brewing

== Bibliography ==
- Apps, Jerry (2005). Breweries of Wisconsin. University of Wisconsin Press. ISBN 9780299206543.
- Arnold, John Paul (2005) [1911]. Origin and History of Beer and Brewing: From Prehistoric Times to the Beginning of Brewing Science and Technology: a Critical Essay. BeerBooks. ISBN 9780966208412.
- Benn, Charles (2002). China's Golden Age: Everyday Life in the Tang Dynasty. Oxford University Press. ISBN 0-19-517665-0.
- Corran, Henry Stanley (1975). A history of brewing. David & Charles. ISBN 9780715367353.
- Dumper, Michael; Stanley, Bruce E. (2007). Cities of the Middle East and North Africa: A Historical Encyclopedia. ABC-CLIO. ISBN 978-1-57607-919-5.
- Eames, Alan D. (1995). Secret Life of Beer: Legends, Lore & Little-Known Facts. Storey Communications. ISBN 0-88266-807-2.
- Elzinga, Kenneth G.; Tremblay, Carol Horton; Tremblay, Victor J. (2015). "Craft beer in the United States: History, numbers, and geography". Journal of Wine Economics. 10 (3): 242–274. doi:10.1017/jwe.2015.22.
- Fahey, David M. (2009). "Old-Time Breweries: Academic and Breweriana Historians". Ohio History. 116 (1): 101–121. doi:10.1353/ohh.0.0062.
- Glick, Thomas; Livesey, Steven J.; Wallis, Faith, eds. (2005). Medieval science, technology, and medicine: an encyclopedia. Routledge. ISBN 0-415-96930-1.
- Hornsey, Ian Spencer (2003). A history of beer and brewing. Royal Society of Chemistry. ISBN 9780854046300.
- King, Frank A. (1947). Beer has a history. Hutchinson's Scientific and Technical Publications.
- Mittelman, Amy (2008). Brewing battles: A history of American beer. Algora Publishing. ISBN 9780875865744.
- Muraresku, Brian C. (2020). The Immortality Key: The Secret History of the Religion with No Name. Macmillan USA. ISBN 978-1-250-20714-2.
- Nelson, Max (2005). The Barbarian's Beverage: A History of Beer in Ancient Europe. Taylor & Francis. ISBN 9781134386710.
- Oliver, Garrett; Colicchio, Tom, eds. (2011). The Oxford Companion to Beer. Oxford University Press. ISBN 9780199912100.
- Patterson, Mark; Hoalst-Pullen, Nancy, eds. (2014). The geography of beer: Regions, environment, and societies. Springer Science & Business Media. ISBN 9789400777873.
- Paulette, Tate (2024). In the Land of Ninkasi: A History of Beer in Ancient Mesopotamia. Oxford University Press. ISBN 9780197682449.
- Scully, Terence (1995). The Art of Cookery in the Middle Ages. Boydell Press. ISBN 0-85115-611-8.
- Smith, Gregg (1995). Beer: A History of Suds and Civilization from Mesopotamia to Microbreweries. Avon Books. ISBN 9780380780518.
- Unger, Richard W. (1992). "Technical Change in the Brewing Industry in Germany, the Low Countries, and England in the Late Middle Ages". Journal of European Economic History. 21 (2): 281–313.
- Unger, Richard W. (2004). Beer in the Middle Ages and the Renaissance. University of Pennsylvania Press. ISBN 0-8122-3795-1.
