= Baltimore Whore =

Baltimore Whore may refer to:

- Martin B-26 Marauder bomber aircraft
- "Baltimore Whores", song on first disk of compilation album Rogue's Gallery: Pirate Ballads, Sea_Songs, and Chanteys
