= Akvavit =

Flavored Scandinavian spirit

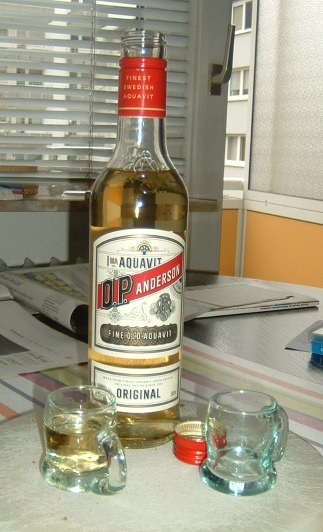
A bottle of "O.P. Anderson", a Swedish akvavit.

Akvavit or aquavit (/ˈɑːkwəviːt, -və-/) is a distilled spirit that is principally produced in Scandinavia, where it has been produced since the 15th century. Akvavit is distilled from grain or potatoes and is flavoured with a variety of spices and herbs. It is also popular in Northern Germany.

Akvavit gets its distinctive flavour from spices and herbs, and the dominant flavour must (according to the European Union) come from a distillate of caraway and/or dill seed. It typically contains 40% alcohol by volume, or 80 proof (U.S.). The EU has established a minimum of 37.5% ABV for akvavit to be called that.

== Etymology ==
The word aquavit derives from the Latin aqua vitae, "water of life." Compare the words whisky and whiskey, from Gaelic uisce beatha, which has the same meaning. Likewise, clear fruit brandy is called eau de vie (French for "water of life").

== Drinking culture ==
Akvavit is an important part of Nordic drinking culture, where it is often had during festive gatherings, such as Christmas dinners and the Midsummer celebration, often as an aperitif. In Iceland, Sweden, Denmark, and Germany, aquavit is sometimes chilled and drunk in a single gulp from a small shot glass. This is usually attributed to tradition. In Norway, it is generally not chilled, but enjoyed slowly to experience the herbal flavours. In Sweden, aquavit is commonly consumed immediately following a song, called a snapsvisa. The most well-known song is "Helan Går". In Finland and Sweden, aquavit consumed from a shot glass is also commonly associated with crayfish parties, which are traditionally held during late August. In Denmark, aquavit is called snaps or akvavit and is primarily consumed in December during Christmas lunches or around Easter. It is consumed year-round, though mainly with lunches of traditional Danish dishes, where beer is also always on the table. In Norway, where most aquavit is matured in oak casks, the drink is served at room temperature in tulip-shaped glasses. Aquavit arguably complements beer well, and its consumption is very often preceded by a swig of beer.

== Production ==
Akvavit must be distilled from an agricultural base, most commonly grain or potatoes. Similarly to gin, it is flavoured with botanicals. The dominant flavours must be caraway or dill, or sometimes both. Swedish Akvavit must also contain fennel to be labelled as such. Other common botanicals include cardamom, cumin, anise, and coriander. The Danish distillery Aalborg makes an akvavit distilled with amber, which imparts a pine-like citrusy note. The Aalborg brand is now produced in Norway by Arcus Group.

Recipes and flavours differ between brands, with each brand's unique characteristics coming from distillation methods and the supporting botanicals in its blends. Un-aged Akvavit is clear, while aged Akvavit typically has a pale straw-to-golden hue, depending on how long it has been aged in oak casks (most common in Norway) or how much colourant is used. Normally, a darker colour suggests a higher age or the use of young casks, although artificial caramel colouring and infusing fruits or botanicals for colour and flavour are permitted before bottling. Clear akvavit is often called taffel, meaning table aquavit. Taffel aquavit is typically aged in old casks that do not colour the finished spirit, or it is not aged at all.

== Origin and traditional variants ==
Dear lord, will your grace know that I send your grace some water with messenger Jon Teiste which is called Aqua vite and the same water helps for all his illness that a man can have internally.

— Lord of Bergenshus castle, Eske Bille

The earliest known reference to "aquavit" is found in a 1531 letter from the Lord of Bergenshus castle (Norway), Eske Bille, to Olav Engelbrektsson, the last Roman Catholic Archbishop of Norway. The letter, dated April 13 and accompanying a package, offers the archbishop "some water which is called Aqua Vite and is a help for all sort of illness which a man can have both internally and externally".

While this claim for the medicinal properties of the drink may be rather inflated, aquavit is popularly believed to ease the digestion of rich foods. In Norway, it is drunk at celebrations, particularly Christmas, Easter, or May 17 (Norwegian Constitution Day). In Denmark, it is traditionally associated with Christmas and Easter lunches. In Sweden, it is a staple of the traditional midsummer celebrations dinner, usually drunk while singing one of many drinking songs. It is usually drunk as snaps during meals, especially during the appetizer course — along with pickled herring, crayfish, lutefisk, or smoked fish. In this regard, it is popularly quipped that aquavit helps the fish swim down to the stomach.

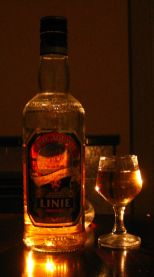
Norwegian Lysholm Linie Aquavit.

It is also a regular in traditional Norwegian Christmas meals, including roasted pork and lamb ribs (pinnekjøtt). The spices and the alcohol are said to help digest the meal, which is very rich in fat.

Among the most widespread brands are Løiten, Lysholm, Opland, and Simers from Norway; Aalborg and Brøndum from Denmark; and O.P. Anderson from Sweden. While the Danish and Swedish variants are normally light in colour, most Norwegian brands are matured in oak casks for at least six months, and some for 12 years, making them generally darker.

Specific to the Norwegian tradition are Linje Aquavits (such as "Løiten Linie" and "Lysholm Linie"). Linje Aquavit is named after the tradition of sending oak barrels of aquavit with ships from Norway to Australia and back again, thereby passing the equator ("linje") twice before being bottled. The constant movement, high humidity, and fluctuating temperature cause the spirit to extract more flavour and accelerate maturation.

Norwegian aquavit distillers Anora (formerly Arcus) carried out a test in which they tried to emulate the rocking of the casks aboard the "Linje" ships while the oak barrels were subjected to the weather elements, as they would be aboard a ship. The finished product was, according to Anora, far from the taste that a proper linje aquavit should have.

Therefore, to this day, boats loaded with "Linie Aquavit" set sail from Norway to Australia and back again before they are bottled and sold as part of the Norwegian Christmas traditions, but also enjoyed all year round.

== Outside the Nordic countries ==
Aquavit was seldom produced outside the Nordic countries, but that began to change dramatically around 2010, especially in the United States, particularly in areas with larger concentrations of people of Nordic heritage. An exception, however, is Northern Germany, and in particular the German state of Schleswig-Holstein, which was part of Denmark until the 19th century (see History of Schleswig-Holstein) and still has a notable Danish minority. Among the most important German brands are Bommerlunder from Flensburg, Kieler Sprotte from Kiel, and Malteserkreuz. Malteserkreuz has been produced in Berlin since 1924 by a subsidiary of Sweden's Vin & Sprit AB (now Pernod Ricard), the producer of many Swedish akvavits, and can be considered a German imitation of the Nordic aquavits since it is based on an original Danish recipe. Brands from Schleswig-Holstein, however, often have a long history, comparable to their Nordic counterparts. Bommerlunder, for instance, has been made since 1760. Aquavit is also an important part of Schleswig-Holstein's traditional cuisine. German aquavit is virtually always distilled from fermented grain and generally has an alcohol content of 38% by volume, marginally less than Scandinavian aquavits.

Many distilleries in the United States produce aquavit, especially in parts of the country with high populations of people of Nordic heritage. Examples include Colorado, Minnesota, Michigan, Wisconsin, Montana, Illinois, Oregon, New Hampshire, and Washington. The Midwest states, in particular, do quite well in this category and have produced numerous internationally acclaimed/award-winning brands. See List of Akvavit Producers in the United States for brand names and distilleries.

Aquavit is also rising in popularity in Canada, particularly in Scandinavian settlements. Notable brands include Spirit of York Co in Toronto, Ontario, Drum Distilling Co in Drumheller, Alberta, and The Newfoundland Distillery Co in Clarkes Beach, Newfoundland.

The Norske-Torske-Klubben, a Norwegian Men's Social Club in Saint Paul, has the tradition of a table-pounding toast in which the members raise their glasses of Aquavit, bang the table three times with their right hand, and shout "Bring on the torsk!".

== Spellings ==
- Danish: Akvavit, Snaps, Brændevin or Dram
- Norwegian: Akevitt, Brennevin or Dram
- Swedish: Akvavit, Snaps or Kryddat brännvin
- Dutch: Aquavit
- English: Aquavit or Akvavit
- Faroese: Akvavitt
- Estonian: Akvaviit
- Finnish: Akvaviitti
- French: Aquavit
- German: Aquavit, Kö(ö)m
- Icelandic: Ákavíti, Brennivín
- Italian: Acquavite
- Polish: Okowita
- Portuguese: Aquavit
- Ukraine: Оковита

== See also ==
- Brännvin, a more general term that includes unflavoured brands
- Poitín, an Irish distilled spirit occupying a similar place in the culture
