= List of Akvavit producers =

Akvavit is distilled in several locations by a number of different producers. Most small distillers founded in the 19th century have now been bought out by larger concerns, so distillation is performed by a surprisingly small number of companies. For example, in Norway, there are only two companies. Below is a list of aquavit distillers and brands organized by the general location of the distiller. Note that Vin & Sprit AB of Sweden has subsidiaries in several countries. It is also the owner of the Absolut Vodka brand.

In later years a new wave of independent distillers has seen the light of day in Scandinavia.

== Norway ==
Arcus Produkter A/S (Subsidiary of Arcus-Gruppen AS) - Owner of the brands:

- Gammel Opland
- Gilde
- Linie
- Løitens
- Simers
- Throndhjems
- Bergens Aquavit 1818

Det Norske Brenneri and K. G. Puntervold AS - Owner of the brands:

- Arvesølvet
- Helt Klar
- Fisker Snaps
- Nissedram
- Høvding
- Jeger Snaps
- Barents

Inderøy brenneri - Producing both own and others' brands:

- Den gyldne akevitt (own brand)
- Inderøy taffelakevitt (own brand)
- A. Ystads akevitt (owned by Ystad børst og brennevin)
- Ystad jubileumsakevitt (owned by Ystad børst og brennevin)
- Many more

== Faroe Islands ==
Dism Ltd. - Owner of the brands "Havið" (The Ocean), and "Lívsins Vatn" (the Water of Life). They claim that "Havið", at 50% ABV is the strongest akvavit in the world.

- Dism

Einar’s Distillary, is a local faroese producer of Akvavit. The Akvavit is made from faroese water, caraway and faroese herbs.

- Einar’s Distillary

== Iceland ==
- Brennivín, produced by Egill Skallagrímsson Brewery

== Canada ==
Okanagan Spirits - Owner of the brand:

- Aquavitus - Aquavit

Sheringham Distillery

- Akvavit

Long Table Distillery

- Långbord Akvavit

Island Spirits - Owner of the brand:

- Phrog Aquavit

== Denmark ==
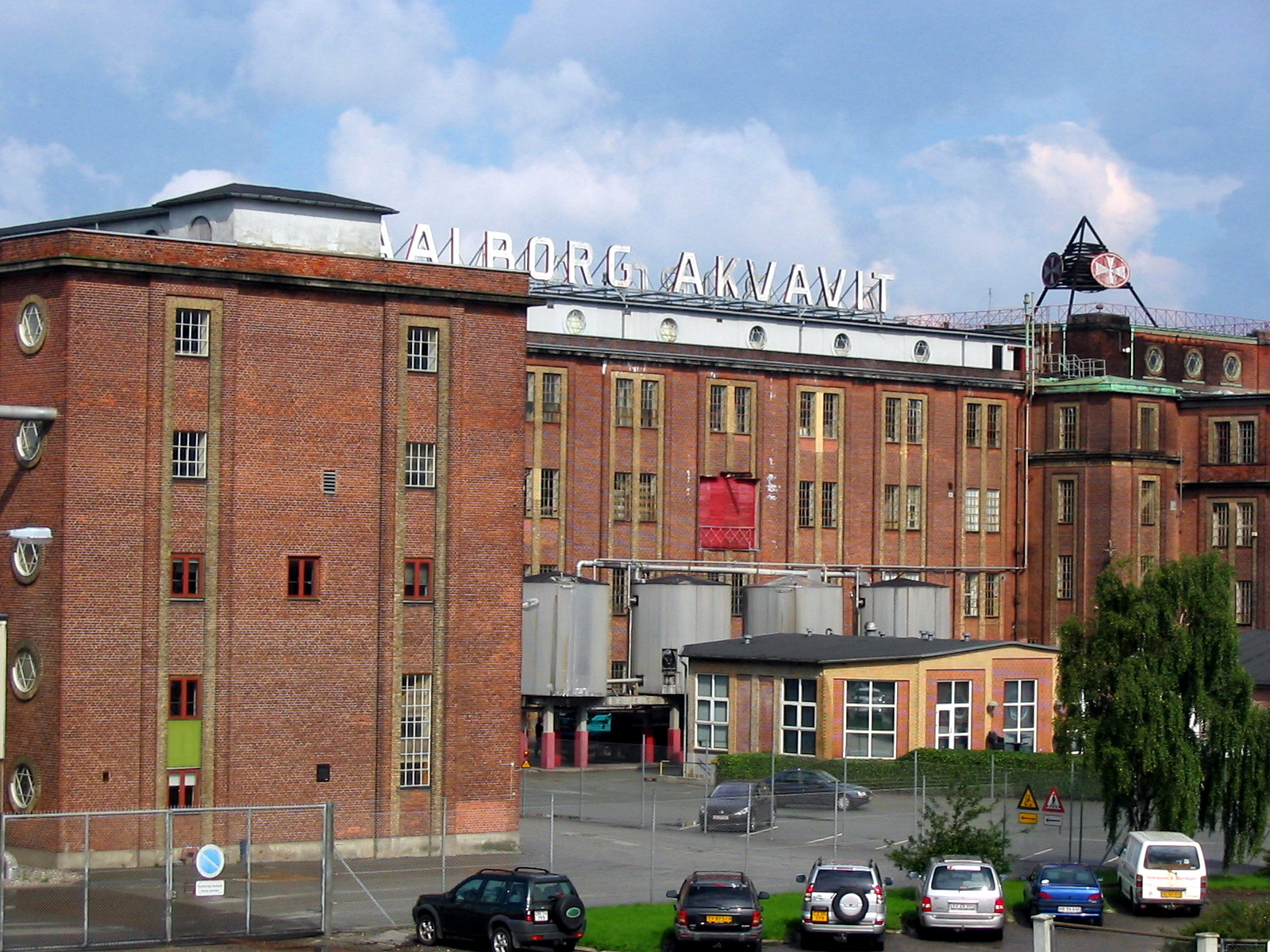
Aalborg Akvavit

- De Danske Spritfabrikker (there are many sub-brands) (owned by Arcus)
- Brøndum (owned by Altia)
- Harald Jensen (produced by Aalborg)
- Den Bornholmske Spritfabrik (currently produce 2 Akvavits year round and 3 seasonal Akvavits; Bornholmer Akvavit 40%, Bornholmer 1855 Traditionsakvavit 42%, Bornholmer Paaskeakvavit/Easter Akvavit, Bornholmer Sommerakvavit/Summer Akvavit & Bornholmer Juleakvavit/Christmas Akvavit)
- Copenhagen Distillery
- Schumachers (produces HC Andersen Akvavit)
- Plateau Spirits
- Aqua Vitae
- Nordisk Brænderi
- Den Ny Spritfabrik
- Vi.Er.Akvavit
- Taster Wine (produces Ækvator Akvavit)
- Søbogaard
- Helsingør Spritfabrik (today owned by United Spirits Brands Denmark)
- Thylandia
- Brænderiet Enghaven

== Sweden ==
Vin & Sprit AB - Owner of the brands:

- Gammal Norrlands
- Hallands Fläder
- Herrgårds
- Hjärtansfröjd
- Läckö Slottsaquavit
- Nyköpings Brännvin
- O.P. Anderson
- Porsbrännvin
- Rånäs Brännvin
- Skåne
- Stockholm
- Svart Vinbärs Brännvin
- Tällbergs Festbrännvin
- Årsta Brännvin
- Ödåkra Taffelaqvavit

Symposion International AB - Owner of the brands:

- Esping Bitter
- Malmö Akvavit
- Svensk Akvavit 1755

Symposion International also owns award winning brands Grand Bark (blended whisky) and Purity Vodka.

== Germany ==
August Ernst GmbH & Co. KG Bad Oldesloe - Owner of the brand:

- Oldesloer Aquavit "Sankt Petrus"

Alte MACKENSTEDTER Kornbrennerei H. Turner GmbH - Owner of the brands:

- Lloyd Finest Aquavit

Berentzen Brennereien GmbH & Co. KG - Owner of the brands:

- Bommerlunder
- Bommerlunder Gold

Bartels-Langness Handelsgesellschaft mbH & Co. KG - Owner of the brand:

- Kieler Sprotte Aquavit

Birkenhof-Brennerei GmbH - Owner of the brand:

- Westerwälder-Aquavit

V&S Deutschland GmbH (Subsidiary of Sweden's Vin & Sprit AB) - Owner of the brands:

- Malteserkreuz Aquavit
- Malteser No. 2

Schilkin GmbH & Co. KG Berlin - Owner of the brand:

- Wikinger Feuer Aquavit

A.H. Johannsen GmbH & Co. KG Flensburg - Owner of the brand:

- Aquavit No. 6

Wilhelm Büchter GmbH & Co. KG - Owner of the brands:

- Nordkap Aquavit
- Mildborg Aquavit

Ludwig Dwersteg jun. GmbH & Co. KG - Owner of the brand:

- Friedensreiter Aquavit

Kreuzritter GmbH & Co. KG - Owner of the brand:

- Dreiling

Hardenberg-Wilthen AG - Owner of the brand:

- Original Lehment Rostocker Aquavit

== United States ==
Alaska

Ursa Major Distilling

- AKavit

California

Blinking Owl Distillery

- AQUAVIT

Downtime Cocktails / Batch 22

Geijer Spirits

Stark Spirits - Owner/Producer of the brand:

- Traditional Aquavit

Venus Spirits - Owner/Producer of the brand:

- AQUAVIT - Special Release

Colorado

Breckenridge Distillery - Owner/Producer of the brand:

- 2x World's Best Winner (Breckenridge High Proof Bourbon Whiskey, Breckenridge Gin) & 9x Best American Blended Winner - Icons of Whisky Awards (https://breckenridgedistillery.com/products/)

Devil's Head Distillery - Owner/Producer of the brand:

- Award-winning Aquavit
- Gold-medal award winning Oak Barrel Reserve Aquavit

Illinois

North Shore Distillery - Owner/Producer of the brand:

- Aquavit - Private Reserve

CH Distillery - Owner/Producer of the brand:

- CH Aquavit

Indiana

3 Floyds Distilling - Owner/Producer of the brand:

- BüstHedd Akvavit

Michigan

Long Road Distillers - Owner/Producer of the brand:

- Long Road Distillers Aquavit

Norden Distilling - Owner/Producer of the brand:

- Norden Aquavit Awarded Double Gold + Best Aquavit at the San Francisco World Spirits Competition

Minnesota

Ida Graves Distillery - Owner/Producer of the brand

- Ida Graves Aquavit

Skaalvenn Distillery - Owner/Producer of the brand

- Skaalvenn Aquavit

Vikre Distillery - Owner/Producer of the brand:

- Vikre Øvrevann

Tattersall Distilling - Owner/Producer of the brand:

- Tattersall Aquavit

Norseman Distillery - Owner/Producer of the brand:

- Norseman Aquavit

J. Carver Distillery

Montana

Montgomery Distillery - Owner/Producer of the brand:

- Skadi Aquavit

New Hampshire

Cathedral Ledge Distillery - Owner/Producer of the brand:

- Organic Aquavit

Tamworth Distillery - Owner/Producer of the brand:

- Skiklubben Aquivit

New York

Aquavit Restaurant - Owner of the brand:

- Aquavit (Produced in Sweden)

North Dakota

Proof Artisan Distillers - Owner/Producer of the brand:

- MINIONS Vän Skap Aquavit

Oregon

House Spirits - Owner/Producer of the brands:

- Krogstad Festlig Aquavit
- Krogstad Gamle Aquavit

Bull Run Distillery - Owner/Producer of the brand:

- Regnig Dag

Rolling River Spirits - Owner/Producer of the brand:

- Ole Bjørkevoll Aquavit
- Old Ole Bjørkevoll Aquavit
- Bjørkevoll's Holiday Aquavit
- Bjørkevoll's Gamle Holiday Aquavit
- Stilar Reserve Brown Bear Aquavit
- Stilar Reserve Wild Boar Aquavit
- Stilar Reserve old Goat Taffel Aquavit

Pennsylvania

Rowhouse Spirits (Permanently Closed) - Owner/Producer of the brand:

- Rowhouse Nordic Akvavit

Lucky Sign Distillery - Owner/Producer of the brand:

- Lucky Sign Aquavit

Texas

Griffin Spirits - Owner of the brand:

- Valhalla Premium Aquavit

Virginia

James River Distillery - Owner/Producer of the brand:

- Øster Vit

Washington

Blackfish Spirits Distillery - Owner/Producer of the brand:

- Blackfish Aquavit

Bluewater Distilling - Owner/Producer of the brand:

- Wintersun Organic Aquavit

Hardware Distillery - Owner/Producer of the brand:

- Hardware Distillery Aquavit

Scratch Distillery — Owner/Producer of the brand:

- Scratch Distillery Waquavit
- Scratch Distillery Underground Aquavit
- Scratch Distillery Series Lemon Pepper Aquavit

Sound Spirits - Owner/Producer of the brand:

- Blekk Sprut Aquavit

Wisconsin

State Line Distillery - Owner/Producer of the brand:

- Aquavit

45th Parallel Spirits - Producer of the brands / Gamle Ode - Owner of the brands:

- Gamle Ode Dill
- Gamle Ode Holiday
- Gamle Ode Celebration
