= Drinking song =

Song sung while drinking alcohol

A drinking song is a song that is sung before or during alcohol consumption. Most drinking songs are folk songs or commercium songs, and may be varied from person to person and region to region, in both the lyrics and in the music.

In Germany, drinking songs are called Trinklieder. In Sweden, where they are called dryckesvisor or snapsvisor, there are drinking songs associated with Christmas, Midsummer, and other celebrations. An example of such a song is "Helan går". In Spain, "Asturias, patria querida" (the anthem of Asturias) is usually depicted as a drinking song. In France, historical types of drinking songs are chanson pour boire and air à boire.

== Traditional drinking songs ==
=== English ===
- "99 Bottles of Beer"
- "Barnacle Bill the Sailor"
- "Barrett's Privateers"
- "The Barley Mow"
- "Beer, Beer, Beer"
- "California Drinking Song"
- "Drunken Sailor"
- "Engineers' Drinking Song"
- "Fathom the Bowl"
- "Friends in Low Places"
- "Good Ship Venus"
- "Home for a Rest"
- "I Used to Work in Chicago"
- "If You're Happy and You Know It"
- "(I've Been Floating Down) The Old Green River"
- "Lanigan's Ball"
- "Limericks"
- "Little Brown Jug"
- "Seven Drunken Nights"
- "The Goddamned Dutch"
- "The S&M Man"
- "Walking Down Canal Street"
- "Whiskey in the Jar"
- "The Wild Rover"
- "The Rattlin' Bog"

=== Other ===
- "Bevilo tutto" (Italian song)
- "Drobna drabnitsa" (Belarusian song)
- "Ein Heller und ein Batzen"
- "Eisgekühlter Bommerlunder"
- "Helan går" (Swedish)
- "Libiamo ne' lieti calici" from Giuseppe Verdi's La Traviata

== Lieder ==
Franz Schubert wrote several lieder (art songs) known as "Trinklied":

- D 75, Cantata "Trinklied" ['Freunde, sammelt euch im Kreise'] for bass, men's choir and piano (1813)
- D 148 (Op. posth. 131, No. 2), Cantata "Trinklied" ['Brüder! unser Erdenwallen'] for tenor, men's choir and piano (1815)
- D 169, Chorus "Trinklied vor der Schlacht" ['Schlacht, du brichst an!'] for double unison choir and piano (1815)
- D 183, Cantata "Trinklied" ['Ihr Freunde und du gold’ner Wein'] for voice, unison choir and piano (1815)
- D 242, Trio "Trinklied im Winter" ['Das Glas gefüllt!'] for two tenors and bass (1815, 1st setting; D deest is the 2nd setting, with a different title)
- D 267, Quartet "Trinklied" ['Auf! Jeder sei nun froh und sorgenfrei!'] for two tenors, two basses and piano (1815)
- D 356, Quartet "Trinklied" ['Funkelnd im Becher so helle, so hold'] for two tenors, two basses and piano (1816, fragment)
- D 426, Trio "Trinklied (Herr Bacchus ist ein braver Mann)" ['Herr Bacchus ist ein braver Mann'] for two tenors and bass (1816, lost)
- D 427, Trio "Trinklied im Mai" ['Bekränzet die Tonnen'] for two tenors and bass (1816)
- D 847, Quartet "Trinklied aus dem 16. Jahrhundert" ['Edit Nonna, edit Clerus'] for two tenors and two basses (1825)
- D 888, Song "Trinklied" ['Bacchus, feister Fürst des Weins'] for voice and piano (1826)

Hugo Wolf's lied "Zur Warnung" ("As á Warning") (no. 49 in Mörike-Lieder) is from the perspective of someone with a bad hangover.

Two of the six numbers in Gustav Mahler's orchestral song cycle Das Lied von der Erde (no.1 "Das Trinklied vom Jammer der Erde" ("The Drinking Song of Earth's Misery") and no. 5 {"Der Trunkene im Frühling" ("The Drunken Man in Spring")) are about drinking.

== See also ==
- Brindisi
- Snapsvisa

== Notes ==
- Cray, Ed. The Erotic Muse: American Bawdy Songs (University of Illinois, 1992).
- Legman, Gershon. The Horn Book. (New York: University Press, 1964).
- Reuss, Richard A. An Annotated Field Collection of Songs From the American College Student Oral Tradition (Bloomington: Indiana Univ. Masters Thesis, 1965).
