= I Used to Work in Chicago =

Song, Larry Vincent

"I Used to Work in Chicago" (Roud 4837) is a drinking song. It was written by songwriter and entertainer Larry Vincent. The earliest printed date for the song is March 1945 in the underground mimeographed songbook Songs of the Century, however versions of the song circulated "on the street" as early as 1938 according to the Digital Tradition Folk Music Database. Many of the lyrics are considered humorous because of the oblique sexual references. The song is often chanted by various British university sports teams.

After World War II, there were various versions of this song commercially recorded (e.g. by Spike Jones).

A verse from Spike Jones's version:

I used to work in Wisconsin
Behind the smorgasbord
In the cafeteria.
A lady came in the door.
She said she wanted a boiled egg.
I said "What part do you like?"
[Germanic accent] Yolk she vanted, a yoke I told.
I'll never work there anymore....

== Recordings ==
- The Three Bits Of Rhythm on Modern Records 118A from 1946
- Oscar Brand on Bawdy Songs and Backroom Ballads 1951
- Merle Travis on Guitar Rags & A Too Fast Past 1994
- Benny Bell on Shaving Cream 1975, Track Title: Jack of All Trades
