= Lysholm =

Lysholm is a surname. Notable people with the surname include:

- Alf Lysholm (1893–1973), Swedish engineer
- Catharina Lysholm (1744–1815), Norwegian businesswoman and ship-owner
- Jørgen B Lysholm (1796–1843), Norwegian liquor merchant
- Claus_Lysholm (1962- ), Danish entrepreneur
