= Drobna drabnitsa =

"Drobna drabnitsa" (Belarusian: «Дробна драбніца»; English: «Trifle of trifles») is a Belarusian drinking song. The literal translation of the title would be "trifle of trifles", but in this context would mean something like English: "diddle-a-diddle". Known under several other titles, viz "Ad panyadzyelku da panyadzyelku" (Belarusian: "Ад панядзелку да панядзелку"; English: "From Monday till Monday"), "Basota" or "Halota" (Belarusian: "Басота" or Belarusian: "Галота"; English: "Poor never-do-wells").

== Belarusian lyrics ==
As sung popularly now, plus some of the variations

Дробна драбніца, дробна драбніца^{*}
Дробны дожджык лье
Сабралася бедна басота^{**}
Ды гарэлку п’е.
(2 last lines of each verse repeated)

П’ем мы гарэлку, п’ем мы гарэлку^{***}
Будзем піць віно
А хто прыйдзе з нас насмяецца
Будзем біць таго.

Ой, прыйшоў дзядзька, дзядзька багаты
Насміхаецца:
— Скуль жа, скуль жа бедна басота
Напіваецца?

Ой ты не смейся, дзядька багаты
Ты не смейся з нас,
Вазьмі ў рукі чарку гарэлкі,
Выпі ты за нас.

— Рад бы я выпіць, рад бы я з’есці,
Рад бы закусіць.
Але ж маю сто рублёў грошай,
Шкода размяніць.

Адзін за ручкі, другі за ножкі,
Трэці ў карак б’е:
— Не хадзі ты, дзядзька багаты,
Дзе басота п’е.

Дробна драбніца, дробна драбніца...

- ^* Also: Ад панядзелку да панядзелку
- ^** Also: ...бедна галота
- ^*** Also: П’ем мы гарэлку, п’ем мы вішнёўку

As collected in 1950 from Ms. Paŭlina Miadziolka, village Budslaw, Kryvitski region, Minsk voblast’

Дробна драбніца, дробна драбніца,
Дробны дождж ідзе.
Ой, сабралася бедна галота
Дый гарэлку п’е.
(2 last lines of each verse repeated)

— П’ём мы гарэлку, п’ём мы гарэлку
Будзем піць віно.
А хто к нам прыйдзе, будзе смяяцца,
Будзем біць таго.

Ой, прыйшоў дзядзька, дзядзька багаты
Насміхаецца:
— А скуль жа гэта бедна галота
Напіваецца?

Ой ты не смейся, дзядьку багаты
Ты не смейся з нас,
Вазьмі у рукі чарку гарэлкі,
Выпі ты да нас.

— Рад бы я выпіць, рад бы я з’есці,
Рад бы закусіць.
Сто рублёў маю, сто рублёў маю,
Недзе размяніць.

У цябе сотні, а ў нас драбніца,
Дык не смейся з нас.
Ідзі ты к чорту, дзядзька багаты,
Ідзі ты к чорту ад нас!

Адзін за ругі, другі за ногі,
Трэці ў карак б’е:
— Ой, не йдзі, не йдзі, дзядзька багаты,
Дзе галота п’е!

== English translation (incomplete) ==
Trifle of trifles, trifle of trifles
Rain is mizzling down
Poor ne’er-do-wells gathered together
And are getting drunk

Drinking the spirits, drinking the spirits,
Gonna drink the wine
Dare someone mock us a little
Will be beaten down
...

Note: proper names and places’ names are rendered in BGN/PCGN.
