= Helan Går =

Swedish drinking song

Helan går is a popular Swedish drinking song, or snapsvisa. Helan ("the whole") is an expression signifying the first (small) glass of spirit (commonly akvavit or vodka) in a series, and går means "goes (down)"; loosely translated as, "Bottoms up!" Thus, it is commonly sung as a toast, typically for the first glass of spirit at a seated dinner. The song has also become quite common in Finland, especially at academic dinners.

When Sweden's ice hockey team won the 1957 World Ice Hockey Championships in Moscow, not all of the Swedish players knew the lyrics to Du gamla, du fria, the de facto Swedish national anthem, so the players sang Helan går instead.

The song's origin is uncertain because it is rarely noted in historical documents. One early mention occurs in an operetta in 1843. Several composers have written variations of the melody, including Franz Lehár. In 1959 The Belafonte Folk Singers recorded Heylan Går on the album Drinking Songs Around The World RCA LSP1992. The song, in an instrumental version under the title Helan, is present as a ringtone on some Nokia mobile phones, possibly as a nod to Nokia's Nordic (Finnish) heritage. It is Sweden's theme in Civilization VI.

== Lyrics ==
Original text

Helan går ("he-lan går")
Sjung hopp faderallan lallan lej
Helan går
Sjung hopp faderallan lej
Och den som inte helan tar^{*}
Han heller inte halvan får
Helan går
[drink]
Sjung hopp faderallan lej!

English version

Here's the first
Sing "hup fol-de-rol la la la la"
Here's the first
Sing "hup fol-de-rol la la"
He who doesn't drink the first
Shall never, ever quench his thirst
Here's the first
[drink]
Sing "hup fol-de-rol la la"

Direct translation

The whole goes (down)
Sing "hup fol-de-rol la la la la"
The whole goes (down)
Sing "hup fol-de-rol la la"
And he who doesn't the whole take
He neither does the half get
The whole goes (down)
[drink]
Sing "hup fol-de-rol la la"

Phonetic sing-along version (en)

Hey-lan gore
Hung hop father lala lala lay
Hey-lan gore
Hung hop father lala lay
Oh then some in the hey-lan tar
Han hell eh in the hall van fore
Hey-lan goooooore
[drink]
Hung hop father lala laaaay

^{*}In the classic version, "trår" (wants) is used instead of "tar" (take), which rhymes with the following verse-ending "får". The change to "tar" stems from "trår" being mispronounced and misheard, as well as "tar" being easier to say and being a more conventional word than "trår".

The whole (Swedish: helan) and the half (halvan) in the lyrics above refer to the names traditionally given to the first and second snaps (names exist up to number 18). The meaning is therefore "the one who doesn't drink the first snaps won't get the second one either".

== References (Swedish) ==
- Christina Mattsson, Helan går. 150 visor till skålen, Atlantis, 2002.
- Christina Mattsson, Från Helan till lilla Manasse, Atlantis, 2002.
