= Baby Gramps =

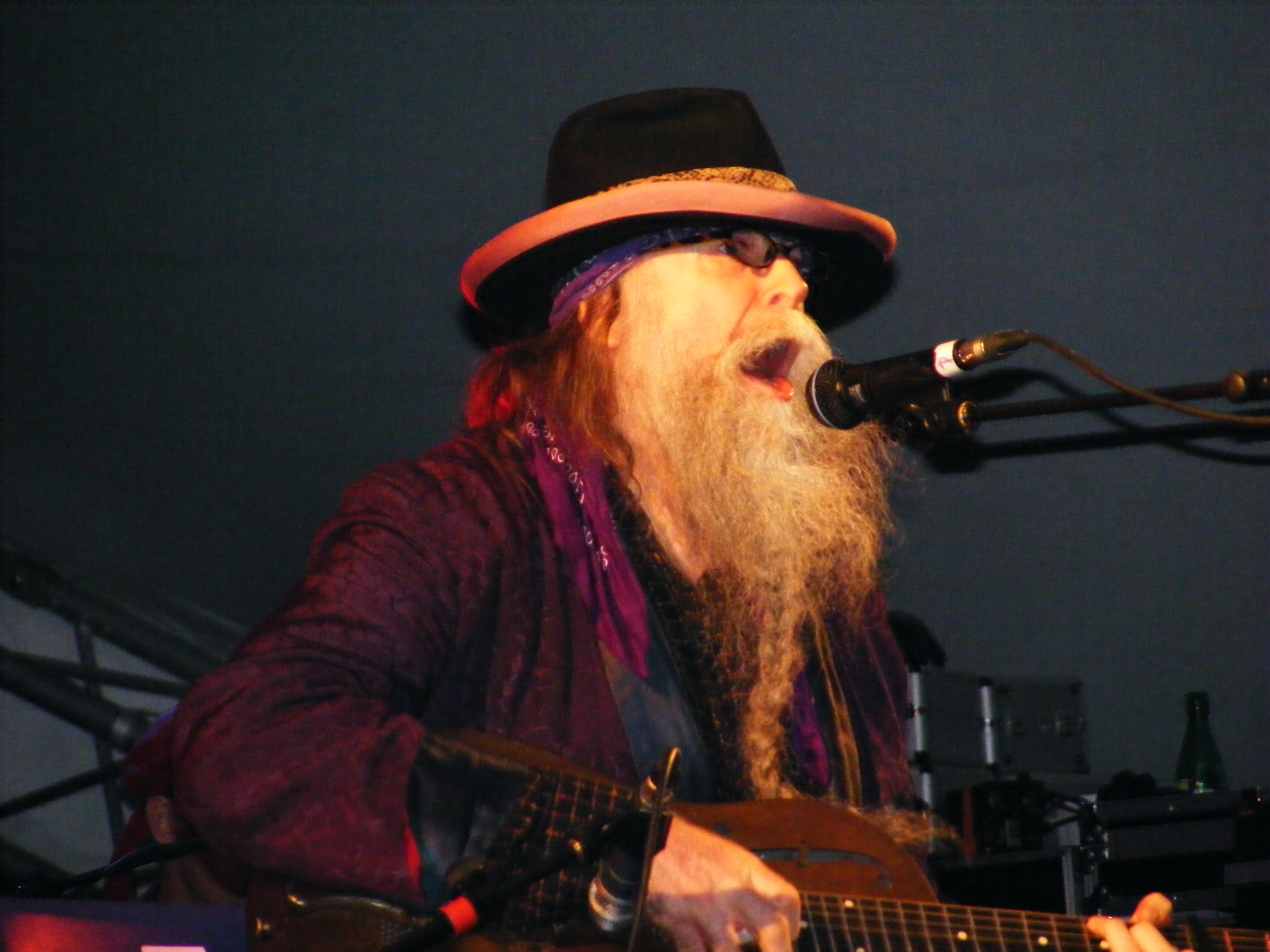
- Baby Gramps at Analog, Ringsend, Dublin Ireland (Photo: Sean Rowe)

Background information
- Born: Miami, Florida, U.S.
- Genres: Folk, country, Americana, blues
- Occupations: Musician, songwriter
- Instruments: Vocals, guitar, pedal steel guitar,
- Years active: 1964–present
- Labels: Grampophone; ANTI-
- Website: BabyGramps.com

Baby Gramps is an American guitar performer, who, though born in Miami, Florida, has been based in the Northwest U.S. for at least the last 40 years. He is famous for his palindromes. Baby Gramps started performing in 1964 and is still playing professionally as of 2018.

== Style ==
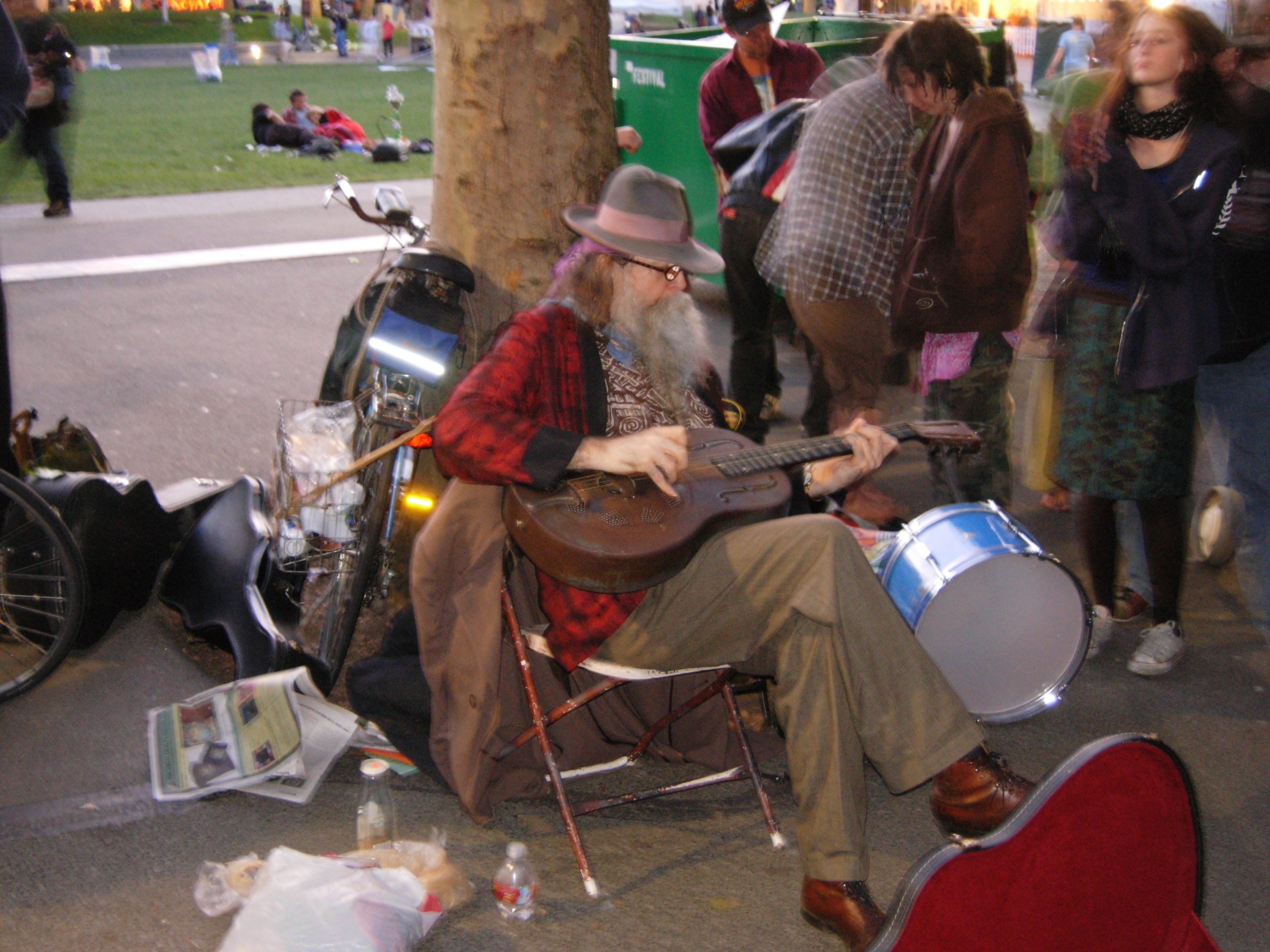
Busking at Northwest Folklife

Baby Gramps plays a mixture of styles and eras including traditional blues, children's and labor songs, and his own compositions. His busy and unusual guitar style includes flat and finger picking, and "chording" with the back of his hand and his elbow. His singing styles include throat singing. His performance is based in part on improvisation and he often encourages audience participation. Baby Gramps has performed as a street musician, and has toured with Artis the Spoonman, Béla Fleck and the Flecktones and Phish. His rendition of "The Teddy Bears' Picnic" was featured in Martin Bell's Academy Award-nominated documentary film, Streetwise.

== Popularity ==
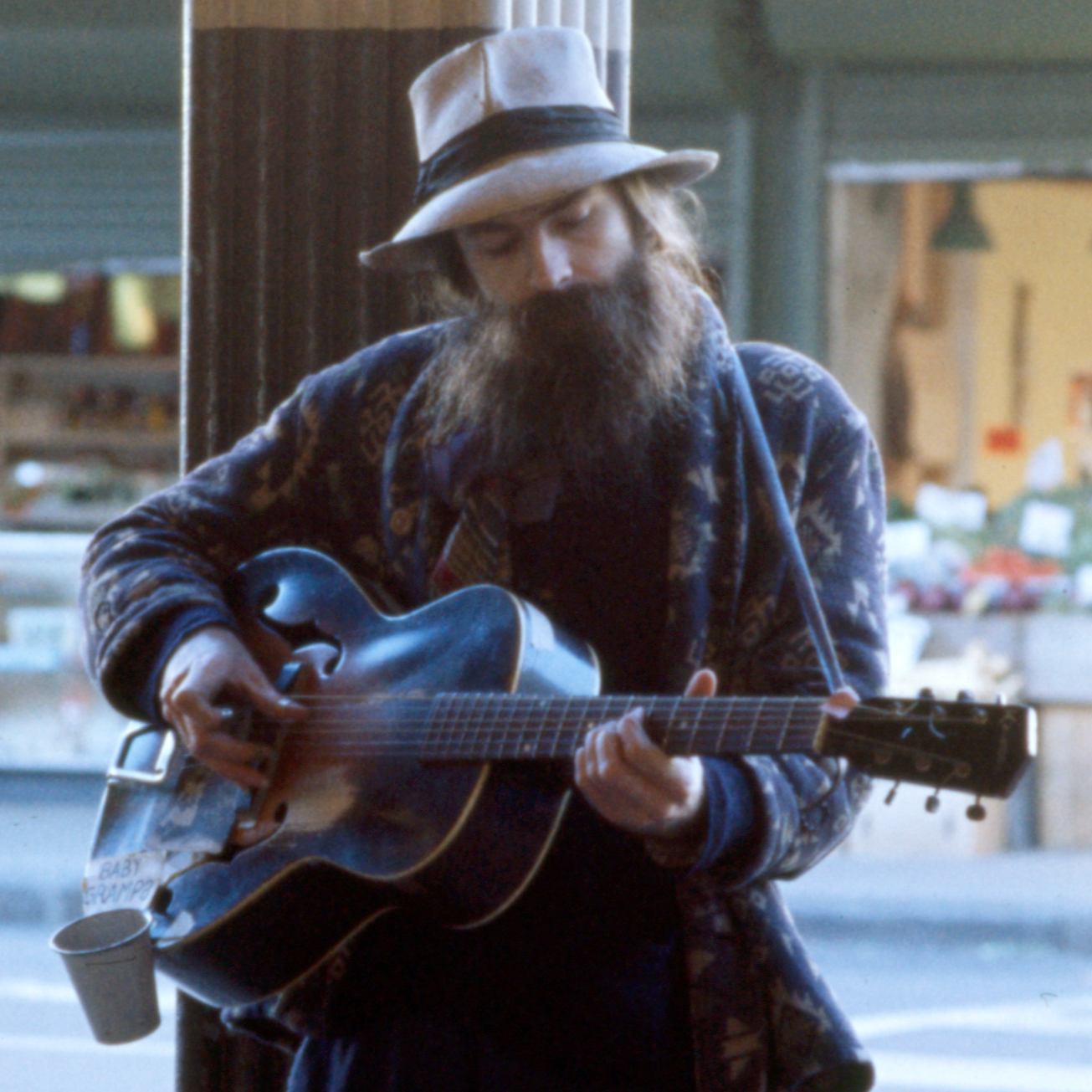
Baby Gramps busking in Seattle's Pike Place Market in the 1970s

Writer Patrick Ferris said he has "a mass appeal in the sense that any audience between the age of 2 and 102 are captivated by his vaudeville antics, hilarious lyrics and animated guitar playing... His voice is a cross between Popeye the Sailor and a Didgeridoo and the plinkity plink of his VERY worn National steel guitar, sounds like a wind up jack in the box. If you listen closely and know anything about music, you'll realize Gramps is an absolutely incredible guitar player. Being a professional musician for over 40 years can't help but give you some sort of chops, but Gramps is a modern day Robert Johnson; a revolutionary guitarist that, like Thelonious Monk on piano, can play the notes 'between the cracks.'"

== Discography ==
- Same Ol' Timeously: Vocalisthenics & Stunt Guitar (CD, Grampophone 1001), 2000
- Hossradish CD (Baby Gramps Trio), 2003
- Baptized on Swamp Water CD (Baby Gramps & his Back Swamp Potioners), 2006
- Rogue's Gallery: Pirate Ballads, Sea Songs, and Chanteys (two tracks, 'Cape Cod Girls' and 'Old Man of the Sea' on compilation CD), Anti-Records, 2006
- Outertainment CD (Baby Gramps & Peter Stampfel), Red Newt Records, 2010

Videos:

- SomeDemos Originally released on VHS in 1996 Re-released on DVD together with "Sauteed To A Fine Crisp" in 2006.

Filmed on 8/26/93 when Baby Gramps opened for Phish in Portland OR. 1) Richland Woman Blues 2) Back Swamp Potioner 3) Let's all be fairies Running time: 20 min. Produced/Directed/Edited by Sam Small for Small Wonder Video Services. Baby Gramps actually shared the stage with Phish, performing the enigmatic “Tea Tray Song” with Fishman on vacuum during the second set.

- Sauteed To A Fine Crisp Originally released on VHS in 1999 Re-released on DVD together with "SomeDemos" in 2006.
1. "Breakfast Blues"
2. "Anagram Song"
3. "The Shortest Poem In The World"
4. "The Wooden Darning Egg"
5. "Nothin' But A Nothin'"
6. "Palindromes"
7. "Uncontrovertable Facts"
8. "The Big Rock Candy Mountain"
9. "Teddybears' Picnic"

Running time: 37 min. This video was stitched together from three performances that were filmed at "Funhouse": A Contemporary Theatre, in conjunction with TheatreVision and ShadowCatcher Entertainment. Conceived and directed by Paul Magid and Ron W. Bailey. Stage show written by Magid; teleplay written by Magid and Alex Metcalf; musical direction by Mark Ettinger. "Funhouse" starred vaudevillians Dmitri Karamazov of the Flying Karamazov Brothers, Rebecca Chace, Cathy Sutherland and the UMO Ensemble, and featured Baby Gramps and Christian Swenson, among others. A psychedelically inspired feast was served by Chez Ray Sewal. The raw multi-camera video from three of Gramp's solo performances were given over to Sam Small of Small Wonder Video Services who edited and released 'Sauteed To A Fine Crisp'.

- I Shall Continuum! Released on DVD in 2004. Produced, Directed and Edited by Sam Small for Small Wonder Video Services

Recorded Live at Terra Blues, Greenwich Village, NYC

1. "Ankle Wrench Rag
2. "New Big Rock Candy Mountain
3. A Ragtime Continuum / "Rags Makes Paper" / "Paper Makes Money" / "A Man Took A Ride In An Airplane"
4. A Ragtime Medley: "Ragged But Right" / "Certain l Am Living' A Ragtime Life"
5. "Charge It To The Dust & Let The Rain Settle It"
6. "Dream A Little Dream Of Me"
7. "Skillet Of Snakes"
8. "Satisfied Mind"
9. "Thought I Heard The Voice Of A Porkchop Say Come Unto Me & Rest"
10. "Ballad Of A Thin Man" (Mr. Jones)
11. "Possum Opera"
