= Bevilo tutto =

"Bevilo tutto" ("Drink it all", "Drink it up") is an Italian drinking song. A version is documented in I Nuovi Goliardi – Periodico mensuale di storia Trieste, in the 1880s. The song was also featured in the movie The Hitman's Bodyguard with Samuel L Jackson singing with some nuns in a bus.

== Versions ==
Apart from the line "Se l'è bevuto tutto, E non gli ha fatto male" (with variant spellings in dialect) the rest of the text has various versions. The version as written in I Nuovi Goliardi Trieste 1881:

Con questo calcione
si carica la balestra
e chi ha un bicchier in mano
al suo compagno il presta
e mentre che ei berrà

noi farem bom, ba, ba, ba
bom ba ba ba bom ba ba ba ba.

E l'ha bevuto tutto
e non gli ha fatto male
chi lo beve allo boccale
bevilo tutto, bevilo tutto
che buon pro ti possa fare.

Different versions of the song and different associated drinking games exist. In some versions when the song is sung the drink must be drunk during the first 3 lines since the fourth line is 'he has drunk it!'.

Bevilo tutto,
Bevilo tutto,
Bevilo tutto!
Se l'è bevuto tutto,
E non gli ha fatto male,
L'acqua gli fa male,
Il vino lo fa cantare!

== Recordings ==
A version of "Bevilo tutto" was recorded by the organetto players Andrea and Riccardo, I Ragazzi della Quadriglia on the Teramo folk song album Il giro del mondo.
