= Jofroi of Waterford =

Dominican translator in Paris

Jofroi of Waterford (fl. 1300) was a French translator.

Probably a native of Waterford in Ireland, Jofroi was a Dominican, apparently based in Paris, where he produced translations of Latin works into the French language. "He has no surviving connection with Ireland other than his name. It appears from an allusion in his work that he was based in Paris."

Jofroi's known translations are:

- translation of the Secretum Secretorum, one of the most widely read books in Western Europe in the Late Middle Ages. Jofroi's French was later translated into English.
- translation of a history of the Trojan War, authorship attributed to Dares Phrygius (pseudepigraphical). (Another book widely circulated in Latin in the Late Middle Ages.)
- translation of a history of Rome by Eutropius (historian). (Once again, a popular book in Latin).
- a co-translation, with Servais Copale, of three prose poems

His original work is a catalogue of all the known wines and ales of Europe.

== Critical Editions ==
- Busby, Keith (2020). The French works of Jofroi de Waterford. Dares Phrygius, 'l'estoire Des Troiens'; Eutropius, 'l'estoire Des Romains'; Pseudo-Aristotle, 'le Secré de Secrés'. Brepols. ISBN 978-2-503-58294-8. OCLC 1159808565.
