= Fathom the Bowl =

Drinking song

Song
- Language: English
- Released: nineteenth century
- Label: drinking song
- Songwriter: Unknown

"Fathom the Bowl" (Roud 880) is an English drinking song dating from the nineteenth century.

== Synopsis ==
With a "Come all ye" opening, the singer invites heroes to join him in praise of punch. There is a catalogue of the ingredients that come from various countries. One verse laments the fact that the singer's father lies at the bottom of the sea. Finally the singer complains that his wife is a scold. During the chorus, the singing slows down in order to relish a rising musical scale on "Fathom-the bowl".

== Commentary ==
The ingredients of punch include expensive spirits, too expensive for ordinary people. This has led to the suggestion that the song would be sung by smugglers. This might place it in the late eighteenth century or early nineteenth century. It might also explain the dead man at the bottom of the sea. On the other hand, it might be a song sung by wealthy middle-class young gentlemen or military officers, which gradually made its way down the social ladder. The use of the word "fathom" is the lesser used verb form, to measure the depth of something. This would rarely be used by non-sailors, which may also be taken to imply something about the lyricist.

=== Historical background ===
The fact that the early versions are almost identical to current versions implies that it has been valued for the simplicity of the words. It is also very compact in geographical spread. Almost all collected version are from the south of England, and none were collected outside England. The verse:

My father he doth lie at the bottom of the sea
No stone at his head, ah, but what careth he?
While that clear crystal fountain over England doth roll
Give me the punch ladle, I’ll fathom the bowl

is slightly mysterious. How does a fountain roll? According to the "folkinfo" website the "Clear crystal fountain" is supposed to refer to winter storms, but it is not obvious how this is either possible or relevant to the story. Perhaps the clouds will roll overhead, in a cold country like England in wintertime.

== Cultural relationships ==
The song implies a camaraderie with all those who hear the song and is ideal for singing in a chorus. Appropriately, there is a beer made by the brewery called "West Berkshire" called "Fathom the Bowl".

=== Standard references ===
- Roud 880
- Gardiner H587 (The "H" stands for Hampshire)

==== Broadsides ====
The earliest printed broadside are Such (London, between 1863 and 1885), Fortey (London, between 1858 and 1885), Hedges (London) and Pitts (London).

=== Textual variants ===
The song was published in 1891 in a songbook, "English Folk Songs" by William Alexander Barrett. It was collected by Sabine Baring-Gould, Cecil Sharp (1907) and George Gardiner (Hampshire 1906). There is almost no variation in the text. It is also known as "The Punch Ladle" or "Bowl Bowl".

=== Motifs ===
It is a so-called "catalogue song", similar to "Good Luck to The Barley Mow" and "All For Me Grog".

== Music ==
The same tune is used in all cases.

=== Recordings ===
Album/Single	Performer	Year	Variant	Notes
"The Watersons"	The Watersons	1966	Fathom the Bowl	A cappella singing
"The Wanton Seed"	Frank Purslow	1968	Fathom the Bowl	Printed version
"The Clockwinder"	Cliff Haslam	??	Fathom the Bowl	
"Pint Pot and Plough"	Mike Ballantyne	1992	Fathom the Bowl	Canadian singer
"Assassin's Creed 4: Black Flag (Sea Shanty Edition) [Original Game Soundtrack]"	Linda Morrison	2013	Fathom the Bowl	
"There's a Clear Crystal Fountain: Songs From Southern England"	Gwilym Davies	2003	Fathom the Bowl	Also available on YouTube
"Rogue's Gallery: Pirate Ballads, Sea Songs, and Chanteys"	John C. Reilly	2006	Fathom the Bowl	
"Heavens To Betsy"	Blackbeard's Tea Party	2009	Fathom the Bowl	British band
"Thrashy Flash and the Irish Stout"	William N. Blyth	2011	Northern Punch Bowl	Canadian singer
"Fathom the bowl with El Pony Pisador"	The Longest Johns	2022	Fathom the Bowl	British band, also available on YouTube
"A Wintertime Feast"	Kinnfolk	2026	Fathom the Bowl	American band from Virginia, also available on YouTube
