= Walking Down Canal Street =

Song
- Released: 1920s
- Genre: Drinking song

"Walking Down Canal Street" is a drinking song from Roaring Twenties New York, describing Canal Street.

There are variations and additional impromptu verses.

Max Hunter collected a version of this song from Charles Varley on January 19, 1967, in Hope, Arkansas (See here). This recording is now on the Southern Missouri State University website online archive of the Max Hunter Collection.

In 2015, the rugby team at the University of Mary Washington was dissolved indefinitely after a recording of team members singing a version of the song was publicized.

== Lyrics ==
Each line is usually first sung by the lead singer, then repeated by the group.

Walking down Canal street
Knocking on every door
Goddamn son of a bitch
I couldn't find a whore

[alt: When I finally found one, she was short and fat; Goddamn, son-of-a-bitch, I'm not fuckin' that!]

I finally found a whore [alt: Then I found another one,]
She was tall and thin
Goddamn son of a bitch
I couldn't get it in

I finally got it in
Worked it all about
Goddamn son of a bitch
I couldn't get it out

I finally got it out
It was red and sore
The moral of this story is
To never fuck a whore

Six weeks later
I went for a piss
Goddamn son of a bitch
She gave me syphilis!

Nine months later
I'd forgotten what I did
Goddamn son of a bitch
She brought me home a kid!

== Sources ==
- Randolf, Vance and G. Legman (editor). Roll Me in Your Arms. "Walking Down Canal Street" on p. 561.
- Doug Clark and the Hot Nuts. Rush Week [LP]. ND (c. 1965). Song is titled "Canal Street".
