= Air à boire =

Air à boire is a French term which was used between the mid-17th and mid-18th centuries for a "drinking song". These were generally strophic, syllabic songs to light texts. Its predecessor was chanson pour boire, the difference being mainly that chansons pour boire were for one voice with lute accompaniment, whereas airs à boire are generally for more than one voice.

Airs à boire are generally contrasted with airs sérieux, which typically had texts on more serious matters, such as "love, pastoral scenes, and political satire." Most airs à boire occur in publications from Paris, and are for one to three voices and lute accompaniment. In the 1690s airs à boire were so popular that new collections containing them were published every three months in Paris. In the period when the term was used, over 250 collections of songs with the title Airs sérieux et à boire were published.

Composers who were prolific in the genre were Marc-Antoine Charpentier (38 compositions), André Campra, François Couperin, Jean-Fery Rebel, Henry Desmarest, Jean-Baptiste Drouart de Bousset, Michel Lambert, Etienne Moulinier, Sébastien Le Camus and Sébastien de Brossard.
