= One More Drink for the Four of Us =

Traditional drinking and marching song

"One More Drink for the Four of Us" (aka "Glorious" or "Drunk Last Night") is a traditional drinking and marching song. It became popular during the First World War, and has been widely repurposed for other marches, college bands, and social clubs. It is referenced in Ulysses and Finnegans Wake.

The song talks about a family of drinkers, whose name is sometimes modified to refer to the group that is singing it. Other lines are sometimes added at the beginning or the end.

== History ==
The origins of the song are uncertain. It was popular during the First World War, and noted by Ralph Barton Perry as a popular marching song in Impressions of a Plattsburg Recruit from The New Republic in 1915.

It is referenced in military stories from that time, such as William Brown's Adventures of an American Doughboy (1919). James Joyce referred to it in Ulysses (1918-1920).

"One More Drink" appeared in the song anthology Immortalia, published in 1927. The song was sung on college campuses and across the United States throughout the 20th century.

The chorus has been included as part of many other drinking songs, such as "There Are No Airborne Rangers", "Glorious" (1950s college song), "The Souse Family", and "The California Drinking Song".

Conversely, other short songs and doggerel have been included as verses of this song.

== Core lyrics ==
(Drink, Drank)
Drunk last night. Drunk the night before,
Gonna get drunk tonight like I never been drunk before,
For when I'm drunk I'm as happy as can be;
For I am a member of the Souse family
Chorus
Singing Glo-ri-ous! Glo-ri-ous!
One keg of beer for the four of us!
Singing glory be to God that there are no more of us;
For one of us could drink it all alone!

=== Other verses ===
Many other verses and variations have been added in different parts of the world. A common second verse in the 20th century:

And the Souse family is the best family
That ever came over from Old Germany.
There's the Highland Dutch, the Lowland Dutch;
The Rotterdam Dutch and all the other damn Dutch.

or

Oh the drunk family is the best family
That ever came over from Old Germany.
There's the Highland Drunks, the Lowland Drunks;
The Amsterdam drunks and the other damn drunks.

The California Drinking Song features lines very similar to the second verses:

And the Souse family is the best family
That ever came over from Old Germany.
There's the Highland Dutch, the Lowland Dutch;
The Rotterdam Dutch and the Irish.
