= The S&M Man =

"The S&M Man" sample is a drinking song parodying the 1972 hit song "The Candy Man". "The S&M Man" is well known and commonly sung by Hash House Harriers, Rugby union players, fraternity members, fighter pilots, and Marines. This song also has been used as a running cadence in the military.

== Lyrics and copyright ==
According to the Harry Fox Agency, BMG & ASCAP the song has not been registered for royalty purposes although there is a song titled "The S&M Girl" in the BMG database. Since this is a modern song, it might be copyrightable; however, as a parody, it is a derivative work and could be subject to questions of fair use by a parody.

Like sung limericks, many, if not most verses to "The S&M Man" are bawdy or at least off-color. Each person offers up a verse which was spontaneously created or modified and, also like limericks, the chorus is sung collectively allowing someone time to pick out a new individual to sing the next verse. Each time the song is sung it is different based upon the people present and the verses they remember or create.

== History of the song ==
The earliest print date for this song is 1990 in the public domain book The Official Rugby Book (and Other Strange Stuff) issued by Cap Pelletier. The song is found on page 203 of the first edition, ninth revision of that book. Since that date, "The S&M Man" has appeared in many printed and digital songbooks. Some of these books are listed below:

- 7440th Combat Song Book (28 February 1991)
- The Songbook of Sigma Pi (ca 1990)
- Definitive Hash Songbook (January 1994) by ZiPpY
- Untitled Text Files (1994) deposited at the Library of Congress Folklife Archive by Paul Woodford. This is song #164 of that collection (American Folklife Collection accession number AFC 1995/023).
- Half-Mind Hymnal (1996-2008) by Flying Booger
- McMaster Engineering Song Book 2014 by Mac Eng. This song book was made public in early 2014, which was followed by the immediate suspension of all those involved. Obviously the song book was published as soon as possible. The S&M man is found on the last page.

By 1994 the song was so well known that a version for women, "The S&M Girl", started appearing in songbooks.
