= Jørgen B. Lysholm =

Norwegian businessman (1796–1843)

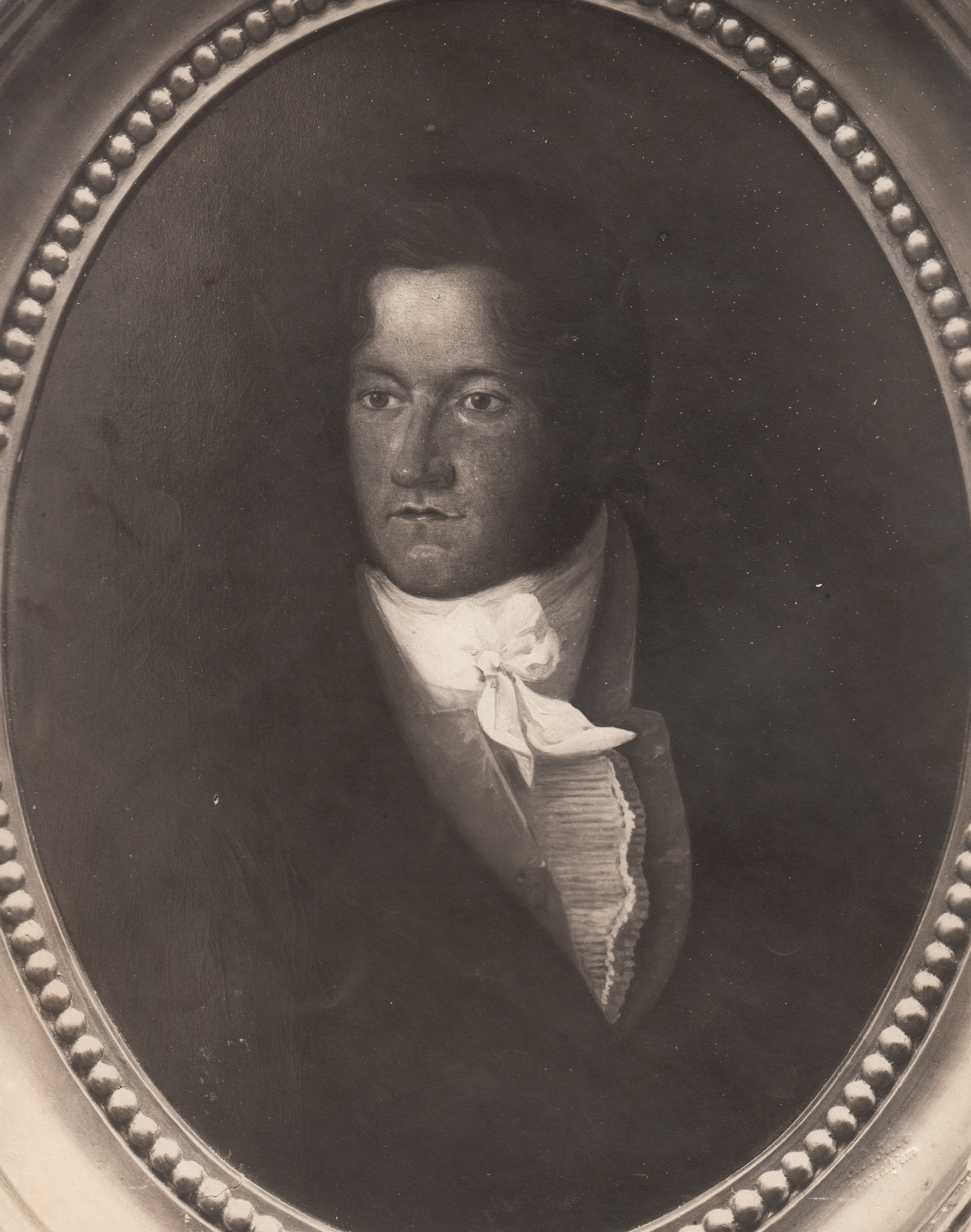
- Lysholm in 1843, shortly before his death
- Born: March 17, 1796
- Died: September 24, 1843 (aged 47)

Jørgen Bernhoft Lysholm (17 March 1796 – 24 September 1843) was a Norwegian liquor manufacturer. In the 18th century, Jørgen B. Lysholm was the best known name in the liquor business.

== Early life ==
He was born in Trondheim, Norway. The Lysholmer's were wealthy shopkeepers from Flensburg who came to Trondheim in the 16th century. As a young man, Jørgen studied in Berlin. Jørgen's father, Nicolay, established a soap factory on Fagerheim in Trondheim, together with his brother. In 1821 the factory was signed over to Jørgen and he turned it into a liquor factory.

== Career ==
The factory made all kinds of liquor, such as punch and aquavit. Lysholm was the first to produce Linie Aquavit, which became the company's most popular brand and best selling product. Linie Aquavit is made as it was in 1842.

After a few years he moved production to Olav Tryggvasons gate 26, also called “Lysholmsgården”.

== Legacy ==
Jørgen B. Lysholm died on the way home from Wiesbaden in 1843.

An avenue is named in honor of him in Trondheim. This avenue passes by the estate of his factory.
