= Snapsvisa =

Traditional Swedish drinking song

A snapsvisa (Swedish for "snaps shanty", plural: snapsvisor) is a traditional Scandinavian drinking song, which is often sung before drinking a small shot of sprit that is called a snaps.

A typical snapsvisa is a short, vigorous song; its lyrics usually tell of the delicacy and glory of the drink, or of the singer’s craving for snaps. Snapsvisor are short, bright, and easy to learn. The most well-known snapsvisa in Sweden is Helan Går.

Snapsvisor are an important part of traditional and family festivities in Sweden, Norway, Denmark, and among Swedish-speaking Finns. The singing of these drinking songs is also a lively part of Scandinavian student culture. They are also widespread among monolingually Finnish students in Finland, although they are rarely met with elsewhere in Finnish drinking culture.

== See also ==
- Drinking culture – Aspect of human behavior
- Drinking song – Song sung while drinking alcohol
- Snaps – Small shot of a strong alcoholic beverage taken during the course of a meal
- Helan går – Swedish drinking song
