= Mackenstedter =

German distillery

The Mackenstedter Distillery produces Mackenstedter Korn in the village of Gross Mackenstedt near Bremen, Germany. It also produces flavored vodka.

== History of the firm ==
As early as 1667, the Mackenstedter family obtained permission (Kruggerechtigkeit) from the local customs authorities in Gross Mackenstedt to distill and sell Korn in their own establishment.

The Mackenstedter Distillery was officially established in the year 1750. The family business is now in its ninth generation.
