= California Drinking Song =

Spirit song from the University of California, Berkeley

"California Drinking Song" is a spirit song from the University of California, Berkeley. The first appearances of this song are traced to 1939. Both the UC Men's Octet and the University of California Marching Band perform it as part of their repertoire. It is a blend of other songs, including "The Goddamned Dutch".

"The core element of “California Drinking Song” is “Rambled,” otherwise known as “California.” The tune is based on the song “Oh, Didn’t He Ramble,” by Cole and Johnson (copyright 1906). The words were changed to what we know as “For California, for California, The hills send back the cry, We’re out to do or die,” and first appeared in printed form in 1906." ..."Titled “One More Drink for the Four of Us,” this part of “California Drinking Song” is a traditional song of conviviality, sung throughout the United States (for example, Ohio State University and New Mexico State University have their own versions of this song)."

In 1940, UCLA Daily Bruin editor Richard Pryne acceded to a request by Earle Raymond Hedrick, provost of the school, to stop printing the words to the song ("Oh, they hadda carry Harry to the ferry . . .") in the student newspaper because a branch of the Women's Christian Temperance Union had complained about it.
