= Chanson pour boire =

French drinking song

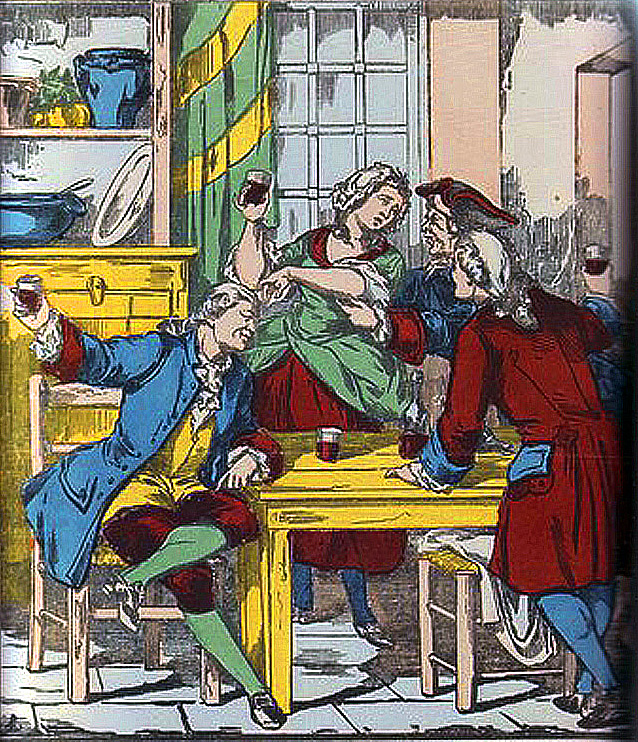
An 18th century chanson pour boire

Chanson pour boire and chanson à boire are terms for French drinking songs, frequently coupled with chanson pour danser (or "song for dancing"). It was used in from about 1627–1670. It is different from the air à boire primarily by the period the term was used, and that chansons pour boire are usually for one voice with lute accompaniment, and airs à boire are for multiple voices with lute accompaniment. Both are fairly simple; strophic, with syllabic settings of light texts. The texts are usually about drinking and are humorous.

== See also ==
- Chanson paillarde, popular French songs with a sexual and humorous content.
