= Brunette (song form) =

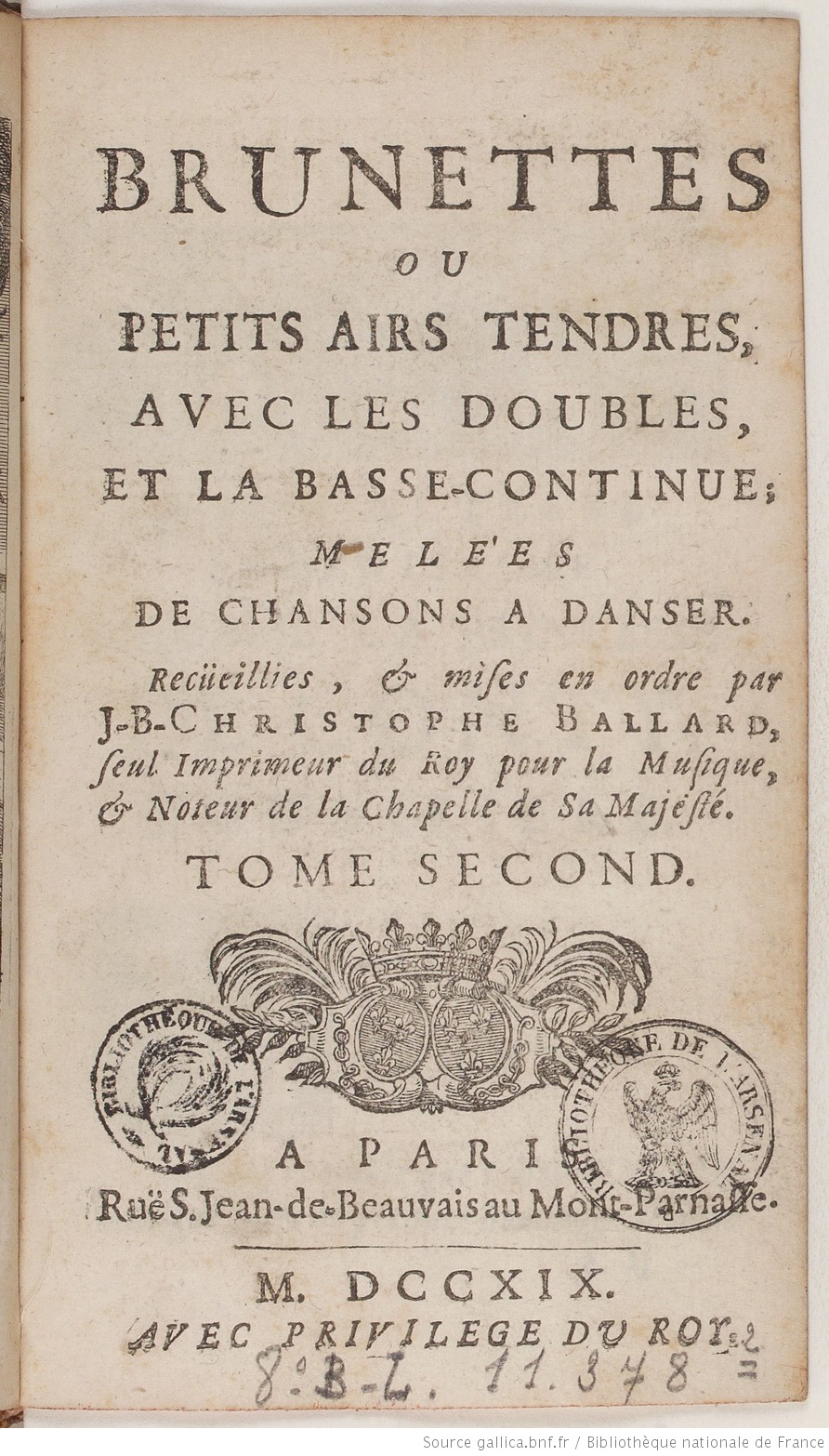

The brunette is a French song form popular in the late seventeenth and eighteenth centuries. Among those who worked in the form was Jacques Hotteterre, who published a collection of flute arrangements of airs and brunettes around 1721. The main source we have for these brunettes is a set of three volumes titled “Brunetes ou petits airs tendres” dated 1703, 1704, and 1711. They were published in duodecimo by Christophe Ballard.
