= Sébastien Le Camus =

French composer

Sébastien Le Camus (ca. 1610-1677) was a French composer. He entered into the service of Louis XIII in 1640 and became intendant de la musique to Gaston d'Orléans in 1648.
