= Rogue's Gallery: Pirate Ballads, Sea Songs, and Chanteys =

Rogue's Gallery: Pirate Ballads, Sea Songs and Chanteys

Compilation album by various artists
- Released: August 22, 2006 (US); August 21, 2006 (UK)
- Recorded: 2004–2006
- Genres: Folk; Sea shanty
- Length: Disc 1: 77:27; Disc 2: 79:53; Total length: 157:20
- Label: ANTI-
- Producer: Hal Willner

Professional ratings
Review scores
Source	Rating
AllMusic	4.5/5 stars

Rogue's Gallery: Pirate Ballads, Sea Songs and Chanteys is a compilation album of sea shanties produced by Hal Wilner. Songs are performed by artists representing a variety of genres, ranging from pop musicians like Sting, Bono, Jarvis Cocker, Lou Reed, Nick Cave and Bryan Ferry, to actors like John C. Reilly and Johnny Depp, to folk musicians like Richard Thompson, Loudon Wainwright III and Martin Carthy.

== Track listing ==
=== Disc one ===
No.	Title	Artist	Length
1.	"Cape Cod Girls"	Baby Gramps	7:14
2.	"Mingulay Boat Song"	Richard Thompson	4:13
3.	"My Son John"	John C. Reilly	1:38
4.	"Fire Down Below"	Nick Cave	2:50
5.	"Turkish Revelry"	Loudon Wainwright III	4:21
6.	"Bully in the Alley"	Three Pruned Men (The Virgin Prunes)	2:30
7.	"The Cruel Ship's Captain"	Bryan Ferry	3:35
8.	"Dead Horse"	Robin Holcomb	2:54
9.	"Spanish Ladies"	Bill Frisell	2:22
10.	"Coast of High Barbary"	Joseph Arthur	4:02
11.	"Haul Away Joe"	Mark Anthony Thompson	4:10
12.	"Dan Dan"	David Thomas	0:50
13.	"Blood Red Roses"	Sting	2:44
14.	"Sally Brown"	Teddy Thompson	2:54
15.	"Lowlands Away"	Rufus Wainwright & Kate McGarrigle	3:25
16.	"Baltimore Whores"	Gavin Friday	4:40
17.	"Rolling Sea"	Eliza Carthy	4:49
18.	"The Mermaid"	Martin Carthy & The UK Group	2:23
19.	"Haul on the Bowline"	Bob Neuwirth	1:29
20.	"A Dying Sailor to His Shipmates"	Bono	4:44
21.	"Bonnie Portmore"	Lucinda Williams	3:36
22.	"Shenandoah"	Richard Greene & Jack Shit	2:58
23.	"The Cry of Man"	Mary Margaret O'Hara	3:06
Total length:			77:27

=== Disc two ===
No.	Title	Artist	Length
1.	"Boney Was a Warrior"	Jack Shit	1:55
2.	"Good Ship Venus"	Loudon Wainwright III	3:15
3.	"Long Time Ago"	White Magic	2:35
4.	"Pinery Boy"	Nick Cave	3:15
5.	"Lowlands Low"	Bryan Ferry & Antony	2:35
6.	"One Spring Morning"	Akron/Family	5:25
7.	"Hog Eye Man"	Martin Carthy & Family	2:44
8.	"The Fiddler"	Ricky Jay & Richard Greene	1:34
9.	"Caroline and Her Young Sailor Bold"	Andrea Corr	3:58
10.	"Fathom the Bowl"	John C. Reilly	3:44
11.	"Drunken Sailor"	David Thomas	3:44
12.	"Farewell Nancy"	Ed Harcourt	6:06
13.	"Hanging Johnny"	Stan Ridgway	3:28
14.	"Old Man of the Sea"	Baby Gramps	5:18
15.	"Greenland Whale Fisheries"	Van Dyke Parks	4:41
16.	"Shallow Brown"	Sting	2:30
17.	"The Grey Funnel Line"	Jolie Holland	4:53
18.	"A Drop of Nelson's Blood"	Jarvis Cocker	7:10
19.	"Leave Her Johnny"	Lou Reed	5:30
20.	"Little Boy Billy"	Ralph Steadman	5:33
Total length:			79:53

== Producers ==
- Hal Willner
- Gore Verbinski
- Johnny Depp
- Brett Gurewitz
- Graham Sutton

== Son of Rogues Gallery ==
A follow-up album Son of Rogues Gallery: Pirate Ballads, Sea Songs & Chanteys was released 19 February 2013.
