= Beer, Beer, Beer =

Drinking song

"Beer, Beer, Beer", also titled "An Ode to Charlie Mops - The Man Who Invented Beer" and "Charlie Mops", is a folk song originating in Britain and Ireland. The song is often performed as a drinking song and is intended as a tribute to the mythical inventor of beer, Charlie Mops. It was also a song used in the game "The Bard's Tale."

== History ==
It is not known where the song was created. There are numerous theories as to where in the British Isles it originated from. It is often held to have been created in Irish pubs, but others put its creation in the 1800s in music halls in the British Isles. Another theory holds that it is an English folk song passed down through the years. It was originally published commercially in volume 10 of English folk magazine Sing as well as later Sing Out!, the American equivalent. It was noted that the three pubs mentioned in the song are based in London along the River Thames. In 1956, the song was taken to Australia, presumably by English sailors, and became popular there but in Melbourne, the lyrics were changed so that it was performed differently to the rest of the world. This was due to Peter Francis of the New South Wales Bush Music Club altering the words and adding a new verse to it to make it a distinctly Australian variation of the original British lyrics. As a result of this, there is sometimes an erroneous assumption in Europe that "Beer, Beer, Beer" is of Australian origin. When it was published in Sing Out!, only two verses of the song were published. In response, a New Zealand reader of Sing Out! sent the magazine a copy of the new Australian verse to be republished. In the United States, the song was performed there, titled as "Charlie Mopps" but was noted to have similar titles to other drinking songs such as "Champagne Charlie" and "Willie the Weeper" with similar themes of praising alcohol.

"Beer, Beer, Beer" has been recorded a number of times by singers including the Clancy Brothers and Marc Gunn. In the Netherlands, "Beer, Beer, Beer" was released as a single in 1970 by the Cocktail Trio after the Australian version of the song had been brought to the attention of their manager. The song was also included in the 2004 video game, The Bard's Tale where it is performed by drunken patrons in the first pub in the game.

=== Charlie Mopps ===
"Beer, Beer, Beer" is based around Charlie Mopps (also spelled as Charlie Mops), the fictional inventor of beer. His name is presumed to rhyme with barley and hops, two of the main ingredients in beer. He therefore is praised for his creation in "Beer Beer Beer". The character has been described in print media relating to "Beer, Beer, Beer" as "one of Mankind's greatest benefactors". "Beer, Beer, Beer" has also been the inspiration for the name of a number of pubs, which have named themselves after Charlie Mopps.
