= Arne Halgjem =

Norwegian temperance activist

Arne Halgjem (14 July 1871 – 17 January 1927) was a Norwegian temperance activist.

He was born in Os Municipality in Søndre Bergenhus county. After graduating from Stord Teachers' College in 1891, he was a schoolteacher in places such as Haugesund, Søgne and Bygland, working to propagate Landsmål. He was a schoolteacher until 1913, when he became director of Statens Filmkontroll to stamp out film censorship in Norway.

Halgjem was a city councillor in Haugesund. As a temperance activist, Halgjem was a grand templar of IOGT from 1906 to 1918. He chaired the umbrella organization Avholdsfolkets Landsnemnd from 1912 to 1914 and 1918 to 1927. His latter chairmanship spanned most of the prohibition era in Norway, in which his organizations helped win the 1919 Norwegian prohibition referendum. From 1921 to 1926 Halgjem was editor-in-chief of the nationwide temperance newspaper Folket. Prohibition in Norway ended with the 1926 Norwegian continued prohibition referendum. He was also one of the main

Halgjem did not seek re-election as chairman of Avholdsfolkets Landsnemnd, and was succeeded by Johan Hvidsten on 10 January 1927. On 17 January, Halgjem died in his home in Ullevål Hageby.
