= John Marsh (minister) =

American minister

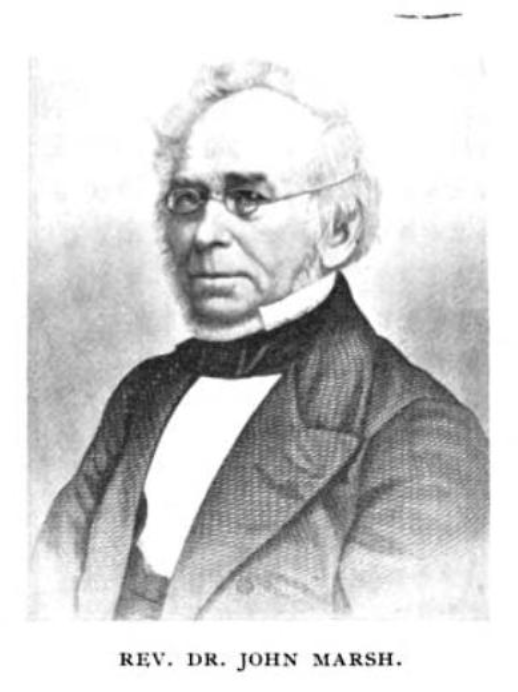
John Marsh

John Marsh (April 2, 1788 – August 4, 1868) was an American minister and temperance advocate.

== Life ==
Marsh was born, April 2, 1788, in Wethersfield, Conn., where his father, John Marsh, D.D., was for forty-seven years pastor of the First Congregational Church. His mother was Ann, daughter of Capt. Ebenezer Grant, of East Windsor, Conn. His eldest brother, Ebenezer Grant Marsh, died in 1803, when Tutor and Professor-elect of Languages of Yale College.

When only ten years old, John Marsh, Jr., became a pupil of Azel Backus of Bethlehem; at twelve he entered Yale College, and graduated at 16 in 1804. After teaching for some years, he began to preach at the age of 21. On December 16, 1818, he was ordained pastor of the Congregational Church in Haddam, Connecticut, where he remained until April 1, 1833. He interested himself in the cause of temperance; in May, 1829, the Connecticut Temperance Society was organized, and Mr. Marsh appointed Secretary and General Agent. In the winter of 1831–2, he spent three months in Baltimore and Washington in behalf of the cause, and in 1833 was invited to leave his pastoral charge in order to act as agent of the American Temperance Society. He moved to Philadelphia, where he resided until 1838.

In October 1836, Marsh became Secretary of the re-organized American Temperance Union and Editor of its new monthly Journal of the American Temperance Union, and continued to be thus employed until 1865, when a new organization took the place of the old, and the Journal was discontinued. The office of the Society was moved to New York City, in 1837. In 1846 he visited Europe, as a delegate to the World's Temperance Convention at London. The degree of D D. was conferred upon him by Jefferson College, Pa., in 1852.

The week before his last illness Marsh undertook an agency for completing the funds necessary to the erection of a building for the Theological Department of Yale College. On July 30, 1868, he fell into an unconscious state, from which he awoke the next day paralyzed. With little suffering he lingered until Aug. 4, when he died at his house in Brooklyn, N. Y., aged eighty years and four months.

== Works ==
At Haddam Marsh published an Epitome of Ecclesiastical History, designed for the young, of which sixteen editions were printed. His publications and addresses on the subject of Temperance were numerous, the most extensive being his autobiography Temperance Recollections (New York), published in 1866.

- An Epitome of General Ecclesiastical History: From the Earliest Period to the Present Time (New York, 1828)
- Putnam and the wolf, or, the monster destroyed : an address delivered at Pomfret, Con., October 28, 1829, before the Windham Co. Temperance Society (Hartford, 1830)
- Boy's Temperance Book (New York, 1848)
- Marsh's temperance anecdotes. A choice collection of more than two hundred temperance anecdotes; accumulating through twenty years illustrating the evils of temperance and the power of the pledge; with topics, facts, and statistics useful to temperance lecturers (New York, 1848)
- A half century tribute to the cause of temperance : an address delivered at New Paltz, before the Ulster County Temperance Society, January 8, 1851 (New York, 1851)
- The Triumphs of Temperance: A Discourse (New York, 1855)
- Temperance Recollections: Labors, Defeats, Triumphs. An Autobiography (New York, 1866)

== Family ==
Marsh's wife, a daughter of Lt Gov. Tallmadge of N. Y., died in 1852; two sons and three daughters survived him.
