= Cold Water Army =

Cold Water Army may refer to:

- Cold Water Army (rock band)
- Cold Water Army (temperance organization)
