= American Temperance Society =

Former American society (established 1826)

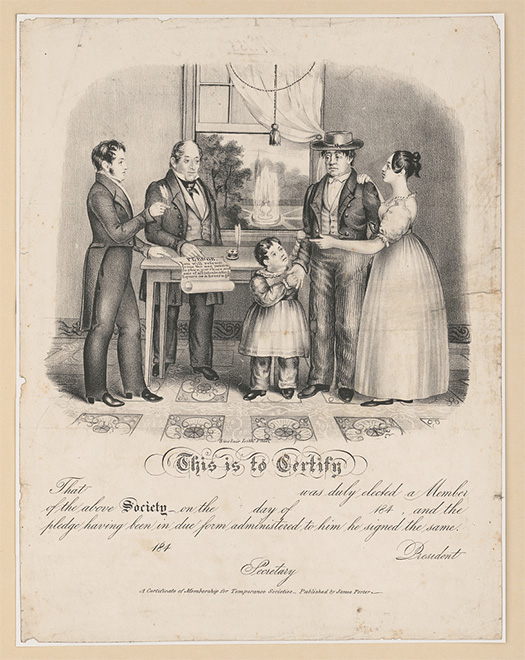
- 1841 certificate
- Region served: United States
- Official language: English

The American Temperance Society (ATS), also known as the American Society for the Promotion of Temperance, was a society established on February 13, 1826, in Boston, Massachusetts. Within five years there were 2,220 local chapters in the U.S. with 170,000 members who had taken a pledge to abstain from drinking distilled beverages, though not including wine and beer; it permitted the medicinal use of alcohol as well. Within ten years, there were over 8,000 local groups and more than 1,250,000 members who had taken the pledge.

The society benefited from, and contributed to, a reform sentiment in much of the country promoting the abolition of slavery, expanding women's rights, temperance, and the improvement of society. Possibly because of its association with the abolitionist movement, the society was most successful in northern states.

After a while, temperance groups increasingly pressed for the mandatory prohibition of alcohol rather than for voluntary abstinence. The American Temperance Society was the first U.S. social movement organization to mobilize massive and national support for a specific reform cause. Their objective was to become the national clearinghouse on the topic of temperance. Within three years of its organization, ATS had spread across the country.

== Notable people ==
- Dr. Justin Edwards, preacher and treasurer of ATS
- Rev. Joshua Leavitt, Lawyer, editor, writer, publisher, first secretary of ATS.
- John Wheeler Leavitt

== See also ==
- American Temperance Union
- Prohibition in the United States
- Temperance movement
- Woman's Christian Temperance Union
- Volstead Act
- Cold Water Army (temperance organization)
