= Australian Home Companion and Band of Hope Journal =

Newspaper

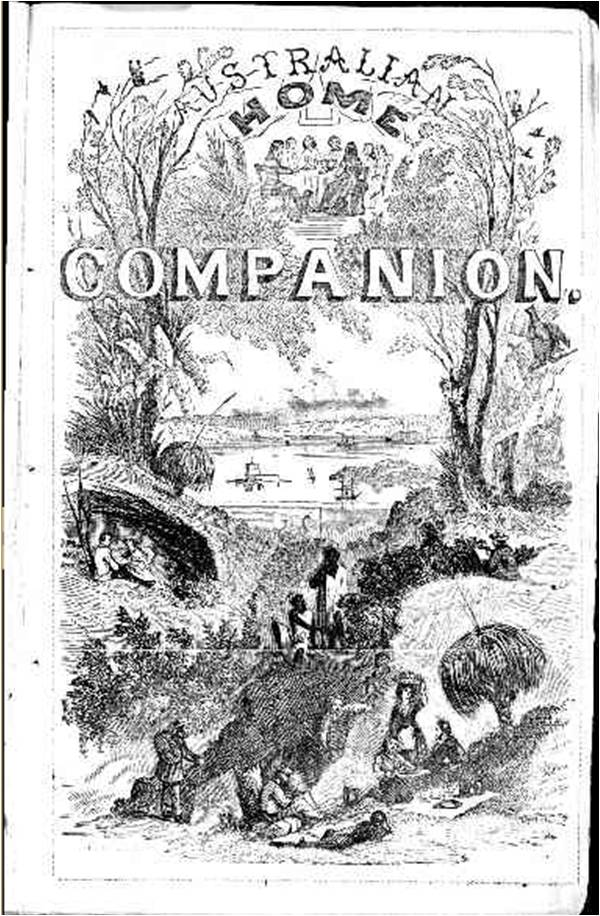
Australian Home Companion and Band of Hope Journal 1 January 1859

The Australian Home Companion and Band of Hope Journal, also published as the Australian Band of Hope Review, and Children's Friend, The Australian Band of Hope Journal, and The Band of Hope Journal and Australian Home Companion, was a Fortnightly English language newspaper published in Sydney, Australia from 1856 to 1861.

== History ==
The paper was established to promote temperance among young people. It was published as the Australian Band of Hope Review, and Children's Friend in 1856, The Australian Band of Hope Journal in 1857, and The Band of Hope Journal and Australian Home Companion in 1858. From 1859 to 1861 it was published as The Australian Home Companion and Band of Hope Journal.

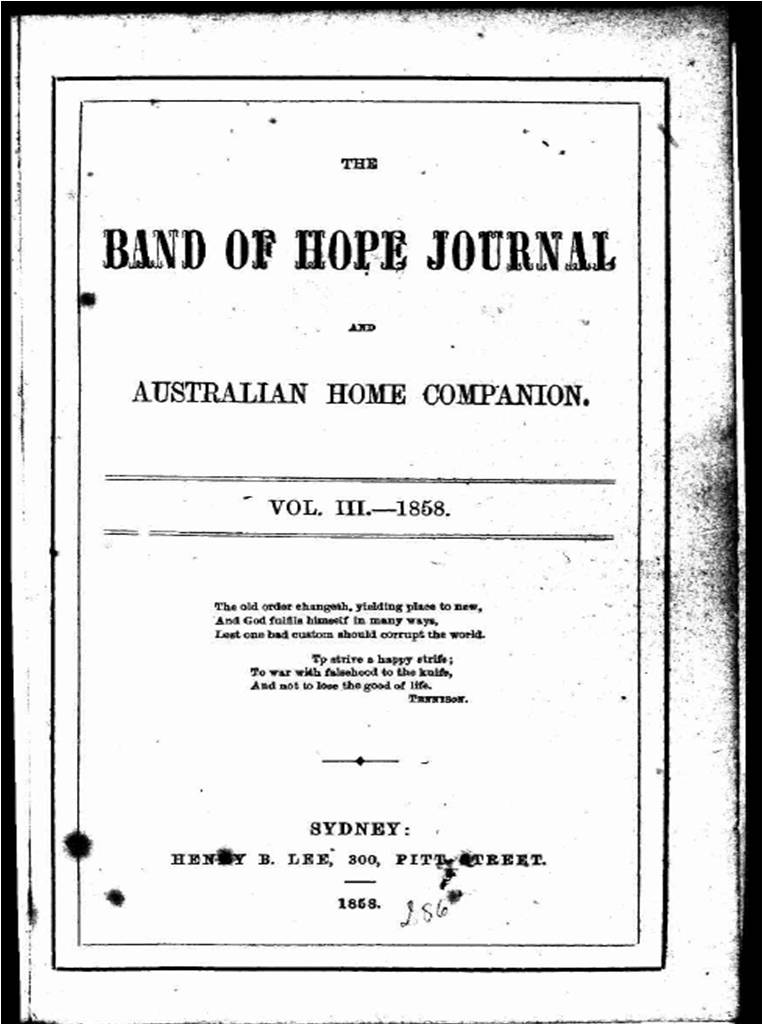
Band of Hope Journal and Australian Home Companion 2 January 1858

== Digitisation ==
The paper has been digitised as part of the Australian Newspapers Digitisation Program project of the National Library of Australia. It was digitised in June 2011, in the first collaboration between the Digitisation and Photography Branch of the National Library of Australia and the Australian Newspapers Digitisation Program team.

== See also ==
- List of newspapers in Australia
- List of newspapers in New South Wales
- George B. Mason and The Australian Home Companion and Band of Hope Journal
