= Alcohol Beverage Control Act =

Parliament of Thailand
- Territorial extent: Thailand
- Passed by: National Assembly of Thailand
- Passed: 28 November 2007
- Enacted: 13 February 2008
- Royal assent: Bhumibol Adulyadej
- Signed: 6 February 2008
- Commenced: 14 February 2008
- Status: In force

The Alcohol Beverage Control Act B.E. 2551 is a prohibitionary act that controls the sale of alcohol beverages in Thailand by, controlling advertising and sales promotion, controlling places where alcoholic beverages are prohibited from being sold, specifying times when sales are prohibited, prohibiting sales to certain types of persons, and controlling consumption.

== Additional amendments ==
At the 30th House of Representatives meeting on 27 March 2024, the meeting voted to accept in principle the first reading of the Alcohol Beverage Control Bill (No. ..) B.E. .... in total of 5 versions by a vote of 389–9, 2 abstentions and 1 abstention. Along with setting up a 42-person special committee to consider this bill, using the Cabinet's draft as the main consideration. The gist of this is the cancellation of Revolutionary Council Announcement No. 253 and National Council for Peace and Order Leader Order No. 22/2015.

The most talked about section is Section 32, which stipulates that the control of alcohol advertising is too extreme, does not solve the problem, and is outdated. It will be amended to allow advertisers to provide facts but not boast, and to specify the scope of content that can be advertised and must not be aimed at children and young people under 20 years of age. At the 24th meeting of the House of Representatives (second regular session of the year) on 19 March 2025, the meeting unanimously approved the Alcohol Beverage Control Bill by 365–0 votes, with 3 abstentions. For the draft amendment to Section 32, the meeting voted to disagree with the special committee's proposal to maintain the original draft that prohibited advertising of alcohol beverages by a vote of 371–1, allowing the promotion of alcohol beverages, especially liquor and beer. Before being forwarded to the Senate for further consideration.

Then, in the 26th Senate meeting (second annual ordinary session) on March 31, 2025, the meeting voted to accept the Alcohol Beverage Control Bill in principle by a vote of 139–1, with 2 abstentions. Along with setting up a special committee of 27 people to amend within 7 days.

On August 4, 2025, at the 8th Senate meeting (first regular session of the year), the Senate approved the Alcoholic Beverage Control Draft by a vote of 105–2, with 12 abstentions and 1 abstention before sending the Draft back to the Cabinet to be submitted for royal endorsement for enactment into law.
