= American Temperance Union =

A national temperance union called the American Society for the Promotion of Temperance was formed in Boston in 1826. Shortly thereafter, a second national temperance union was organized called the American Temperance Society, which grew to 2,200 known societies in several U.S. states, including 800 in New England, 917 in the Middle Atlantic states, 339 in the South, and 158 in the Northwest. In 1836 in a meeting in Saratoga Springs, New York the two groups merge to form the American Temperance Union, introducing the principle of total abstinence or "teetotalism". Congregationalist minister John Marsh was a leading figure in the ATU, acting as corresponding secretary and editor of the Journal of the American Temperance Union from 1837 until its dissolution in 1866.

The official publication of the union was the Journal of the American Temperance Union. The union and its publication were influential in promoting the temperance movement.

== See also ==
- American Temperance Society

== Sources ==
- Christian Chronicler
