= Gudbrandsdalens Folkeblad =

Norwegian newspaper

Gudbrandsdalens Folkeblad was a Norwegian newspaper, published in Lillehammer in Oppland county. It was named Gudbrandsdal Folkeblad from January 1930.

It started on 30 September 1909 as the organ of the Labour Democrats, in other words the non-socialist workers' movement. It was published daily and cooperated with another newspaper in the county, Velgeren, with administration such as printing. It was edited by Ole Petter Johansen until his death in 1934. It stopped when Johansen died, but resurfaced on 1 October 1937. It finally went defunct after its last issue on 19 December 1942, having been published out of Oslo since 1938.
