= Cold Water Army (temperance organization) =

American temperance organization for children

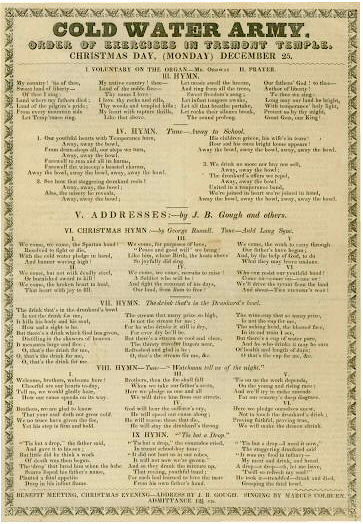
- poster (1843)
- Formation: 1839
- Founder: Thomas Poage Hunt
- Type: Non-governmental organization, Non-profit organization
- Purpose: Temperance movement
- Region served: U.S.; Canada

Cold Water Army was an American temperance organization for children. It was established in 1839 by Rev. T. P. Hunt, who was affiliated with the American Temperance Society (ATS). (Note: According to Cherrington, it was founded about 1835.) In its day, hundreds of thousands of children belonged to the society. The movement attained its height in 1843, but interest was diminished by the Washingtonian movement, whose members absorbed almost the whole attention of the temperance movement community. Yet for several years, these youthful organizations continued to exist in various locations. Even as late as 1862, some of these societies were known to be active.

== Early history ==
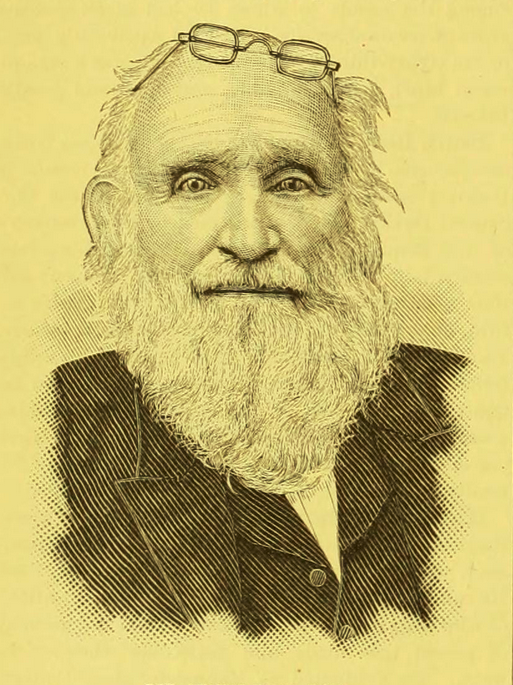
Thomas Poage Hunt

Around 1835, the "Cold Water Army" originated with Rev. Thomas P. Hunt, a Presbyterian minister of Pennsylvania, a noted temperance lecturer and the first lecturer in favor of Total Abstinence. He preached to both parents and children on the idea of saving the young from an intemperate life. He was considered to be a quaint and amusing speaker; his addresses were keen and forcible, yet generally within the comprehension of his youthful audience. The children had frequent picnics, wore badges, carried banners in their processions, and sang songs, which were of no less interest to the parents who generally met with them, than to the children.

Hunt's child pledge of Total Abstinence was thought to be the first generally circulated pledge of the kind. (Note: Cherrington cites Cary's The National Temperance Offering.) That early pledge was set to music, and was sung at the meetings:—

"This youthful band
Do with our hand
The pledge now sign-
To drink no Wine,
Nor Brandy red
To turn the head,
Nor Whiskey hot
That makes the sot,
Nor fiery Rum
To turn our home
Into a hell,
Where none can dwell,
Whence peace would fly,
Where hope would die,
And love expire
'Mid such a fire:-
So here we pledge perpetual bate
To all that can intoxicate.”

During Hunt's travels over the country, he tried to organize a Cold Water Army society in every Sunday School which he visited. Though hundreds of units were formed, there was no attempt to effect a central control of the movement. In 1838, soon after the formation of the Massachusetts Temperance Union, they embraced the idea of educating the young in the principles of total abstinence by organizing the children into "Cold Water Armies." While there had been juvenile temperance societies and other associations among children and youth for many years, the Cold Water Army differed from them in several respects. The former had Constitutions and By-Laws, Presidents, Secretaries, and other officers, but this set-up was sometimes found to be too complicated for long continuance. Nor did this arrangement contain, in itself, sufficient force to spread it as widely as the temperance movement required. By contrast, the Constitution of the Cold Water Army was its "Pledge." Its officers were the Leader and such other adult persons as may have been necessary for supervision and assistance in conducting the meetings.

== Growth ==
The organization grew rapidly. The Army sent large and enthusiastic delegations to the public temperance meetings held from 1837 to 1844 on the Fourth of July and Washington's Birthday.

The popular name of "Cold Water Army" was adopted in the State of Massachusetts where 40,000 were enrolled. In Connecticut and New Jersey, they spread through the agency of Rev. C. J. Warren and T. B. Segur. In Sunday schools all over the States, they became generally introduced. For a time, during the first half of the nineteenth century, the Army had a membership of about 200 boys and girls among the Cherokee Indians. Scomp records its activity in Georgia in 1843, and stated that most of the Cold Water Army of Savannah enlisted for service in the Civil War, but few survived.

The first city in Canada to become involved in the society's work was Montreal in August 1842, established by Mr. Wadsworth. Five years later, the society there numbered 5,000. After spreading throughout the Province and into adjoining sections, interest declined. Other societies that were better organized and more efficient replaced this branch of the Cold Water Army.

A paper was published for two or three years, called the Cold Water Army.

== Accoutrements ==
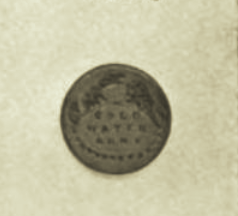
Cold Water Army uniform button

Youthful soldiers paraded in their white and blue uniforms, waving their inscribed banners, and singing temperance songs. A Cold Water Army uniform button from Springfield, Massachusetts, of 1843, was characterized as solid, flat, gilt, 14. On the polished surface, an eagle, incised, head to left, was positioned above an oval upon into which were cut the words "Cold Water Army," a word to a line. There was an ornamental border to lower half of oval.

The badge of the army was a satin ribbon, on which was the picture of a fountain, and also a procession of the army marching to a grove, where a collation was to be served.

== In Print ==
Intended for children, the Cold Water Army and Youth's Picnic was a small, four page weekly periodical, of three columns, and about fourteen inches long. It was published at No. 9 Cornhill by the Massachusetts Temperance Union. It was likely established in September 1841. Five numbers were issued in October 1841 by a Mr. Shepard. It had a fountain as a vignette and a picture representing a procession of children marching with banners. William S. Damrell was the printer, and Nathan Crosby its editor for some period of its existence. About 15,000 copies were printed the first year. It became a monthly magazine, which was included in every Sunday school library. Its duration was 20 years.

== Pledge ==
The following is the pledge which was taken by members of the Cold Water Army: (Note: Cherrington cites Stearns' Temperance in All Nations.)

Trusting in help from Heaven above,
We pledge ourselves to works of love,
With hearts and hands united stand
To spread a blessing o’er the land,
And now resolve we will not take,
Nor give, nor buy, nor sell, nor make.
Through all the years of mortal life
Those drinks which cause pain, woe, and strife —
Rum, Brandy, Whisky, Cordials fine,
Gin, Cider, Porter, Ale, and Wine.
