= 1926 Norwegian continued prohibition referendum =

- 18 October 1926

Results
| Choice | Votes | % |
|---|---|---|
| Yes | 423,031 | 44.34% |
| No | 531,084 | 55.66% |
| Valid votes | 954,115 | 99.33% |
| Invalid or blank votes | 6,467 | 0.67% |
| Total votes | 960,582 | 100.00% |
| Registered voters/turnout | 1,482,724 | 64.78% |
- Results by county

A consultative and facultative referendum on continuing with prohibition was held in Norway on 18 October 1926. Partial prohibition had been effective since 1917, and following a 1919 referendum, spirits and dessert wine had also been banned.

Partially caused by pressure from France, which saw its exports of alcoholic beverages fall, a referendum was organised to decide whether prohibition should be continued. Popular support for prohibition fell in all counties. It was overwhelmingly rejected in and around Oslo, as well as in other urban areas like Bergen. As a result, the law was abolished and prohibition brought to an end.

== Newspaper endorsements ==
| Newspaper | Endorsed |
|---|---|
| Trondhjems Adresseavis | Against |
| Lillehammer Tilskuer | Against |
| Romsdals Amtstidende | Against |
| Jarlsberg og Larviks Amtstidende | Against |
| Romsdalsposten | Against |
| Dagen | For |
| Aftenposten | Against |
| Gudbrandsdalens Folkeblad | For |
| Morgenbladet | Against |
| Christianssands Tidende | Against |
| Dagsposten | Against |
| Halden | For |
| Vestlandske Tidende | Against |
| Asker og Bærums Budstikke | Against |
| Nordlandsposten | Against |
| Dagsposten | Against |

== Results ==
| Choice | Votes | % |
|---|---|---|
| For | 423,031 | 44.34 |
| Against | 531,084 | 55.66 |
| Total | 954,115 | 100.00 |
| Valid votes | 954,115 | 99.33 |
| Invalid/blank votes | 6,467 | 0.67 |
| Total votes | 960,582 | 100.00 |
| Registered voters/turnout | 1,482,724 | 64.78 |
Source: Nohlen & Stöver

=== By county ===
| County | Continue prohibition votes (%) |
|---|---|
| Østfold | 42.8 |
| Akershus | 17.1 |
| Oslo | 13.0 |
| Hedmark | 24.0 |
| Oppland | 39.9 |
| Buskerud | 26.4 |
| Vestfold | 28.3 |
| Telemark | 53.4 |
| Aust-Agder | 66.0 |
| Vest-Agder | 69.0 |
| Rogaland | 73.1 |
| Hordaland | 70.9 |
| Bergen | 32.8 |
| Sogn og Fjordane | 71.3 |
| Møre og Romsdal | 77.2 |
| Sør-Trøndelag | 48.1 |
| Nord-Trøndelag | 59.0 |
| Nordland | 50.6 |
| Troms | 56.7 |
| Finnmark | 52.0 |
