= L'Alarme: société française d'action contre l'alcoolisme =

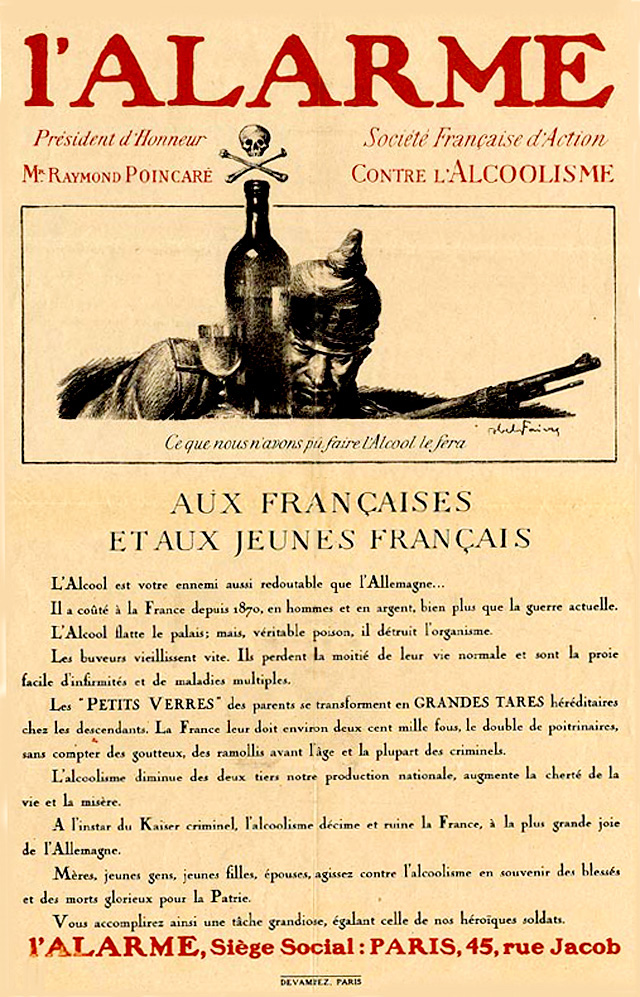
L'Alarme

L'Alarme: société française d'action contre l’alcoolisme was a movement in France, inaugurated in January 1914, under the auspices of the Ligue national contre l'alcoolisme (French National League Against Alcoholism), to bring public sentiment for increased restrictions upon the liquor traffic to bear upon the election of candidates for the Chamber of Deputies.

== Origin ==
It owed its origin to the defeat by the Chamber of Deputies, in February 1912, of a bill, which had been pending for thirteen years, for the limitation of the number of drink-shops. The rejection of the bill had been followed by official protests not only from the Ligue nationale contre l'alcoolisme, but from the Académie nationale de médecine, from departmental committees on hygiene, and from many philanthropic and public health organizations, and had evoked a memorial signed by 250,000 French women. As the period for elections approached, a committee of action (Comite d'action anti-alcoolique) was organized; and this body, under the name L'Alarme, inaugurated a systematic campaign of large meetings to rouse public sentiment and to influence candidates for election.

The plan was financed by Léonard Rosenthal, a native of Holland. The chair of the committee was Henri Schmidt, leader of the anti-alcohol group in the Chamber of Deputies; and the membership was composed of a considerable number of the administrative council of the Ligue nationale eontre l'alcoolisme. The campaign began in Nancy, France, on January 17, 1914. By the end of March, the principal cities of France had been visited and public meetings had been addressed by Deputy Schmidt, Maurice Bertrand, a lawyer of the Court of Appeal of Paris, and other influential representatives of law, medicine, labor, and the general public.

The next step in the campaign was a manifesto to voters, issued late in March, urging that each candidate for election be asked to sign a statement to the effect that he pledged, if elected, to vote for the laws necessary to check alcoholism. The reforms demanded by L'Alarme and emphasized at the public meetings were three: prohibition of the manufacture and sale of absinth; limitation of the number of selling-places; and suppression of the privilege of home distilling. An appeal to voters was posted in public places:—

(translation from French)
L'Alarme begs all voters to use all their efforts to send to the Chamber deputies determined to carry on an energetic struggle against alcoholism. If four years more should have to pass without the passage of effective laws, the evil would increase, and it would become more difficult every day to end it The cause is just: it is sacred. It is for the health and happiness of the people.

The effect of the movement on the elections was not conspicuous, but it was believed that the campaign was worthwhile from an educational point of view.

In 1916, Edition de "L'Alarme" published Jean Finot. L'Union sacrée contre l'alcoolisme.

In May of that year, a meeting was held at the Sorbonne, under the presidency of Paul Painlevé, Minister of Public Instruction, at which Emile Vandervelde, Minister of State of Belgium, amongst other notables, spoke, and the following resolution was unanimously passed:—

"The three thousand citizens assembled at the Sorbonne on Sunday, May 7th, under the chaimanship of M. Painleve, Ministre de l'Instruction publique, petition Parliament to pass legislative measures of a strong character for the suppression of alcoholism".

This was followed by similar meetings in many of the principal cities of France. In Rouen, a meeting was held where the following was again unanimously passed:—

"The meeting of citizens here present, fully persuaded that if France does not kill alcohol to-day, alcohol will kill France tomorrow, declares its conviction that the evil will be definitively conquered only by the absolute prohibition of the manufacture and sale of all spirituous drinks".

== Reorganization ==
After World War I had broken out and the results of alcoholism were thrown into high relief by war exigencies, L'Alarme was revived, and with a new subtitle, "Société française d'action contre l’alcoolisme", appealed on patriotic grounds for the abolition of the traffic in ardent spirits. Raymond Poincaré, president of France, became honorary president, and Jean Finot, director of La Revue, president of the organization. There was a large honorary committee including Henri Bergson of the Académie Française, Senators Léon Bourgeois and Alexandre Ribot (who was also Minister of Finance), Deputy Jules Siegfried, and former Deputy Joseph Reinach, who had been one of the anti-alcohol leaders in the Chamber of Deputies. The general secretary was Luciana Delpech; and the treasurer was Hector Passega. Jean Finot, however, was the moving force of the organization.

The object of the reorganized society, as stated in the by-laws, was "to combat alcoholism by every moral and practical means". It was to be non-partisan and non-sectarian. Its principles soon became apparent from its proposals. It was opposed to spirituous liquors, but favored the retention of wine, beer, cider, and other fermented liquors and endeavored to enlist in the campaign against spirits the wine-producers and wine-dealers on the ground that, with spirits sold under a high tax or abolished, the wine interests would be the natural beneficiaries.

The committee issued pamphlets, posters, and books, including one by Jean Finot, "Union Sacrée contre l’Alcoolisme", which was a scathing indictment of France’s expenditures in drink in war-time, and of the delinquencies of the Government, especially of certain members of it, in dealing with the traffic in ardent spirits. In 1916, L'Alarme issued a poster with the following statements, "alcohol" meaning "distilled spirits".—

To Frenchwomen and the Young People of France:
1. Alcohol is as formidable an enemy to you as Germany.
2. It has cost France since 1870 in men and in money more than the present war.
3. Alcohol pleases the taste; but, a veritable poison, it destroys the body.
4. Drinkers grow old early. They lose half their normal life and are easy prey to numerous weaknesses and maladies.
5. The "little glasses" of parents are transformed into hereditary weaknesses in their descendants. France has today about 200,000 insane, twice as many consumptives, to say nothing of the victims of gout, scrofula, rickets, premature degeneracy, and the majority of criminals.
6. Alcoholism reduces our productivity two thirds, and increases the cost of living, and misery.
7. Like the criminal Kaiser, alcoholism decimates and ruins France, to the great joy of Germany. Mothers, young people, husbands, fight alcoholism and remember the country's glorious dead and wounded.
8. You will thus accomplish a great task, equaling that of our heroic soldiers.

L'Alarme.

So late as 1919, L'Alarme, as represented by Jean Finot, not only did not oppose fermented liquors, but considered wine and wine-producers among the most powerful forces against ardent spirits, to which the alcoholism opposed by L'Alarme was considered to be due.
