= 1919 Norwegian prohibition referendum =

- 5–6 October 1919

Results
Choice	Votes	%
Yes	489,017	61.61%
No	304,673	38.39%
Valid votes	793,690	99.53%
Invalid or blank votes	3,784	0.47%
Total votes	797,474	100.00%
Registered voters/turnout	1,198,522	66.54%
- Results by county

A referendum on introducing prohibition was held in Norway on 5 and 6 October 1919. Partial prohibition had been in effect since 1917, and the prohibition proposal did not include all types of alcohol, only spirits. The proposal was approved by 61.6% of voters. A second referendum on whether the prohibition should be maintained was held in 1926, resulting in an overturning of the law.

== Results ==
Choice	Votes	%
For	489,017	61.61
Against	304,673	38.39
Total	793,690	100.00
Valid votes	793,690	99.53
Invalid/blank votes	3,784	0.47
Total votes	797,474	100.00
Registered voters/turnout	1,198,522	66.54
Source: Nohlen & Stöver

=== By county ===
County	Votes for (%)
Østfold	65.4
Akershus	33.7
Oslo	21.0
Hedmark	49.2
Oppland	59.4
Buskerud	42.4
Vestfold	49.9
Telemark	72.6
Aust-Agder	76.3
Vest-Agder	77.6
Rogaland	82.1
Hordaland	80.8
Bergen	45.3
Sogn og Fjordane	79.2
Møre og Romsdal	88.0
Sør-Trøndelag	70.0
Nord-Trøndelag	77.8
Nordland	73.2
Troms	74.1
Finnmark	66.9
