= Prohibition =

Outlawing of alcohol

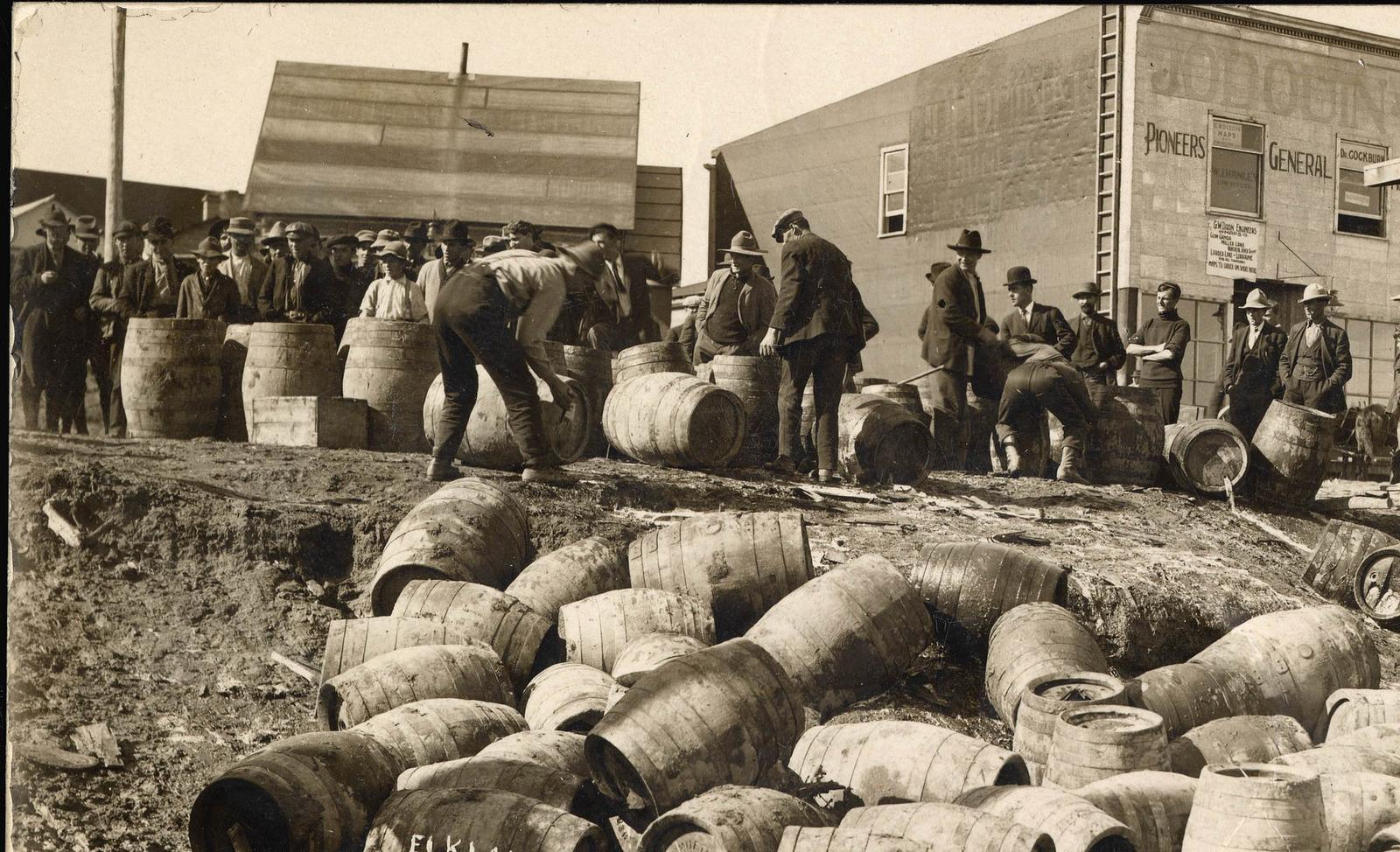
A police raid confiscating illegal alcohol, in Elk Lake, Canada, in 1925

Prohibition is the act or practice of forbidding something by law; when used by itself the term refers to the banning of the manufacture, storage (whether in barrels or in bottles), transportation, sale, possession, and consumption of alcoholic beverages. The word is also used to refer to a period of time during which such bans are enforced.

== History ==
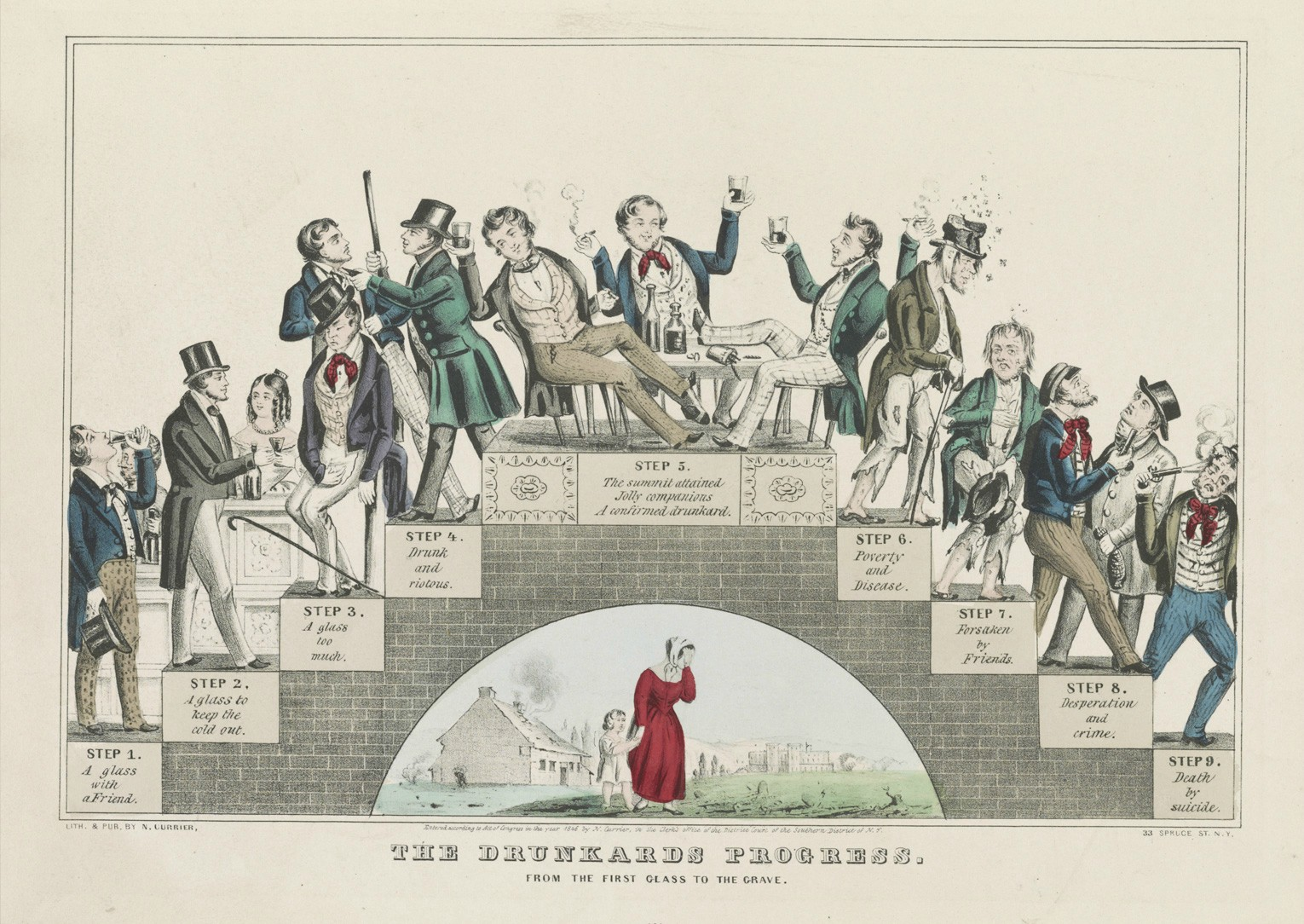
The Drunkard's Progress: A lithograph by Nathaniel Currier supporting the temperance movement, January 1846

Some kind of limitation on the trade in alcohol can be seen in the Code of Hammurabi (c. 1772 BCE) specifically banning the selling of beer for money. It could only be bartered for barley: "If a beer seller do not receive barley as the price for beer, but if she receive money or make the beer a measure smaller than the barley measure received, they shall throw her into the water." A Greek city-state of Eleutherna passed a law against drunkenness in the 6th century BCE, although exceptions were made for religious rituals.

In the early 20th century, much of the impetus for the prohibition movement in the Nordic countries and North America came from moralistic convictions of pietistic Protestants. Prohibition movements in the West coincided with the advent of women's suffrage, with newly empowered women as part of the political process strongly supporting policies that curbed alcohol consumption.

The first half of the 20th century saw periods of prohibition of alcoholic beverages in several countries:

- 1918 to 1920: Prohibition in Canada nationally, as well as in most provinces including:
  - 1901 to 1948 in Prince Edward Island
  - 1919 to 1919 in Quebec
- 1907 to 1992 in the Faroe Islands; limited private imports from Denmark were allowed from 1928
- 1914 to 1925: Prohibition in the Russian Empire and the Soviet Union
- 1915 to 1935: Prohibition in Iceland (wine legal from 1922, but beer still prohibited until 1989)
- 1916 to 1927 in Norway (fortified wine and beer were also prohibited from 1917 to 1923)
- 1919 in the Hungarian Soviet Republic, March 21 to August 1; called szesztilalom
- 1919 to 1932 in Finland (called kieltolaki, 'ban law')
- 1920 to 1933: Prohibition in the United States

After several years, prohibition failed in North America and elsewhere. Rum-running or bootlegging became widespread, and organized crime took control of the distribution of alcohol. Distilleries and breweries in Canada, Mexico and the Caribbean flourished as their products were either consumed by visiting Americans or illegally exported to the United States. Detroit and Chicago became notorious as havens for prohibition dodgers during the time known as the Roaring Twenties – 75% of all alcohol smuggled into the United States crossed the Detroit–Windsor border. Prohibition generally came to an end in the late 1920s or early 1930s in most of North America and Europe, although a few locations continued prohibition for many more years.

In some countries where the dominant religion forbids the use of alcohol, the production, sale, and consumption of alcoholic beverages is prohibited or restricted today. For example, in Saudi Arabia and Libya alcohol is banned; in Pakistan and Iran it is illegal with exceptions.

== Effects ==
Generally, prohibition is not completely effective, and tends to drive the market underground instead. Most countries which have maintained long-standing alcohol bans have predominantly Muslim populations whose religious beliefs forbid them from drinking, but the broad popularity of alcohol has meant prohibition is extremely difficult to enforce in most nations. The vast majority of countries which have at one point fully prohibited alcohol have since reversed it. Both the United States and Soviet Union implemented total bans on alcohol only to repeal them after less than 15 years.

== Prohibition worldwide ==
=== Africa ===
==== Nigeria ====
In the British colony of Nigeria, missionary forces demanded prohibition of liquor, which proved highly unpopular. Both Africans and British found illegal supplies such as secret stills, obtaining colonial liquor permits, and smuggling. The experiment began in 1890 and was repealed in 1939.

==== South Africa ====
During the coronavirus outbreak of 2020, alcohol sales, and even the transportation of alcohol outside of one's home, was made illegal. This order came into effect during the nationwide lockdown on 27 March 2020. The purpose of the ban was intended to prevent drunken fights, reduce domestic violence, stop drunk driving, and eliminate the weekend binge drinking so prevalent across South Africa.

Police, medics, and analysts estimate—conservatively—that alcohol is involved in, or responsible for, at least 40% of all emergency hospital admissions. By reducing the number of people within hospitals, and of course within social gatherings, the goal of prohibition was to reduce the rate of transmission, and thus slow the spread of the virus.

A 2022 study found that the alcohol prohibition reduced injury-induced mortality by at least 14% (a conservative estimate) and sharply reduced violent crime.

=== South Asia ===
==== Afghanistan ====
Sale of alcohol is illegal in Afghanistan.

==== Bangladesh ====
In Bangladesh, alcohol is somewhat prohibited due to its proscription in the Islamic faith. The purchase and consumption is still allowed in the country. The Garo tribe consume a type of rice beer, and Christians in this country drink and purchase wine for their holy communion.

==== India ====
In India alcohol is a state subject and individual states can legislate prohibition, but currently most states do not have prohibition and sale/consumption is freely available in 24 out of 29 states. Prohibition is in force in the states of Mizoram, Gujarat, Bihar and Nagaland, parts of Manipur, and the union territory of Lakshadweep. All other states and union territories of India permit the sale of alcohol.

Election days and certain national holidays such as Independence Day are meant to be "dry days" when liquor sale is not permitted but consumption is allowed. Some Indian states observe dry days on major religious festivals/occasions depending on the popularity of the festival in that region.

==== Maldives ====
The Maldives ban the import of alcohol, x-raying all baggage on arrival. Alcoholic beverages are available only to foreign tourists on resort islands and may not be taken off the resort.

==== Pakistan ====
Pakistan allowed the free sale and consumption of alcohol for three decades from 1947, but restrictions were introduced by Zulfikar Ali Bhutto just weeks before he was removed as prime minister in 1977. Since then, only members of non-Muslim minorities such as Hindus, Christians and Zoroastrians are allowed to apply for alcohol permits. The monthly quota is dependent upon one's income, but is actually about five bottles of liquor or 100 bottles of beer. In a country of 180 million, only about 60 outlets are allowed to sell alcohol. The Murree Brewery in Rawalpindi was once the only legal brewery, but today there are more. The ban officially is enforced by the country's Council of Islamic Ideology, but it is not strictly policed. Members of religious minorities, however, often sell their liquor permits to Muslims as part of a continuing black market trade in alcohol.

==== Sri Lanka ====
In 1955 Sri Lanka passed a law prohibiting adult women from buying alcohol. In January 2018, Finance Minister Mangala Samaraweera announced that the law would be amended, allowing women to legally consume alcohol and work in venues that sell alcohol. The legalization was overruled by President Maithripala Sirisena several days later.

=== West Asia ===
==== Iran ====
Since the 1979 Islamic Revolution, Muslims are banned from selling and drinking alcohol but some people trade and sell it illegally. Home production by religious minorities (Zoroastrians, Jews, and Christians) is legal.

==== Kuwait ====
The consumption, importation and brewing of, and trafficking in liquor is strictly against the law in Kuwait.

==== Saudi Arabia ====
The sale, consumption, importation and brewing of, and trafficking in liquor is strictly against the law in Saudi Arabia.

==== Yemen ====
Alcohol is banned in Yemen.

=== Southeast Asia ===
==== Brunei ====
In Brunei, alcohol consumption and sale is banned in public. Non-Muslims are allowed to purchase a limited amount of alcohol from their point of embarcation overseas for their own private consumption, and non-Muslims who are at least the age of 18 are allowed to bring in not more than two bottles of liquor (about two litres) and twelve cans of beer per person into the country.

==== Indonesia ====
Alcohol sales in Indonesia are banned in small shops and convenience stores.

==== Korea ====
During the Joseon period, laws prohibiting the drinking of alcohol were frequently promulgated when there were major droughts, crop failures, or famines. The purpose of such bans was to appease the wrath of heaven, and to save food and money (since rice was used to make alcohol). A ban was issued almost every year during King Taejong's reign and frequently during the reigns of King Seongjong and King Yeonsangun. It was banned again, in 1758 (the 34th year of King Yeongjo). The bans usually occurred during spring and summer when the droughts were severe.

==== Malaysia ====
Alcohol is banned for Muslims in Malaysia due to its Islamic faith and sharia law. Nevertheless, alcoholic products can easily be found in supermarkets, specialty shops, and convenience stores all over the country for non Muslims. Non-halal restaurants also typically sell alcohol.

==== Philippines ====
There are only restrictions during elections in the Philippines. Alcohol is prohibited to be sold, furnished, offered, bought, or taken on the day prior to an election and on the day of an election itself. Hotels and restaurants may secure a prior exemption but even then they are only allowed to serve alcohol to non-Filipino citizens. Private consumption of alcohol hoarded prior to the ban period is tolerated. The Philippine Commission on Elections may opt to extend the liquor ban. In the 2013 elections, there was a proposal that it be extended to five days. This was overturned by the Supreme Court.

Other than election-related prohibition, alcohol is freely sold to anyone above the legal drinking age of 18.

==== Thailand ====
Alcohol sales are prohibited during elections from 18:00 the day prior to voting, until the end of the day of voting itself. Alcohol is also prohibited on major Buddhist holy days, and sometimes on royal commemoration days, such as birthdays.

Thailand also enforces time-limited bans on alcohol on a daily basis. Alcohol can only be legally purchased in stores or restaurants between 11:00 and midnight. The law is enforced by all major retailers (most notably 7-Eleven) and restaurants, but is frequently ignored by the smaller mom-and-pop stores. Hotels and resorts are exempt from the rules.

The consumption of alcohol is also banned at any time within 200 metres (660 ft) of a filling station (where sale of alcohol is also illegal), schools, temples or hospitals as well as on board any type of road vehicle regardless of whether it is being consumed by the driver or passenger.

At certain times of the year—Thai New Year (Songkran) is an example—the government may also enforce arbitrary bans on the sale and consumption of alcohol in specific public areas where large scale festivities are due to take place and large crowds are expected.

Thailand strictly regulates alcohol advertising, as specified in the Alcohol Beverage Control Act, B.E. 2551 (2008). Sales of alcohol via "electronic channels" (internet) are prohibited.

=== Europe ===
==== Czech Republic ====
On 14 September 2012, the Government of the Czech Republic banned all sales of alcoholic drinks with more than 20% alcohol. From this date, it was illegal to sell such alcoholic beverages in shops, supermarkets, bars, restaurants, filling stations, e-shops, etc. This measure was taken in response to the wave of methanol poisoning cases resulting in the deaths of 18 people in the Czech Republic. Since the beginning of the "methanol affair" the total number of deaths has increased to 25. The ban was to be valid until further notice, though restrictions were eased towards the end of September. The last bans on Czech alcohol with regard to the poisoning cases were lifted on 10 October 2012, when neighbouring Slovakia and Poland allowed its import once again.

==== Nordic countries ====
The Nordic countries, with the exception of Denmark, have had a strong temperance movement since the late-1800s, closely linked to the Christian revival movement of the late-19th century, but also to several worker organisations. As an example, in 1910 the temperance organisations in Sweden had some 330,000 members, which was about 6% of a population of 5.5 million. This heavily influenced the decisions of Nordic politicians in the early 20th century.

In 1907, the Faroe Islands passed a law prohibiting all sale of alcohol, which was in force until 1992. Very restricted private importation from Denmark was allowed from 1928 onwards.

In 1914, Sweden put in place a rationing system, the Bratt System, in force until 1955. A referendum in 1922 rejected an attempt to enforce total prohibition.

In 1915, Iceland instituted total prohibition. The ban for wine was lifted in 1922 and spirits in 1935, but beer remained prohibited until 1989 (circumvented by mixing light beer and spirits).

In 1916, Norway prohibited distilled beverages, and in 1917 the prohibition was extended to also include fortified wine and beer. The wine and beer ban was lifted in 1923, and in 1927 the ban of distilled beverages was also lifted.

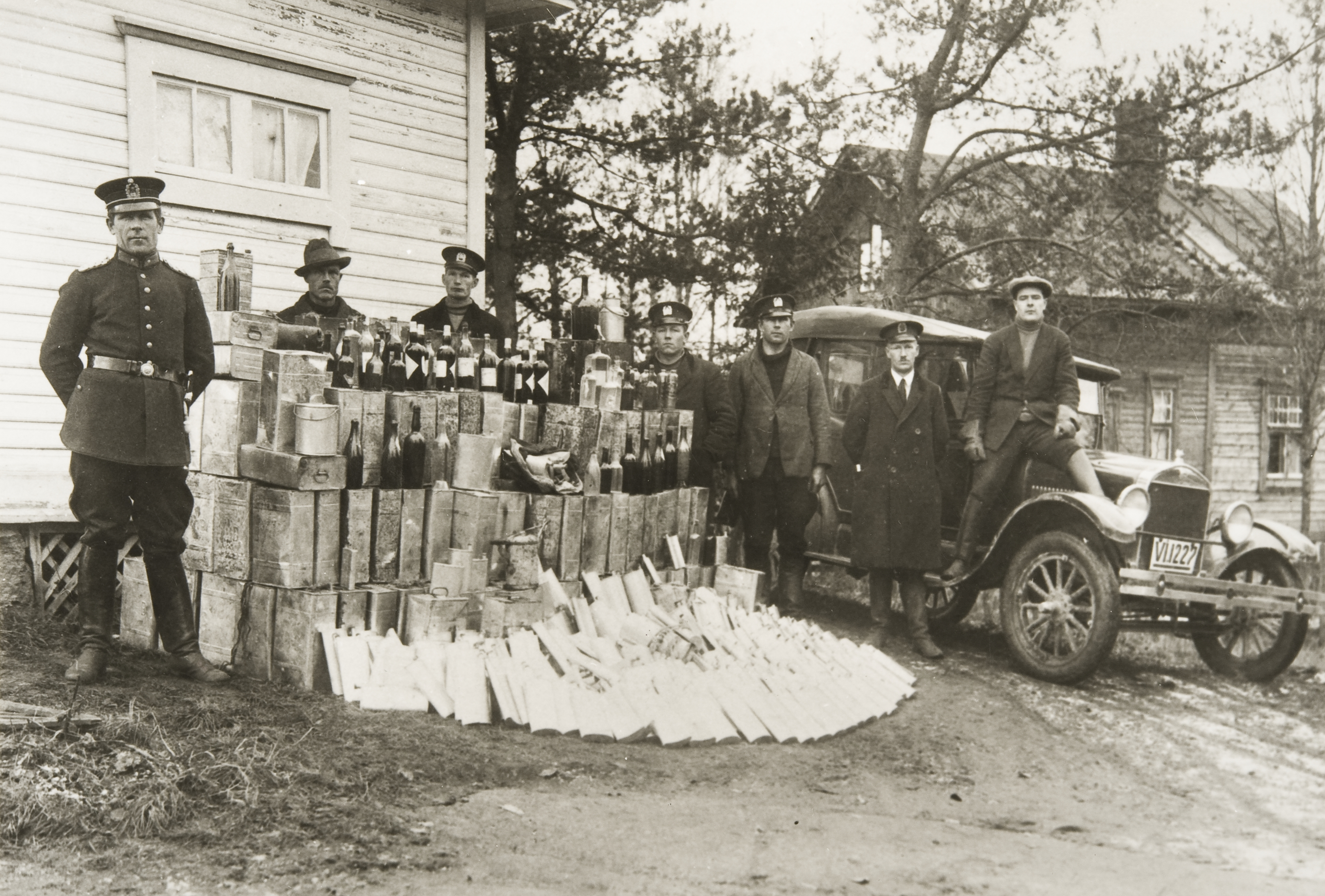
Confiscated alcohol in Finland c. 1920s

In 1919, Finland enacted prohibition, as one of the first acts after independence from the Russian Empire. Four previous attempts to institute prohibition in the early twentieth century had failed due to opposition from the tsar. After a development similar to the one in the United States during its prohibition, with large-scale smuggling and increasing violence and crime rates, public opinion turned against the prohibition, and after a national referendum where 70% voted for a repeal of the law, prohibition was abolished in early 1932.

Today, all Nordic countries except Denmark continue to have strict controls on the sale of alcohol, which is highly taxed (dutied) to the public. There are government monopolies in place for selling spirits, wine, and stronger beers in Norway (Vinmonopolet), Finland (Alko), Sweden (Systembolaget), Iceland (Vínbúðin), and the Faroe Islands (Rúsdrekkasøla Landsins). Bars and restaurants may, however, import alcoholic beverages directly or through other companies.

Greenland, which is part of the Kingdom of Denmark, does not share its easier controls on the sale of alcohol. Greenland has (like Denmark) sales in food shops, but prices are typically high. Private import when travelling from Denmark is only allowed in small quantities.

==== Russian Empire and the Soviet Union ====
In the Russian Empire, a limited version of a Dry Law was introduced in 1914. It continued through the turmoil of the Russian Revolution of 1917 and the Russian Civil War into the period of Soviet Russia and the Soviet Union until 1925.

==== United Kingdom ====
Although the sale or consumption of commercial alcohol has never been prohibited by law in the United Kingdom, various groups in the UK have campaigned for the prohibition of alcohol, including the Society of Friends (Quakers), the Methodist Church and other non-conformists, and temperance movements such as Band of Hope and temperance Chartist movements of the nineteenth century. The village of Bournville traditionally remains a dry town with no pubs due to the founder John Cadbury's Quaker beliefs and wish for it to remain free of alcohol for the workers at his Cadbury's chocolate factory.

Formed in 1853 and inspired by the Maine Liquor Law in the United States, the United Kingdom Alliance aimed at promoting a similar law prohibiting the sale of alcohol in the UK. This hard-line group of prohibitionists was opposed by other temperance organisations who preferred moral persuasion to a legal ban. This division in the ranks limited the effectiveness of the temperance movement as a whole. The impotence of legislation in this field was demonstrated when the Sale of Beer Act 1854, which restricted Sunday opening hours, had to be repealed, following widespread rioting. In 1859, a prototype prohibition bill was overwhelmingly defeated in the House of Commons.

On 22 March 1917, during the First World War at a crowded meeting in the Queen's Hall in London (chaired by Alfred Booth), many influential people, including Agnes Weston, spoke, or letters from them were read out, against alcohol consumption, calling for prohibition; General Sir Reginald Hart wrote to the meeting that "Every experienced officer knew that practically all unhappiness and crime in the Army is due to drink". At the meeting, Lord Channing said that it was a pity that the whole Cabinet did not follow the example of King George V and Lord Kitchener when in 1914 those two spoke calling for complete prohibition for the duration of the war.

Edwin Scrymgeour served as Member of Parliament for Dundee between 15 November 1922 and 8 October 1931. He remains the only person to have ever been elected to the House of Commons on a prohibitionist ticket. In 1922, he defeated incumbent Liberal member Winston Churchill; winning the seat for the Scottish Prohibition Party, which he had founded in 1901, and for which he had stood for election successfully as a Dundee Burgh Councillor in 1905 and unsuccessfully as a parliamentary candidate between 1908 and 1922.

=== North America ===
==== Canada ====
Indigenous peoples in Canada were subject to prohibitory alcohol laws under the Indian Act of 1876. Sections of the Indian Act regarding liquor were not repealed for over a hundred years, until 1985.

An official, but non-binding, federal referendum on prohibition was held in 1898. Prime Minister Wilfrid Laurier's government chose not to introduce a federal bill on prohibition, mindful of the strong antipathy in Quebec. As a result, Canadian prohibition was instead enacted through laws passed by the provinces during the first 20 years of the 20th century, especially during the 1910s. Canada did, however, enact a national prohibition from 1918 to 1920 as a temporary wartime measure. Much of the rum-running during prohibition took place in Windsor, Ontario. The provinces later repealed their prohibition laws, mostly during the 1920s, although some local municipalities remain dry.

==== Mexico ====
Some communities in the southern Mexican state of Chiapas are under the control of the libertarian socialist Zapatista Army of National Liberation, and often ban alcohol as part of what was described as "a collective decision". This prohibition has been used by many villages as a way to decrease domestic violence and has generally been favored by women. This prohibition, however, is not recognized by federal Mexican law as the Zapatista movement is strongly opposed by the federal government.

The sale and purchase of alcohol is prohibited on and the night before certain national holidays (Fiestas Patrias), such as the birthdate of Benito Juárez and Día de la Revolución, which are meant to be dry nationally. The same "dry law" applies to the days before presidential elections every six years.

==== United States ====
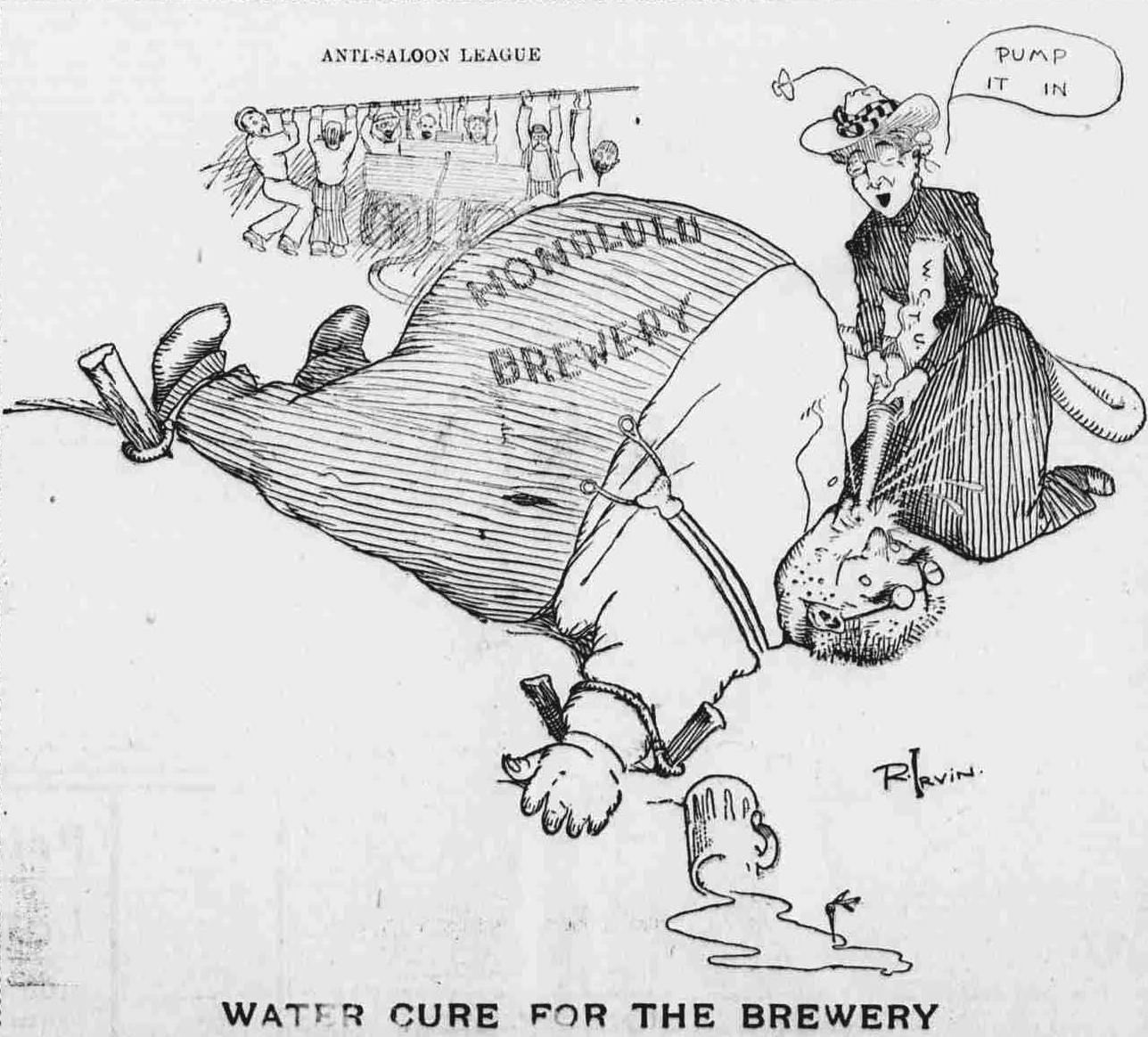
This 1902 illustration from the Hawaiian Gazette shows the Anti-Saloon League and the Woman's Christian Temperance Union's campaign against beer brewers. The "water cure" was a form of torture that was in the news because of its use in the Philippines.

Prohibition in the United States focused on the manufacture, transportation, and sale of alcoholic beverages; exceptions were made for medicinal and religious uses. Alcohol consumption was never illegal under federal law. Nationwide Prohibition did not begin in the United States until January 1920, when the Eighteenth Amendment to the U.S. Constitution went into effect. The Eighteenth amendment was ratified in 1919, and was repealed in December 1933 with the ratification of the Twenty-first Amendment.

Aside from bootlegging, medicinal alcohol from a physician was the only legal way to sell, and or obtain, alcohol. This stemmed from the fact that medicinal alcohol was necessary for products used by medical professionals. It was a important in things such as tonics, stimulants, preventive measures, and a cure for infections. In current times, using alcohol for such things seems counter intuitive however, back in the 1920s during prohibition, alcohol was believed to have healing properties as well as beneficial properties to people. Pharmacists of the time even found that alcohol was a useful diluent and solvent for multiple herbal formulations. In order for physicians to make some extra cash, physicians began making claims that alcohol was an effective medicine to 27 different medical issues. According to Garrett Peck, author of The Prohibition Hangover: Alcohol in America from Demon Rum to Cult Cabernet, he states, "Medicinal alcohol was a popular loophole in the Volstead Act, the Prohibition enforcement law". It was such a large business during prohibition that an estimated 15,000 prescribers applied for alcohol prescriptive permits in just the first six months of Prohibition.

Concern over excessive alcohol consumption began during the American colonial era, when fines were imposed for drunken behavior and for selling liquor without a license. In the mid-19th century evangelical Protestants denounced drinking as sinful and demanded the prohibition of the sale of beer, wine and liquor. Apart from Maine, they had limited success until the early 20th century. By the 1840s the temperance movement was actively encouraging individuals to immediately stop drinking. However, the issue of slavery, and then the Civil War, overshadowed the temperance movement until the 1870s.

Prohibition was a major reform movement from the 1870s until the 1920s, when nationwide prohibition went into effect. It was supported by evangelical Protestant churches, especially the Methodists, Baptists, Presbyterians, Disciples of Christ, Congregationalists, Quakers, and Scandinavian Lutherans. Opposition came from Catholics, Episcopalians, and German Lutherans. The Women's Crusade of 1873 and the Woman's Christian Temperance Union (WCTU), founded in 1874, were means through which certain women organized and demanded political action, well before they were granted the vote. The WCTU and the Prohibition Party were major players until the 20th century, when the Anti-Saloon League emerged as the movement's leader. By 1913, 9 states had statewide prohibition and 31 others had local option laws in effect. The League then turned their efforts toward attaining a constitutional amendment and grassroots support for nationwide prohibition. The German American community was the base of the beer industry and became a pariah when the U.S. declared war on Germany in 1917. The Eighteenth Amendment to the United States Constitution passed Congress in December 1917 and was ratified by the states in 1919. It prohibited "the manufacture, sale, or transportation of intoxicating liquors within, the importation thereof into, or the exportation thereof". On October 28, 1919, Congress passed the National Prohibition Act, known as the Volstead Act, to implement the new amendment. After a year's required delay, national prohibition began on January 16, 1920.

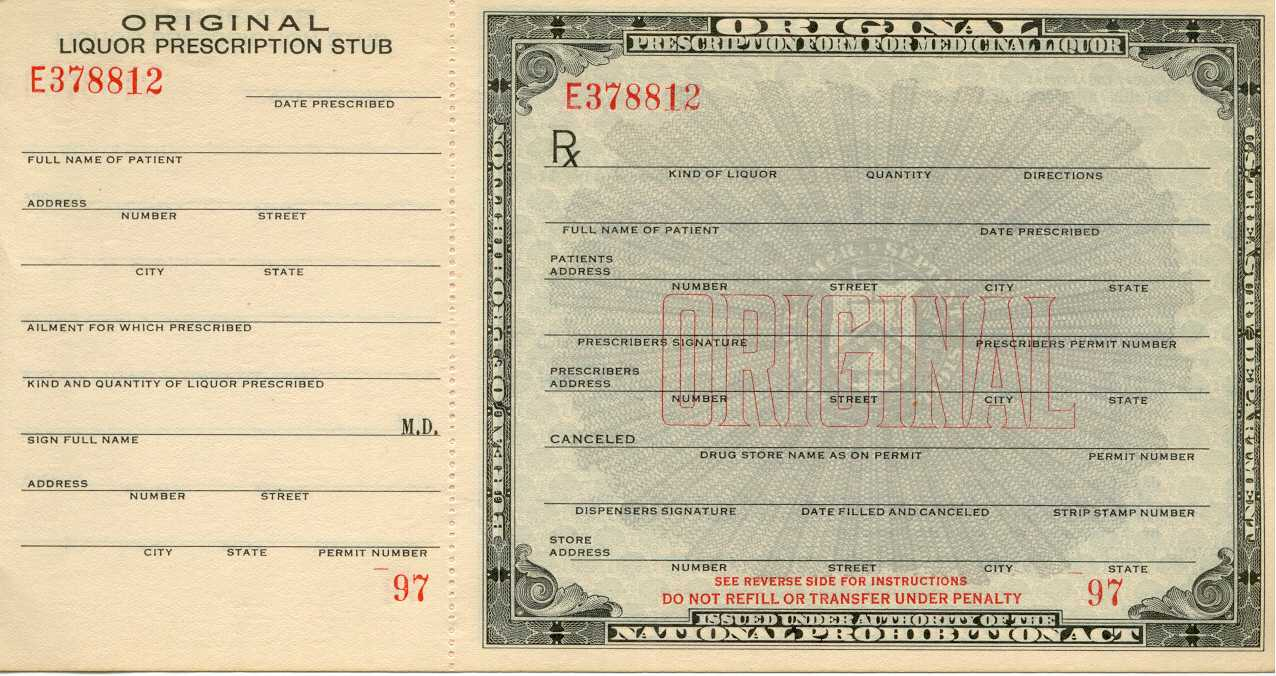
Prescription form for medicinal liquor

Initially, alcohol consumption nosedived to about 30% of its pre-Prohibition levels, but within a few years, the illicit market grew to roughly two-thirds. Illegal stills flourished in remote rural areas as well as city slums, and large quantities were smuggled from Canada. Bootlegging became a major business activity for organized crime groups, under leaders such as Al Capone in Chicago and Lucky Luciano in New York City.

Prohibition lost support during the Great Depression, from 1929. The repeal movement was initiated and financed by the Association Against the Prohibition Amendment, and Pauline Sabin, a wealthy Republican, founded the Women's Organization for National Prohibition Reform (WONPR). Repeal was accomplished with the ratification of the Twenty-first Amendment on December 5, 1933. Under its terms, states were allowed to set their own laws for the control of alcohol, although it remains a heavily regulated commodity at the federal level as well, e.g., with federally established standards of identity for alcoholic beverages, federal licensing of distilleries, federal taxation, and a federal Bureau of Alcohol, Tobacco, Firearms and Explosives enforcement agency.

Between 1832 and 1953, federal legislation prohibited the sale of alcohol to Native Americans, with very limited success. After 1953, Native American communities and reservations were permitted to pass their own local ordinances governing the sale of alcoholic beverages.

In the 21st century, there are still counties and parishes within the United States known as "dry", where the sale of alcohol is prohibited or restricted.

=== South America ===
==== Venezuela ====
In Venezuela, 24 hours before every election, the government prohibits the sale and distribution of alcoholic beverages throughout the national territory, including the restriction to all dealers, liquor stores, supermarkets, restaurants, wineries, pubs, bars, public entertainment, clubs and any establishment that markets alcoholic beverages.

The same is done during Holy Week as a measure to reduce the alarming rate of road traffic accidents during these holidays.

=== Oceania ===
==== Australia ====
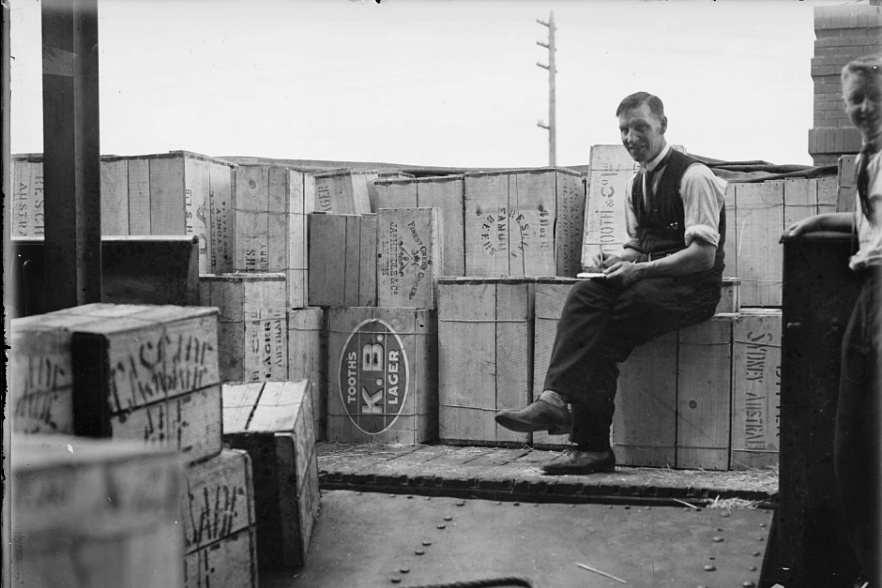
The first consignment of liquor in Canberra, Australian Capital Territory, following the repeal of prohibition laws in 1928

The Australian Capital Territory (then the Federal Capital Territory) was the first jurisdiction in Australia to have prohibition laws. In 1911, King O'Malley, then Minister of Home Affairs, shepherded laws through Parliament preventing new issue or transfer of licences to sell alcohol, to address unruly behaviour among workers building the new capital city. Prohibition was partial, since possession of alcohol purchased outside of the Territory remained legal and the few pubs that had existing licences could continue to operate. The Federal Parliament repealed the laws after residents of the Federal Capital Territory voted for the end of them in a 1928 plebiscite.

Since then, some state governments and local councils have enacted dry areas. This is where the purchase or consumption of alcohol is only permitted in licensed areas such as liquor stores, clubs, cafes, bars, hotels, restaurants, and also private homes. In public places such as streets, parks, and squares, consumption is not permitted, but carrying bottles that were purchased at licensed venues is allowed. Almost all dry areas are small defined districts within larger urban or rural communities.

More recently, alcohol has been prohibited in many remote Indigenous communities. Penalties for transporting alcohol into these "dry" communities are severe and can result in confiscation of any vehicles involved; in dry areas within the Northern Territory, all vehicles used to transport alcohol are seized.

==== New Zealand ====
In New Zealand, prohibition was a moralistic reform movement begun in the mid-1880s by the Protestant evangelical and Nonconformist churches and the Woman's Christian Temperance Union and after 1890 by the Prohibition League. It assumed that individual virtue was all that was needed to carry the colony forward from a pioneering society to a more mature one, but it never achieved its goal of national prohibition. Both the Church of England and the largely Irish Catholic Church rejected prohibition as an intrusion of government into the church's domain, while the growing labor movement saw capitalism rather than alcohol as the enemy.

Reformers hinged their aspiration on the women's vote, in which New Zealand was a pioneer, would swing the balance, but the women were not as well organized as in other countries. Prohibition had a majority in a national referendum in 1911, but needed a 60% vote to pass. The movement kept trying in the 1920s, losing three more referendums by close votes; it managed to keep in place a 6 pm closing hour for pubs and Sunday closing. The Depression and war years effectively ended the movement, but their 6 pm closing hour remained until October 1967 when it was extended to 10 pm.

For many years, referendums were held for individual towns or electorates, often coincident with general elections. The ballots determined whether these individual areas would be "dry" – that is, alcohol could not be purchased or consumed in public in these areas. One notable example was the southern city of Invercargill, which was dry from 1907 to 1943. People wanting alcohol usually travelled to places outside the city (such as the nearby township of Lorneville or the town of Winton) to drink in the local pubs or purchase alcohol to take back home. The last bastion of this 'dry' area remains in force in the form of a licensing trust that still to this day governs the sale of liquor in Invercargill. The city does not allow the sale of alcohol (beer and wine included) in supermarkets unlike in the majority of New Zealand, and all form of alcohol regardless of the sort can only be sold in bars and liquor stores.

Prohibition was of limited success in New Zealand as—like in other countries—it led to organised bootlegging. The most famous bootlegged alcohol in New Zealand was that produced in the Hokonui Hills close to the town of Gore (not coincidentally, the nearest large town to Invercargill). Even today, the term "Hokonui" conjures up images of illicit whisky to many New Zealanders.

== Elections ==
In many countries in Latin America, the Philippines, Thailand, Turkey, India, and several US states, the sale but not the consumption of alcohol is prohibited before and during elections. In Spanish-speaking countries, this is called a Ley Seca ('dry law').

== See also ==
- Bootleggers and Baptists
- Iron law of prohibition
- Legal drinking age
- List of countries with alcohol prohibition
- Prohibition of drugs
- Prohibition Party
- Scottish Prohibition Party
