= Referendums in Sweden =

Since the introduction of parliamentarism in Sweden, six national referendums have been held. Legal provisions for referendums were introduced in 1922, one year after the adoption of universal suffrage. The Constitution of Sweden provides for binding referendums (concerning changes to the constitution), but all referendums held as of 2012 have been non-binding. The latest referendum, on adopting the euro, was held on 14 September 2003.

The Riksdag decides if a referendum is to be held, when it is held, and the wording of the issue on the ballot. Riksdag also interprets the results (sometimes the outcome is not clear cut, e.g. the nuclear power referendum of 1980). Ahead of the 1980, 1994 and 2003 referendums, all the parties with seats in the Riksdag promised to follow the outcome of the vote.

Blank votes (to protest against the proceedings or the way the issue is framed, etc.) are considered valid in Swedish referendums and are tallied.

Since 1980, there have been legal provisions for binding referendums in questions concerning changes to the constitution and the adoption of international treaties that affect constitutional rights and responsibilities. For a binding referendum to happen, one tenth (i.e. 35) of the members of the Riksdag must demand it the first time the change is up for debate in the Riksdag. One third (i.e. 116) of the members must then support the referendum. The referendum then takes place during the next general election. The change to the constitution is rejected if a majority votes it down, and if the number of votes cast against the change number more than half of the votes cast in the general election. If this is not the case, the referendum becomes non-binding and the Riksdag decides whether to follow the outcome or not. Approval of change to the constitution in a referendum of this kind is never binding. As of 2017, no such referendum has been held.

Year	Issue	Turnout	Yes		No	Blank	Result
1922	Prohibition of alcohol	55.1%	49.1%		50.9%	-	Rejection of prohibition
1955	Changing from left- to right-hand traffic	53.0%	15.5%		82.9%	1.6%	Rejection of switching from left-hand to right hand traffic but right-hand traffic was voted in anyway 8 years later.
1957	Tax funded pension system	72.4%	45.8%	15.0%	35.3%	3.9%	Alternative 1 (see below for an explanation)
			Alt. 1	Alt. 2	Alt. 3		
1980	Discontinuation of the use of nuclear power	75.7%	18.9%	39.1%	38.7%	3.3%	Alternative 2 (see below for an explanation)
			Yes		No		
1994	Joining the European Union	83.3%	52.3%		46.8%	0.9%	Approval of membership
2003	Adopting the euro as the currency of Sweden	82.6%	42.0%		55.9%	2.1%	Rejection of the euro

== Referendums ==
=== Prohibition referendum (1922) ===
The first national Swedish referendum, on the prohibition of alcohol, was held on 27 August 1922. The voter turnout was 55.1%, and prohibition was rejected with 51% voting against it. The referendum was held on initiative of the Swedish temperance movements, and although the Riksdag followed the outcome of this non-binding referendum the consumption of alcoholic beverages in Sweden continued to be restricted in other ways (the Bratt System rationing and through the governmental alcohol monopoly Systembolaget among other restrictions). Blank votes were not counted at this time. The outcome was considered an upset victory for those that rejected prohibition as the temperance movements were much more organized and more active in the campaign.

=== Driving side referendum (1955) ===
The second national Swedish referendum was held on 16 October 1955. The two alternatives were to either switch to driving on the right or keep left hand driving. Voter turnout was 53.2%, and 82.9% of the votes were in favor of keeping left hand driving. Only 15.5% voted for switching to right hand traffic. 1.6% of the votes were blank votes. The Riksdag later decided to introduce right hand traffic contrary to the outcome. A bill to this effect was passed in 1963 and the switch took place on 3 September 1967 (Dagen H). The referendum was not binding and it was not stipulated on the ballot how long left hand driving should be kept.

=== Pensions system referendum (1957) ===
The third national Swedish referendum, concerning the form of the Swedish pensions system, was held on 13 October 1957. In this non-binding referendum there were three alternatives:

1. Employees would have the right to supplement their pension in proportion with earnings whilst working and linked to the 15 years in which they had the highest income. The value of the pension would be guaranteed by the government. Those earning income via other means, such as business owners, would have the right to sign up to voluntary supplementary pensions whose value would also be guaranteed by the government. (Suggestion of the Social Democratic Party, also backed by the Communist Party and the Trade Union Confederation)
2. All income earners would have the right to sign up for voluntary pension supplements, whose value would be guaranteed by the government. (Suggestion of the Farmer's League)
3. All income earners would have the right to sign up for voluntary pension supplements, and changes would be made to legislation to ensure their value is maintained without government involvement. The supplements would be open to collective and individual agreements. (Suggestion of the Rightist Party and the People's Party)

72.4% of the eligible voters cast their votes, with alternative 1 garnering the most votes (45.8%), alternative 2 got 15.0% of the votes, and alternative 3 got 35.3% of the votes. 3.9% of the votes were blank. Although alternative 1 did not gain over 50% of the votes, the Social Democratic Party saw the result as a mandate, and implemented alternative 1 in the following years. The split of opinion between the two coalition parties of the Erlander II Cabinet on this issue, where the Farmer's League and the Social Democrats backed different alternatives, led to the dissolution of the coalition and a snap election in 1958. The Farmer's League and the Social Democrats had different opinions about the outcome: the Social Democrats believed that their alternative had won because it garnered the most votes and the Farmer's League believed alternative 1 had been rejected because the other two alternatives had garnered over 50% of the vote.

=== Nuclear power referendum (1980) ===
The fourth national Swedish referendum, concerning the form of discontinuing the use of nuclear power, was held on 23 March 1980. In this non-binding referendum there were three alternatives:

1. Use of nuclear power should be discontinued as economically feasible (backed by the Moderate Party).
2. Use of nuclear power should be discontinued as economically feasible, and any significant power plants in Sweden should be owned by the state or municipalities (backed by the Social Democratic Party and the People's Party).
3. Use of nuclear power should be discontinued in ten years time (backed by the Centre Party, the Left Party - the Communists and Christian Democratic Unity). (Note: Christian Democratic Unity had no seats in the Riksdag at the time.)

There were no alternatives in favor of expanding or retaining the then-current level of use of nuclear power. In spite of this, the Government Chancellery of Sweden writes that alternative 3 was seen as a "no" to nuclear power and alternatives 1 and 2 were seen as "yes" to nuclear power. All parties with seats in the Riksdag promised to follow the outcome of the vote.

The impetus for the referendum was the Three Mile Island accident (28 March 1979) that increased public apprehension of nuclear power. 75.7% of eligible voters cast their votes, with alternative 2 garnering the most votes (39.1%), alternative 3 got 38.7% of the votes, and alternative 1 got 18.9% of the votes. Alternative 1 and 2 were largely similar and the main sticking point for the Moderate Party was that alternative 2 included wording that said that any significant power plants in Sweden should be owned by the state or municipalities. The Moderate Party therefore launched their own alternative, without this text on the ballot. 3.9% of the votes were blank.

Though no time frame for discontinuing the use of nuclear power was given on the ballots of alternative 1 and 2, the results (with a majority in favor of alternatives 1 and 2 that stipulated that this should happen as economically feasible) were interpreted by the Riksdag as that the use of nuclear power should be discontinued at the end of the lifespan of the nuclear reactors, with the last two estimated as expiring in 2010. However, not all nuclear power reactors were shut down by 2010, and that same year the Riksdag approved the building of new reactors to replace old ones. Sweden currently has three operational nuclear power plants, with ten operational nuclear reactors, which produce about 35-40% of the country's electricity. At the time of the referendum, six reactors were operational, with another four completed but not operational, and two under construction.

=== European Union membership referendum (1994) ===
The fifth national referendum, concerning the membership of Sweden in the European Union (EU), was held on 13 November 1994. Voter turnout was 83.3%, and the result was 52.3% in favor of membership and 46.8% against. 0.9% were blank votes. Although non-binding, all parties with seats in the Riksdag promised ahead of time to follow the outcome of the vote. Sweden joined the EU on 1 January 1995 (the government had applied for membership in 1991).

Of the parties with seats in the Riksdag, the Left Party and the Green Party were against membership. The Moderate Party and the Liberal People's Party were largely in favor of membership. Although it was a Social Democratic government that initially applied for membership, the Social Democratic Party was split internally on this question and ultimately took no official position, leaving Social Democratic party members to campaign for or against as they saw fit. The Centre Party and the Christian Democrats similarly left the position on the issue up to the members. Two social movements that were not aligned with any party were active during the referendum campaign: Folkrörelsen Nej till EU ("The Social Movement No to the EU") and Ja till Europa ("Yes to Europe") against and for membership, respectively.

=== Euro referendum (2003) ===
The sixth national referendum, concerning the adoption of the euro currency, was held on 14 September 2003. The voter turnout was 82.6%, and the adoption of the euro was rejected with 55.9% of the votes, with 42.0% voting in favor. There were 2.1% blank votes. Although non-binding, all parties with seats in the Riksdag promised ahead of time to follow the outcome of the vote. As of 2017, Sweden has not adopted the euro, and public opinion against adoption has grown over time.

The Moderate Party, the Liberal People's Party and the Christian Democrats were in favor of adopting the euro. The Social Democratic Party was split and one part of the party campaigned for and another against. The Left Party, the Green Party and the Centre Party were against adoption. Sweden in Europe was the umbrella organization for those in favor of adoption. Folkrörelsen Nej till EU ("The Social Movement No to the EU"), active since before the 1994 referendum on membership in the European Union, was also active against the euro during this referendum.

The murder of Anna Lindh, Social Democratic Minister for Foreign Affairs, on 11 September 2003 led to the suspension of the referendum campaign. After deliberations, the government and the other parties with seats in the Riksdag decided to go ahead with the referendum at the set date, but no further debates or campaigning would take place. The motive behind the murder was not known before the end of the referendum (no one claimed responsibility), but at the time it was assumed that it had been perpetrated to influence the outcome. The perpetrator was apprehended on 16 September, after the vote, and it turned out that the deed had nothing to do with the referendum. According to Statistics Sweden, the official government statistics agency of Sweden, the murder had no effect on the outcome of the referendum. The popularity of Lindh (who had campaigned in favor of adoption) increased after the murder, but this was not reflected in the outcome of the vote to any significant degree.

== Municipal referendums ==
Referendums can be held in a municipality about a local political issue. Such referendums are common, and often held in connection with a general election. There has been up to ten annual municipal referendums. Since 1994 citizens can collect signatures about having a referendum, then with enough number of signatures, the municipality has decide if there shall be one or not. The municipalities in Sweden have comparatively little legislative power, and can't change laws. Local referendums requesting a law change are sometimes held anyway, as political statements to the central government. A well known Swedish municipal referendum is the 1988 Sjöbo referendum where the voters passed a motion to stop refugees seeking asylum from being given housing in the municipality.

== See also ==
- Election Authority
