= Strong beer =

Beer classification

Strong beer is a term for beer that is in some way more potent than regular beer. The concept is only generally used in some countries, and local tax laws often define what constitutes strong beer.

== Strong beer by country ==
=== Finland ===
In Finland, strong beer was usually defined as beer in the tax class IV, or colloquially as "A-beer" (after the tax class IV A), with an alcohol content of a minimum of 4.8% by volume. There were two separate subclasses of the tax class IV, of which IV A had an alcohol content of between 4.8% and 5.8% by volume, and class IV B had an alcohol content of at least 5.9% by volume. These classes no longer have a real meaning in taxation, as the tax classes were abolished in 1995. Therefore the tax classes are shown on Finnish beers only for traditional reasons. For a long time, strong beer was only sold in Alko stores and restaurants, but since 2018 beer with an alcohol content of up to 4.7% can be bought at grocery stores.

=== Sweden ===
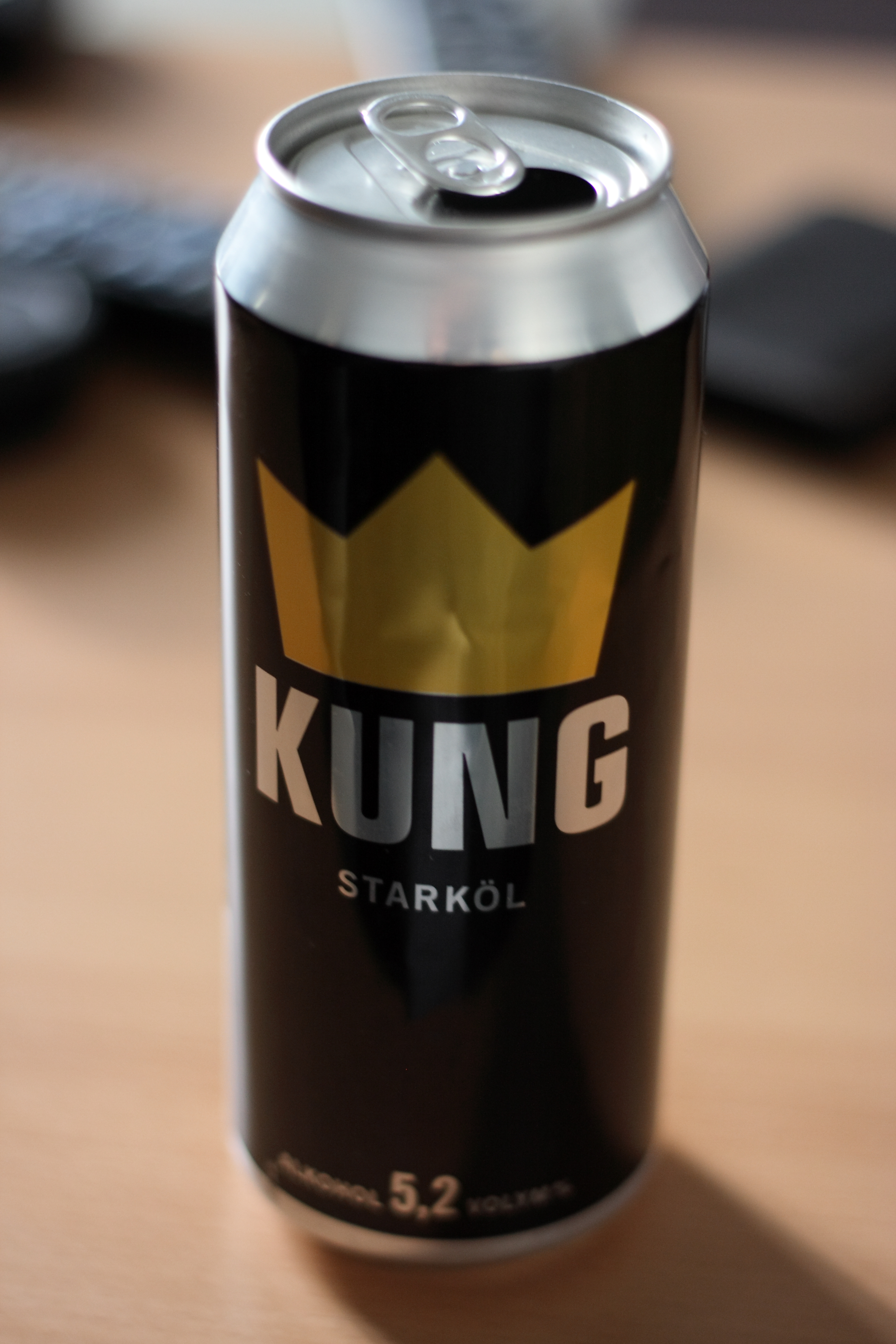
Kung brand beer with an alcohol content of 5.2%.

In Sweden, strong beer is defined as a beer with an alcohol content of over 3.5% by volume, which can be sold only at Systembolaget stores. Since 1 July 1977, this has also included beer classified as mellanöl, which means that before 1 July 1977, strong beer in Sweden was defined as beer of over 4.5% alcohol by volume.

The concept of strong beer was introduced to Sweden in 1955, and most of the beer in Sweden is defined as strong beer and is considered normal on the international market.

==== History ====
In the late 19th century it was typical to produce beer in Sweden in various classes: "Swedish beer" at 2.5% alcohol by weight, small lager beer at 2.6%, small pilsner beer at 3.8%, lager at 4.2% and porter at 6.1%. After a malt tax was introduced in Sweden in 1903, partly because of a similar law had been introduced in Denmark in 1891, malt beverages were divided into three classes after a statutory instrument defined in 1907 about the manufacture and taxation of malt beverages. Class I consisted of malt beverages up to 2.25% alcohol by volume and up to a gravity of 6% and were popularly called svagdricka. Class II consisted of malt beverages of up to 3.6% alcohol and a gravity of up to 9.5% and were popularly called pilsnerdricka. Class III consisted of malt beverages with an alcohol content higher than 3.6% by volume or a gravity higher than 9.5%, and they were popularly just called beer.

Since 1866, there have been various rules for the sale of beer. As well as the Bratt System, successively harsher national regulations for the sales of alcoholic beverages were introduced. The 1917 regulations for the sales of intoxicating beverages contained the same rules for the sales of "real" beer, meaning malt beverages of class III, as for the sales of liquor and wine. After these regulations had been introduced, breweries in Sweden stopped producing malt beverages of class III and instead focused on the weaker pilsnerdricka. The 1919 law about sales of pilsnerdricka concerned the sales of malt beverages of class II with an alcohol content of between 2.25% and 3.6% by volume, and these sales were not as harshly regulated as the sales of wine and liquor.

In 1922, beer sales of class III were forbidden in Sweden, although the 1922 Swedish prohibition referendum in the same year did not completely prohibit sales of intoxicating beverages. The sale of beer in class III remained forbidden until 1955. This prohibition was later called the "prohibition of strong beer" and defined as the maximum alcohol content of beer that could be openly sold being 3.6%. This corresponded to the strength of pilsnerdricka, colloquially called pilsner, which was served at the beer cafés of the time. Beer of class III could still be produced for export, and definitions such as "class III export" or "export beer" remained in use for a long time under the prohibition. Strong beer was still available with a medical prescription at pharmacies, and these prescriptions were widely available despite the prohibition.

Strong beer was introduced in Sweden when beer sales of class III were again allowed in Sweden in 1955. The concept came from an initiative from the 1944 abstinence committee (which was active up to 1953), and the concept of low-alcohol beer for what was previously referred to as svagdricka or pilsnerdricka was introduced at the same time. The Swedish concept of strong beer is, therefore, a relatively new invention with no direct relation to the international beer market, and which was a result of strong beer in Sweden being more potent than the pilsnerdricka that had previously been the strongest beer available in Sweden.

=== Norway ===
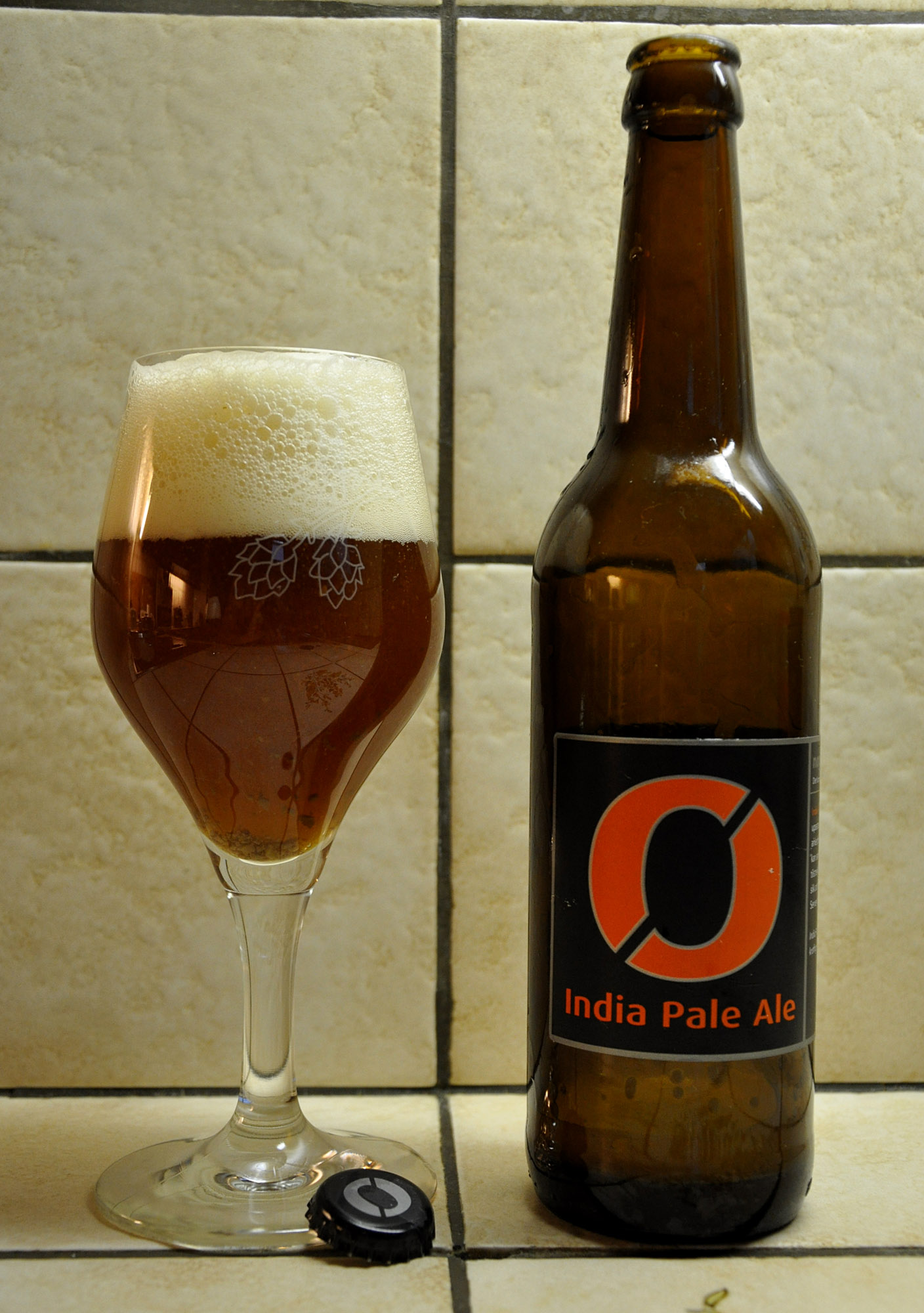
India Pale Ale from the Norwegian brewery Nøgne Ø is a strong beer with an alcohol content of 7.5%.

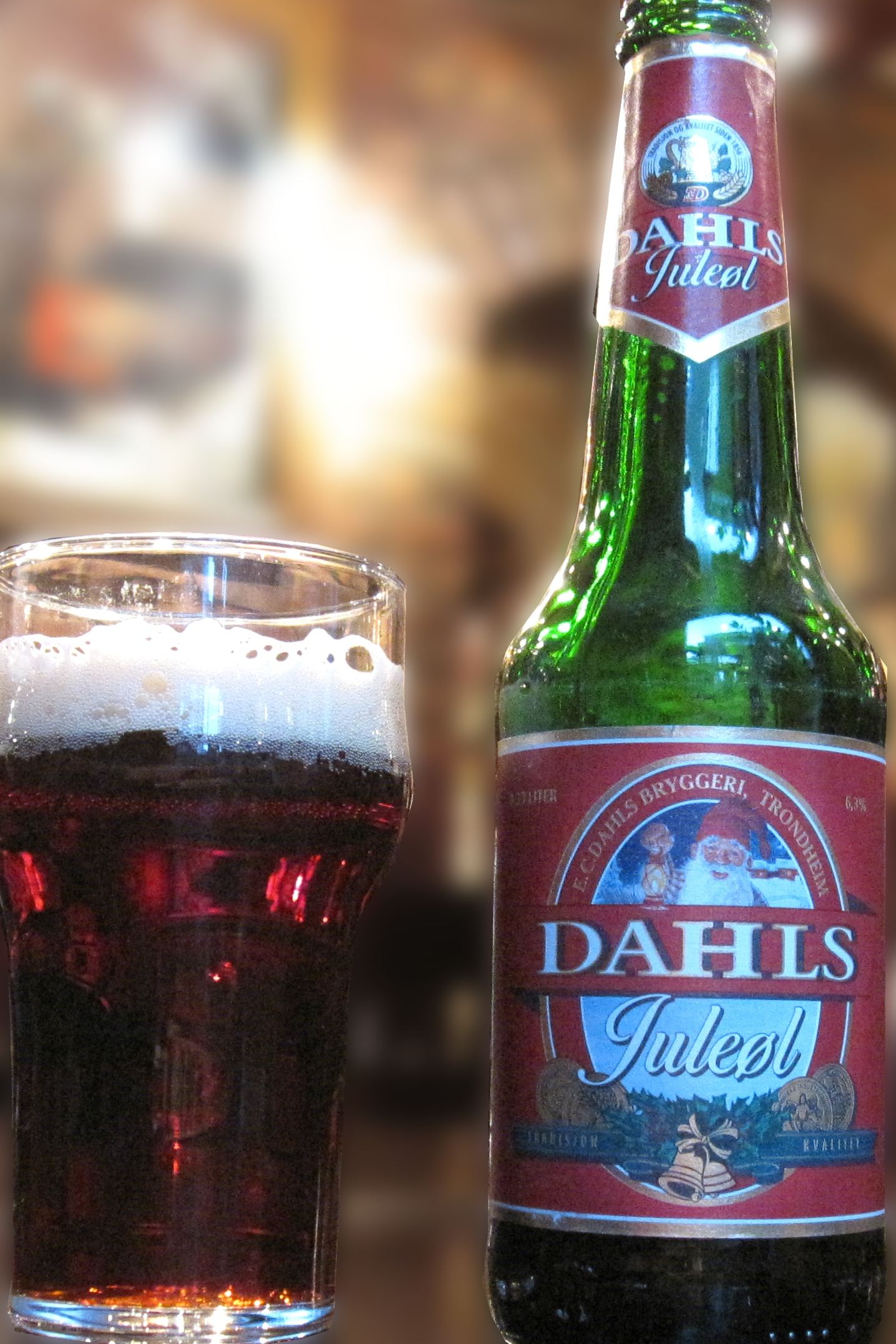
Christmas beer from the E. C. Dahls Brewery with an alcohol content of 6.5%.

In Norway, strong beer is defined as beer with an alcohol content of over 4.7%. The minimum age requirement to buy strong beer is 18 years. In the past, strong beers were either pilsners or bocks. Pilsner was also called "golden beer" or "extra beer".

According to current Norwegian law, strong beer in Norway can only be sold at Vinmonopolet, after a law that came into force on 1 March 1993. This law was part of the agreement that Gro Harlem Brundtland's third cabinet made with the Christian Democratic Party of Norway in order to make the Christian Democratic Party vote for the European Economic Area agreement. Before this, beer of up to 7% alcohol could be sold in grocery stores. One month after the law came into force, strong beer sales had decreased by 90%. The EFTA Court decided in 1997 that it was all right for Vinmonopolet to have a monopoly on the sales of strong beer.

In 1998 Kjell Magne Bondevik's first cabinet allowed Vinmonopolet to sell beer with an alcohol content of over 7%, after pressure from the EFTA overseeing organisation European Free Trade Association Surveillance Authority. After this decision, the Norwegian brewery Ringnes started production of a beer called Ringnes Loaded with an alcohol content of 10.2% in half-litre cans. Because of the beer's name and label, Vinmonopolet refused to sell it, but Ringnes relaunched it under the name Ringnes Eagle. This beer was the most sold strong beer at Vinmonopolet for several years. Since 2005 the most sold strong beer at Vinmonopolet has been Hansa beer.

==== Revenue of strong beer ====
In 1970, strong beer comprised 20% of the total beer sales revenue. In 1980 this had decreased to 14% and in 1992 to 4.5%. Sales of strong beer decreased further in 1990 after a new law came into force. This law defined that strong beer could only be sold from behind the counter, which caused many stores to stop selling strong beer as they could not have a specific beer counter. Sales of strong beer in July 1990 were half of that in July 1989.

A total of about 26 million litres of strong beer were sold in 1986 and 10 million litres in 1992, but only about 2.5 million litres in 1993. In 1995 a total of 1.6 million litres were sold.

=== Germany ===
In Germany, strong beer is defined as beer of a gravity of 16% or higher. This gives the beer an alcohol content of between 5% and 10% by weight. Some strong beers in Germany include Bockbier, Doppelbock and Eisbock. The market share of strong beer in Germany is less than one percent of all beer available on sale.

=== United States ===
In the United States, beer with an alcohol content of over 5% by volume is often legally defined as malt liquor, but the direct linguistic relation to "strong beer" is not used.
