= Munskänkarna =

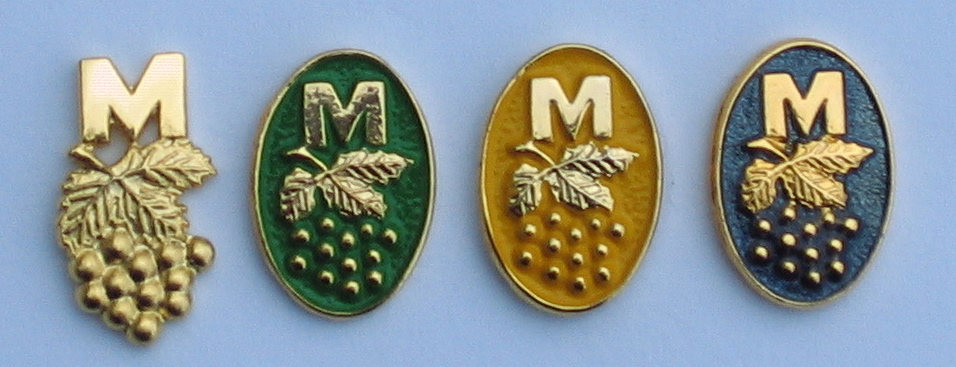
Pins for members of Munskänkarna. Far left a plain member pin with the logo of Munskänkarna, to the right pins for members which have passed the tests for some of the different course levels: 1-betyg ("grade 1") - green, druvbetyg ("grape grade") - yellow, 2-betyg ("grade 3") - blue.

Munskänkarna is a Swedish and Finnish wine tasting organization with over 20,000 members. The Swedish word "Munskänk" (corresponding to Mundschenk in German) is synonymous with "cup-bearer". It is used to refer to a single member, with the organisation's name "Munskänkarna" being the plural definite form. The organisation was established in Stockholm in 1958 and has continuously expanded with chapters in other locations, some outside of Sweden. In 2000, the chapters in Finland had become numerous enough to split off to form their own Finnish language organisation, Suomen Munskänkarna. In 2002, a Swedish language organisation in Finland called Svenska Munskänkarna i Finland was also formed. All three organisations are established as non-profit organisations.

As of 2006, the Swedish branch of Munskänkarna had over 19,000 members in 137 chapters, of which 129 in Sweden and 8 in other countries. In Finland there were 13 chapters in the Finnish-speaking organisation and 9 chapters in the Swedish-speaking organisation. Munskänkarna claims to be the world's largest wine tasting organisation.

Activities of Munskänkarna primarily include wine tastings and wine-related courses. The courses are organised much in the same way as those of the Wine & Spirit Education Trust: there are several different levels of progressing difficulty, and both a theoretical and a practical (i.e., blind tasting of wine) test at each level, plus a thesis at the highest level. Munskänkarna in Sweden publishes a magazine (Munskänken) where, among other things, most new wines appearing in the Swedish monopoly wine stores (Systembolaget) are reviewed.
