= Gothenburg Public House System =

System of alcohol regulation

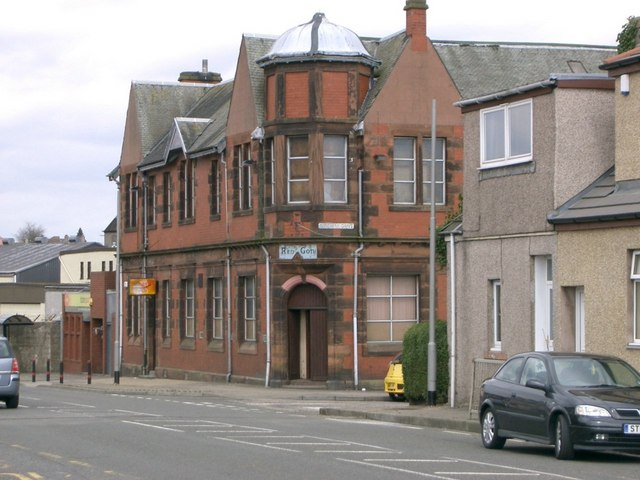
The Red Goth, Lochore

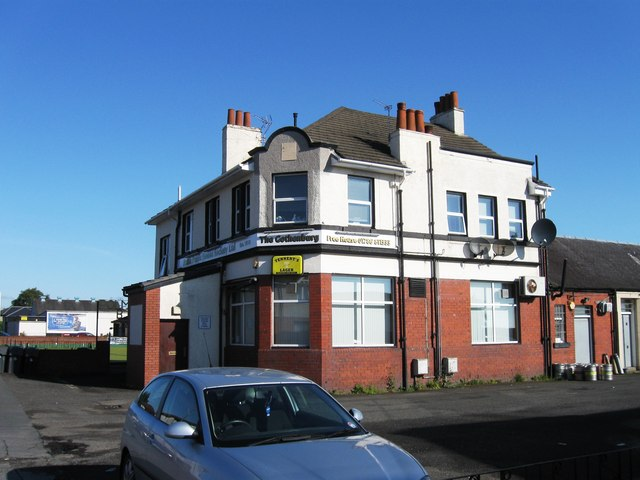
The Gothenburg, Fallin

The Gothenburg or Trust Public House system originated in the 1860s in Gothenburg, Sweden, in an attempt to control the consumption of spirits. Earlier in the century, 34 litres annual per capita consumption of spirits was recorded in Sweden. In 1855 the country proscribed domestic distillation. The city of Gothenburg awarded its sole retail licence for spirits to a trust, with the aim of controlling consumption. The shareholders of the trust were to receive a maximum return of 5% annually and all other profits were to be used to benefit the local community. The town treasury was to control the income generated and use it to provide libraries, museums, parks and other community facilities. The success of the system led to its spread throughout Sweden and further afield.

== In Scotland ==
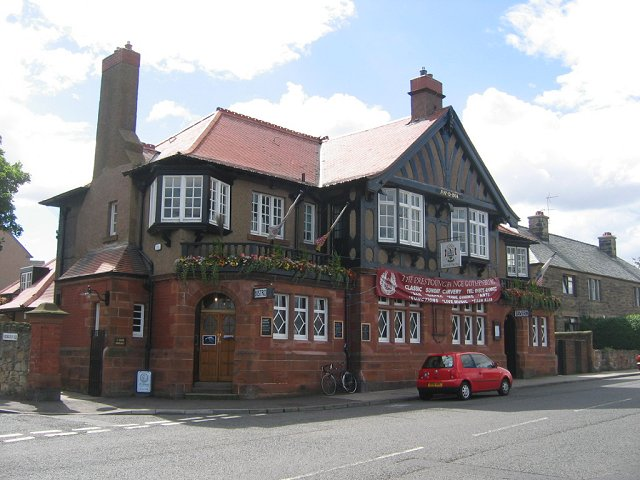
Prestoungrange Gothenburg, Prestonpans

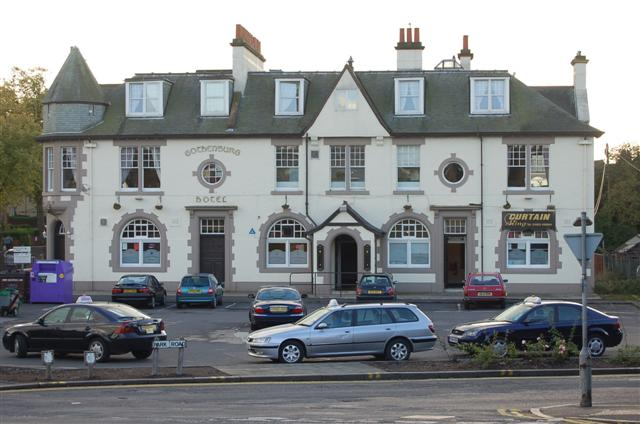
The Goth, Rosyth

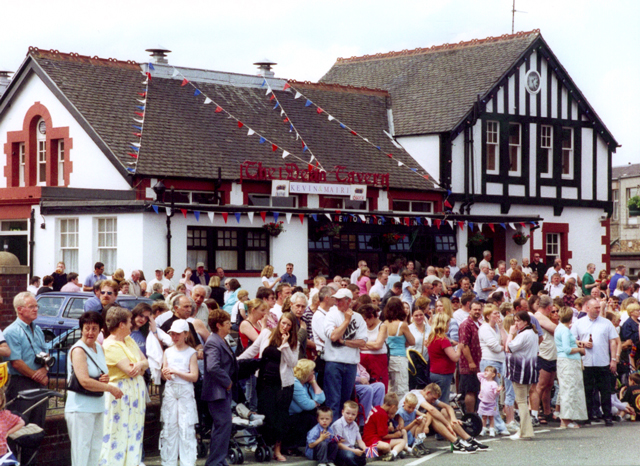
The Dean Tavern, Newtongrange

In Scotland, pubs run under the Gothenburg system are often colloquially known as "Goths".

Although controversial within the movement, some Scottish temperance campaigners advocated the system. The passing of the Industrial and Provident Societies Act 1893 (56 & 57 Vict. c. 39) allowed its adoption, and it took hold, particularly in coal mining communities, where mining companies had previously opposed the granting of pub licences. There were several 'Goths' in the Lothians, one each in Stirlingshire and Ayrshire and, until 1914, more than twenty in Fife, where the system took its strongest hold; strong links between Fife and Sweden had been established in the late nineteenth and early twentieth century due to the supply of coal to Swedish Railways by the Fife Coal Company. The local coal companies were often a source of funds to establish these pubs and were usually a dominant force on the boards of the trusts, with the miners themselves usually holding representation and sometimes contributing in part to the capital.

A premise of these pubs was that they were not to be attractive or welcoming, to discourage drinking, and the sale of spirits was not to be encouraged. No credit was given and betting and gambling were banned, as were any form of game or amusement (even dominoes).

Examples of facilities and beneficiaries funded by the system included libraries, museums, parks, bowling and cricket grounds and pavilions, cinemas, community centres or 'Gothenburg halls' and grants to galas, charities, clubs and societies and for the funding of district nurses and ambulances.

Today, some of these establishments remain as pubs but only the Dean Tavern in Newtongrange, the Goth in Armadale, the Prestoungrange Gothenburg in Prestonpans, and The Gothenburg in Fallin, Stirling, are still run under the Gothenburg system.

The Goth in Armadale was built in 1901 and extensively remodelled in 1924; it serves as a landmark on the Main Street of the town and consists of a stone frontage with an Art Nouveau public clock tower.

== In England ==
Joseph Chamberlain took an interest in the Gothenburg system and proposed a version of it to a Parliamentary Select Committee on Intemperance in 1877. This did not gain momentum but the issue was raised again in the 1890s by the Bishop of Chester, Francis Jayne, who wrote letters to The Times and published articles on the subject. He also founded the People's Refreshment House Association Limited. His ideas were not approved of by the Church of England Temperance Society who were hostile to the idea of "working men" having improved pubs and encouraged them to make home and family the focus of their leisure time. As well as Jayne's association, which had 130 establishments, there was a similar "Gothenburg-inspired" group called the Central Public House Trust Association, which owned about 250 "trust houses" in England and Wales by 1914.

== Cultural references ==
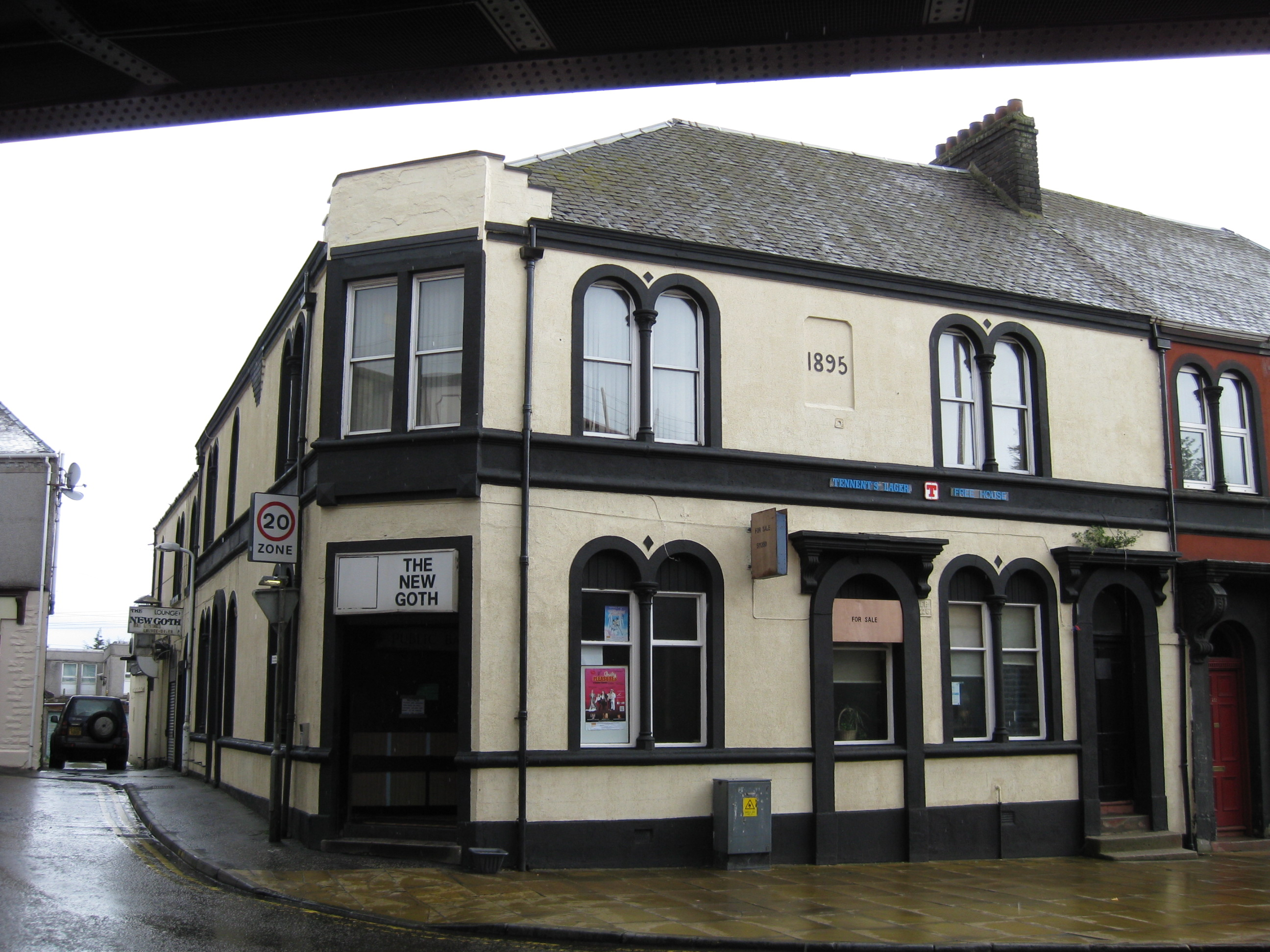
The New Goth, Cowdenbeath

The Number One Goth in Cardenden was referenced by Ian Rankin as the first pub in which his character John Rebus bought a round of drinks. Parts of Irvine Welsh's novella Kingdom of Fife are set in the New Goth in Cowdenbeath. The pub in the fictional village of Newton of Wemyss in A Darker Domain by Val McDermid was formerly a Goth.

== See also ==
- Alcohol monopoly
- List of public house topics
- Systembolaget
