= Alcoholic drinks in Sweden =

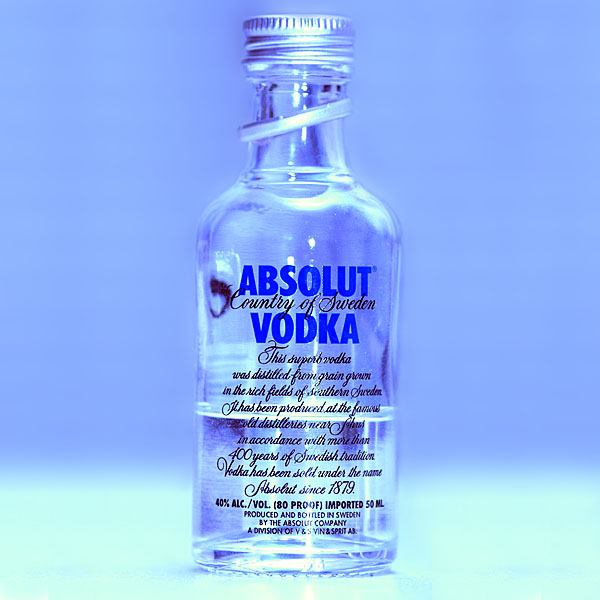
Absolut Vodka, the most successful product of the privatised manufacturer Vin&Sprit.

Alcoholic drinks in Sweden are as common as in most of the Western world. Sweden is historically part of the vodka belt, with high consumption of distilled drinks and binge drinking, but during the later half of the 20th century, habits became more harmonized with western Europe, with increasing popularity of wine and weekday drinking. Wine is now also grown and produced in several parts of Sweden and the southernmost region of Skåne is turning into a hub experiencing a strong growth in number of vineyards.

== Drinks and brands ==
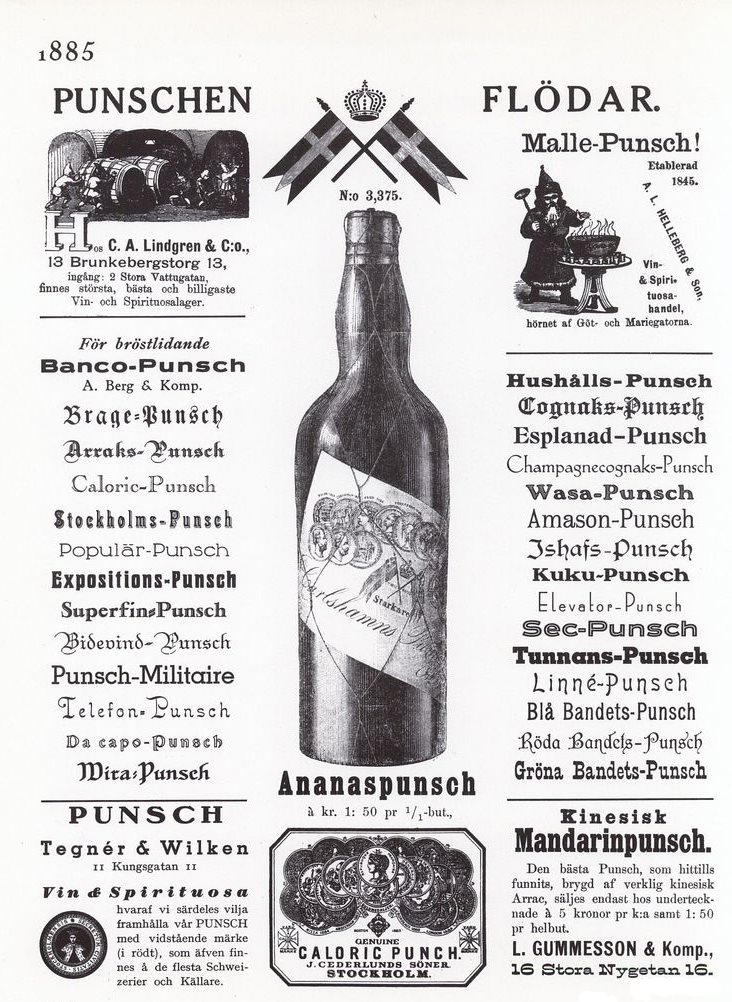
Caloric punsch advertisement circa 1885

The main Swedish specialty is brännvin (literally "burn-wine"), liquor distilled from fermented grain or potatoes. Vodka is the highest grade of brännvin, with brands like Absolut Vodka and Explorer Vodka. Brännvin seasoned with herbs is known as akvavit. This is usually drunk as a snaps, also known as nubbe, a small shot glass of alcohol served to accompany a traditional meal (especially pickled herring or crayfish). Swedish punsch is also a spirit of particular historical significance in Sweden.

Lager beer is the most popular beer, both with meals and in bars. In restaurants and bars it is usually served as "en stor stark" (literally "a large strong"), a glass usually containing 40–50 cL of starköl (see below). Lättöl (generally around 2% abv) is very popular in lunch restaurants as for the vast majority of people it is possible to drink one serving of it and still stay below the legal limits for drink driving.

Sweet cider is also common. As of July 1, 2005, new rules established that only fermented juice from apple or pear is allowed to be called cider. Before this change, any fruit-based drink could be called cider, meaning that what would be considered alcopop in other countries could be sold as cider in Sweden.

== History ==
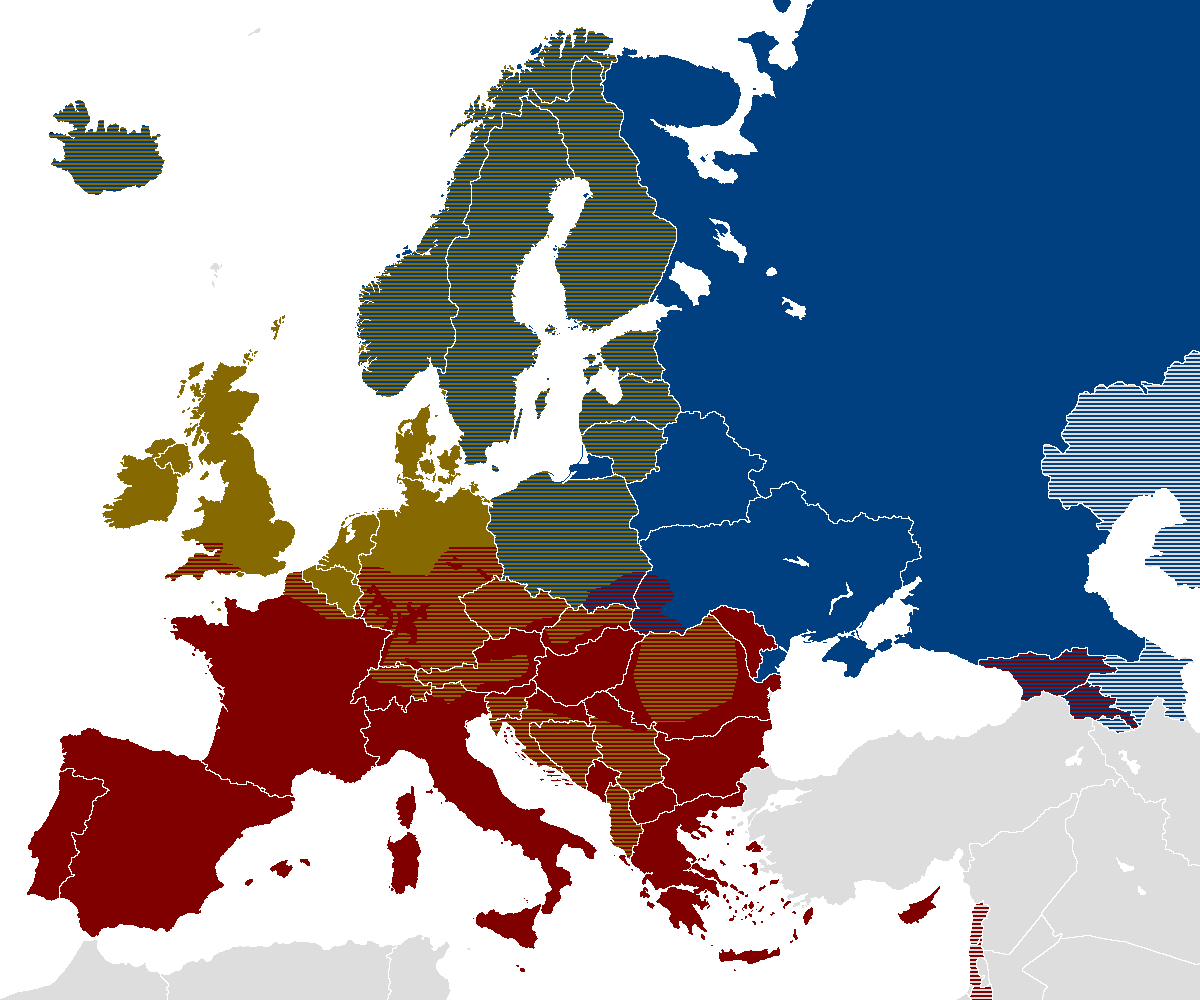
Sweden is traditionally part of the vodka belt.

Since the Middle Ages, beer was the staple drink in Sweden. Mead was a common delicacy. Distilling was introduced in the 15th century. Prohibition against production and/or sale of brännvin—distilled alcohol—has been enforced during some periods.

As Sweden was industrialized and urbanized during the 19th century, industrially produced brännvin became more available, and alcohol caused increasing health and social problems. The temperance movement rose, and since 1905, government has had a monopoly on sales of liquor. The Swedish prohibition referendum in 1922 resulted in continued sales of alcohol. A rationing system, called Brattsystemet or motbok, was used until 1955. As Sweden entered the EU in 1995, drinking habits became more continental, and regulations were relaxed. Systembolaget introduced box wine and law allowed private enterprises to produce, import and market alcohol, and sell directly to restaurants—though the retail monopoly remained. Consumption of alcohol increased by 30% from 1995 to 2005.

== Regulation and taxation ==
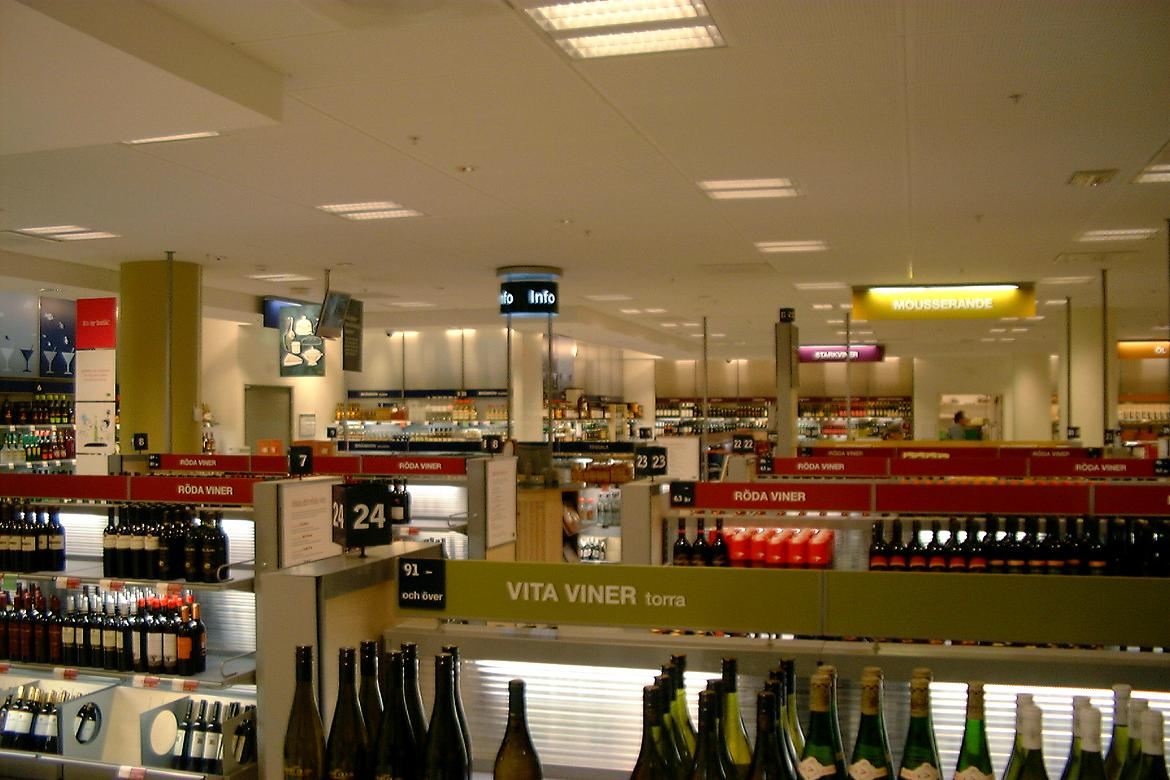
Systembolaget store.

Sweden has a government alcohol monopoly called Systembolaget for sale of all alcoholic drinks stronger than 3.5% by volume. The minimum purchase age at Systembolaget is 20 years, but 18 at licensed restaurants and bars.

Beer is legally divided into three classes. Class I (maximum 2.25%), called lättöl ("light beer"), is sold without restrictions (although shops often set their own age restrictions). Class II (up to 3.5%), called folköl ("people's beer"), is sold in regular stores, but with the minimum purchase age of 18. Class III, starköl ("strong beer", over 3.5%) is sold only in Systembolaget stores.

Drinks are taxed by content of alcohol, more heavily than in most other countries. As of 2007, the tax on vodka (40%) is 200.56 SEK/liter, on wine (14%) at 22.08 SEK/liter, and on beer (4.5%) 6.615 SEK/liter. Beer with 2.8% alcohol or less is exempt from tax, except VAT. The VAT is 12% (food tax) for drinks sold in shops having up to 3.5% alcohol, and 25% above that, and at restaurants.

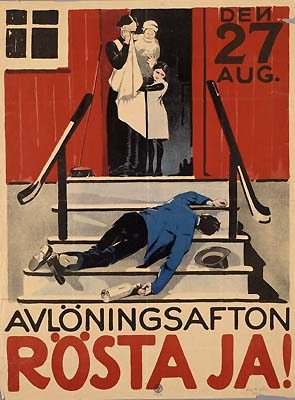
"Payday evening - vote yes!" Poster from 1922 Swedish prohibition referendum.

Systembolaget has a strict monopoly status on alcohol sales to consumers in Sweden, except for restaurant and bars, where alcohol can be sold for immediate consumption (bottles must be opened and cannot be brought home).

Other companies (producers and importers) can sell directly to restaurant and bars, an EU-enforced rule. Producers of alcohol, such as vineyards, however, are not allowed to sell bottles of their products directly to consumers. Small producers have an advantage by being allowed to sell directly to restaurants and due to the fact that Systembolaget shops can buy locally produced beverages for resale. Before these rules were introduced, it was very hard for a local producer to sell anything since the Systembolaget head office then decided on what would be sold, and preferred products that were expected to sell well nationwide because they did not want too many products.

The only exceptions to the monopoly to consumers are export shops at airports, which can sell alcohol to people checked in for a flight outside the EU. Alcohol cannot be sold on boats on Swedish waters, except for restaurants and bars, but the shop is opened at the border to international or foreign waters.

The import quota from other EU countries does not apply to personal use (unlimited). Due to the taxes many Swedes stock up in Denmark, Estonia or Germany. Limited rations of duty-free shopping is allowed on the ferries between Sweden and Finland, provided they dock at Åland, which is an autonomous part of Finland, and has a special treaty with the EU. Ordering alcohol for mail order delivery is permitted, but the Swedish state is able to levy taxes on the recipient of such alcohol.

Moonshining sometimes occurs, mainly in rural areas. Distilling without a commercial production license is illegal in Sweden, even for personal use, and might result in fines or jail time. The mere act of owning parts of a still is also illegal. It is however legal to make alcoholic drinks in a household for one's own personal use (i.e. homebrewing, and winemaking), as long as no distillation is involved.

== Restaurants and bars ==
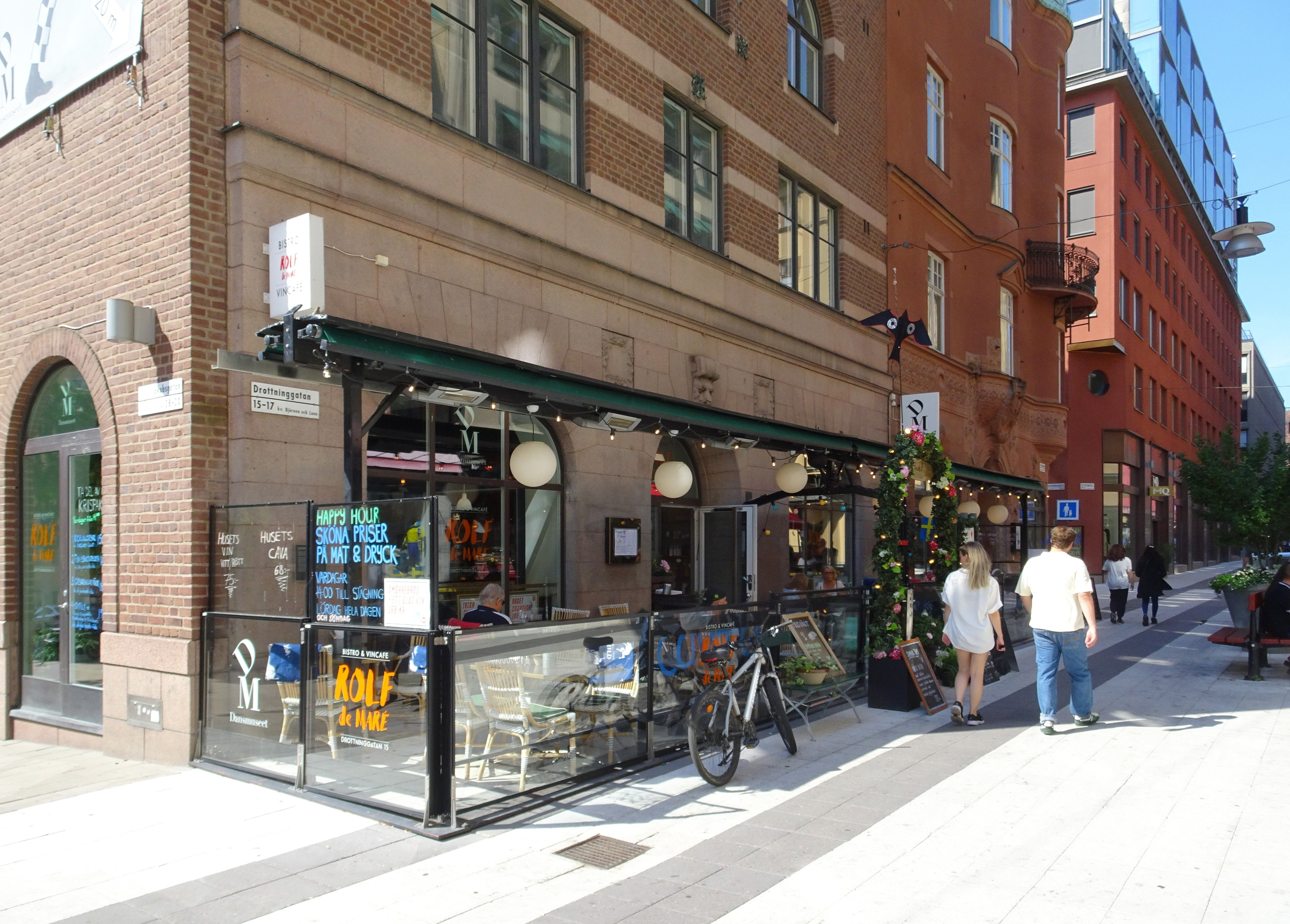
Restaurant outdoor areas have to be separated from the street to get alcohol permit (a simple fence is enough).

Alcohol can be sold in restaurants, bars and nightclubs. The age limit is 18, though some nightclubs voluntarily require a minimum age at the door above 18 (usually 20 or 23, occasionally up to 27; 30 has occurred). Alcohol may be served only between 11 a.m. – 1 a.m. Municipalities can permit a later closure time, sometimes as late as 5 a.m.

Alcohol is only allowed to be sold at bars if they are defined as restaurants, which means they have to offer warm food on location. After 11:00 p.m. a simple menu is enough. Restaurants, bars and pubs need permission from the municipality to sell alcohol. Overly drunk people must not be allowed to enter premises with an alcohol license. People who become noticeably intoxicated while at the premises must not be served more and in more serious cases have to be removed immediately.
The alcohol must be for immediate consumption, meaning that the staff has to open bottles. Guests are not allowed to bring alcoholic drinks into the restaurant or out from it, including if there is an adjacent convenience store, which has been a problem especially in hotel lobbies. In trains, people are not allowed to drink their own alcohol, but approved sales may take place. Outdoor areas in restaurants must be clearly separated from the street.
Restaurants must claim payment for every single glass and bottle sold. The inclusion of a first drink in the admission fee is prohibited. It is legal to sell large bottles of hard alcohol to groups, but not after 1:00 a.m.

From the 19th century to 1977 restaurants had to serve warm food when alcohol was sold. Many people bought simple food which they did not eat. It could be as simple as a boiled egg. Regulars who were known not to eat the food were often served food which had already been served to other customers.

=== Hotels ===
Hotels can sell alcohol if it has a restaurant permission. This includes the right to have a minibar or sell by room service, if all guests in that room are at least 18. This is not valid if the restaurant has a different operator than the hotel. In any case guests are allowed to bring and consume their own alcohol in the hotel room.

== Temperance movement ==
The temperance movement has been strong in Sweden, especially in agricultural areas, and often connected with free churches (non-conformists, that is, Protestants outside the Church of Sweden). The Straight Edge movement spread among Swedish youth in the 1990s.

Scandinavian Lutherans played a large part in supporting Prohibition in the United States.

The political attitude towards alcohol in Sweden has become more relaxed over the years.

== See also ==
- Museum of Spirits
- Swedish cuisine
- Swedish festivities
- Glögg
