= Steven Salzman =

American artist

- Born: New York City, American
- Occupation: Artist

Steven Salzman is an American artist who lives in New York City. He is notable for having been commissioned by Absolut Vodka to contribute to an advertising campaign for the company named Absolut Salzman. Materials from this campaign are in the permanent collection at Sweden's Spiritmuseum. He works primarily in geometric shapes, but Artnet Magazine uses the term "presentational" rather than abstract in describing a group exhibition that included his work.

== Life ==
Salzman grew up in New York City. His art studies began at the Art Students League of New York, then Bard College (from where he graduated), Hunter College, and, finally the Whitney Museum Independent Study Program.

== Work ==
Salzman's work has been exhibited at galleries including Hunter College Graduate Center Gallery, William Turner Gallery, Luis De Jesus Los Angeles, Hallwalls, White Columns, and the Nassau County Museum of Art.
