= The Gothenburg, Fallin =

Gothenburg pub in Fallin, Stirling, Scotland

The Gothenburg
- Fallin Public House Society Limited
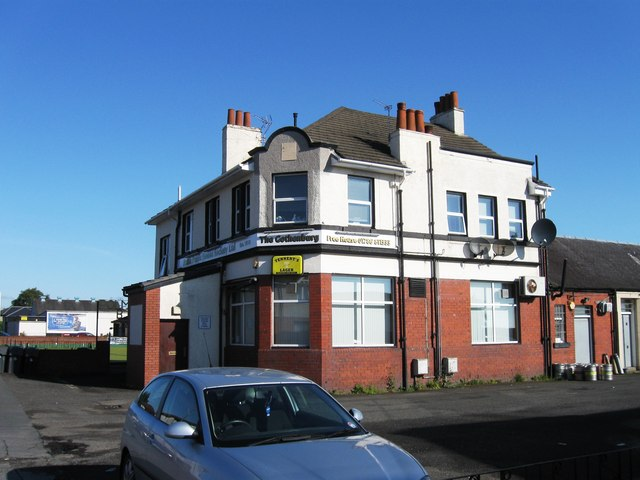
- The Goth in 2014
- Named after: The Gothenburg system
- Founded: Opened 4 November 1910
- Type: Registered Society (395RS)
- Headquarters: Fallin, Stirling, Scotland
- Coordinates: 56.10168°N 3.86529°W
- Services: Public house, function rooms
- Members: 365 (2017)
- Revenue: 160,389 (2017)

The Gothenburg, or simply The Goth, is a community-run pub in the former mining village of Fallin, near Stirling, Scotland.

Founded in 1910, it is one of the few remaining pubs in Scotland still run under the Gothenburg system, with at least 95% of the profits donated to community causes. During miners' strikes, The Goth hosted soup kitchens and supported miners' strike funds. It remains as a marker of the village's mining history.

The Goth has close ties with the neighbouring bowls club.
