= 1994 Swedish European Union membership referendum =

- 13 November 1994
- Do you think that Sweden should become a member of the EU in accordance with the agreement between Sweden and the EU member states?

Results
Choice	Votes	%
Yes	2,833,721	52.74%
No	2,539,132	47.26%
Valid votes	5,372,853	99.05%
Invalid or blank votes	51,634	0.95%
Total votes	5,424,487	100.00%
Registered voters/turnout	6,510,055	83.32%
Results by county
Yes
50%-60%
60%-70%
No
50%-60%
60%-70%
70%-80%

A non-binding referendum on membership for the European Union was held in Sweden on 13 November 1994. 53% of voters voted in favour, with a turnout of 83%. Later Sweden joined EU in January 1, 1995.

== Campaign ==
The Social Democrats, Centre Party, the Christian Democrats, Moderates and the Liberal People's Party officially supported European Union membership, while the Left Party and the Green Party were opposed.

== Result ==
Choice	Votes	%
For	2,833,721	52.74
Against	2,539,132	47.26
Total	5,372,853	100.00
Valid votes	5,372,853	99.05
Invalid votes	2,697	0.05
Blank votes	48,937	0.90
Total votes	5,424,487	100.00
Registered voters/turnout	6,510,055	83.32
Source: Nationalencyklopedin

== By county ==
Region	Yes	% Yes	No	% No	Electorate	Votes	Valid	Invalid votes
Stockholm	623,496	62.03	381,635	37.97	1,216,980	1,014,869	1,005,131	9,738
Uppsala	92,167	53.96	78,636	46.04	205,736	172,747	170,803	1,944
Södermanland	86,083	54.31	72,430	45.69	191,199	160,141	158,513	1,628
Östergötland	139,697	54.49	116,689	45.51	309,509	259,312	256,386	2,926
Örebro	81,423	47.47	90,109	52.53	208,184	173,286	171,532	1,754
Västmanland	87,058	54.81	71,778	45.19	193,184	160,400	158,836	1,564
Jönköping	100,072	48.89	104,616	51.11	242,805	206,545	204,688	1,857
Kronoberg	58,015	51.87	53,824	48.13	134,559	113,019	111,839	1,180
Kalmar	73,207	48.74	76,987	51.26	184,802	151,649	150,194	1,455
Gotland	17,996	51.40	17,017	48.60	43,878	35,399	35,013	386
Blekinge	45,098	46.90	51,065	53.10	116,586	97,106	96,163	943
Skåne	422,567	63.23	245,696	36.77	818,810	674,619	668,263	6,356
Halland	97,222	58.44	69,150	41.56	197,757	168,244	166,372	1,872
Västra Götaland	466,591	51.99	430,924	48.01	1,085,238	906,508	897,515	8,993
Värmland	84,627	47.46	93,703	52.54	217,170	179,875	178,330	1,545
Dalarna	71,253	39.06	111,150	60.94	220,141	184,047	182,403	1,644
Gävleborg	74,767	41.69	104,583	58.31	222,780	180,980	179,350	1,630
Västernorrland	69,582	41.96	96,233	58.04	201,394	167,081	165,815	1,266
Jämtland	24,714	27.94	63,731	72.06	104,798	89,121	88,445	676
Västerbotten	60,071	37.23	101,285	62.77	193,374	162,532	161,356	1,176
Norrbotten	58,015	34.97	107,891	65.03	201,171	167,007	165,906	1,101
Source: European Election Database

== See also ==
- Referendums in Sweden
