= Fallin, Stirling =

Coordinates: 56.1037°N 3.8762°W

Fallin: Scottish Gaelic: tuitin; Scots: Fallin
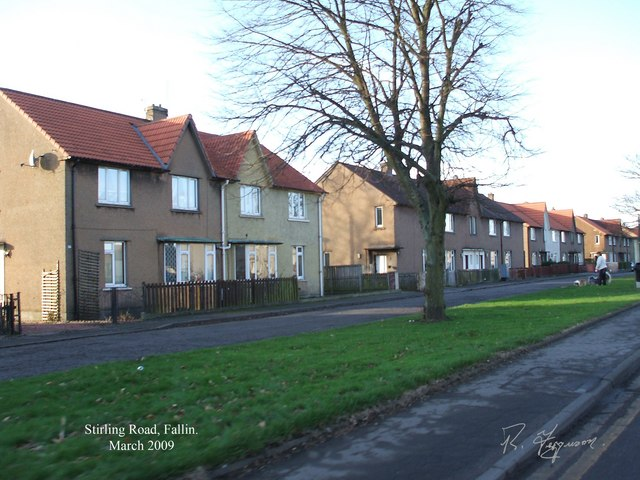
- Stirling Road (A905) the main route through Fallin, the former mining village. A westwards view towards Stirling.

- Location within the Stirling council area
- Population: 2,850 (2020)
- OS grid reference: NS833916
- Civil parish: St. Ninians
- Council area: Stirling
- Lieutenancy area: Stirling and Falkirk
- Country: Scotland
- Sovereign state: United Kingdom
- Post town: Stirling
- Postcode district: FK7
- Dialling code: 01786
- Police: Scotland
- Fire: Scottish
- Ambulance: Scottish
- UK Parliament: Stirling and Strathallan
- Scottish Parliament: Stirling

Fallin (/fəˈlɪn/) is a former pit village in Central Stirling, in the county of Stirlingshire. It was on the site of the Polmaise Colliery 3&4 (Polmaise Colliery 1&2 were situated in Milhall), and both of the names Polmaise and Fallin were commonly used. Fallin is regarded the last traditional pit village in Scotland. The area lies on the A905 road 3 miles east of Stirling on a bend in the River Forth. The 2001 United Kingdom census recorded the population as 2,710.

Fallin has been the site of several new housing developments and community initiatives.

== History ==
The village of Fallin originated in the early 1900s as a result of coal production at Polmaise colliery which began in 1905. The blocks, housing for miners and families, were built shortly after and provided housing for over 200 families. In June 1907, Fallin Primary School was completed and Alexander McLeod was headmaster of the school until 1926. The first cottages, known as the blocks, for miners and families were built in the 1930s. In 1938, electricity supply first became available to the village. Fallin expanded after the Second World War, and in 1946 a new housing development was announced which was completed in 1949 and known locally as "The Crescent". In the early 1950s, Stirling Council announced plans to build 170 new houses in the village, where the pit blocks were. Stirling Council took over the running of Fallin pit blocks, from the National Coal Board, on 6 March 1954 but the last block was not demolished until 1957.

=== Polmaise Colliery ===
The Polmaise Colliery began producing coal in 1905 and the pit was owned by Archibald and Sons. The Colliery was the site of a number of mining strikes, and the first was in 1926 as part of the General Strike, and later in 1938 when the Polmaise miners went on their own strike for 10 months. The strike was about working conditions and a dispute between colliers on who wanted to work for the company directly and the contractors. In the 1980s, Polamise colliery underwent redevelopment meaning miners would get coal from Manor Powis colliery and Cowie, both were pits that had closed down by then, and many were transferred to other pits in the meantime. There were a number of pit closures in the 1980s, and in 1983 the nearby Cardowan colliery was due to closed and the Coal Board offered Cardowan miners to apply for transfers to other pits like Polmaise. There was a major dispute with the Coal Board because the local Polmaise miners (who had been transferred as a result of the redevelopment) had been assured first refusal on employment.

The Miners Strike of 1984-1985 began after the Coal Board decided to close the pit due to geological concerns in the pit and a decline in demand for Polmaise coal. An official strike was called at Polmaise on 21 February 1984 and eventually the strike expanded nationally across the UK on 9 March 1984. Polmaise colliery was finally closed on 17 July 1987, at which time 112 men were still employed there.

== Geography ==
Fallin is situated along the River Forth. The Wester Moss nature reserve in Fallin was given a Site of Special Scientific interest (SSSI) status because its peat bog holds ecological importance.

== Governance ==
Fallin lies in the Stirling and Strathallan constituency of the UK Parliament and the Stirling constituency of the Scottish Parliament.

For Local Government purposes, Fallin is of the Bannockburn Ward of Stirling Council.

=== Local government ===
Fallin is represented by Polmaise Community Council.

== Transport ==
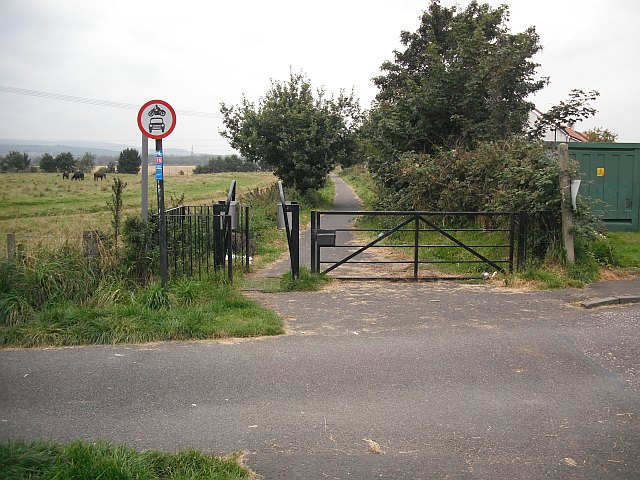
Fallin Cycle Path (2009)

The A905 passes through Fallin along Stirling Road. The nearest motorway to and from Fallin is the M9 which connects Stirling with Edinburgh and Glasgow, and the M876 which links to Falkirk and the Kincardine Bridge area. Bus services are limited within the village and Fallin's only bus service is provided by McGill's Midland Bluebird which operates the F16 bus running between Stirling Bus Station and Westquarter Valley. There are is no bus service available in Fallin on Sundays.

Fallin's cycle and footpath was improved and extended in 2022. A new cycle and footpath from Cowie to Fallin was completed as part of mitigation work for the Beauty-Denny substation development by ScottishPower Energy Networks.

== Education ==
Fallin Primary School serves the communities of both Fallin and Throsk. The original building was closed and the present building was opened in 1967. Fallin Nursery is located next to the primary school. Fallin is within the catchment area for Wallace High School, Causewayhead.

== See also ==
- The Gothenburg, Fallin
