= Bratt System =

Alcohol rationing method

The Bratt System was a system that was used in Sweden (1919–1955) and similarly in Finland (1944–1970) to control alcohol consumption, by rationing of liquor. Every citizen allowed to consume alcohol was given a booklet called a motbok (viinakortti in Finland), in which a stamp was added each time a purchase was made at Systembolaget (in Sweden) and Alko (in Finland). A somewhat similar system called tšekisüsteem also existed in Estonia between July 1, 1920 and December 31, 1925 (the difference being that unlike in Sweden and Finland, there never was any centralised alcohol monopoly retailer or producer; the sale of alcoholic beverages in said country was mainly delegated to the country's municipalities). The stamps were based on the amount of alcohol bought. When a certain amount of alcohol had been bought, the owner of the booklet had to wait until next month to buy more.

The rations were gradually changed, but were issued in greater quantities to men (due to the lesser effects incurred on a male of equal or lesser weight) and citizens of titles and professions associated with a higher social standing. Citizens made frequent use of friends' or even strangers' booklets, for example by rewarding a young woman with a dinner out in return for the other party consuming most or all of the alcohol incurring the stamps. Wine was exempt from rationing, as it was then believed to be less dangerous, with little or no correlation to alcohol-related abuse or violence.

Named after medical doctor and liberal politician Ivan Bratt, the Bratt system, involving the motbok/viinakortti, was made permanent in 1922 after a referendum on a total ban on alcohol had been held. In said referendum, a narrow 51% had voted no to banning alcohol sales. Its primary purpose was to decrease the consumption of alcohol. While a motbok owner could buy almost unlimited amounts of wine, spirits were highly restricted.

Swedish-speaking Finnish author Esther Hjelt-Cajanus discussed the Swedish Bratt System in her work Brattsystemet i Sverige (1931).

As of December 31, 1948, the average purchase amount allowed per motbok per month was 1.82 litres (approx. 3½ pints) of spirits.

== Gallery ==
The Bratt system

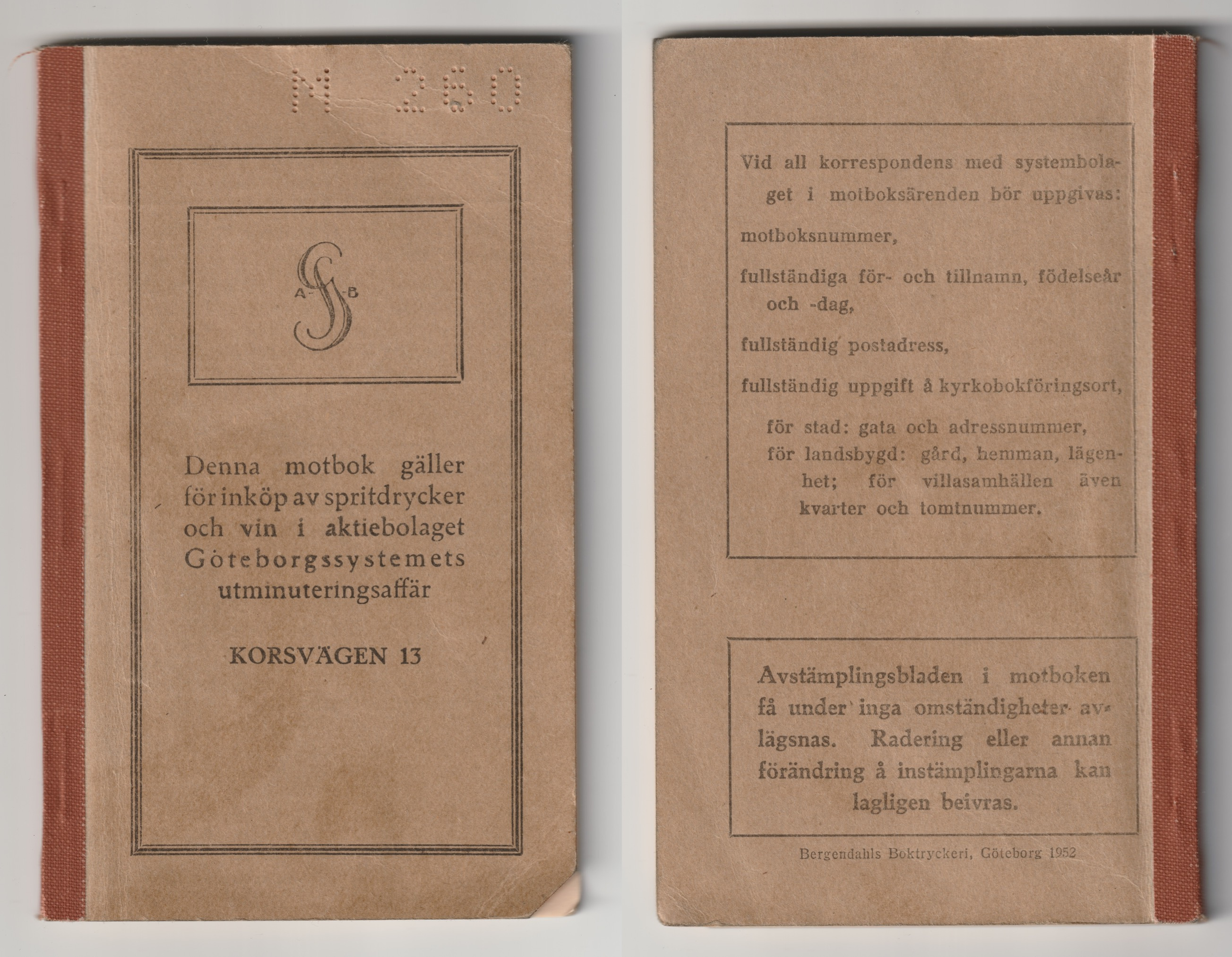
Motbok from Gothenburg, Sweden (1952).

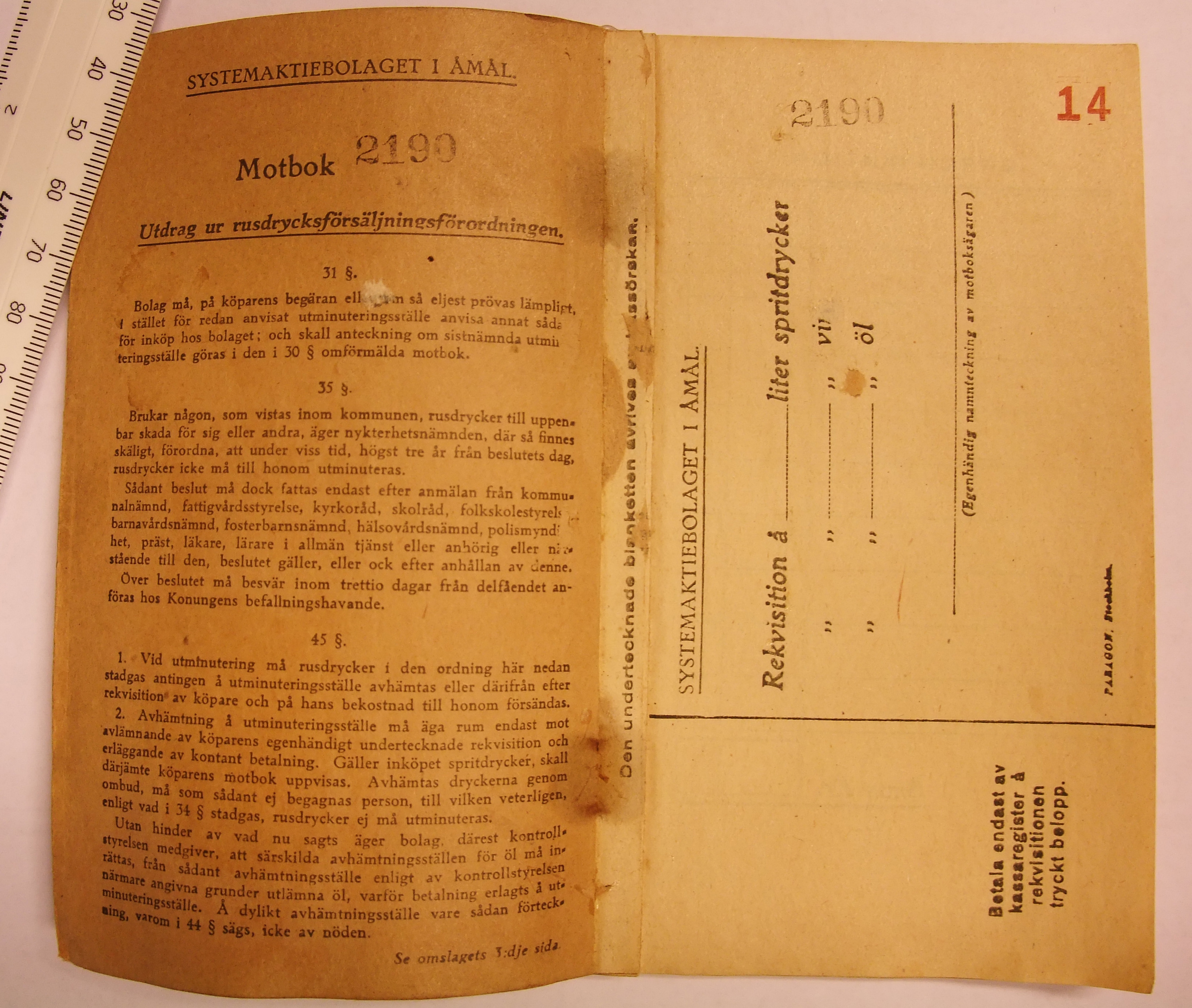
"Motbok" - Åmål systembolag (1920). Section 1

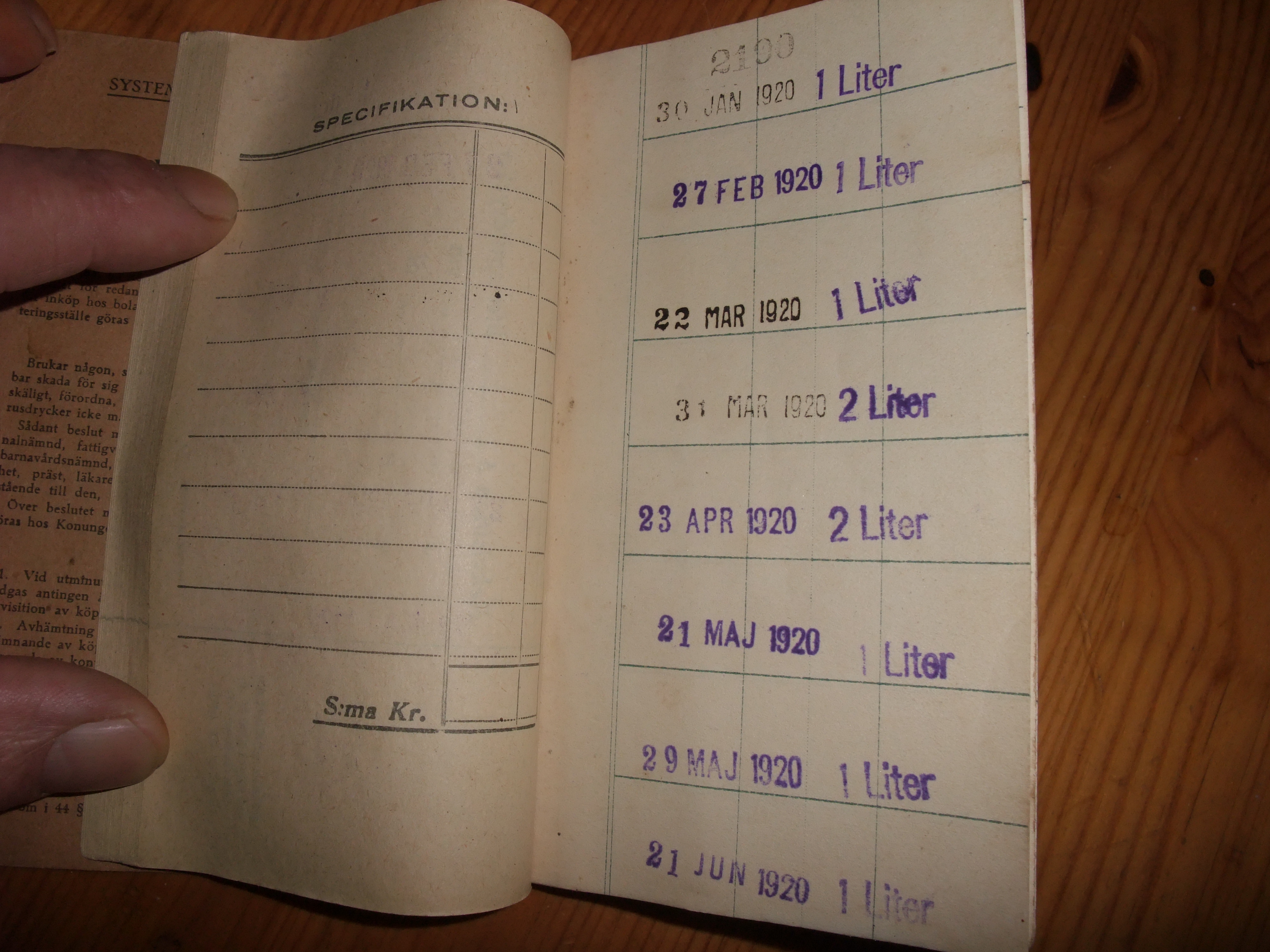
"Motbok" - Åmål systembolag (1920). Section 2

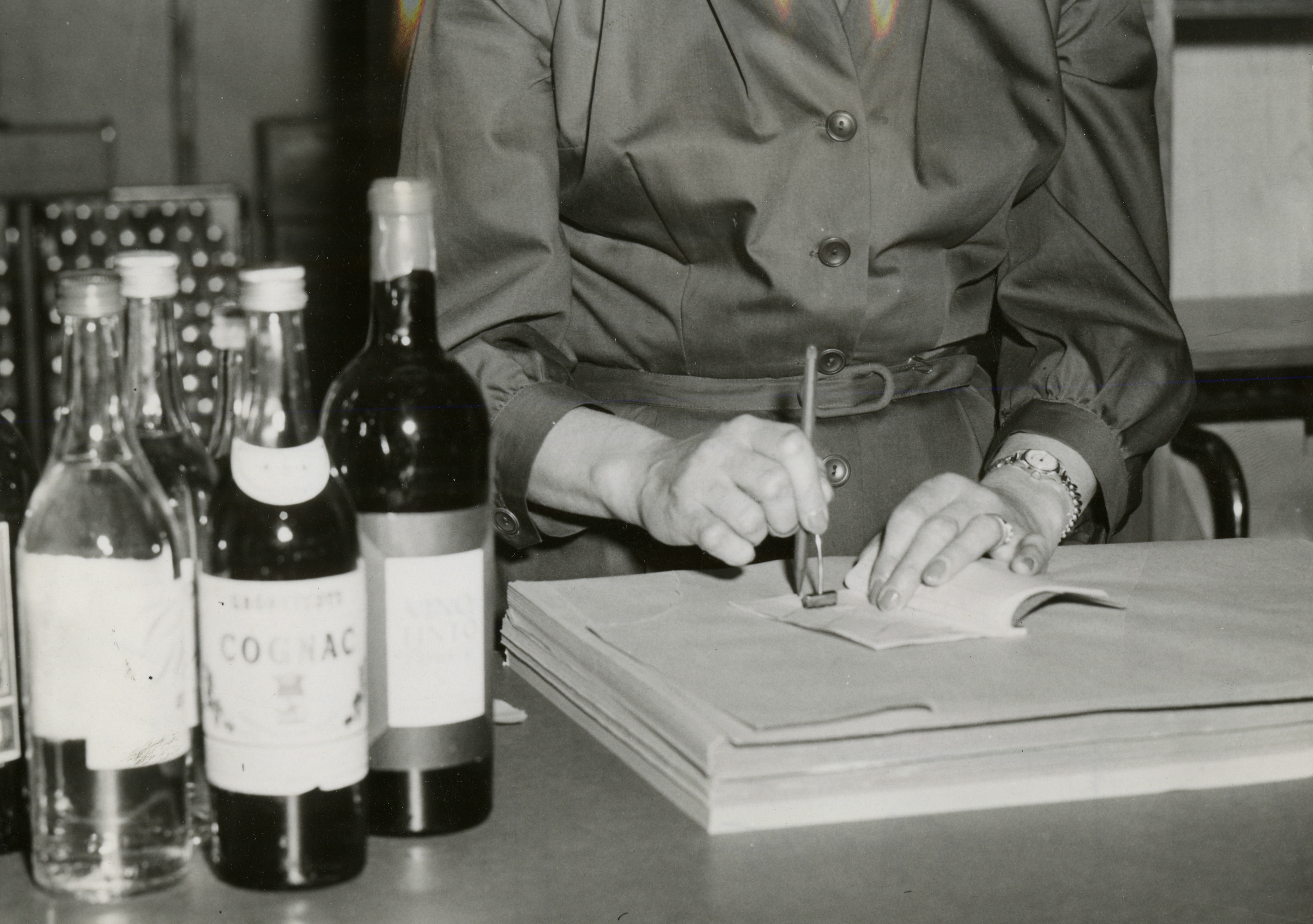
Stamping a "motbok" (with alcohol purchases shown on left) in 1955

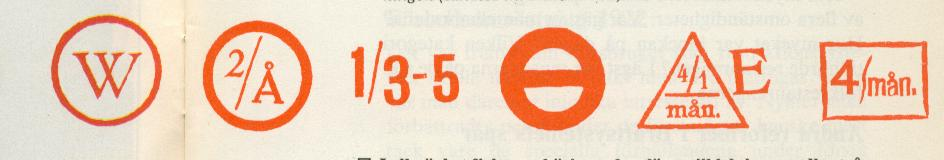
A collection of Systembolaget stamps in the "motbok" for permitted quotas (click on the image for full description)

== Sources ==
- Nationalencyklopedin, 2007

== See also ==
- 1922 Swedish prohibition referendum
- Alcoholic beverages in Sweden
