= Systembolaget =

State-owned Swedish liquor store company

Systembolaget AB

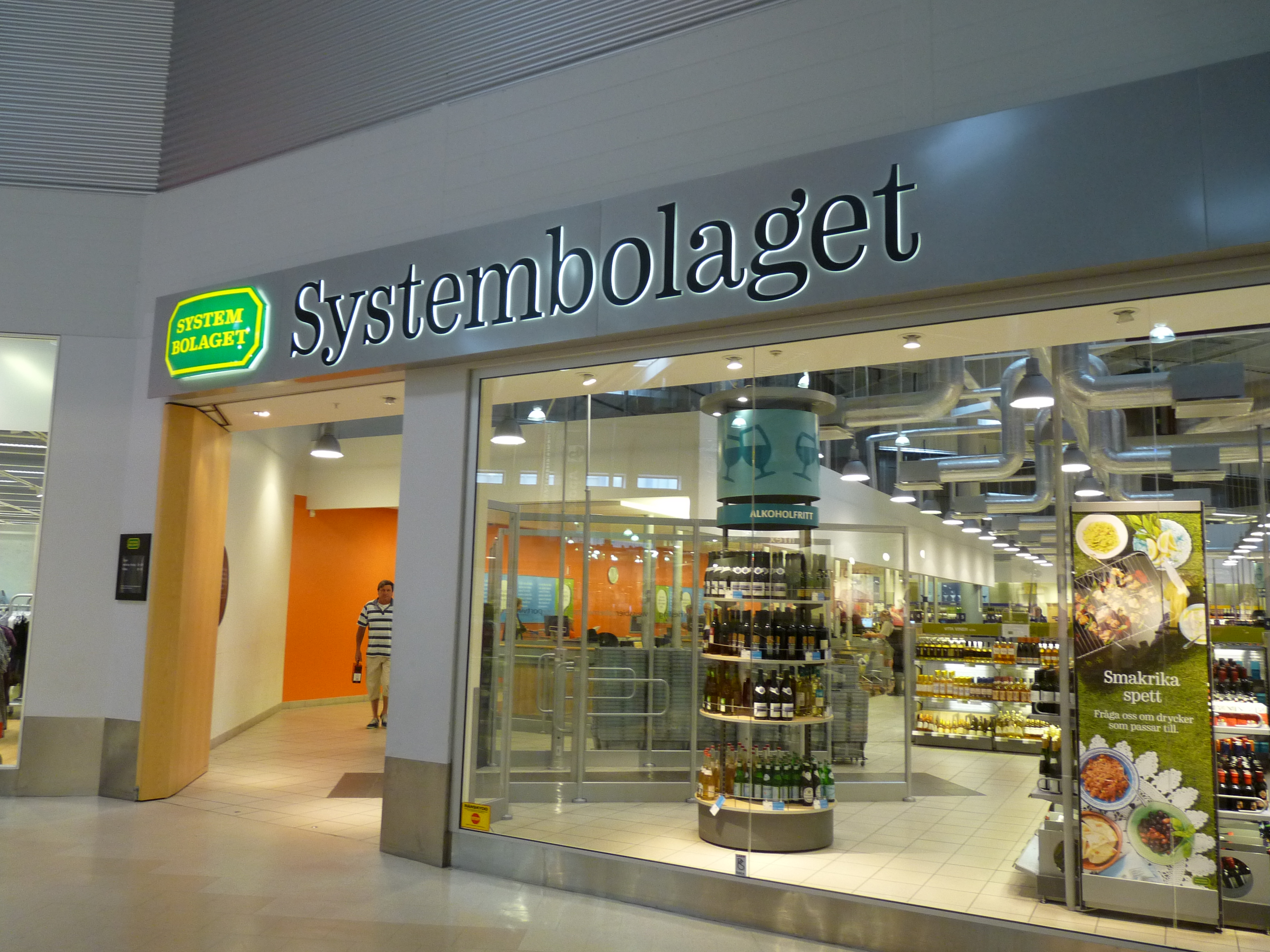
- Systembolaget store at Kungens Kurva in July 2009
- Type: Government enterprise
- Industry: Food and drink
- Founded: 1 October 1955 (71 years ago)
- Headquarters: Stockholm, Sweden
- Number of locations: 452 stores (2024)<https://www.omsystembolaget.se/foretagsfakta/systembolaget-i-siffror/
- Key people: Göran Hägglund, Board chairman Ann Carlsson, CEO
- Products: Alcoholic beverages
- Revenue: ▲39.4 billion SEK (2024)
- Operating income: ▲331 million SEK (2024)
- Number of employees: 6,040 (2024)
- Parent: Government Offices of Sweden
- Website: www.systembolaget.se

Systembolaget (Swedish: [sʏˈstêːmbʊˌlɑːɡɛt], "the System Company"), colloquially known as systemet ("the system") or bolaget ("the company"), is a government-owned chain of liquor stores and online retailer for alcoholic beverages in Sweden. It is the only retail store allowed to sell alcoholic beverages that contain more than 3.5% alcohol by volume.

Systembolaget acts as a portal for private companies selling alcohol on the Swedish market and as of 2023, it represents 1,200 vendors ranging from small local breweries to large scale importers and multinational companies, selling products from a total of over 5,000 producers from all over the world.

Systembolaget also sells non-alcoholic beverages, although this product segment represents less than one percent of the company's total sales of beverages.

The minimum age to buy alcohol at Systembolaget is 20 years. At Swedish restaurants and bars the legal age to buy alcoholic beverages is 18 years, though bars and clubs may voluntarily set an age limit higher than 18 if they prefer.

Systembolaget's stores must close no later than 20:00 on weekdays and 15:00 on Saturdays. The online store delivers on weekdays between 10.00–20.00 and on Saturdays between 9.00–15.00. On Sundays and public holidays all Systembolaget's stores are closed and no home deliveries are delivered. Systembolaget's stores and home deliveries are also closed on Christmas Eve and Midsummer Eve.

== Governing laws ==
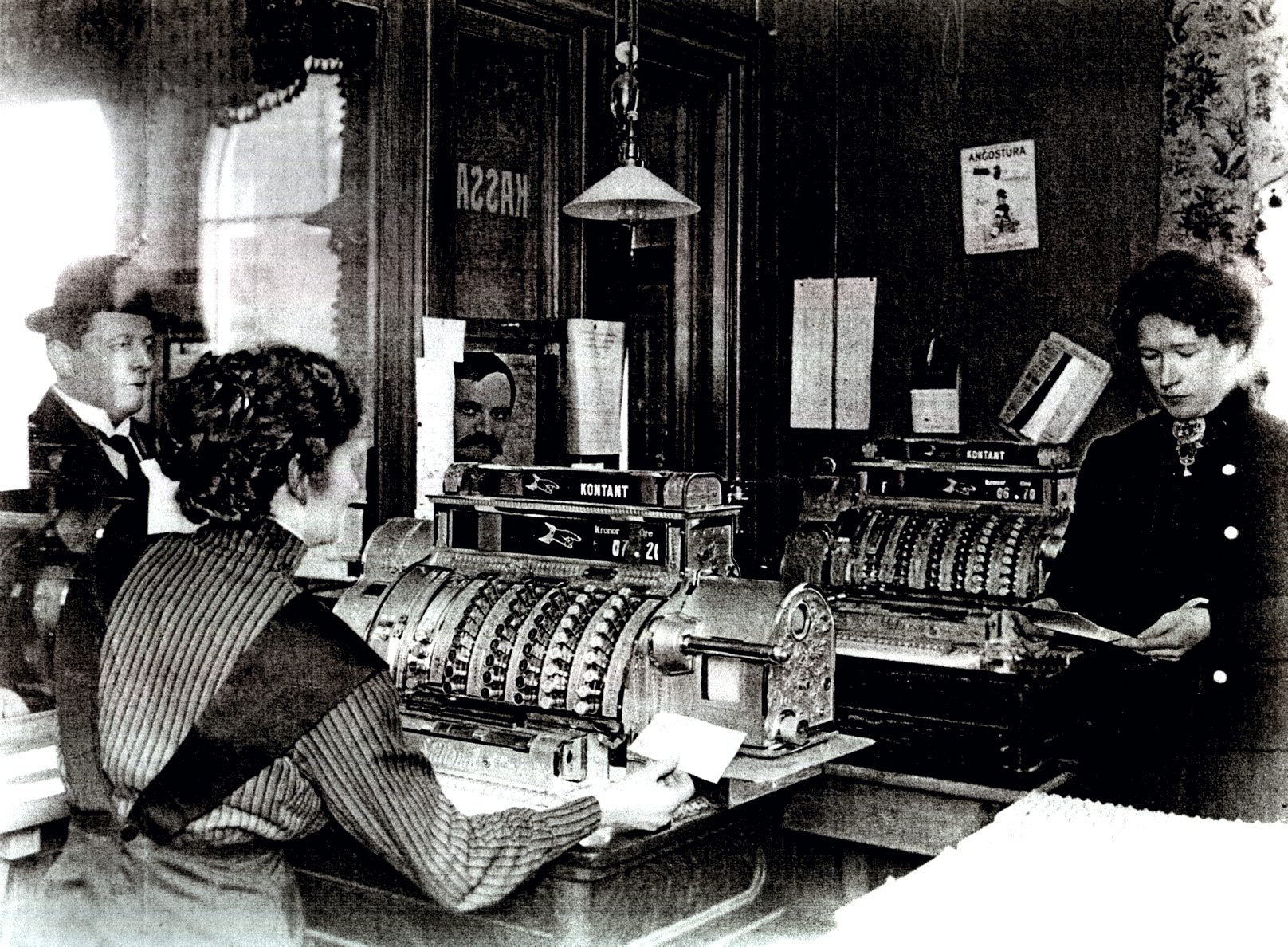
Interior of the cashering area of a Systembolaget store with counter service in Växjö, c. 1916

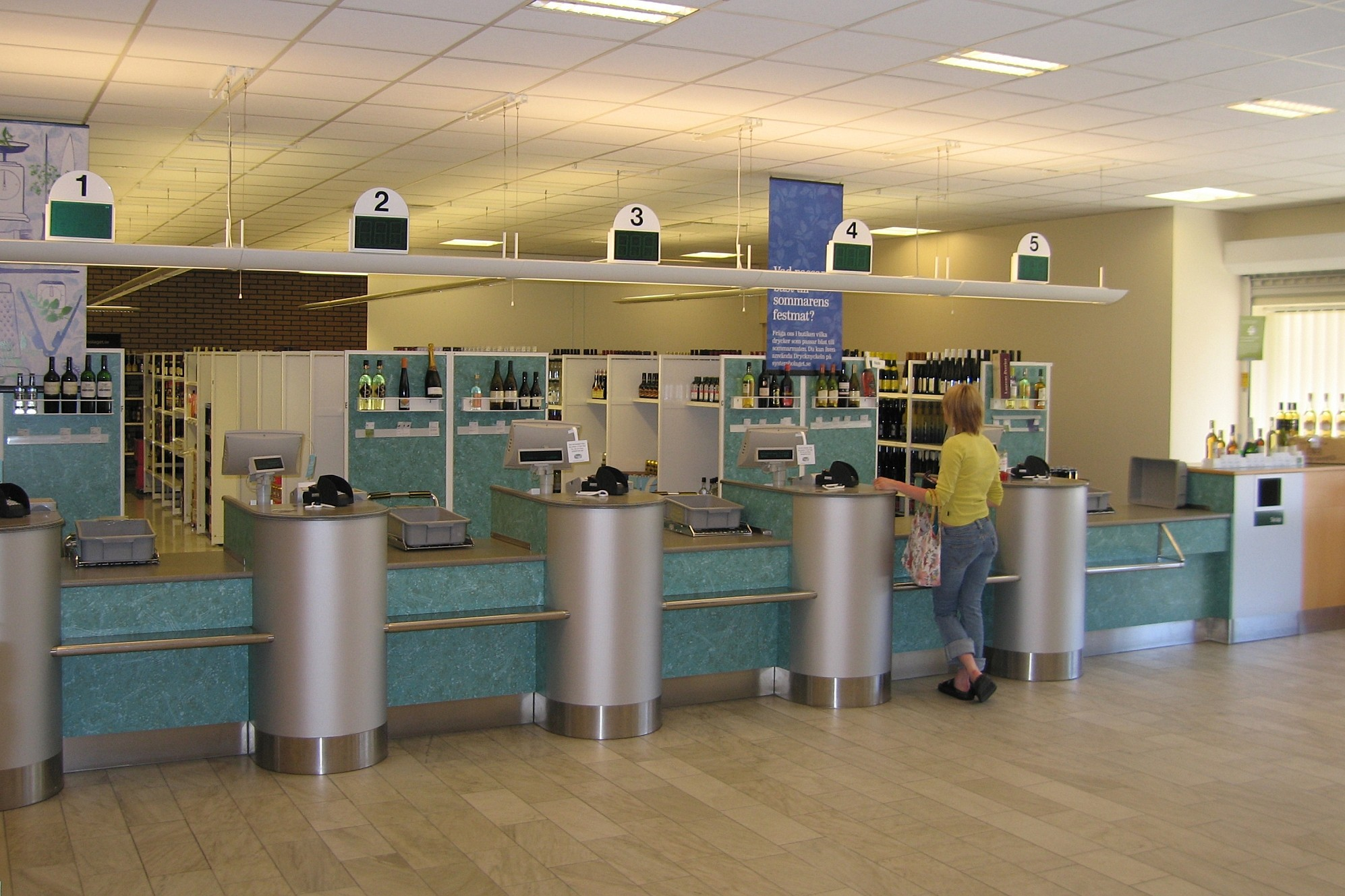
The traditional layout of a Systembolaget store, with counters where customers place their orders (June 2006). Today some stores use supermarket-style self-service.

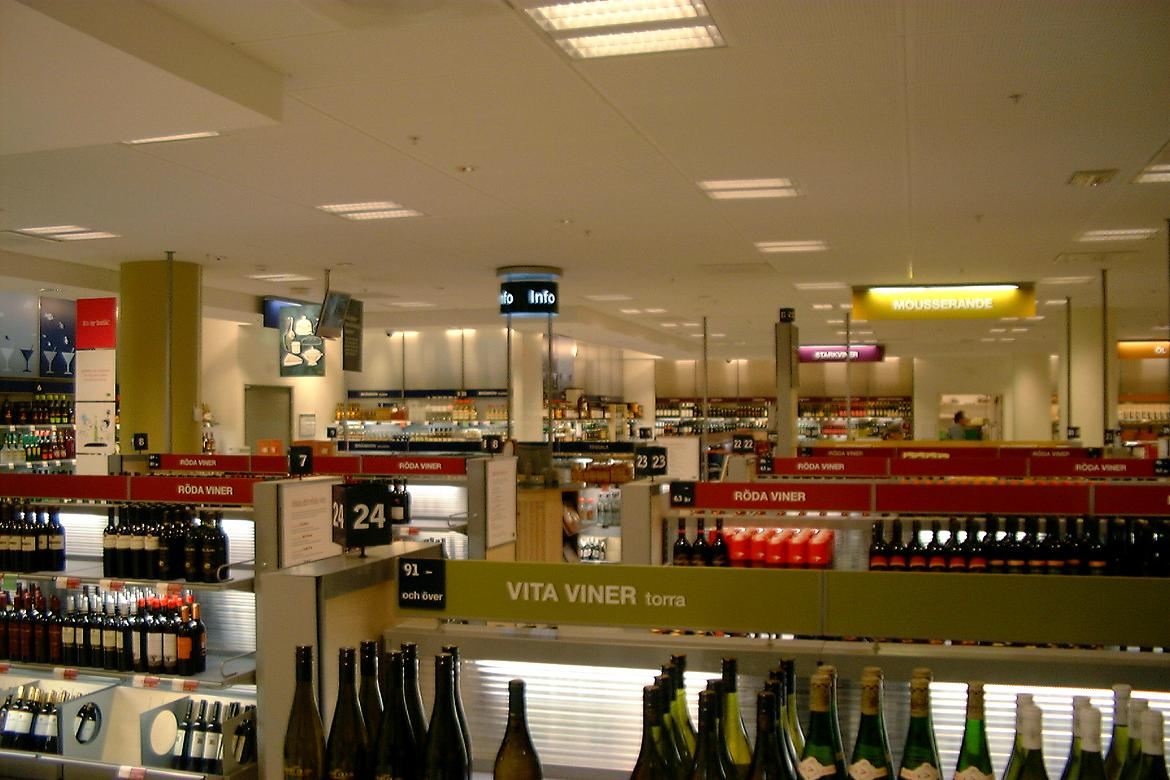
Self-service Systembolaget in Södertälje, Sweden. This is the normal layout of the Systembolaget stores since the 1990s.

There are several laws and rules governing how Systembolaget stores operate, such as:

- All products, including beer cans and bottles (except products that are not kept in stock and have to be pre-ordered), are sold individually. Pre-ordered products may sometimes only be sold in quantities corresponding with the minimum order accepted by the manufacturer. Some traditional Swedish shots are also sold in holiday packs.
- Discounts, such as "Buy 1, get 1 free" and "One can 20 kr, two cans 30 kr" type deals, are prohibited.
- No product may be favoured over another, which in practice means that the beers are not refrigerated, since otherwise all beer would have to be refrigerated which is too expensive.
- The minimum age to purchase beverages above 3.5% alcohol is 20 years of age. A main reason to have Systembolaget as a monopoly is to enforce this age limit. Several tests have shown that restaurants and food shops often sell 3.5% beer to people below the minimum legal age of 18.
- People who look under 25 have to show an identity document. This has to be certified identity cards or driving licenses from the Nordic countries, national identity card from an EU/EEA country or be a passport.
- Systembolaget is not allowed to sell alcoholic beverages to drunk people or to people that they have reason to believe are purchasing for someone under legal age.
- In villages too small for a profitable Systembolaget shop and too far away from a shop, Systembolaget contracts food shops to sell alcohol. Such alcohol must be sold on demand and not on shelves among other food or beverages.

Systembolaget has a strict monopoly status on alcohol sales to consumers in Sweden, with the following exceptions:

- Restaurant and bars can sell alcohol for consumption on site, which customers are not permitted to take away from the premises (bottles are opened by staff). In other countries, people are able to take a bottle of wine home if there is some left over at the end of their meal, but in Sweden it must be consumed or wasted.
- Private imports for a consumer's own consumption are allowed, based on EU regulations and court cases, both during private travel and by post. However, Sweden is able to levy taxes on recipients of alcohol sent by post.
- Other companies (producers and importers) can sell directly to restaurant and bars (EU enforced rule).
- Producers of alcohol, such as vineyards, are not allowed to sell their products directly to consumers, but have the right to sell them through the nearest Systembolaget shops if they are not large enough for nationwide sales. This was a point of debate in the 2022 election, and the new government has implemented a law that permits the selling of alcohol by producers of said alcohol directly to customers. The sale needs to be in connection with an informative event and there are restrictions on, among other things, the amount of alcohol that may be purchased.
- Export and duty-free shops at airports can sell alcohol to people checked in for a flight outside the EU. Alcohol cannot be sold in shops on boats on Swedish waters, but the shop is opened at the border to international or foreign waters.

As part of their accession to the European Union in 1995, Sweden and Finland are the only two EU member states granted an exception of free trade agreements allowing state-run alcohol monopolies.

== Taxation and pricing ==
As with other government-owned monopolies within free-trade areas, there are several aspects that govern the operation. All product selections and displays must be based on customer preferences, and every producer and distributor must be handled the same way. All marketing activities must be for the company itself and its own services, never for an individual product. This is also the reason why all products are taxed on alcohol content, not on price, and that all products are sold with the same profit margin. This explains why an off-brand vodka can be seen as very expensive when compared to a premium-brand spirit bottle of a similar size.

Beer is not so highly taxed anymore in order to protect Swedish breweries and their employment opportunities against purchase during travel abroad. It is (as of 2023) 2.12 SEK per % alcohol and liter, which means 5.3 SEK for a 5% beer can (50 cl). Such a can usually costs about 10 SEK (0.88 EUR) at Systembolaget. For wine, the tax increases based on the wine's alcohol by volume. For 12% wine, the tax is 27.49 SEK per liter. For distilled products, the tax is 5.2697 SEK per % and liter (526.97 SEK per liter alcohol, or 263.48 SEK for 1 liter of 50%).

Alcohol tax rates in Sweden (in SEK)
	2008	2014	2015	2017–2022	2023	2024
Beer (per liter and alcohol by volume)
0.5% ABV ≤ 2.8% ABV	0.00	0.00	0.00	0.00	0.00	0.00
> 2.8% ABV	1.66	1.78	1.94	2.02	2.12	2.28
Wine and other fermented beverages (per liter)
1.2% ABV ≤ 2.25% ABV	0.00	0.00	0.00	0.00	0.00	0.00
2.25% ABV ≤ 4.5% ABV	7.58	8.11	8.84	9.19	9.65	10.38
4.5% ABV ≤ 7% ABV	11.20	11.98	13.06	13.58	14.26	15.34
7% ABV ≤ 8.5% ABV	15.41	16.49	17.97	18.69	19.62	21.12
8.5% ABV ≤ 15% ABV	21.58	23.09	25.17	26.18	27.49	29.58
15% ABV ≤ 18% ABV (Note: Wine only)	45.17	48.33	52.68	54.79	57.53	61.90
Intermediate products (per liter)
1.2% ABV ≤ 15% ABV	27.20	29.10	31.72	32.99	34.64	37.34
15% ABV ≤ 22% ABV	45.17	48.33	52.68	54.79	57.53	61.90
Distilled products (per liter of ethanol)
> 1.2% ABV	501.41	506.42	511.48	516.59	521.76	526.97

== History ==
In 1766 the Swedish king, Adolf Frederick, decided, after several unsuccessful attempts at regulating alcohol consumption, to abolish all restrictions. This led to virtually every household making and selling alcohol.

At the turn of the 19th century, alcohol was highly popular among Swedes. An estimated 175,000 home distilleries had developed by this time, using tremendous amounts of grain and potatoes that otherwise would have been consumed as food to manufacture alcohol. It was later said that most men in Sweden abused alcohol. Women rarely drank alcohol, since it was considered inappropriate.

In 1830, the first moderate drinking society was started in Stockholm. In 1837, the Svenska Sällskapet för Nykterhet och Folkbildning (The Swedish Society for Temperance and Public Education) was founded as the country's first fully-fledged temperance organization. It was immediately promoted by the King, and quickly grew to 10,000 members with local chapters around the country. The Church of Sweden also strongly promoted temperance. Private gain from selling alcohol was strongly criticised by these groups; this opinion was embraced by doctors and members of the Church of Sweden. In 1850, the state began to regulate alcohol. In the city of Falun, a regional organization was established to regulate all alcohol sales in the city and ensure that sales were being done responsibly.

In 1860, a bar was opened in Gothenburg where the state had handpicked the employees and decided how the bar should be run; antisocial and or intoxicated people were to be excluded. This was where people both bought and drank their alcohol, and this subsequently became the foundation for the Gothenburg Public House System used in Norway, Finland and the UK. This was also the year it became illegal to sell to people under the age of 18. Similar state-regulated bars and stores began to open in other towns across the country, and they were hugely successful. Originally the profits were kept privately by the owners, but in 1870 it was decided that all profits should go to the state.

During the First World War, alcohol was strictly rationed. Thus, the state bars and stores started registering purchases. People were allowed only two liters of liquor every three months, and beer above 3.6% ABV (2.8% ABW) was banned. After the war, the rationing continued, using the Bratt System of a household ration book called a motbok. Gender, income, wealth and social status decided how much alcohol one was allowed to buy. Unemployed people and welfare recipients were not allowed to buy any alcohol at all, while as the motbok was issued by household instead of per person, it meant that wives had to share their household allowance with their husbands and in effect got nothing at all. In 1917, Aktiebolaget Spritcentralen (now V&S Group) was formed to take over all wholesale distribution of alcohol. A referendum on prohibition in 1922 advised government not to issue total prohibition. The rationing system was very unpopular. When even the temperance movement protested against it (they felt it encouraged consumption), the government decided a new policy was needed.

In 1955, all regional alcohol monopolies (Systemaktiebolaget) were merged into the present-day Systembolaget enterprise, and the above-mentioned rationing system was abolished, so people were allowed to start buying as much alcohol as they wanted from Systembolaget stores (as long as they are sober, over 21 and not suspected of buying for later private resale). This led to increased consumption, so the government increased taxes heavily and made it compulsory that everyone had to show ID to get served. There was also an age limit of 21, which in 1969 was lowered to 20. In 1965, it became legal for privately run stores to sell beer up to 4.5% with an age limit of 18. 12 years later, after alcohol consumption – especially that of light beers (mellanöl) – rose dramatically, the limit was lowered to 3.5%.

Originally, Systembolaget customers were required to ask shop attendants or use desk service to retrieve desired products. This policy was based on the hypothesis that personal, face-to-face interaction would discourage patrons from buying in conspicuous quantities. Customers would not be permitted to serve themselves until 1991. This self service policy was gradually and subsequently expanded into all Systembolaget stores between 1991 and 2014. The last Systembolaget store to convert to self service was the branch at Högdalen in southern Stockholm, which was converted in October 2014. Still, several shops have their hard alcohol at the checkout where customers need to ask for it.

In September 1996, Systembolaget began sales of bag-in-box cask wine after the European Court of Justice ruled in favour of the Swedish brewery Spendrups who complained that Systembolaget's earlier refusal to sell boxed wine violated the EU's free trade agreement with Sweden. By the mid-2000s boxed wine accounted for over half the volume of wine sold at Systembolaget.

In 2003, an almost free quota (for personal use) was allowed when traveling into Sweden from another EU country, resulting in lower sales for Systembolaget, especially in Scania, which borders Denmark by sea with a bridge. Increase in Danish prices has resulted in people driving to Germany instead for purchase. Some cars have been stopped by Swedish police for overweight but not for alcohol import, since four people are collectively allowed to have a total of 800 liters of beer and wine, which is above the allowed load of many standard cars.

In June 2007, the European Court of Justice ruled that restrictions on the private import of alcohol by postal package were unjustified; as a result, Sweden allowed this some time after.

Swedish municipalities retain the right to ban the establishment of Systembolaget shops within their jurisdiction. This has become much rarer over time, because of a more liberal political attitude and the belief that other shops lose customers when people drive to other municipalities for shopping.

== Corruption controversy ==
A massive corruption scandal (Systembolagshärvan) first gained widespread media attention in the autumn of 2003, with Systembolaget issuing its first press release regarding the preliminary investigations on 7 November 2003. On 11 February 2005, 77 managers of Systembolaget stores were charged with receiving bribes from suppliers, and one of the largest trials in modern Swedish history followed. 18 managers were found guilty on 19 December, and then on 23 February another 15 managers were found guilty.

In January 2009 allegations were aimed against Fondberg & Co, the second largest supplier of wine to Systembolaget with a market share of 8.5%, concerning large payments made to the Gibraltar firm Bodegas, and are under investigation by the Swedish Tax Agency.

== Advertisements ==
Systembolaget makes advertisements on the side effects of drinking, and ones to encourage moderate consumption of alcohol. Many of their ads aim to stop teenagers obtaining alcohol and to encourage those under 25 to voluntarily show identification when purchasing. In November 2008, Systembolaget launched a campaign where people under 25 would get a free pack of chewing gum with a "Thank you for showing ID" compliment, if they showed ID to the cashier before they were asked to.

Systembolaget is not allowed to advertise its products to increase sales. However, since 2005 the producers are allowed to advertise their products in Sweden (only products of less than 15% alcohol, and not on radio and TV).

== Public opinion ==
=== Public opinion surveys on Systembolaget’s monopoly ===
Public attitudes toward Systembolaget’s retail monopoly are regularly measured through opinion surveys. In 2024, 68 percent of respondents stated that they support the monopoly—a level that has remained relatively stable over time, even after the possibility for other actors to sell alcohol remotely was introduced. The surveys show that a consistent majority believes the monopoly contributes to improved public health and more responsible alcohol consumption.

=== Trust and reputation ===
For several years, Systembolaget has ranked highly in trust surveys. In 2025, Systembolaget placed first in Verian’s Corporate Reputation Index and Verian's Corporate Sustainability Index, as well as in the Sustainable Brand Index. These results indicate that Systembolaget enjoys high levels of trust among Swedish consumers and is perceived as working long-term for the benefit of society, addressing issues related to climate, environment, and social sustainability—including public health and working conditions.

== See also ==
- Alcoholic drinks in Sweden
- State store
- Vinmonopolet
