= 1922 Swedish prohibition referendum =

- 27 August 1922
- [_] For the introduction of a complete prohibition of alcoholic beverages [_] Against the introduction of a complete prohibition of alcoholic beverages

Results
| Choice | Votes | % |
|---|---|---|
| ✔️ In favour | 889,132 | 49.01% |
| ❌ Against | 925,097 | 50.99% |
| Valid votes | 1,814,229 | 99.66% |
| Invalid or blank votes | 6,223 | 0.34% |
| Total votes | 1,820,452 | 100.00% |
| Registered voters/turnout | 3,302,483 | 55.12% |
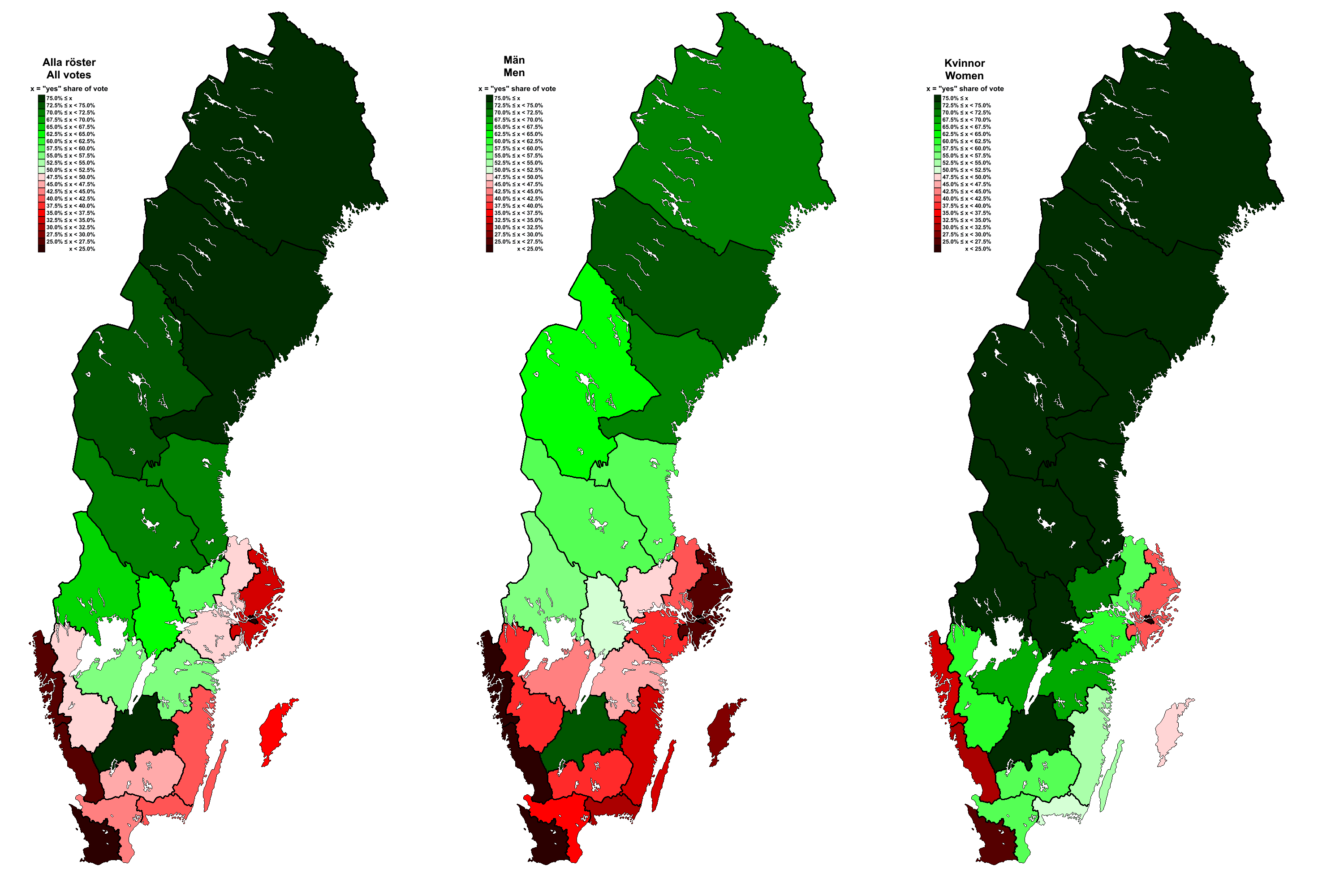
- Results by county

A non-binding referendum on prohibition of liquor was held in Sweden on 27 August 1922. The proposal to prohibit the sale of alcohol failed, with 51% voting against the change on a turnout of 55.1%. Voting patterns were sharply divided between men and women, with 59% of women voting for the proposal and 59% of men voting against.

== Campaign ==
There was plenty of campaigning from both sides, the best remembered poster being one designed by artist Albert Engström, with the famous quote Kräftor kräva dessa drycker ("crayfish require these drinks").

Both proponents and opponents of the prohibition used similar arguments based around the breakdown of family life and Swedish society.

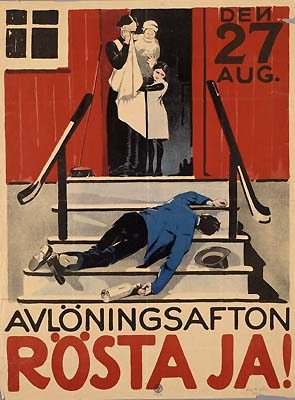
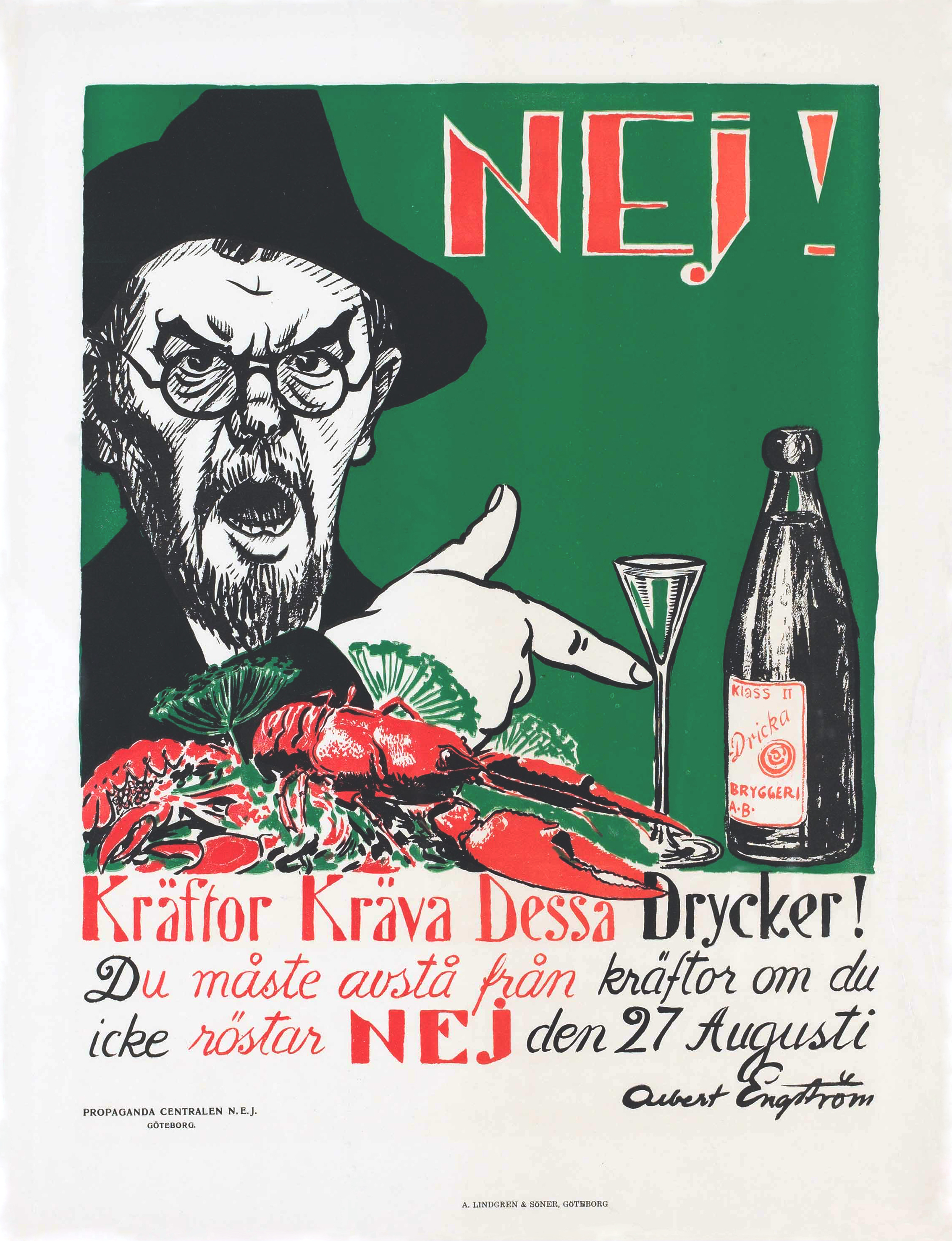
Left: "Payday evening — vote yes!"; A poster of a drunk husband in front of his weeping wife and children, encouraging voters to vote for prohibition
Right: "Crayfish require these drinks — You must abstain from crayfish if you do not vote no on 27 August"; A famous poster by Albert Engström, encouraging voters to vote against prohibition

== Result ==
| Choice | Votes | % |
|---|---|---|
| For | 889,132 | 49.01 |
| Against | 925,097 | 50.99 |
| Total | 1,814,229 | 100.00 |
| Valid votes | 1,814,229 | 99.66 |
| Invalid/blank votes | 6,223 | 0.34 |
| Total votes | 1,820,452 | 100.00 |
| Registered voters/turnout | 3,302,483 | 55.12 |
Source: Nationalencyklopedin

=== By county ===
| County | Total population | | | | Male | | | | Female | | | |
| County | For | | Against | | For | | Against | | For | | Against | |
| County | Votes | % | Votes | % | Votes | % | Votes | % | Votes | % | Votes | % |
|---|---|---|---|---|---|---|---|---|---|---|---|---|
| Stockholm Municipality | 21,928 | 13.5 | 141,034 | 86.5 | 7,680 | 10.0 | 69,503 | 90.0 | 14,248 | 16.6 | 71,531 | 83.4 |
| Stockholm County | 24,626 | 33.1 | 49,854 | 66.9 | 10,732 | 26.2 | 30,272 | 73.8 | 13,894 | 41.5 | 19,582 | 58.5 |
| Uppsala County | 21,834 | 49.0 | 22,749 | 51.0 | 9,719 | 40.7 | 14,179 | 59.3 | 12,115 | 58.6 | 8,570 | 41.4 |
| Södermanland County | 28,255 | 48.1 | 30,488 | 51.9 | 12,386 | 37.5 | 20,646 | 62.5 | 15,869 | 61.7 | 9,842 | 38.3 |
| Östergötland County | 50,686 | 56.3 | 39,422 | 43.7 | 22,418 | 45.7 | 26,598 | 54.3 | 28,268 | 68.8 | 12,824 | 31.2 |
| Jönköping County | 68,757 | 81.5 | 15,591 | 18.5 | 31,749 | 73.4 | 11,505 | 26.6 | 37,008 | 90.1 | 4,086 | 9.9 |
| Kronoberg County | 20,671 | 47.1 | 23,249 | 52.9 | 9,985 | 39.2 | 15,497 | 60.8 | 10,686 | 58.0 | 7,752 | 42.0 |
| Kalmar County | 24,590 | 41.9 | 34,059 | 58.1 | 11,389 | 33.5 | 22,624 | 66.5 | 13,201 | 53.6 | 11,435 | 46.4 |
| Gotland County | 6,875 | 37.3 | 11,550 | 62.7 | 3,010 | 28.4 | 7,573 | 71.6 | 3,865 | 49.3 | 3,977 | 50.7 |
| Blekinge County | 13,358 | 40.3 | 19,781 | 59.7 | 6,086 | 31.6 | 13,162 | 68.4 | 7,272 | 52.4 | 6,619 | 47.6 |
| Kristianstad County | 27,205 | 44.7 | 33,605 | 55.3 | 12,393 | 35.3 | 22,718 | 64.7 | 14,812 | 57.6 | 10,887 | 42.4 |
| Malmöhus County | 29,470 | 19.4 | 122,295 | 80.6 | 11,618 | 13.9 | 72,046 | 86.1 | 17,852 | 26.2 | 50,249 | 73.8 |
| Halland County | 10,872 | 25.1 | 32,501 | 74.9 | 4,692 | 19.4 | 19,503 | 80.6 | 6,180 | 32.2 | 12,998 | 67.8 |
| Gothenburg and Bohus County | 34,931 | 27.1 | 93,777 | 72.9 | 14,600 | 21.4 | 53,580 | 78.6 | 20,331 | 33.6 | 40,197 | 66.4 |
| Älvsborg County | 46,439 | 48.7 | 48,998 | 51.3 | 19,961 | 38.4 | 32,004 | 61.6 | 26,478 | 60.9 | 16,994 | 39.1 |
| Skaraborg County | 41,362 | 55.1 | 33,719 | 44.9 | 18,782 | 44.5 | 23,458 | 55.5 | 22,580 | 68.8 | 10,261 | 31.2 |
| Värmland County | 57,430 | 66.4 | 29,120 | 33.6 | 26,056 | 55.1 | 21,223 | 44.9 | 31,374 | 79.9 | 7,897 | 20.1 |
| Örebro County | 44,538 | 63.5 | 25,571 | 36.5 | 19,852 | 52.3 | 18,111 | 47.7 | 24,686 | 76.8 | 7,460 | 23.2 |
| Västmanland County | 30,831 | 58.8 | 21,631 | 41.2 | 13,782 | 47.8 | 15,077 | 52.2 | 17,049 | 72.2 | 6,554 | 27.8 |
| Kopparberg County | 60,587 | 70.3 | 25,538 | 29.7 | 27,424 | 59.6 | 18,568 | 40.4 | 33,163 | 82.6 | 6,970 | 17.4 |
| Gävleborg County | 58,434 | 70.5 | 24,438 | 29.5 | 26,233 | 59.2 | 18,088 | 40.8 | 32,201 | 83.5 | 6,350 | 16.5 |
| Västernorrland County | 58,597 | 78.4 | 16,159 | 21.6 | 28,654 | 70.8 | 11,803 | 29.2 | 29,943 | 87.3 | 4,356 | 12.7 |
| Jämtland County | 29,485 | 72.6 | 11,135 | 27.4 | 14,481 | 63.9 | 8,194 | 36.1 | 15,004 | 83.6 | 2,941 | 16.4 |
| Västerbotten County | 43,302 | 81.4 | 9,883 | 18.6 | 21,717 | 74.5 | 7,430 | 25.5 | 21,585 | 89.8 | 2,453 | 10.2 |
| Norrbotten County | 34,053 | 79.4 | 8,827 | 20.6 | 16,570 | 71.6 | 6,585 | 28.4 | 17,483 | 88.6 | 2,242 | 11.4 |
| Total | 889,116 | 49.0 | 924,974 | 51.0 | 401,969 | 40.9 | 579,947 | 59.1 | 487,147 | 58.5 | 345,027 | 41.5 |
Source: Förbudsomröstningens slutresultat

== See also ==
- Referendums in Sweden
- Alcohol in Sweden
- Swedish temperance movements
