= List of privatizations by country =

This list of privatizations provides links to notable and/or major privatizations.

== Argentina ==
- Aerolíneas Argentina (1990) – former national carrier; renationalized in 2009.
- Agua y Energía Eléctrica (1992–95) – national electricity production company; partitioned and sold.
- Buenos Aires Underground (1994) – given under concession but still owned by the State.
- Empresa Nacional de Correos y Telégrafos (ENCoTel, 1997) – given under concession as Correo Argentino. Re-nationalized in 2003.
- ENTel (national telecommunications company, 1990) – partitioned and sold to France Télécom and to Spanish Telefónica.
- Fábrica Militar de Aviones (FMA, 1995) – sold to Lockheed Martin.
- Ferrocarriles Argentinos (1991–95) – railway lines all over the country (partially re-nationalized).
- Gas del Estado (1992) – national gas company partitioned and sold, among others, to the Spanish Gas Natural company Naturgy.
- Obras Sanitarias de la Nación (water company, 1992–93) - given under concession to the French conglomerate Suez, which operated it under the name Aguas Argentinas; re-nationalized in 2006 as Aguas y Saneamientos Argentinos (AySA).
- Segba (1992) - partitioned and given under concession to Edesur, Edenor and Edelap.
- Yacimientos Petrolíferos Fiscales (YPF, 1991–92) – national oil-company sold to the Spanish Repsol. The Argentinian government in 2004 set up a new state oil company (Enarsa) from scratch, which proved of no use. In 2012, the Argentine Government expropriated 51% of the shares of YPF owned by Repsol.

== Australia ==
- Commonwealth Oil Refineries 1952 Under Liberal
- Optus 1985 Under Labor
- Commonwealth Bank of Australia 1991 Under Labor
- Qantas 1993 Under labor
- Commonwealth Serum Laboratories 1994 Under Labor
- Electricity and natural gas supply companies in Victoria 1995 Under Liberal
- Telstra 1997 Under Liberal
- Public transport in Melbourne 1999 Under Liberal
- Electricity Trust of South Australia 1999 Under Liberal
- Sydney Airport 2002 Under Liberal
- Medibank 2014 Under Liberal
- Commonwealth Industrial Gases
- Government Cleaning Service in New South Wales
- Government Insurance Office in New South Wales
- Government Printing Service in New South Wales
- State-owned betting-agencies in most states Under Liberal and Labor
- Many long-distance and urban passenger railway services Under Liberal and Labor
- All freight railway services Under Liberal and Labor
- Most State-owned banks Under Liberal and Labor

== Austria ==
=== 1950s ===
- Soviet Mineral Oil Administration (1955; partial privatization — a small portion of oil companies returned to Western owners; the majority transferred to the newly established state-owned OMV)
- Creditanstalt (1956–1997)
- Länderbank (1957; partial privatization — 40% of shares sold to private investors: 30% were non-voting preference shares, while the 10% voting shares were allocated to institutions affiliated with the SPÖ and ÖVP)

=== 1970s ===
- Siemens AG Österreich (1972; partial privatization — majority stake of 56.4% transferred to German parent company Siemens; Austrian state holding ÖIAG retained 43.6%))

=== 1980s ===
- Lenzing AG (1985–1990s; the privatization process began with its listing on the Vienna Stock Exchange — full state ownership was phased out during the 1990s)
- OMV (1987–96; government retains 31.5%)
- Berndorfer Metallwarenfabrik (1988; fully privatised through a management buyout)
- Verbund (1988; partial privatization through IPO — 49% of shares were listed on the Vienna Stock Exchange, the government retained 51%)

=== 1990s ===
- Simmering-Graz-Pauker (1992–1994; the company is now part of Siemens)
- voestalpine (1992–2005)
  - Voest-Alpine Eisenbahntechnik (1992–94; privatized in stages — became VAE, which was jointly acquired by voestalpine and Vossloh in 1998; fully owned by voestalpine by 2003 and now operates as voestalpine Railway Systems)
  - VA Technologie (1994–2005; partial privatisation began with IPO in 1994 — additional shares sold in 2003 and 2005; acquired by Siemens in 2005 and later integrated into Primetals Technologies)
  - Böhler-Uddeholm (1995–2003; IPO in 1995 — gradual reduction of state stake until full privatization by 2003)
  - Voest-Alpine Stahl AG (1995–2003; initial tranche of 31.7% sold in 1995 — further shares were divested in 2001 and 2003, completing full privatization)
  - VA Bergtechnik (1996)
  - Voest-Alpine Erzberg (2004)
- Austria Mikro Systeme International (1993–94; now operates as AMS-Osram)
- A.S.A. Abfall Service (1993; fully privatized through sale to Électricité de France — acquired by FCC Group in 2005 and now operates as FCC Austria)
- AT&S (1994)
- Schoeller-Bleckmann Oilfield Equipment (1995)
- Schoeller-Bleckmann Edelstahlrohr GesmbH (1995)
- Bernhard Steinel Werkzeugmaschinen GmbH (1995)
- Weiler Werkzeugmaschinen (1995)
- GIWOG-Wohnbaugruppe (1996)
- Vamed (1996; government retained 13% until 2024)
- AMAG Austria Metall AG (1996)
- Salinen Austria (1997)
- Mobilkom Austria (1997)
- Wiener Boerse (1999)
- Bank Austria (1997–98)
- Austria Tabak (1997, 1999, 2001)

=== 2000s ===
- Österreichische Postsparkasse (2000)
- Telekom Austria (2000–2006; privatisation began with an IPO in 2000 — additional tranches were sold over the following years, and the state retained a minority stake of 28.42% after 2006)
- Vienna International Airport (2000, 2001; regional governments of Vienna and Lower Austria retain 40%)
- Österreichische Staatsdruckerei (2000)
- Dorotheum (2001)
- Österreichischer Bundesverlag (2002; was a formerly state-owned educational publisher, responsible for producing school textbooks and other educational materials; today it's part of Klett Gruppe.)
- Strohal Rotations Druck (2002)
- BMG Metall und Recycling (2004)
- BUWOG (2004; privatised through sale to Immofinanz — later spun off and acquired by Vonovia, becoming part of the largest residential property group in Europe)
- Austrian Post (2006; government retains 52.8%)
- Bank Burgenland (2006; the regional state bank owned by the state of Burgenland was sold to GRAWE)
- Austrian Airlines (2009; acquired by Lufthansa Group)

=== 2010s ===
- Funkhaus Wien (2016)

=== 2020s ===
- EuroTeleSites (2023; partial privatization through IPO - A1 Telekom Austria Group spun off its radio tower division and listed it on the Vienna Stock Exchange; the state retains an indirect stake via ÖBAG)
- Vamed (2024; government sold its remaining 13% to Fresenius)
- Wiener Lokalbahnen Cargo (2025; sold to CER Cargo)
- Municipal housing in Wiener Neustadt (2026; 1,646 municipally owned apartments sold for €64.1 million; 610 units remained in municipal ownership).

== Bahrain ==
- Bahrain Telecommunications Co. (Q1 2005, $800 million)

== Brazil ==
- Banco do Estado do Maranhão S.A
- Banespa
- BB Turismo
- CEDAE
- CELMA
- CSN
- Eletrobras
- Embraer
- Embratel
- Light
- Petrobras Distribuidora
- RFFSA
- Sabesp
- Terminal Pesqueiro de Manaus
- Terminal Pesqueiro de Vitória
- Telebrás
- Usiminas
- Vale do Rio Doce
- VASP

== Canada ==
- Teleglobe (1987) – an international telco carrier
- Air Canada (1988)
- Potash Corporation of Saskatchewan (1989)
- Telus (1991), formerly Alberta Government Telephones
- Petro-Canada (1991)
- Nova Scotia Power (1992)
- Canadian National Railway (1995)
- Saskatchewan Wheat Pool (1996)
- Manitoba Telecom Services or MTS (1996)
- Highway 407 (1999) – leased to private operators
- Ontario Hydro (1999) – only partially privatized with Hydro One and Ontario Power Generation, a publicly owned company and crown corporation respectively
- Uranium industry in Saskatchewan

== Chile ==
- CAP S.A.
- Chilectra
- Colbún S.A.
- CTC
- Enaex
- Empremar
- Endesa
- Entel
- Esval
- IANSA
- Lan Airlines
- Pension Funds (AFP)
- Soquimich

== Czechoslovakia ==
- Virtually everything after the Velvet Revolution in 1989; see voucher privatization for details.

== Egypt ==
Abt Associates Inc.; sponsored by Government of Egypt, Ministry of Agriculture and Land Reclamation and United States Agency for International Development; November 2000. Retrieved 20 April 2011. In 2011, STIA, also known as El Nasr Wool & Selected Textiles, of Alexandria, remained "one of the largest public sector textiles companies."

- biscomisr
- corona Company for foods industries (former Alexandria Confectionary and Chocolate)
- Alexbank
- Heliopark
- Telemisr
- Abu Qir Fertilizers and Chemicals Industries Company
- Abou Zaabal Fertlizers and Chemicals Industries Company
- Egyptian Financial Industrial company (EFIC)
- Eastern Company for Tobacco and Cigarettes
- Alexandria Container & Cargo Handling Company
- Commercial International Bank
- Madinet Masr For Housing and Development (former Madinet Nasr For Housing and Development)
- Vodafone Egypt (former Masr Fone "click")
- Orange Egypt (former Mobinil)
- Ezz Steel (former Alexandria alwatania for Iron and Steel)
- e-finance
- Ideal (former Industrial Delta Company)
- Al-Ahram Beverages Company
- Pachin paints
- Quicktel
- Elnasr for Clothing and Textiles "KAPO"
- Alexandria for spining and textiles "spinalex"
- pepsi cola Egypt
- Cocacola Egypt
- schweppes Egypt
- AZRIMOT EGYPT (Former Al Ahli Financial Investments Management Company "AFIM")
- Al-Ahli Real Estate Development (Alahli-Sabbour)
- Telecom Egypt (Privatizated 30% )
- Ras El Hekma agreement with Abu Dhabi–based ADQ
- Suez Cement
- Helwan Cement
- Torah Portland Cement
- South Valley Cement
- Alexandria Cement
- Ameriyah Cement
- Assuit cement
- Bani suif Cement
- Egypt Free Shops
- Egyptian Starch & Glucose
- Egyptian Electro Cables
- Modern Textiles (Bolivara) was taken over & merged by United Arab for Spinning and Weaving (UNIRAB)
- Kafr El Zayat for Insecticides
- Arabia Cotton Ginning
- Nile Cotton Ginning
- Middle East Co. for Paper SIMO
- Siklam Dairy Products Factory
- San Stepheno Hotel : Lands and Premises
- Sheraton Hotels and Resorts Egypt
- Le Méridien hotel Egypt
- Legacy Hotels Company
- Helnan hotel Egypt
- Sonesta hotel Egypt
- Semiramis InterContinental Hotel Egypt

== Finland ==
- Finnair
- Sonera (former Telecom Finland)

== France ==
=== 1980s ===
- Compagnie Générale d'Electricité became Alcatel (1987)
- Havas (1987)
- IN Groupe (1993)
- Matra (1988)
- Paribas – privatized in 1987 and merged with BNP to form BNP Paribas
- Saint-Gobain – created in 1665 by minister of Finance Jean-Baptiste Colbert; privatized in 1986
- Société Générale privatized in 1987
- Suez – privatized and merged with the stated-owned Gaz de France (GDF) in 2008 to form GDF Suez
- TF1 – first TV channel of France, privatized in 1987

=== 1990s ===
- Arcelor (1995)
- Assurances Générales de France (1996)
- Groupe Bull (1997)
- CNP Assurances (1998)
- Compagnie générale transatlantique (1996) – merged with CMA to form CMA CGM
- Crédit Industriel et Commercial (1998)
- Crédit local de France (1991)
- Le Crédit Lyonnais (1999)
- Elf Aquitaine – privatized in 1994; absorbed by Total
- Eramet (1999)
- Gan (1998)
- Pechiney (1995)
- Renault (1996) – the French state still have 15.01% of the shareholding
- SEITA (1995) – now Altadis
- Total
- Union des Assurances de Paris (1994)

=== 2000s ===
- Aéroports de Paris – the French State remains the major shareholder: 52%
- Air France – opening shareholding open in 1999. Merged with KLM and merged to form: Air France-KLM (as 2004, the French State remain 44%). As of 2012, the French State remains 15.8%.
- Électricité de France (EDF) (in December 2005 France sold 30% of EDF)
- French Highway Concession
  - A'lienor – sold to Eiffage (65%) and Société des Autoroutes du Nord et de l'Est de la France (35%)
  - Alis – sold to Société des Autoroutes du Nord et de l'Est de la France
  - Société des Autoroutes de Paris Normandie – sold to Vinci
  - Société des Autoroutes du Nord et de l'Est de la France – sold to Abertis (52,5%); the rest is owned by other investors
  - Autoroutes Paris-Rhin-Rhône – sold to Eiffage
  - Autoroutes du Sud de la France – sold to Vinci
  - Arcour – sold to Vinci
  - Atlandes – sold to Colas Group (subsidiaries of Bouygues) and other investors
  - Cofiroute – sold to Vinci
- Gaz de France (GDF) – Prime minister Dominique de Villepin announced a merger between GDF and Suez; since the state owns 80% of GDF, a privatization of GDF would require the passing of a new law; the state would control only 34% of the capital of the new group: see commentary.
- Orange S.A. (formerly France Télécom) (the French State has owned under 50% of Orange since September 2004) – the French State remains (including ERAP): 26,94%
- Pages Jaunes (Yellow Pages) (in 2004 France sold 32% of Pages Jaunes for €1.25 billion)
- Snecma (in 2004 France sold 35% of Snecma for €1.45 billion)
- Société nationale industrielle aérospatiale (2000) – merged with DASA and CASA to form the European Aeronautic Defence and Space Company
- Thomson Multimédia
  - Thomson Multimédia – now Technicolor
  - Thomson-CSF – now Thales Group; the French State remains 27%
- SNCM (Société Nationale Maritime Corse Méditerranée) – ferry-company; privatized at the end of 2005; the French State remains 25% in SNCM

=== 2010s ===
- Française des Jeux (FDJ) – in 2019 the French State sold off around 50% of its shares retaining 20%

== Germany ==
- 1921: UFA
- 1960: Volkswagen Group (the Lower Saxony still retains an 11.8% stake)
- 1965-87: VEBA (now part of E.ON)
- 1966-97: Lufthansa
- 1986-88: VIAG (now part of E.ON)
- Deutsche Bundespost became in January 1995:
  - Deutsche Post – the state owns 16.45% through the KfW.
  - Deutsche Telekom – the state still owns 27.8%, partly direct and partly through the KfW.
  - Deutsche Postbank – in 2004 the state floated a minority stake for €2.5 billion

== Greece ==
- DESFA – On 20 December 2018, a consortium formed by Snam (60%), Enagás (20%) and Fluxys (20%) completed the acquisition of a 66% stake in DESFA for an amount of €535 million.
- Hellenic Petroleum – Starting from the 1990s, the Greek Government gradually sold its shares in the company, and currently owns only 35.5% of the shares.
- Hellenic Vehicle Industry (ELVO) – In December 2020, 79% of the shares were acquired by an Israeli consortium formed by Plasan and SK Group. The Hellenic state continues to retains 21% of the shares.
- Olympic Airways – at first, then Olympic Airlines; the Hellenic State attempted to privatise the ailing airlines five times, more or less, from 2004 onwards. The company was folded and re-created in 2009, and privatized in 2012, under the supervision of the EU and IMF, as it was part of the debt-restructuring process of 2012.
- OPAP (Lottery and Betting Monopoly) – privatization completed in 2013, when the last remaining government-owned stock was sold
- OTE (Οργανισμός Τηλεπικοινωνιών Ελλάδος / Hellenic Telecommunications Company) – became partly privatised in the 1990s, when its only shareholder at the time, the Hellenic State, reduced its share of the company to 36%. Since May 2018, Deutsche Telekom owns 45% of the shares, and the Hellenic State has retained 5%.
- Piraeus Port Authority – In April 2016, HRADF sold 51% of Piraeus Port Authority to the COSCO Group.
- Public Power Corporation – In 2001, PPC carried out a share flotation on the Athens Stock Exchange and consequently was no longer wholly owned by the government, although it was still controlled by it with a 51.12% stake until 2021. The company was privatised in November 2021, when the Greek government decreased its shareholding to 34.12% and transferred it to the Greek sovereign wealth fund, the Hellenic Corporation of Assets and Participations (HCAP).
- Thessaloniki Port Authority – In March 2018, an international consortium acquired 67% of the shares, with the Hellenic State retaining 7.27%.
- TrainOSE – It was acquired in September 2017 by the Italian railway company, Ferrovie dello Stato Italiane.

== Hong Kong ==
- Hong Kong Mail Service
- Link REIT
- MTR Corporation

== Iceland ==
- Búnaðarbanki Íslands hf – privatized in 1999–2003
- Landsbanki Íslands hf – privatized in 1999–2003
- Landssími Íslands hf – privatized in 2005
- Skýrr hf – privatized in 1997–1998

== India ==
- Air India – sold to Tata Group in 2020
- Bharat Aluminium Company – sold to Vedanta Limited in 2000
- CMC Limited – sold to Tata Consultancy Services in 2001
- Lagan Engineering – in 2001
- Hindustan Zinc Limited – sold to Vedanta Limited in 2001
- Maruti Udyog Limited later became a joint venture between Suzuki and Government of India, now known as Maruti Suzuki
- Modern Food Industries – sold to Hindustan Unilever in 2000
- Videsh Sanchar Nigam Limited – sold to Tata Group in 2002
- Paradeep Phosphates Limited - sold to Adventz Group in 2002
- Jessop & Company – sold to Ruia Group in 2003
- Indian Petrochemicals Corporation Limited – sold to Reliance Industries
- Hindustan Petroleum - sold to Oil and Natural Gas Corporation in 2017
- IDFC First Bank - privatized through IPO and IDFC-IDFC Bank reverse bank
- Protean eGov Technologies - privatized through IPO
- NSDL - privatized through IPO
- Ferro Scrap Nigam Limited(FSNL) - handed over to Japan's Konoike Transport Co. Ltd.
- Indian Medicines Pharmaceutical Corporation Ltd (IMPCL) sold to Skymap Pharmaceutical Pvt Limited in 2026.
- Following Airports:
  - Jaipur International Airport – owned and operated by public–private consortium led by Adani Group
  - Cochin International Airport
  - Mangalore International Airport – owned and operated by public–private consortium led by Adani Group
  - Thiruvananthapuram International Airport – owned and operated by public–private consortium led by Adani Group
  - Indira Gandhi International Airport - Delhi – owned and operated by public–private consortium led by GMR Group
  - Chaudhary Charan Singh Airport - Lucknow – owned and operated by public–private consortium led by Adani Group
  - Rajiv Gandhi International Airport - Hyderabad – owned and operated by public–private consortium led by GMR Group
  - Chhatrapati Shivaji Maharaj International Airport - Mumbai – owned and operated by public–private consortium led by Adani Group
  - Sardar Vallabhbhai Patel International Airport - Ahmedabad – owned and operated by public–private consortium led by Adani Group
  - Lokpriya Gopinath Bordoloi International Airport - Guwahati – owned and operated by public–private consortium led by Adani Group

== Indonesia ==
- Aneka Gas Industri (partially sold to Messer Group and PT Tira Austenite in 1996, fully sold to Samator Gas in 2004)
- Indosat (sold to Temasek Holdings in 2002–2003)

== Iraq ==
- (planned) most industries except oil, at the behest of the United States-sponsored government

== Ireland ==
- ACCBank – sold to Rabobank
- Aer Lingus – floated on the stock market
- AIB – after the 2008 financial crisis, the bank was nationalised; the Irish Government still retains a 12.5% stake.
- British and Irish Steampacket Company Limited – sold to Irish Continental Group
- Cablelink – sold to NTL Ireland; formerly held 50/50 by Telecom Éireann and Raidió Teilifís Éireann, both state-owned at the time
- ICC Bank – sold to Bank of Scotland
- Irish Life – sold to Irish Permanent
- Irish National Petroleum Corporation – all assets sold to ConocoPhillips, still exists in law
- Irish Steel – acquired by affiliates of Ispat Steel
- Irish Sugar – floated on stock market as Greencore; state retains one share for veto purposes
- Nítrigin Éireann – sold to its other shareholder in Irish Fertiliser Industries, Richardsons, final firm called IFI, no longer exists
- Telecom Éireann – floated on the stock market
- TSB Bank – bought by Irish Life and Permanent from the Government of Ireland in 2001

== Israel ==
- Bezeq
- El Al
- Bank Hapoalim
- Bank Leumi (partial)
- Israel Chemicals
- Israel Discount Bank (partial)
- RAFAEL Armament Development Authority (partial)
- Zim Integrated Shipping Services

== Italy ==
- INA Assitalia
- ITA Airways acquired by Lufthansa Group
- Enel S.p.A. (1999 32% €16.6 billion, 2003 6.6% €2.2 billion, 2004 20% €7.5 billion)
- Eni
- IRI (among which are Autostrade s.p.a., Credito Italiano)
- Telecom Italia
- Terna (Enel sold 43.5% for €1.48 billion in June 2004)

== Japan ==
- Japan Airlines
- Japan Highway Public Corporation (only converted into three regional joint-stock companies which are all remaining wholly state-owned)
- Japan Post (half-privatized; the state must by law own one-third)
- Japan Railways Group (formerly Japanese National Railways)
- Japan Tobacco (the state must by law own one-third)
- New Tokyo International Airport Authority (Narita Airport) (only converted into joint-stock company which remains wholly state-owned)
- Nippon Express
- Nippon Telegraph and Telephone (the state must by law own one-third)

== Jordan ==
- Aramex International (Q1 2005, 75% for $150–200 million)
- Jordan Telecom
- Queen Alia International Airport

== South Korea ==
- Korea Electric Power (KEPCO; half-privatized)
- Korea Telecom
- KOGAS
- KT&G (Korea Tobacco & Ginseng)
- POSCO (Pohang Iron & Steel)

== Kuwait ==
- Kuwait Finance House (November 2004, 25% of the company for $1 billion)

== Malaysia ==
- Johor Water Corporation
- Keretapi Tanah Melayu Berhad – national railway company
- Malaysia Airlines
- Malaysia Airports Holdings
- Pasir Gudang Local Authority
- Pos Malaysia – national postal services
- Senai International Airport
- Telekom Malaysia
- Tenaga National Berhad – national electricity-generation and distribution

== Mexico ==
1,150 public companies, including banks, railroads, the telephone company, mines, roads, TV stations, ports, airports, airlines, sugar mills, and retirement funds.

== Netherlands ==
- PTT, the mail and telecom company

== New Zealand ==
- Air New Zealand – privatized in 1989, subsequently rescued by the Government of New Zealand in 2001
- Auckland Airport
- Bank of New Zealand – semi-privatized in 1987; rescued by the Crown in 1990; sold off in 1992
- Electricity Corporation of New Zealand (ECNZ) – part of which became privatized as Contact Energy in the period 1995–1998
- Government Print
- Ministry of Works and Development
- Natural Gas Corporation (NGC), ultimately absorbed into Vector Limited
- New Zealand Steel – privatized from 1987, now part of BlueScope
- The Post Office Savings Bank (POSB) – bought by the ANZ Bank in 1989
- Telecom New Zealand – privatized in 1990
- New Zealand Rail Limited – privatized in 1993, became Tranz Rail Limited in 1995; the government subsequently repurchased the track lease
- various council-controlled organisations formerly owned by territorial authorities: see also Local Authority Trading Enterprises (LATEs)

== Norway ==
- Arcus (sold to Sucra in 2001)
- Christiania Bank og Kreditkasse (sold to Nordea in 2000)
- DnB NOR (floated on the stock market in 1995, government retains 34%)
- Finnmark Fylkesrederi og Ruteselskap (sold to Veolia Transport Norge in 2003)
- Fredrikstad Energi (49% sold to Fortum)
- Kongsberg Gruppen (floated on the stock market in 1993, government retains 50%)
- Norsk Medisinaldepot (sold to Celesio in 2001)
- NSB Gods (now CargoNet, partially sold to Green Cargo in 2002, NSB retains 55%)
- Oslo Energi (parts merged with Hafslund)
- Postbanken (merged with DnB NOR in 1999)
- Statkorn (floated on the stock market as Cermaq in 2000, government retains 44%)
- Statoil (floated on the stock market in 2001, government retains 71%)
- Telenor (floated on the stock market in 2000, government retains 54%)
- TrønderBilene (66% sold to Fosen Trafikklag in 1999)
- Østfold Energi (parts sold to Fortum in 2001)
- Årdal og Sunndal Verk (merged with Norsk Hydro in 1986)

== Pakistan ==
- National Refinery Limited (acquired by Attock Group of Companies in July 2005)
- Pakistan Telecom sold out to Eitisalat in 2006.

== Peru ==
- AeroPeru – Peruvian Air Transport Enterprise (sold to Aeroméxico in 1993, closed in 1999)
- ENATRU – National Urban Transport Enterprise (sold to the employees)
- Empresa Regional de Servicio Público de Electricidad del Sur Medio – ELECTRODUNAS (Sold to HICA)
- SIDERPERU (Sold to Sider Corporation S.A)
- PESCAPERU – Fishing National Enterprise
- MINEROPERU – Peruvian National Mining Company
- Tintaya (sold to Magma Copper Corporation)
- Ilo Mining (sold to Southern Peru Copper Corporation, and since 2018 is part of Grupo Mexico)
- Centromin – Mining of Central Peru
- Hierro Peru (Sold to Shougang Group)
- National Company of Gas – SOL GAS (sold to Repsol)
- EDEGEL (sold to Endesa in 1996, since 2016 is part of Enel)
- ENAFER (Parts of Peru Rail, Fetransa and FCCA)
- CPT – ENTEL (Sold to Telefónica in 1994)
- EDELNOR (sold to Endesa in 1994, since 2016 is part of Enel)
- EDELSUR (sold to Sempra Energy in 1994, since 2019 is part of CTG)
- Banco Continental del Peru (Sold to BBV and since 1999 part of BBVA)
- Inter bank (Part of Banco Internacional del Peru)

== Philippines ==
- Manila Hotel – was acquired by the Insular Government through the Manila Railroad Company in 1919, re-privatized in 1995.
- Metro Manila Transit Corporation – split into four private companies in the 1990s.
- National Sugar Trading Corporation (NASUTRA) – Former state monopoly, split in 1986 into its various predecessors.
- Philippine National Bank – 1989–2005
- Radio Philippines Network – 80% privatized since 2014.

== Poland ==
- Telekomunikacja Polska S.A.

== Portugal ==
- ANA – Aeroportos de Portugal (Portuguese airports)
- CIMPOR
- CTT – Portuguese post
- EDP – Energia de Portugal
- Fidelidade – the insurance part of the CGD public bank
- Galp Energia – national petroleum company
- Portugal Telecom – national telecommunications company
- REN – Rede Eléctrica Nacional
- TAP – airline

== Qatar ==
- Qatargas (now QatarEnergy LNG) – liquefied natural gas company (Q1 2005, 50% for $600 million)

== Romania ==
- Rompetrol – petroleum company (1993 & 1998)
- Ursus Breweries – beer brewer and distributor (1996)
- Romcim (now Lafarge Romania) – industrial materials company (1997)
- Casial Hunedoara (now HeidelbergCement Romania) – industrial materials company (1997)
- Romtelecom (now Telekom Romania) – telecommunications company (1998 & 2003)
- BRD – Groupe Société Générale – bank (1999)
- Automobile Dacia – car manufacturer (1999)
- Astra Rail Industries – rail vehicle manufacturer (1999 & 2000)
- Petromidia Refinery – oil refinery (2000)
- Sidex (now ArcelorMittal Galați) – steelworks (2001)
- Alro – aluminium company (2002)
- Petrom – petroleum company (2004)
- Banca Comercială Română – bank (2003 & 2006)
- Electrica – electricity distributor (2006, 2008 & 2014)
- Automobile Craiova (now Ford Romania) – car manufacturer (2007)

== Russia ==
A wide-scale privatization program was launched in 1992–1994, using a voucher privatization scheme; from 1995, a monetary scheme was used.

- Gazprom (1994)
- LUKoil (1995)
- Mechel (1995)
- MMC Norilsk Nickel (1995)
- Novolipetsk Steel (1995)
- Surgutneftegaz (1995)
- YUKOS (1995)

== Saudi Arabia ==
- Al-Bilad Bank (2008, 50%)
- Bank Al-Inma (2008, 70%)
- Government Hotels (2005, 100% of King Abdullah International Convention Centre in Jeddah and Ritz Carlton in Riyadh)
- Maaden (2008, 50%)
- National Commercial Bank (2014, 25%)
- Riyad Bank (2008, 58%)
- SABIC (1984, 30%)
- Saudi Arabian Airlines (2006, split into 10 business units, 5 of which were privatized)
- Saudi Electric Company (2000, 26%)
- Saudi Ports (1997, 27 management contracts were given out to various ports around the Kingdom)
- Saudi Real Estate Company (2003, 50%)
- Saudi Telecom Company (2002, 30%)

== Singapore ==
- Port of Singapore Authority (1997)
- Post Office Savings Bank (bought by DBS Bank in 1998 and rebranded as POSBank)
- Singapore Broadcasting Corporation (1994, as the Television Corporation of Singapore; later renamed MediaCorp in 2001) – owned by the government through government-owned investment firms
- Singapore Post – owned by the government through government-owned investment firms
- Singapore Power – owned by the government through government-owned investment firms
- Singapore Telecommunications (1992) – owned by the government through government-owned investment firms

== South Africa ==
- Iscor – Now known as ArcelorMittal South Africa, the company was privatised in 1989.
- Telkom – Gradually privatised starting with the IPO in 2003. The government currently holds 39%, and is planning on selling its entire stake.

== Spain ==
- Aceralia
- Argentaria
- ENDESA (1988–1998)
- Gas Natural
- Iberia Airlines (2001)
- Indra
- Red Electrica de España
- Repsol (1989–1997)
- Retevision
- SEAT (1986)
- Tabacalera

== Sweden ==
=== 1980s ===
- ASEA-ATOM (1981) -
- Luxor AB (1984)
- SSAB (1986–1994)
- UV Shipping (1988)

=== 1990s ===
- AssiDomän
- Celsius
- Cementa
- Enator
- Företagskapital
- Industrikredit AB
- Lantbrukskredit AB
- Nordbanken (partial)
- OK Petroleum
- Pharmacia
- Pharmacia & Upjohn
- SAKAB
- SAQ Kontrol
- SBL Vaccin
- SEMKO
- SSAB (wholly privatised in 1994)
- Stadshypotek AB
- Svalöf Weibull AB
- Svensk Fastighetsvärdering
- Svenska Statens Språkresor AB
- Swedish Real Estate Valuation Corp
- VPC AB

=== 2000s ===
- Celsius AB
- Grängesbergs Gruvor
- Kurortsverksamhet
- Nordbanken
- OMX – stock exchange – shares sold to Borse Dubai for 2.1 billion SEK.
- SAKAB
- SGAB
- Svenska Lagerhus
- Svenska
- Vin & Sprit – sold to Pernod Ricard for 5.626 billion euro

=== 2010s ===
- Nordea (19.5% owned by Swedish government)

=== Planned privatisations ===
- Apoteket (partial, 2009)
- SBAB
- SAS (50% owned by Swedish, Danish, Norwegian governments)
- Telia Sonera (37.3% owned by the Swedish government)

== Turkey ==
(Listing Scope >US $10 M.)

=== 1980s ===
- Ankara Çimento
- Ansan-Meda
- Balikesi̇r Çimento
- Pinarhi̇sar Çimento
- Söke Çimento

=== 1990s ===
- Adiyaman Çimento
- Anadolubank
- Aşkale Çimento
- Bartin Çimento
- Bozüyük Seramik
- Çİnkur
- Çorum Çimento
- Denİzbank
- Denİzlİ Çimento
- Elaziğ Çimento
- Erganİ Çimento
- Etİbank
- Fİlyos
- Gazİantep Çimento
- Güneş Sigorta Spor Kulübü
- Havaş
- Ipragaz
- İskenderun Çimento
- Kars Çimento
- Konya Krom Man.A.Ş.
- Kümaş
- Kurtalan Çimento
- Ladİk Çimento
- Lalapaşa Çimento
- Metaş
- Petlas
- Ray Sigorta
- Şanliurfa Çimento
- Sİvas Çimento
- Sümerbank
- Trabzon Çimento
- Türk Kablo
- Tofaş S.K.
- Van Çimento Sanayii
- Yarimca Porselen T.A.Ş.

=== 2000s ===
- Adapazarı Sugar Fac.
- Asİl Çelİk
- Ataköy Hotel
- Ataköy Marina
- Ataköy Tourism
- Başak Insurance
- Başak Retirement Fund
- Bet Kütahya Şeker
- Bursagaz
- Çayelİ Bakir İşl.A.Ş.
- Cyprus Turkish Airlines
- Denİz Naklİyati T.A.Ş.
- Esgaz
- Eti Aluminium
- Etİ Bakir
- Etİ Elektrometalurji
- Etİ Gümüş A.Ş.
- Etİ Krom A.Ş.
- Güven Sİgorta
- Dİv-Han
- Taksan
- Türk Telekom

== Ukraine ==
- Kryvorizhstal

== United Arab Emirates ==
- Damas Jewelry (November 2004, 55% of the company for $224 million)

== United Kingdom ==
=== 1970s ===
- British Petroleum (1977, 1979, 1981, 1983, 1987)
- British Sugar (1977, 1982)
- Cambridge Instrument Company (1979)
- International Computers Limited (1979)
- Lunn Poly (1971)
- Rolls-Royce Motors (1973)
- Sinclair Radionics (1979)
- State Management Scheme (1973)
- Thomas Cook (1972)

=== 1980s ===
- Alfred Herbert (1980)
- Amersham International (1982)
- Associated British Ports (1983, 1984)
- British Aerospace (1981, 1985)
- British Airports Authority (1987)
- British Airways (1987)
- British Airways Helicopters (1986)
- British Gas (1986)
- British Leyland
  - Alvis (1981)
  - Coventry Climax (1982)
  - Danish Automobile Building (1987)
  - ISTEL (1987)
  - Jaguar (1984)
  - Leyland Bus (1987)
  - Leyland Tractors (1982)
  - Leyland Trucks (1987)
  - Rover Group (1988)
  - Unipart (1987)
- British Rail Engineering Limited (1989)
- British Shipbuilders (1985–1989, shipbuilder companies sold individually)
- British Steel (1988)
- British Telecom (1984, 1991, 1993)
- British Transport Hotels (1983)
- Britoil (1982, 1985)
- Cable & Wireless (1981, 1983, 1985)
- Council houses (1980–present, over two million sold to their tenants) – see main article Right to buy scheme
- Crown post offices (1989–2025, branches sold individually as franchises)
- Enterprise Oil (1984)
- Fairey (1980)
- Ferranti (1982)
- Harland & Wolff (1989)
- Inmos (1984)
- Johnson Matthey Bankers (1986)
- Municipal bus companies (1988–present, bus companies sold individually) – see main article Bus deregulation in Great Britain
- National Bus Company (1986–1988, bus companies sold individually)
- National Express (1988)
- National Freight Corporation (1982)
- Passenger transport executive bus companies (1988–1994, bus companies sold individually)
- Rolls-Royce (1987)
- Royal Ordnance (1987)
- Sealink (1984)
- Short Brothers (1989)
- Travellers Fare (1988)
- Trustee Savings Bank (1985)
- Vale of Rheidol Railway (1989)
- Water companies – see main article Water privatisation in England and Wales
  - Anglian Water (1989)
  - North West Water (1989)
  - Northumbrian Water (1989)
  - Severn Trent (1989)
  - South West Water (1989)
  - Southern Water (1989)
  - Thames Water (1989)
  - Welsh Water (1989)
  - Wessex Water (1989)
  - Yorkshire Water (1989)

=== 1990s ===
- AEA Technology (1996)
- Agricultural Development and Advisory Service (1997)
- Belfast International Airport (1994)
- Birmingham Airport (1993 – 51%)
- Bournemouth Airport (1995)
- Bristol Airport (1997, 2001)
- British Coal (1994)
- British Energy (1996, 2007, 2009)
- British Rail – see main article Privatisation of British Rail
  - 3 rolling stock companies:
    - Angel Trains (1996)
    - Eversholt Leasing (1996)
    - Porterbrook (1996)
  - 6 design office units (1995–1997, sold individually)
  - 6 freight operating companies
    - Freightliner (1995)
    - Loadhaul (1996)
    - Mainline Freight (1996)
    - Rail Express Systems (1996)
    - Railfreight Distribution (1997)
    - Transrail Freight (1996)
  - 6 track renewal units (1995–1997, sold individually)
  - 7 infrastructure maintenance units (1995–1997, sold individually)
  - 25 train operating companies (1996, operations contracted out as franchises)
  - British Rail Research (1996)
  - British Rail Telecommunications (1995)
  - European Passenger Services (1996)
  - Railtrack (1996) (18 October 2002 went into voluntary liquidation), now in public ownership as Network Rail
  - Red Star Parcels (1995)
  - Union Railways (1996)
- British Technology Group (1992)
- Building Research Establishment (1997)
- Cardiff Airport (1995)
- Central Electricity Generating Board
  - National Grid (1990)
  - National Power (1991, 1995)
  - Powergen (1991, 1995)
- Chessington Computer Centre (1996)
- Civil Aviation Authority (1996, Flight Calibration Services business)
- Crown Agents (1997)
- Dairy Crest (1996)
- East Midlands Airport (1993)
- Export Credits Guarantee Department (1991, short term credit business)
- Girobank (1990)
- Humberside Airport (1999 – 82%)
- Kingston Communications (1999, 2007)
- Laboratory of the Government Chemist (1996)
- Liverpool Airport (1990, 2001)
- London Buses (1994, bus companies sold individually) – see main article Privatisation of London bus services
- London Luton Airport (1997)
- London Southend Airport (1993)
- Mersey Docks and Harbour Company (1998)
- Military houses (1996)
- National Engineering Laboratory (1995)
- National Savings Bank (1999, back office functions contracted out)
- National Transcommunications Limited (1990)
- Natural Resources Institute (1996)
- Northern Ireland Electricity (1993)
  - Ballylumford power station (1992)
  - Belfast West power station (1992)
  - Coolkeeragh power station (1992)
  - Kilroot power station (1992)
- Property Services Agency (1994)
- Regional electricity companies
  - East Midlands Electricity (1990)
  - Eastern Electricity (1990)
  - London Electricity (1990)
  - MANWEB (1990)
  - Midlands Electricity (1990)
  - Northern Electric (1990)
  - NORWEB (1990)
  - SEEBOARD (1990)
  - Southern Electric (1990)
  - SWALEC (1990)
  - SWEB Energy (1990)
  - Yorkshire Electricity (1990)
- Royal Dockyards
  - Devonport Dockyard (1993)
  - Portsmouth Dockyard (1998)
  - Rosyth Dockyard (1997)
- Scottish Bus Group (1991, bus companies sold individually)
- Scottish Hydro-Electric (1991)
- Scottish Power (1991)
- Severn Bridge (1992)
- The Stationery Office (1996)
- Student Loans (1998, 1999, 2013, mortgage–style loans)
- Transport Research Laboratory (1996)
- Trust Ports
  - Clyde (1992)
  - Dundee (1995)
  - Forth (1992)
  - Ipswich (1997)
  - Medway (1992)
  - Tees and Hartlepool (1992)
  - Tilbury (1992)

=== 2000s ===
- Actis (2004, 2012)
- BBC Books (2006 – 85%)
- BBC Broadcast (2005)
- BBC Costumes and Wigs (2008)
- BBC Outside Broadcasts (2008)
- BBC Technology (2004)
- British Nuclear Fuels Limited
  - AWE Management Limited (2008)
  - BNG America (2007)
  - BNG Project Services (2008)
  - Reactor Sites Management Company (2007)
  - Westinghouse Electric Company (2006)
- East Thames Buses (2009)
- Leeds Bradford Airport (2007)
- London Underground (2003, sale of concession to maintain infrastructure for 30 years)
- National Air Traffic Services (2001 – 51%)
- Newcastle Airport (2001 – 49%)
- Partnerships UK (2000, 2011)
- Qinetiq (2002, 2006, 2008)
- South Eastern Trains (2006)
- Teesside International Airport (2003 – 75%)
- UKAEA Limited (2009)

=== 2010s ===
- BBC Audiobooks (2010, 2014)
- BBC Magazines (2011)
- Behavioural Insights Team (2014, 2021)
- Bio Products Laboratory (2013, 2016)
- British Waterways (2012)
- Constructionline (2015)
- Defence Support Group (2015)
- Dr Foster Intelligence (2015)
- East Coast Trains (2015)
- Eurostar International Limited (2015 – 40%)
- Fire Service College (2013)
- Food and Environment Research Agency (2015 – 75%)
- Government Pipelines and Storage System (2015)
- High Speed 1 (2010; sale of concession to operate for 30 years)
- Lloyds Banking Group (2013, 2014, 2015, 2016, 2017)
- Manchester Airports Group (2013 – 35%)
- Marchwood Military Port (2016; sale of concession to operate for 35 years)
- NEC Group (2015)
- Network Rail (2019, commercial property business)
- Northern Rock (2012)
- Northern Rock (Asset Management) (2016)
- Remploy (2012, 2013, 2015, factory businesses sold individually)
- Royal Bank of Scotland Group (2015, 2018)
- Royal Mail (2013, 2015)
- Student Loans (2017, 2018, income–contingent loans)
- The Tote (2011)
- UK Green Investment Bank (2017)
- Working Links (2016)

=== 2020s ===
- Bradford & Bingley (2021)
- NatWest Group (2021, 2022, 2023, 2024, 2025)
- NRAM Limited (2021)
- Wave Hub (2021)

Privatisations by share offer, 1981–91 From Nigel Lawson, The View from No. 11 (Bantam, 1992).
Date	Company	% of equity initially sold	Proceeds £m
Feb 1981	British Aerospace	51.6	150
Oct 1981	Cable & Wireless	50	224
Feb 1982	Amersham International	100	71
Nov 1982	Britoil	51	549
Feb 1983	Associated British Ports	51.5	22
June 1984	Enterprise Oil	100	392
July 1984	Jaguar	99	294
Nov 1984	British Telecom	50.2	3,916
Dec 1986	British Gas	97	5,434
Feb 1987	British Airways	100	900
May 1987	Rolls-Royce	100	1,363
July 1987	British Airports Authority	100	1,281
Dec 1988	British Steel	100	2,500
Dec 1989	Regional Water Companies	100	5,110
Dec 1990	Electricity Distribution Companies	100	5,092
Mar 1991	National Power and PowerGen	60	2,230
May 1991	Scottish Power and Scottish Hydro Electric	100	2,880

== United States ==
- Conrail
- Federal National Mortgage Association (Fannie Mae)
- Railway Express Agency
- Student Loan Marketing Association (SLM Corporation) (Sallie Mae)

== See also ==
- Nationalization
  - List of nationalizations by country
- Privatization
