= List of privatisations in Iceland =

This is a list of privatisations in Iceland.

== List of companies ==
Company	Date founded	Acquirer	Date privatised	% of shares	Value
Áburðarverksmiðjan hf	1952	—N/a	3 March 1999	100.00	1,257,000,000 ISK
Barri hf	—N/a	Félag skógarbænda á Héraði	January 2004	22.39	4,100,000 ISK
Bifreiðaskoðun Íslands hf	1988	Various	1997	50.00	—N/a
Búnaðarbanki Íslands hf	1929	—N/a	1999	13.00	—N/a
Búnaðarbanki Íslands hf	1929	—N/a	2003	45.80	—N/a
Búnaðarbanki Íslands hf	1929	—N/a	2003	9.11	—N/a
Ferðaskrifstofa Íslands	1936	Employees	1988	2/3	14,000,000 ISK
Ferðaskrifstofa Íslands	1936	Employees	18 August 1992	1/3	18,700,000 ISK
Fjárfestingarbanki atvinnulífsins hf	1997	Various	1998	49.00	—N/a
Fjárfestingarbanki atvinnulífsins hf	1997	—N/a	1999	51.00	—N/a
Flugskóli Íslands hf	1998	—N/a	2005	21.90	—N/a
Gutenberg	1904	Steindórsprent	29 June 1992	100.00	84,900,000 ISK
Hólalax hf	1979	Employees, Fiskiðjan Skagfirðingur hf	1999	33.00	9,000,000 ISK
Intís	1995	Íslandssími	2000	22.00	64,000,000 ISK
Íslensk endurtrygging hf	1939	—N/a	1992	36.50	162,000,000 ISK
Íslenska járnblendifélagið hf	28 April 1975	—N/a	1998	26.50	—N/a
Íslenska járnblendifélagið hf	28 April 1975	—N/a	2002	10.49	—N/a
Íslenska menntanetið	1992	Skýrr hf	1999	100.00	—N/a
Íslenskir aðalverktakar hf	1954	—N/a	1998	10.70	—N/a
Íslenskir aðalverktakar hf	1954	—N/a	2003	39.86	—N/a
Jarðboranir hf	18 April 1945	Various	1992–1995	50.00	—N/a
Kísiliðjan hf	1968	Allied Efa hf	February 2001	51.00	62,000,000 ISK
Landsbanki Íslands hf	1885	Various	1999	13.00	—N/a
Landsbanki Íslands hf	1885	Various	2002	20.00	—N/a
Landsbanki Íslands hf	1885	Samson eignarhaldsfélag ehf	2002	45.80	—N/a
Landsbanki Íslands hf	1885	Various	2003	2.50	—N/a
Landssími Íslands	1906	Various	2001	2.69	1,087,000,000 ISK
Landssími Íslands	1906	Skipti ehf	2005	98.80	—N/a
Lyfjaverslun Íslands hf	1986	Various	1994–1995	100.00	—N/a
Rýni hf	—N/a	Nýja skoðunarstofan hf	1993	100.00	4,000,000 ISK
Sementsverksmiðjan	1956	Íslenskt sement ehf	2003	100.00	68,000,000 ISK
Skýrr hf	1953	—N/a	1997	28.00	—N/a
Skýrr hf	1953	—N/a	1998	22.00	—N/a
SR-mjöl hf,Siglufirði	19 July 1930	Various	1993	100.00	725,000,000 ISK
Sementsverksmiðjan hf	1985	—N/a	1993	100.00	—N/a
Stofnfiskur hf	6 March 1991	—N/a	1999	19.00	—N/a
Stofnfiskur hf	6 March 1991	—N/a	2001	33.00	—N/a
Þormóður rammi hf	—N/a	—N/a	1994	16.60	—N/a
Þróunarfélag Íslands hf	1984	12 pension funds	1992	29.00	130,000,000 ISK
Þörungaverksmiðjan hf	1986	Kelco	1995	67.00	16,500,000 ISK

== List of assets ==
Entity	Asset	Acquirer	Date privatised	Value
Lánasjóður landbúnaðarins	Loan portfolio	—N/a	2005	—N/a
Menningarsjóður	Unsold books and publishing rights	Mál og menning hf, various	1992	—N/a
National Centre for Educational Materials	Educational materials store	GKS hf	1999	36,800,000 ISK
State Alcohol and Tobacco Company	Production department	—N/a	29 June 1992	15,000,000 ISK
State Shipping Company	Ships	—N/a	1992	350,400,000 ISK

== See also ==
- List of privatizations
