= Blossa =

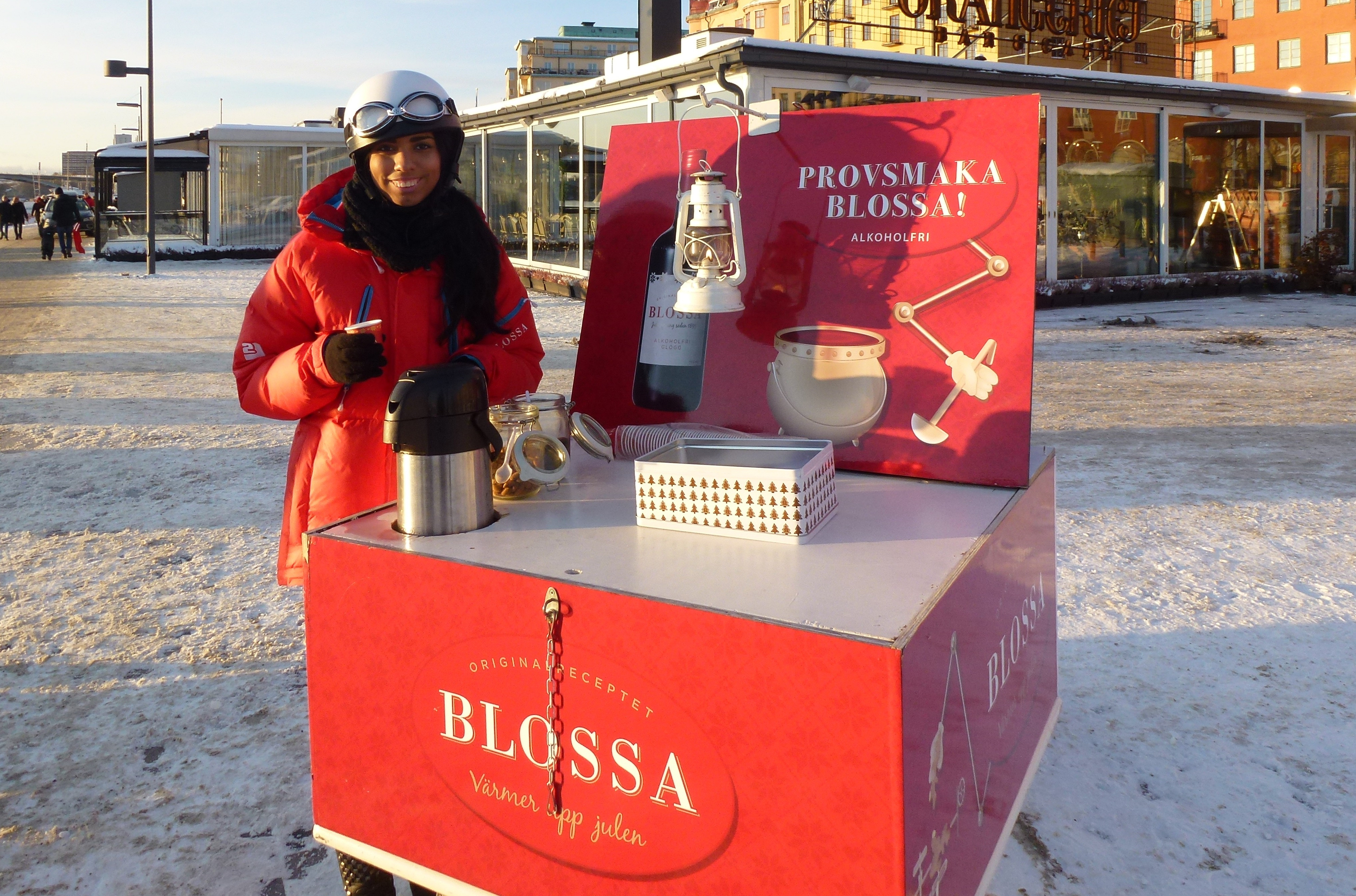
Tasting of alcohol-free Blossa at Norr Mälarstrand in 2012.

Blossa is a trademark for glögg owned by Anora Group (and previously by Altia and before that Vin & Sprit) which is the most sold glögg in Sweden. There are 11 kinds of glögg in the selection, and also an annual seasonal glögg since 2003. In the early 1950s Vin & Spirit produced 750 thousand litres of glögg per year and in 2009 the company sold 4.1 million litres per year.

== History ==
Johan Daniel Grönstedt founded the wine retail company J.D. Grönstedt & Co in Stockholm in the middle 19th century until viticulture was made public in the early 20th century. The company's wine glöggs included many different wines flavoured with syrup, raisins, sweet almonds, cinnamon, cardamomum, dianthus and occasionally vanilla. The wines were made into glögg in the company's warehouse in the Gamla Stan. When the Vin- & Spritcentralen came about in 1917 a new wine warehouse was opened on Sankt Eriksgatan. Grönstedts worked here as a daughter company of Vin- & Spritcentralen in the 1920s.

At Christmas time in 1994 the trademark became known for the TV advertisement "Glöggen heter Blossa" starring a group of Christmas elves. Similar advertisements were shown at Christmas time in 2007 and 2016.

== Production ==
Blossa is produced by an original recipe from Grönstedts Vinhandel from the late 19th century. Until 2008 Blossa was produced by Vin- & Spritcentralen in Sundsvall. The spices are stored and prepared in a factory in Åhus where spiced glögg is produced by soaking the spices in alcohol over a month's time. The resulting mix is then sent to the factory in Sundsvall where the glögg is produced, by mixing the wine, syrup and spiced alcohol together. After the glögg has been cleared and filtered it is ready for bottling.

On 18 June 2008 the Swedish Vin- & Spritcentralen stopped producing the glögg as its new owner Pernod Ricard closed down the factory in Sundsvall. After this, production moved to Svendborg in Denmark. In 2010 Blossa and many other Vin- & Spritcentralen trademarks were sold to the Finnish company Altia which in 2021 merged with Arcus to form Anora Group.

== Products ==
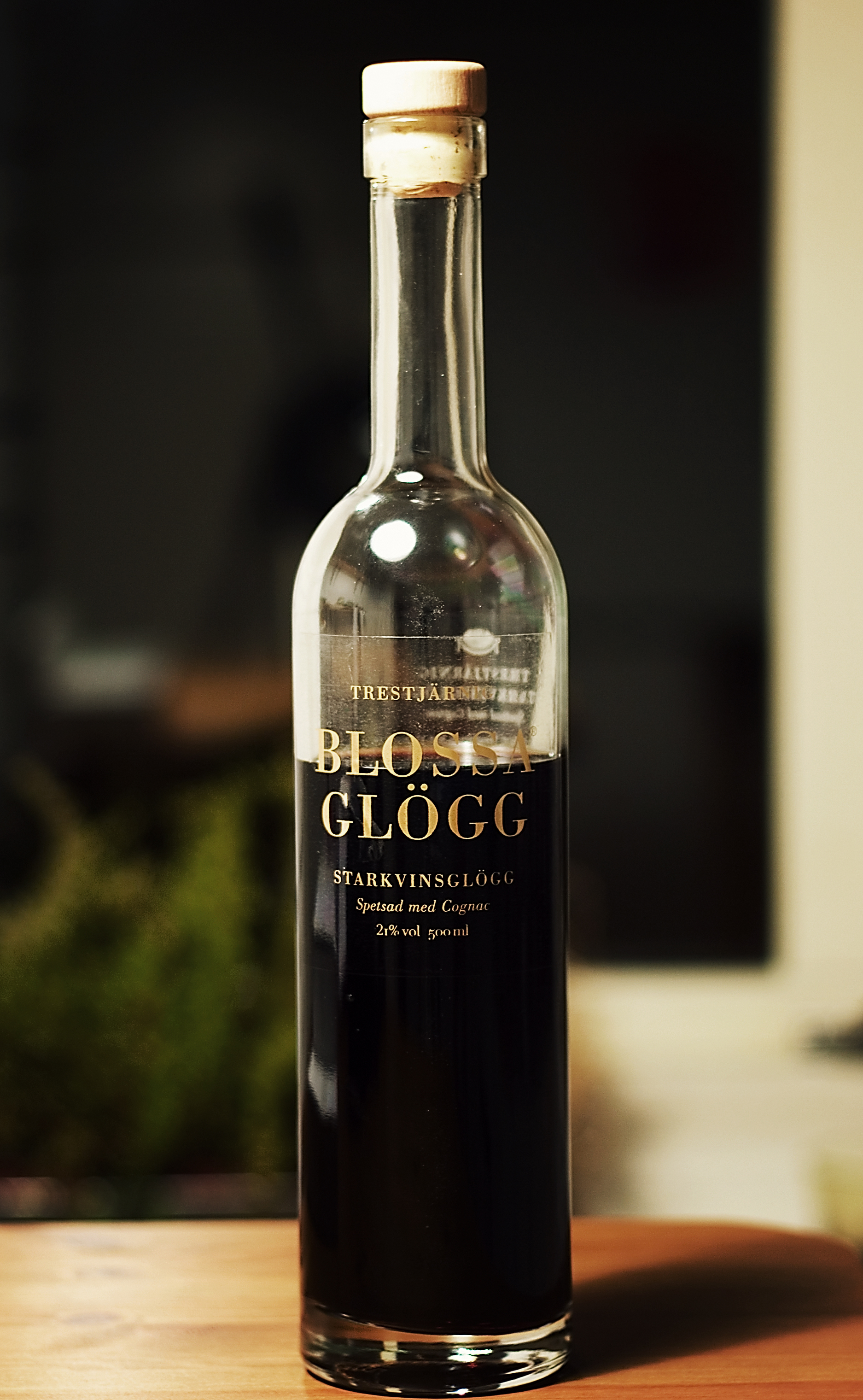
Blossa strong wine glögg with Cognac.

- White strong wine glögg
- Red strong wine glögg
- White mild glögg
- Red mild glögg
- Wine glögg
- Strong wine glögg *** Cognac
- Strong wine glögg *** Rum
- Mild glögg with lingonberry
- Mild glögg with orange
- Mild glögg with apple
- Alcohol-free glögg
- Sparkling & Spices (sparkling wine with glögg spices)

== Annual seasonal glögg ==
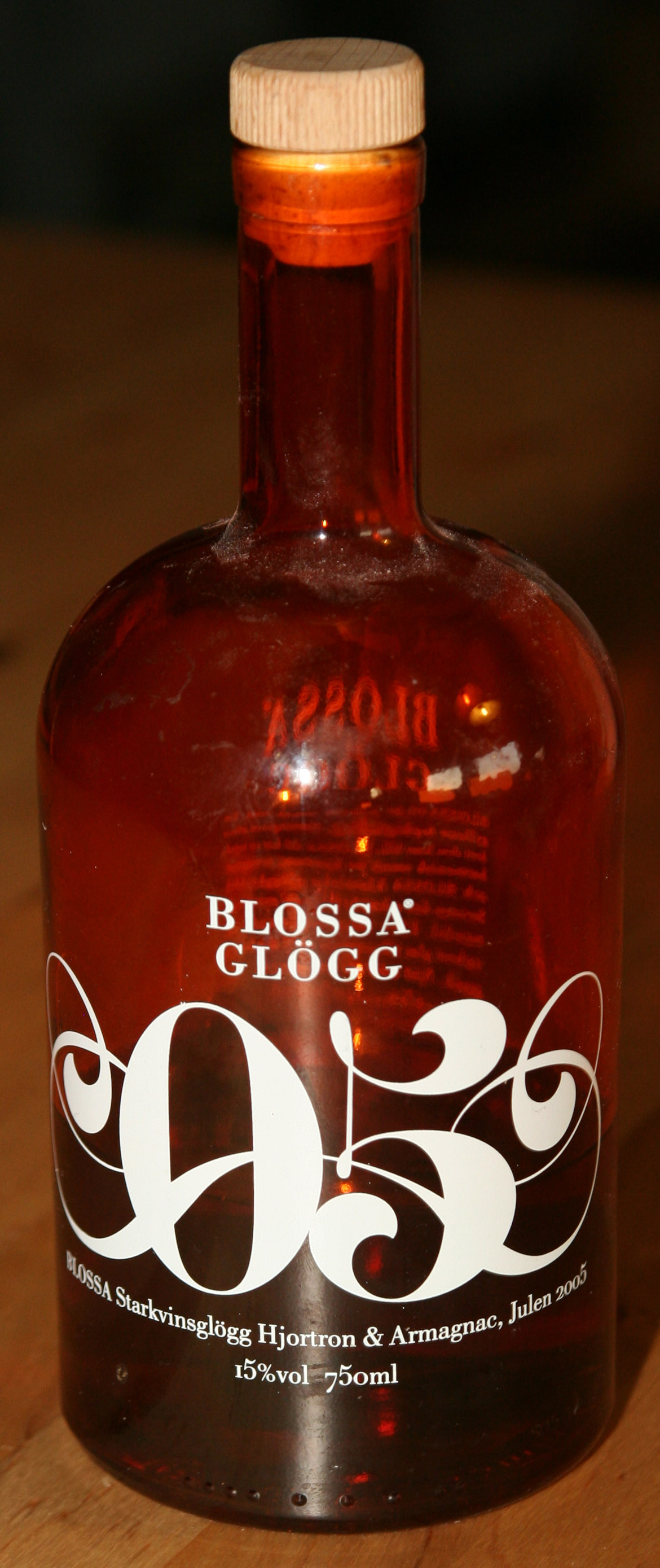
Blossa seasonal glögg from 2005.

Since 2003 Blossa has been producing annual seasonal glöggs. Since 2016 the selection has also included an alcohol-free version called Blossa Hantverksglögg.

- 2003 bitter orange
- 2004 winter apple
- 2005 cloudberry & Armagnac
- 2006 lingonberry & juniper berry
- 2007 sea buckthorn & cinnamon
- 2008 blueberry
- 2009 clementine
- 2010 saffron
- 2011 Arabica
- 2012 yuzu & ginger
- 2013 Dalecarlia (rose hip and raspberry)
- 2014 lavender
- 2015 Earl Grey tea
- 2016 crowberry
- 2017 Old Delhi (mango, cumin and chili)
- 2018 di Limone (Limoncello, rosemary, thyme and basil)
- 2019 Aloha (passionfruit, hibiscus)
- 2020 Myntate (green tea and mint)
- 2021 Valencia (orange)

=== Alcohol-free glögg ===
- 2016 blueberry & ginger
- 2017 lingonberry & juniper berry
- 2018 blackcurrant & star anise
- 2019 apple & vanilla
