= Danish Distillers =

Danish spirits manufacturer

Coordinates: 57.054011°N 9.910914°E

Det Danske Spiritus Kompagni A/S
- Trade name: De Danske Spritfabrikker
- Company type: Subsidiary
- Industry: Distilled beverages
- Predecessor: Aalborg Privilegerede Spritfabrik
- Founded: 1881; 144 years ago in Aalborg, Denmark
- Founder: C. F. Tietgen
- Fate: Acquired
- Headquarters: Copenhagen, Denmark
- Key people: Christian Alsing (director)
- Products: Akvavit, bitters
- Parent: Anora Group
- Website: www.ddskas.dk (administrative); www.aalborgakvavit.dk (sales)

Danish Distillers (Danish: Det Danske Spiritus Kompagni known as Danish: De Danske Spritfabrikker) is a company that was headquartered in Aalborg, Denmark. Isidor Henius, the father of Max Henius, was one of the founders of a company that was acquired by Danish Distillers, which ended up owning all Danish spirits production. It has been owned by the Norwegian-based Arcus Group since 2013. To avoid a dominant position in the Danish market, Arcus had to divest the brand Brøndums Snaps (akvavit). This brand was sold to Finland's Altia group spirits producer. The brands were not reunited in 2021 when Arcus and Altia merged to form Anora Group as Altia sold Brøndums to Galatea ahead of the merger.

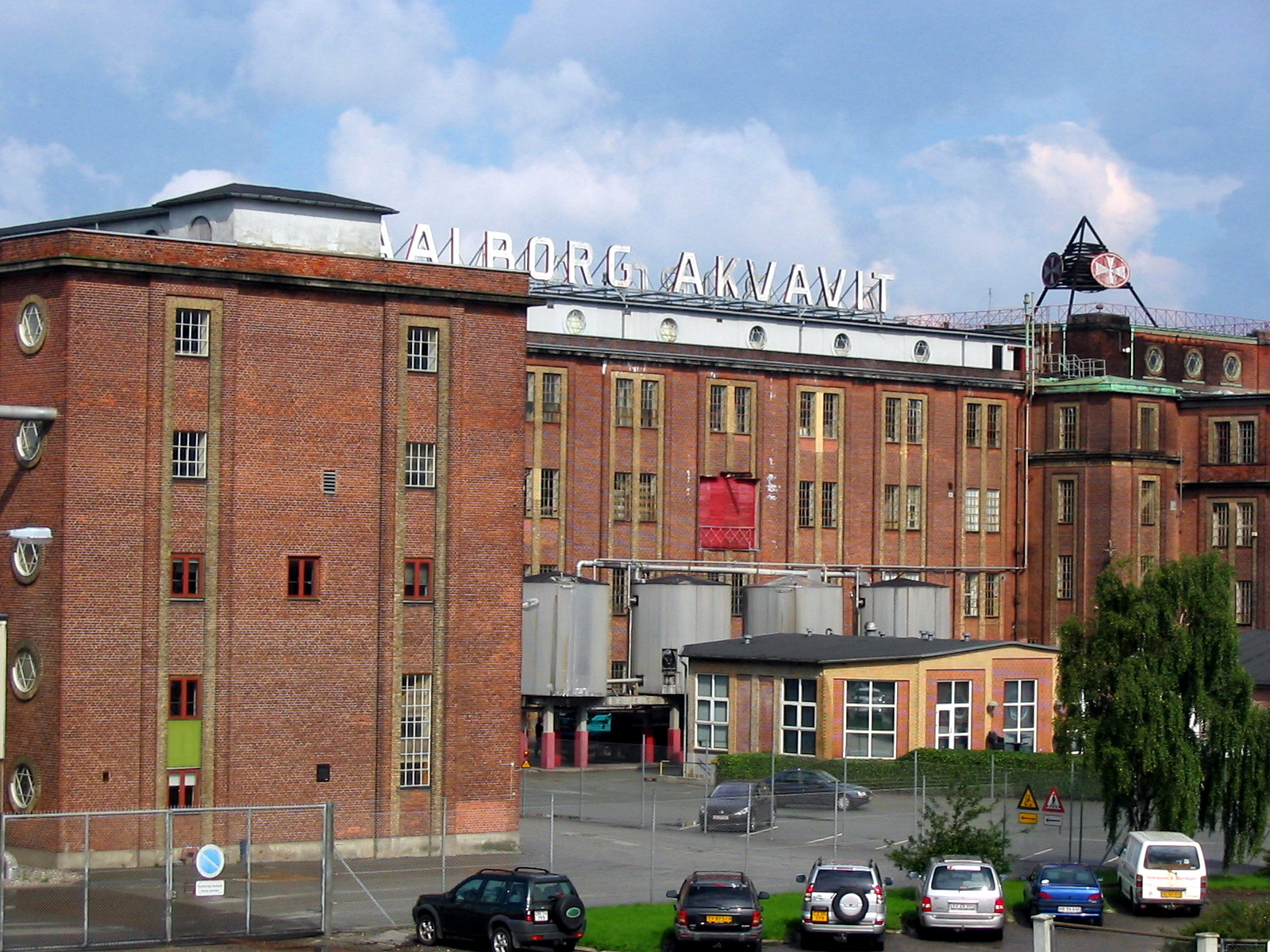
The landmark factory in Aalborg seen in 2006

The company is known for its Aalborg akvavits and Gammel Dansk bitter. It was established in 1881 by C. F. Tietgen. The factory is located west of the Limfjord Bridge. Completed in 1931, it was designed in Neoclassical style by the architect Alf Cock-Clausen. It is now a Danish National Heritage site. The factory in Aalborg closed in April 2015 when production was moved to Norway.
