= Skåne Akvavit =

Swedish akvavit

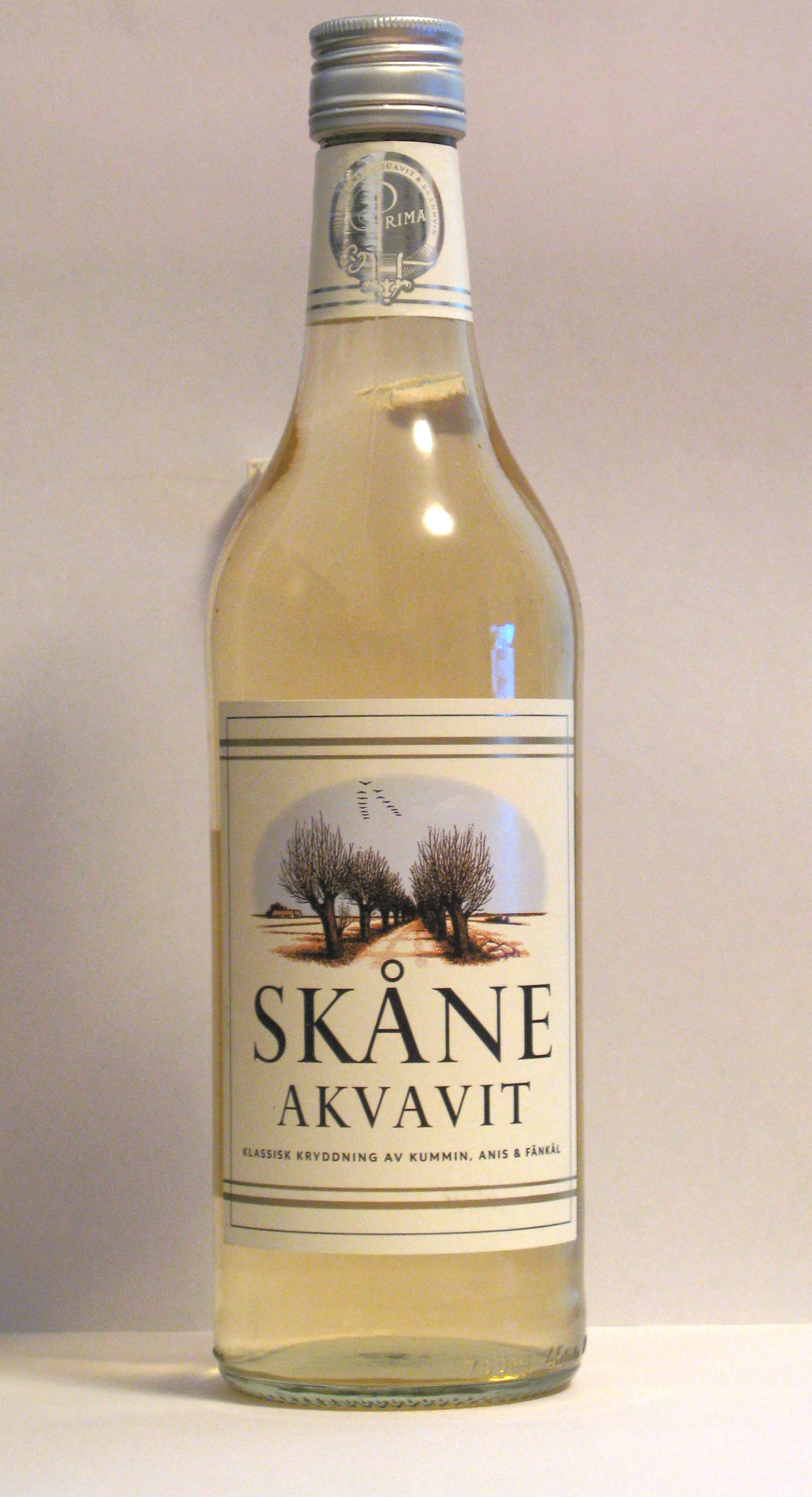
A bottle of Skåne Akvavit

Skåne Akvavit is a Swedish spiced spirit brand of the akvavit type. It is named for the province of Scania, which is called Skåne in Swedish.

Skåne Akvavit was first presented in 1931 as a less spiced version of O.P. Anderson. Skåne Akvavit is spiced with caraway, anise and fennel.

Skåne Akvavit is produced at the V&S Vin & Sprit AB distillery in Sundsvall, Västernorrland County, Sweden. Vin & Sprit used to be state-owned, but was sold to French company Pernod Ricard to create more competition on the Swedish market. Skåne Akvavit was in turn sold to Altia which was owned by the Finnish State.

Altia sold Skåne Akvavit to Galatea Spirits in 2021 in order to merge with Arcus to form Anora Group.
