= Magyar Fehér Bor =

Hungarian wine

Magyar Fehér Bor (literally Hungarian white wine) is a Hungarian medium sweet white wine that Alko, a state-owned Finnish alcoholic beverage retailing monopoly, has bottled and sold since 1935. Since 1999, the bottling is done by Altia. "Magyar Fehér Bor" is a Finnish brand name and has many nicknames of which "Magis" or "Makkis" are the most used.
