= Pierre Desprairies =

French government official (1921–2019)

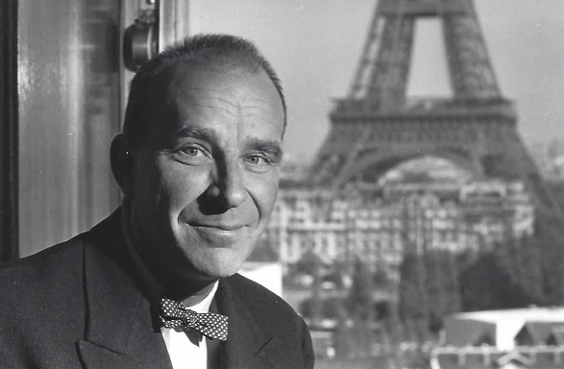
- Pierre Desprairies in 1967
- Born: 10 June 1921; Bayeux, France
- Died: 9 December 2019 (aged 98)
- Occupation: Government official

Pierre Desprairies (10 June 1921 – 9 December 2019) was a French senior government official.

== Biography ==
A former student at the École Nationale d'Administration, he joined the Court of Audit in 1948 upon his completion of school.

He was on the cabinet of Pierre Guillaumat from 1958 to 1959, and President of the Société des pétroles d'Afrique equatoriale from 1959 to 1966. Additionally, he served as CEO of Sofiran from 1967 to 1974, director general of Union Générale des Pétroles from 1960 to 1964, director of external relations for ERAP from 1966 to 1974, which would become Elf Aquitaine, and the president of the board of directors of the French Institute of Petroleum from 1974 to 1986.

In 2000, Desprairies was interviewed as a former director of external relations at Elf Aquitane for the documentary Elf: une Afrique sous influence, directed by Fabrizio Calvi, Jean-Michel Meurice and Laurence Dequay.

He was decorated with a Croix de Guerre 1939–1945 and was a member of the Legion of Honour, as well as president of the alumni association for the École nationale d'administration. He was a founding member of the French Academy of Technologies.

== Books ==
- Les Ressources de pétrole – Les limites de l'approvisionnement pétrolier mondial (1978)
- La Crise de l'énergie - Le mal, le remède (1982)
