= Anora Group =

Multinational alcoholic beverage company

Anora Group Plc
- Company type: Public company
- Traded as: Nasdaq Helsinki: ANORA
- ISIN: FI4000292438
- Industry: Distilled beverages Wine
- Predecessors: Altia Group and Arcus Group
- Founded: September 21, 2021; 3 years ago in Helsinki, Finland
- Headquarters: Helsinki, Finland
- Areas served: Europe, Asia and North America
- Key people: Pekka Tennilä (CEO); Sigmund Toth (CFO); Michael Holm Johansen (chairman); Sanna Suvanto-Harsaae (vice chairman)
- Revenue: €342.4M (2020)
- Number of employees: 1100 (2021)
- Website: anora.com

Anora Group Plc (Finnish: Anora Group Oyj) is a Nordic distilled beverage and wine company. It was formed in 2021 as a result of the merger of Norway's Arcus Group and Finland's Altia Group. Headquartered in Helsinki, Finland, Anora has offices in each of the Nordic capital cities.

Anora's four business areas are: wine, spirits, international and industrial alcohol products (its Anora Industrial unit produces barley-based refined goods for industrial use).

== History ==
The intention to form Anora Group was announced on 29 September 2020. As regulators in Finland, Norway and Sweden reviewed the proposal, they decided several brands would have to be divested to avoid unfair market dominance by the new company. As such, Altia sold Skåne Akvavit, Hallands Fläder, Brøndum and Grönstedts. Arcus unloaded Akevitt Spesial, SPRT and Dworek. All seven brands were purchased by Sweden-based Galatea Spirits, traditionally a wholesaler and distributor throughout Scandinavia. The merger received government approval and was finalized on 1 September 2021.

Anora Group was initially listed for trading on both the Nasdaq Helsinki and Oslo Stock Exchange but by December 2021 it had already requested and received approval to be delisted in Oslo by the end of the year.

Anora's deeper history, through its predecessors Altia and Arcus, can be traced back to some of the oldest Nordic spirits brands through a long series of mergers and acquisitions:

=== Denmark ===
In 1846, Isidor Henius founded a distillery in Aalborg, but it was not the only one in the city. In 1872, Aalborg Privilegerede Spritfabrik became a company by uniting several small distilleries. De Danske Spritfabrikker was established by Carl Frederik Tietgen who turned it into a publicly traded company in 1881, which by 1923 owned all Danish distilleries. In the face of the temperance movement, the company was granted a government-sanctioned monopoly on all production which lasted until 1973. In 2008, Pernod Ricard bought the Danish company and its brands. Arcus bought them from Pernod in 2013. By 2015 production was moved to Norway.

=== Finland ===
In 1888, a yeast plant and distillery were established in Rajamäki. After Prohibition in Finland started in 1919, the state acquired it to produce medicinal alcohol as a public utility under the name Valtion Alkoholiliike. When prohibition was abolished in 1932, the state established Oy Alkoholiliike Ab to produce and sell legalized alcoholic beverages as a state-owned alcohol monopoly of both production and sales. The name was later changed to Alko. In 1999, production was spun off into Altia which was partially privatized, while Alko continues to this day as the sole retailer middleman in Finland for beverages with an ABV above 8%. In the 2000s, Altia acquired a number of brands of cognac and other distilled spirits in Denmark, Sweden, Latvia, Estonia and France.

=== Norway ===
In 1821, Jørgen Bernhoft Lysholm began distilling spirits at his Lysholm factory in Trondheim, including the popular Linie Akvavit. In 1855, competitor Løiten Distillery was established in Oslo. In 1919, Norway introduced prohibition on spirits. During prohibition, the government established Vinmonopolet (literally Wine Monopoly) as the sole producer, importer and retailer of alcohol. After prohibition on spirits was lifted, Vinmonopolet also got into production of spirits and revived the Linie and Løiten brands. In 1996, the government privatized production by creating the publicly traded Arcus Group after a judgement by EFTA. Vinmonopolet still handles retail. Since then, other historic brands have also been revived by Arcus.

=== Sweden ===
In 1891, O.P. Anderson & Son i Göteborg started to produce O.P. Anderson Aquavit based in Gothenburg. When Sweden introduced the Bratt System instead of total prohibition, it became part of state-owned Vin & Sprit in 1917. Skåne Akvavit was introduced in 1931. V&S was sold to Pernod Ricard in 2008. In 2010 both brands were acquired by Altia.

== Anora Industrial ==
Anora Industrial is a business area and a unit of Anora Group Plc, which produces barley-based refined goods for industrial use. Anora Group Plc was formed in 2021 as a result of a merger between Norwegian Arcus and Finnish Altia.

Anora Industrial operates in the Nordic countries. It consists of the operations of a starch plant and distillery in Koskenkorva, Finland, and the operations of an ethanol plant in Rajamäki, Finland, focusing on technical products and the sale of contract manufacturing services to alcoholic beverage customers.

The main products of Anora Industrial are technical ethanol, barley starch and heat transfer fluids. Anora Industrial manufactures and sells clean and denatured ethanol products for corporate customers. Finnish alcohol legislation defines the use of technical ethanols and the denaturing of ethanols.

In addition to barley-based grain spirit, which is produced for Anora's own use, the Koskenkorva plant produces other varieties of ethanol, feed raw materials, and barley starch for various purposes. Starch can be used, for example, as raw material in the pulp and paper industries and in the food industry. The barley starch used in the Finnish paper and paper board production is sold by Chemigate. Barley starch is also produced gluten-free.

The Rajamäki ethanol plant produces geothermal fluids that enable the transfer of natural heat from soil, water bodies, and rocks into heating energy for buildings. Natural heat transfer fluid, manufactured at the Rajamäki plant, is a Finnish market leader in ethanol-based heat transfer fluids.

== Key brands ==
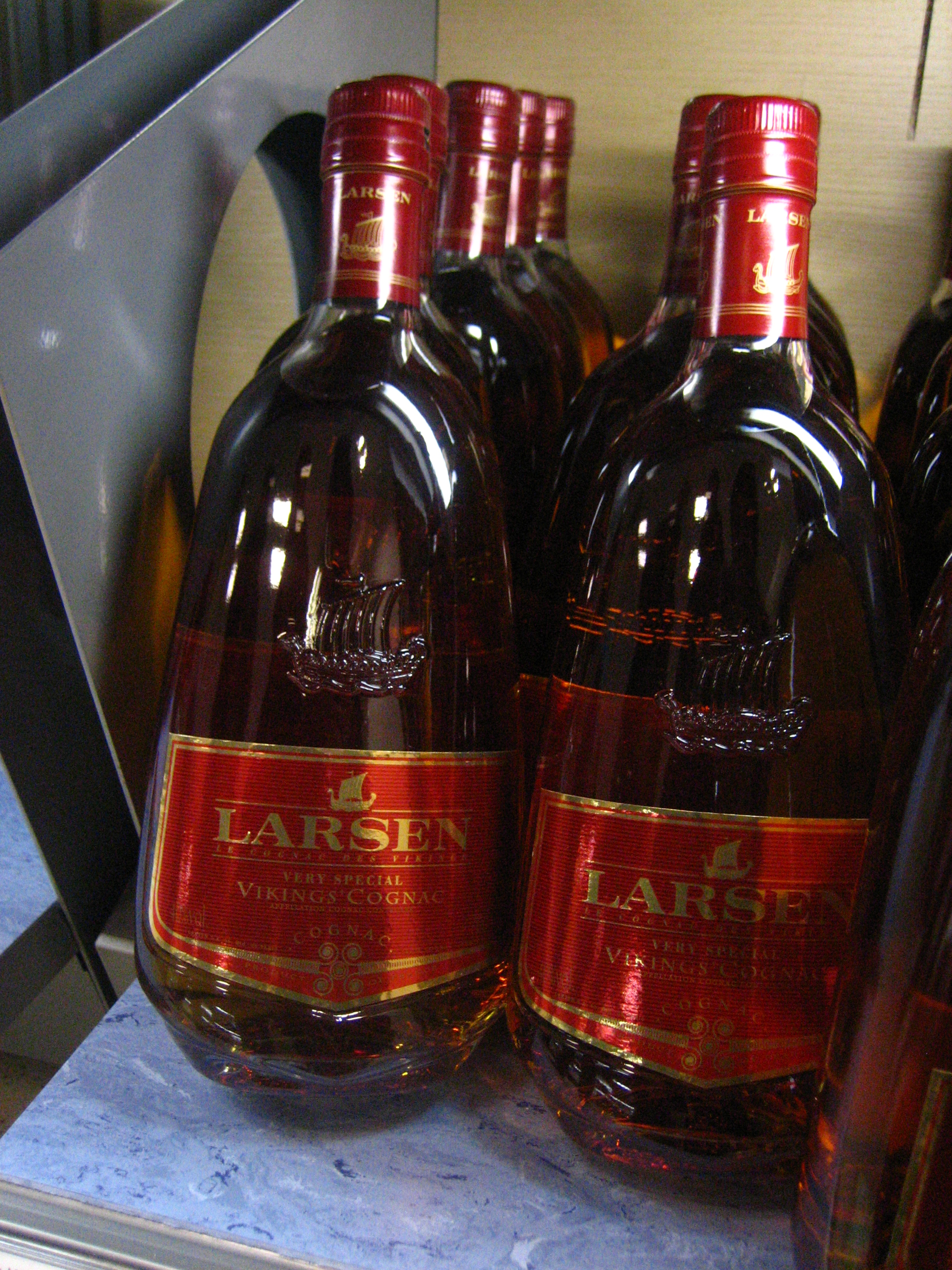
Bottles of Larsen Cognac

Anora Group produces scores of differently branded alcoholic beverages and in 2021 began producing flavored seltzers and non-alcoholic spirits. The company says its key brands are:

- Blossa (glögg)
- Chill Out (wine)
- Falling Feather (wine)
- Koskenkorva (viina and vodka)
- Larsen (cognac)
- Linie Aquavit (akvavit)
- O. P. Anderson (akvavit)
- Ruby Zin (wine)
- Skagerrak (gin)
- Wongraven (wine)
