= Gammel Dansk =

Danish herbal bitters liquor

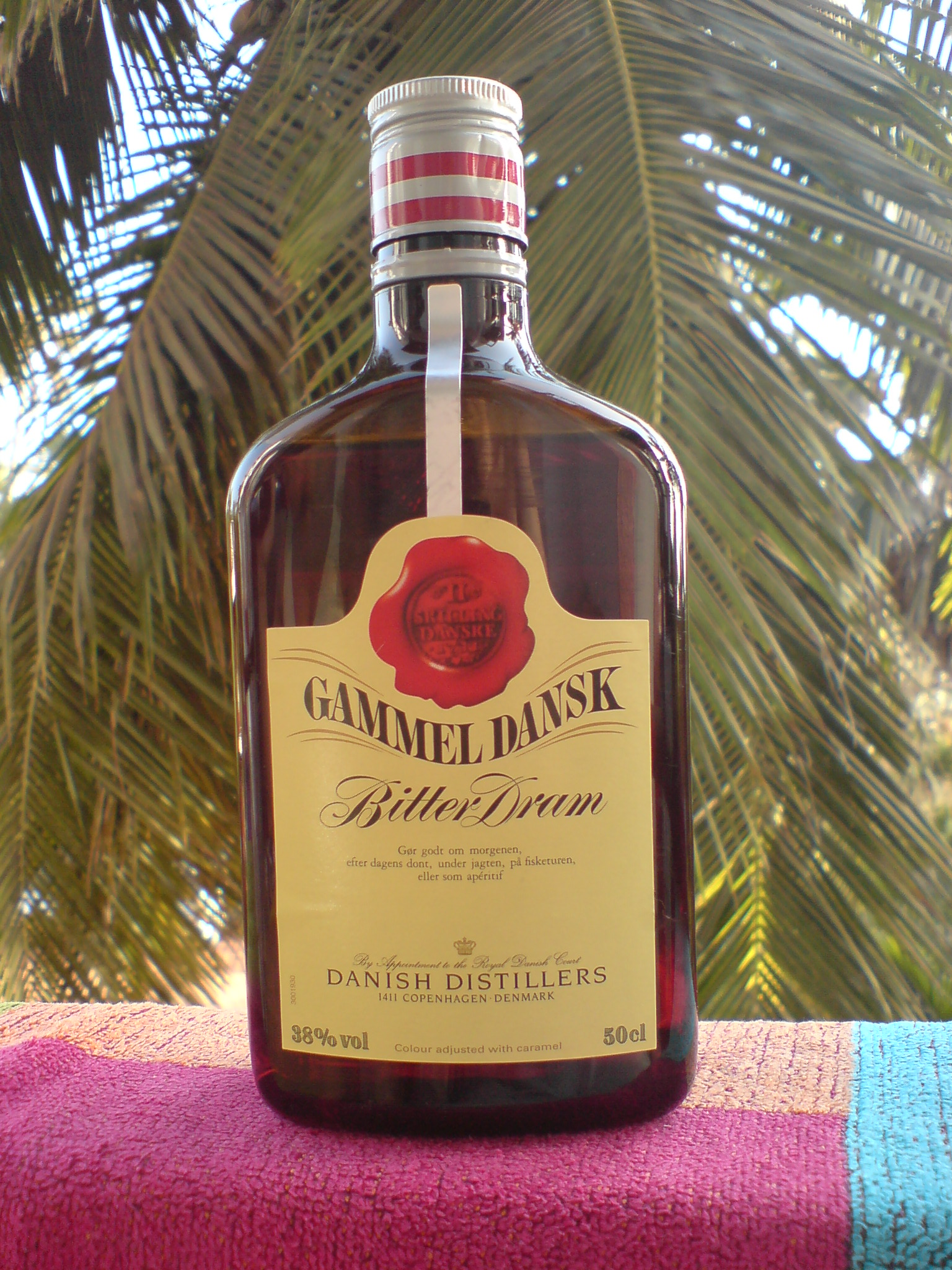
Gammel Dansk

Gammel Dansk is a bitters (herbal alcoholic preparation) produced by Arcus-Gruppen in Oslo, Norway, originally developed and produced by Danish Distillers in Denmark. Traditionally it is drunk by Danes at certain festive occasions, often in connection with breakfast meals, brunch or at wedding anniversaries and birthday celebrations (which in Denmark traditionally begin in the morning). The name "Gammel Dansk" translates directly from Danish as "Old Danish".

== Description ==
Gammel Dansk is a bitters liquor and was originally created to become a competitor on the Danish market to other bitters such as Underberg and Fernet Branca. It is matured with 29 types of herbs, spices and even flowers, making it similar to other stomach bitters, such as Peychaud's Bitters or Jägermeister. These herbs and spices include rowan berry, angelica, star anise, nutmeg, anise, ginger, laurel, yellow gentian, Seville orange and cinnamon. The complete recipe is kept secret.

== History ==
The development of Gammel Dansk commenced in 1964 and was led by master blender J.K. Asmund who also worked as factory manager for Danish Distillers in Roskilde. Three years later the production of the bitter started, and it has since become one of the most recognizable strong alcoholic beverages on the Danish market.

In the Denmark of the 1960s and 1970s, the drinking of bitters, such as Gammel Dansk, was not considered taboo in the morning. The bottle even reads Gør godt om morgenen, efter dagens dont, under jagten, på fisketuren eller som apéritif. ("Will do you good in the morning, after a day's work, when hunting or fishing, or as an apéritif.") With the 1980s came a greater concern for public health, and with that bitters fell out of favor compared to the lower ABV beer and wine. Even so, Gammel Dansk still constitutes two-thirds of all bitters sold in Denmark.

In 2007 Danish Distillers launched a new product which, as a tribute to J.K. Asmund, was labeled Asmund Special.

On 14 March 2014, Arcus, the owners of the Gammel Dansk brand, announced that production would move to Norway.

In 2014, Arcus launched Gammel Dansk Shot, a variation over the traditional recipe, flavored with liquorice and chili. It is intended to be drunk as a shooter.

In 2019 they launched a less bitter version called "Gammel Dansk Halv bitter", meaning "Half the bitterness" aiming at younger customers. This version is advertised as being more sweet, less bitter and having a higher content of honey and licorice

== See also ==
- Arnbitter
