= Sucra =

Defunct Norwegian holding company

Sucra AS
- Industry: Holding company
- Founded: 2001
- Defunct: 2005
- Fate: Sold
- Successor: Ratos
- Headquarters: Oslo, Norway

Sucra was a Norwegian holding company that was created in 2001 to own the alcoholic beverage producer and importer Arcus after it had been privatized. Sucra's main owners were Tine, Gilde, Norske Potetindustrier and Ekjord. Sucra bought 66% of Arcus in 2001 and the rest of the company in 2003. In 2005, Sucra and Arcus were sold to the Swedish investment company Ratos.
