= Alko =

Alcoholic beverage retailing monopoly

Alko Inc
- Native name: Alko Oy
- Type: Government enterprise (incorporated as osakeyhtiö)
- Industry: Alcoholic beverages
- Founded: 1932; 94 years ago
- Headquarters: Helsinki, Finland
- Key people: Leena Laitinen (CEO)
- Products: Alcoholic beverages
- Revenue: €1,028.6 million (2025)
- Number of employees: 2,118 (2025)
- Website: www.alko.fi

Alko Inc is the national alcoholic beverage retailing monopoly in Finland. It is the only store in the country which retails beer over 8% ABV, wine (except in vineyards) and spirits. Alcoholic beverages are also sold in licensed restaurants and bars but only for consumption on the premises.

Alko is required by law to sell drinks with lower alcohol content than 8% and non-alcoholic alternatives, but in practice carries a very limited stock of low alcohol beer, cider and non-alcoholic drinks and others as supermarkets are allowed to sell those at a substantially lower price. By law, alcoholic drinks may only be sold to those aged 18 or above.

== Products ==
As the only retailer of strong alcoholic beverages in Finland, Alko has an extensive range of products ranging from rare wines to bulk vodka. Its wine selection has grown in recent decades as there has been an increase in consumption and a government drive to change Finnish drinking habits to a more "European" style, which means a move from hard liquor to wine and beer. While wine consumption has increased, this has not replaced consumption of other alcoholic beverages, negating the "Europeanisation" argument. Nowadays wines occupy most of the shelf space in an Alko shop. Its beer selection is concentrated on stronger versions of the domestic bulk lagers and some high-quality strong beers from major beer-producing countries as well as traditional Sahti at some locations. Hard spirits include several Finnish brands of vodka and all major types of hard liquor. Alko also sells brands of drinks produced by the Finnish state-owned company Altia, which are traditional products and not sold abroad. Many of these date back to the first products launched after the end of prohibition in Finland. These are usually for mixing drinks.

In 2024, the strongest liquor sold by Alko is a tar liquor called 762 Tumma, which, as the name suggests, has an alcohol content of 76.2%.

== Legal status ==
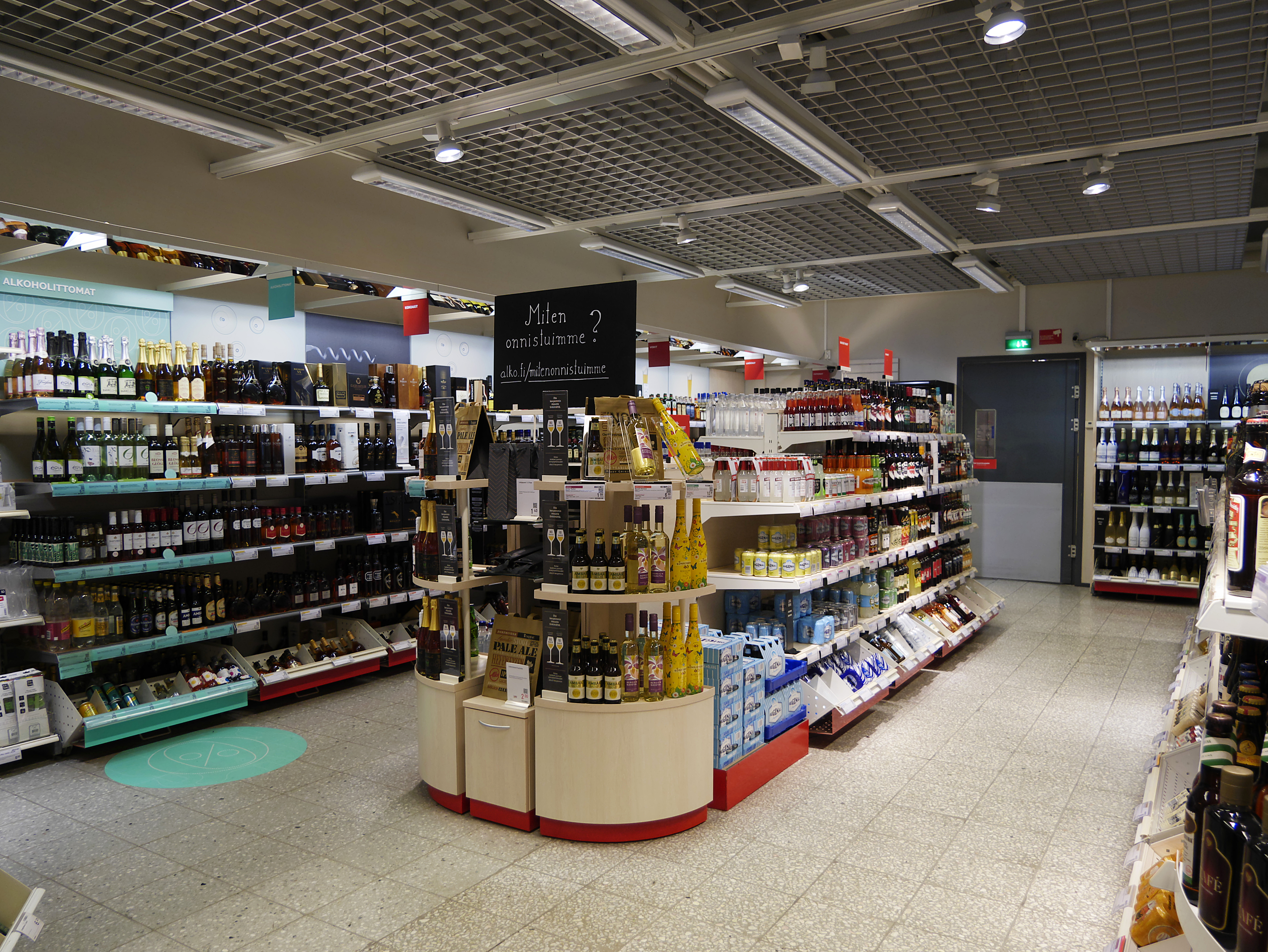
A photo from inside the Alko in Lappajärvi

Alko is a government-owned enterprise reporting to the Finnish Ministry of Health and Social Affairs. As of December 2025, it has 360 stores and over 100 order pick-up points throughout the country. Alko shop locations have to be approved by National Supervisory Authority for Welfare and Health (Finnish abbreviation Valvira). Only once has an application for a new Alko shop been denied: in 2003, an application for a location in Koivukylä, Vantaa, was rebuffed because there was a kindergarten next to the planned location. Earlier shops were located separately from other retail outlets, but beginning in the 1990s, a growing number of Alkos have appeared in malls and supermarkets, some even in gas stations. Under the Alcohol Act, Alkos cannot have a window display, so stores often have a display of wine glasses and catalogues.

Alko can advertise beverages that contain up to 22% alcohol. In practice, manufacturers or distributors, not Alko, advertise their products. There is a total ban on advertising beverages stronger than 22%.

On 3 February 2005, the Finnish Food Marketing Association (a pressure group of the country's supermarkets like K-Kauppa and S-Group) asked the European Union to challenge the legality of Alko's monopoly, which it disputes.

Products under 22% ABV can be purchased by individuals at least 18 years of age. The minimum age for products containing over 22% ABV is 20. When asked at checkout a customer must prove their age with an official ID (only a driver's licence, ID card or passport is accepted). Alcohol will not be sold to visibly intoxicated customers or when there is a reason to suspect misuse or illegal supply to a person who would not be authorized to buy.

== History ==
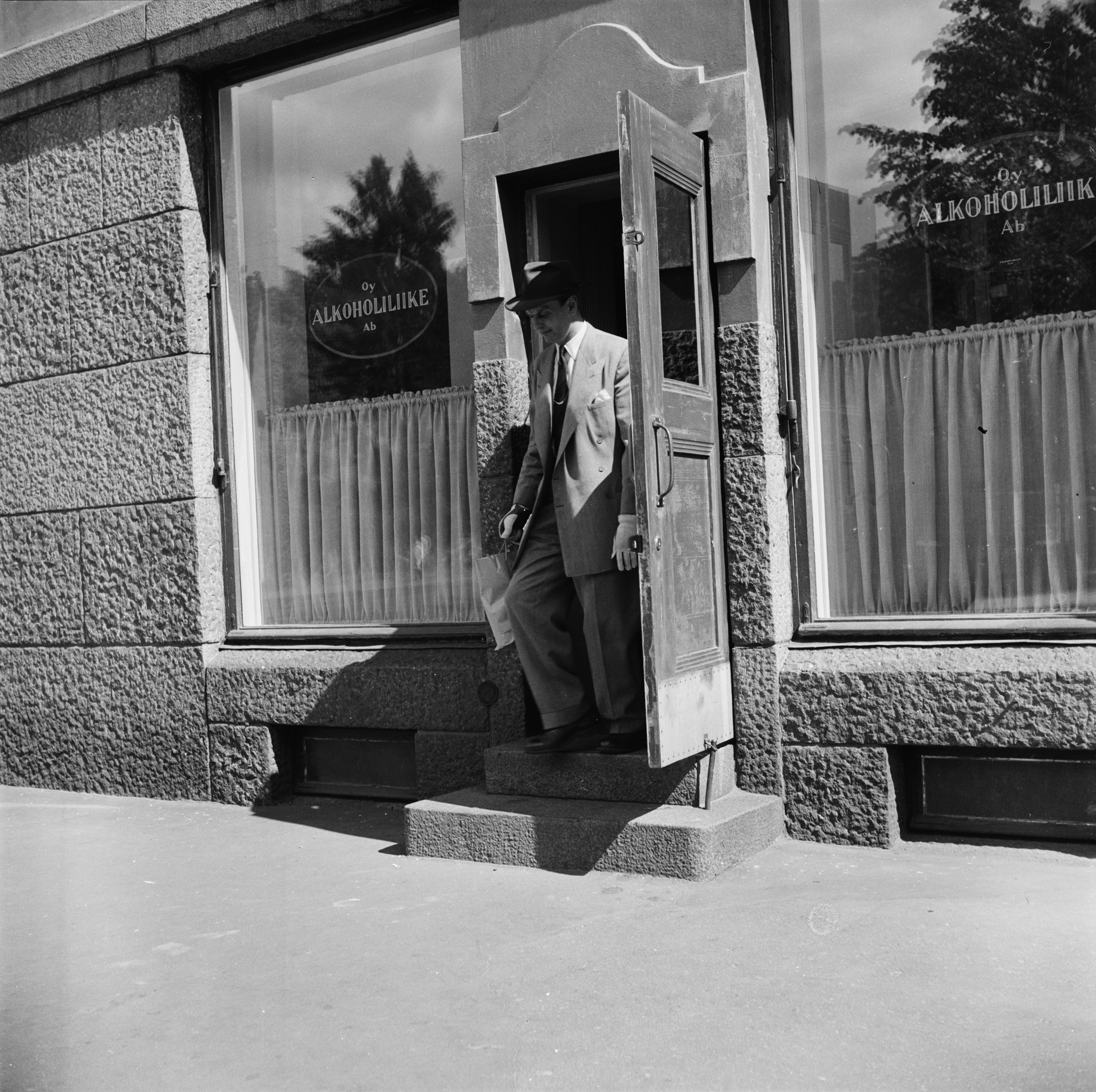
Alkoholiliike store in Helsinki in 1952

From 1919 to 1932, the distribution and consumption of alcoholic beverages was forbidden in Finland. When the prohibition was lifted by the Finnish government in 1932 following a referendum, they created a company called Oy Alkoholiliike Ab which was fully owned by the government.

The first stores were opened on 5 April 1932.

During the 1939–1940 Winter War, the company mass-produced molotov cocktails for the Finnish military, production totalling 450,000 units.

Between 1944 and 1970, Alko used the Bratt System from Sweden to control alcohol consumption, using a booklet called viinakortti whereby all alcohol sales were recorded and stamped into said booklet. Once a certain amount of alcohol was purchased, the owner of said booklet had to wait until next month to buy more.

In 1969, the company's name was changed to Oy Alko Ab. This company not only distributed, but also imported and manufactured alcohol.

Between 1962 and 1998, Alko stores gradually switched from desk service (where customers asked shop attendants to retrieve products for them) to self-service.

Alko's previous logo, used until 2007

In 1995, when Finland joined the EU, the monopolies in production and import had to be lifted. Thus, the corporation was separated into Alko (distribution), Primalco (production of alcohol) and Havistra (bulk sales), which together formed the Altia Group; only Alko retained a monopoly.

In 1998, Alko was spun off entirely from the Altia Group, which was reorganized later to form Altia Oyj. While Altia Oyj and Alko remain legally separate, Alko is the major customer of Altia's products.

The history of Alko is presented at the Hotel and Restaurant Museum in Helsinki.

From 10 June 2024, the maximum alcohol level which retailers could freely sell alcoholic beverages changed from 5.5% to 8% ABV.

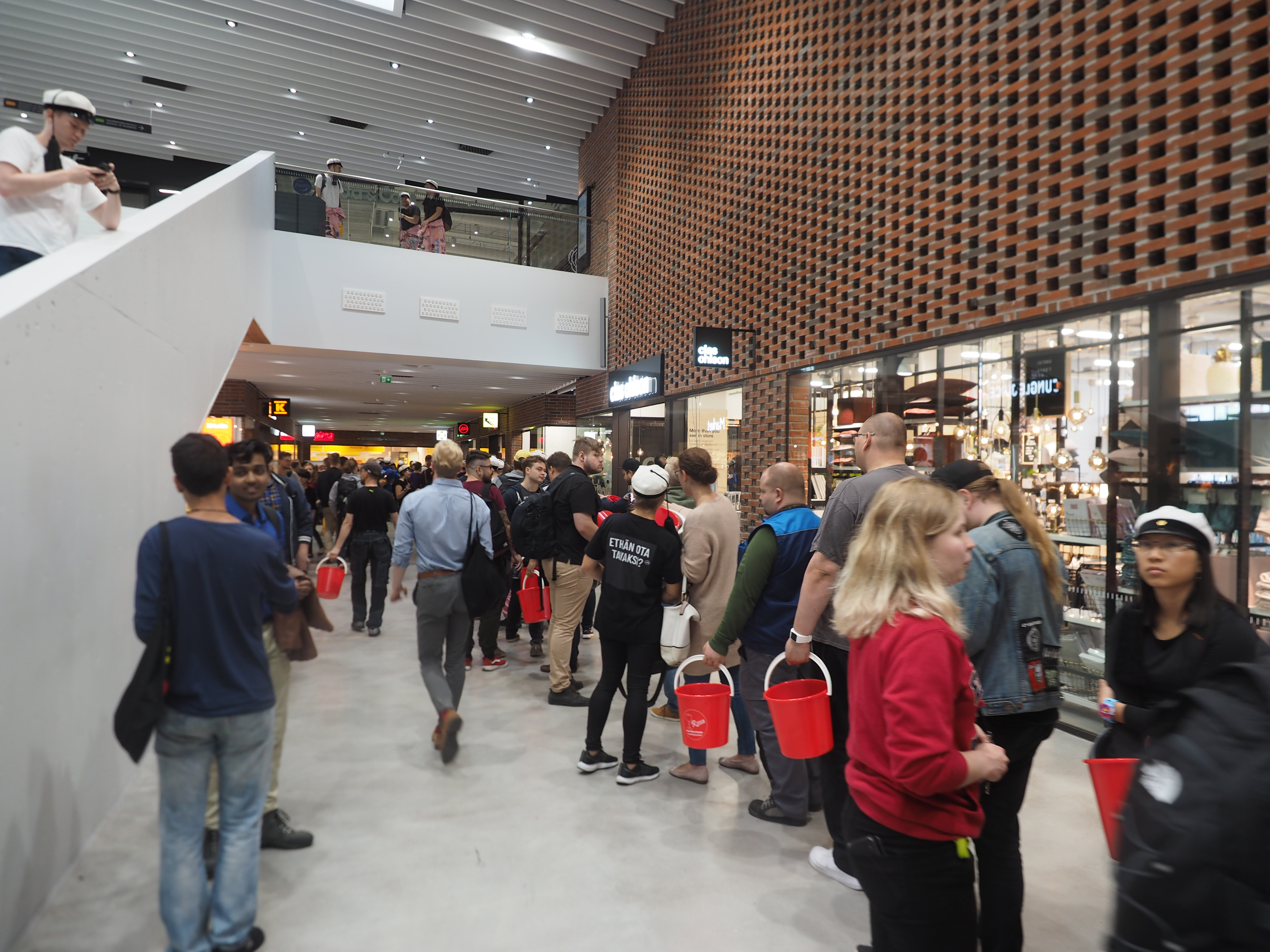
The Alko branch in Otaniemi, Espoo opened in September 2018, which led to students from Aalto University trying to buy its entire supply already on opening day.

== See also ==
- Finnish alcohol culture
- Magyar Fehér Bor
