= Renault (cognac) =

Renault is a manufacturer of Cognac, founded in 1835 by Jean-Antonin Renault in the town of Cognac, France.

The corporation has merged with Castillon and Bisquit Dubouché, and is based at Rouillac, Charente, a small village near Château de Lignères. In 2010 Finnish Altia Plc acquired the Renault brand.

A well-known product with international distribution is "Renault Carte Noir".
