= Braastad =

Brand of cognac

Tiffon
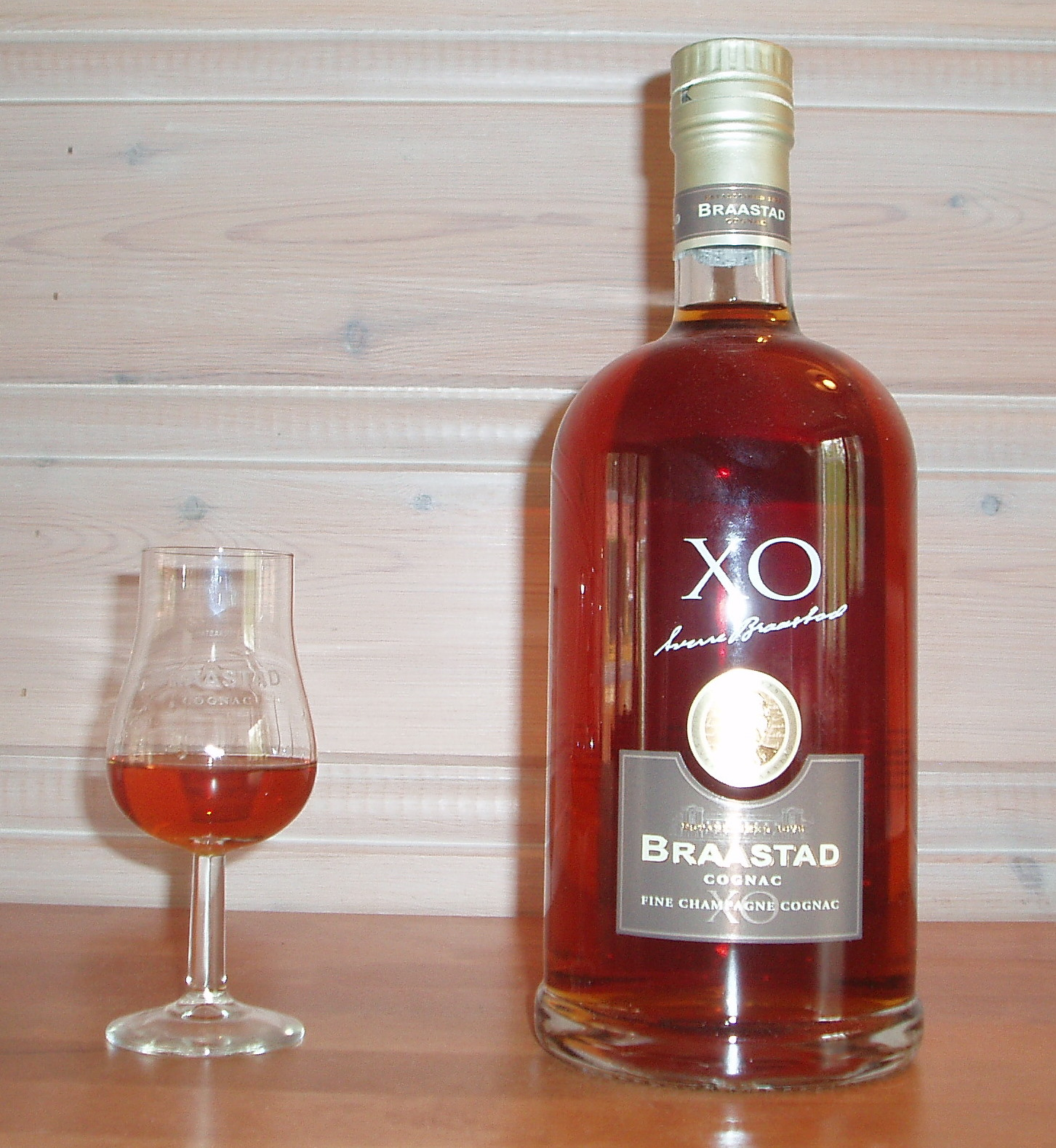
- Cognac Braastad XO in a glass
- Company type: public
- Industry: Wine & Spirits
- Founded: 1875
- Headquarters: Cognac, France
- Key people: Braastad Antoine; Braastad Richard
- Products: Tiffon; Braastad; Bonaparte
- Website: www.braastad.com

Braastad is a brand of cognac. It's a range of product from the cognac House Tiffon. The name Braastad was introduced when Sverre Braastad (1879 – May 16, 1979) from Gjøvik, Norway, married the daughter of cognac producer Tiffon, Edith Rousseau, in 1913, and took over Tiffon, founded by Médéric Rousseau in 1875. The home of Braastad and Tiffon is Château de Triac. It is situated in the cru Petite Champagne in the cognac area, France.

The Braastad brand is owned by the Norwegian spirits company Arcus AS, which also is a minority shareholder of Tiffon.

== Products ==
- V.S.
- V.S.O.P. (Winner of "Trophy Award 2003" at "International Wine and Spirits Competition")
- X.O. Fine Champagne
- X.O Supérieur
- Château de Triac Réserve de la Famille (average 50 year maturing period)
- Braastad 100 Ans de Liberté
- My Selection
- Organic

== Chateau de Triac ==
The home of Braastad and Tiffon is Château de Triac. It is situated in the cru Petite Champagne in the cognac area, France.
