= Altia =

Former Finnish vodka producer

Altia Oyj
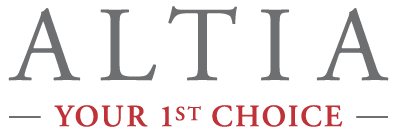
- Type: Julkinen osakeyhtiö
- Traded as: Nasdaq Helsinki: ALTIA
- Industry: Alcoholic beverage production, import & marketing
- Founded: 1999; 27 years ago
- Defunct: 1 September 2021; 4 years ago
- Fate: Merged with Arcus AS
- Successor: Anora Group
- Headquarters: Helsinki, Finland
- Key people: Pekka Tennilä (CEO)
- Owner: Government of Finland (35.9%)
- Number of employees: 880
- Website: altiagroup.com

Altia Oyj was a Finnish state-owned corporation based in Helsinki, which produces, imports, exports and markets alcoholic beverages. It operates in Finland, Sweden, Norway, Denmark, Estonia and Latvia. Altia has production plants in Koskenkorva and Rajamäki in Finland and in Tabasalu in Estonia. Altia's strategy is based on two complementary cornerstones – building own brands and providing a leading Nordic and Baltic service platform for partners to develop their business. The largest imported brands are Drostdy-Hof, Two Oceans and Jack Daniel's.

Altia's sales companies in the alcohol monopoly countries are Altia Finland, Alpha Beverages and Wennerco in Finland, Altia Sweden, Bibendum and Philipson Söderberg in Sweden and Interbev, Bibendum, Strøm and Best Buys in Norway. Altia Denmark, Altia Eesti, Altia Latvia and Jaunalko operate in the open markets Denmark, Estonia and Latvia.

The corporation was formed from the production and import sectors of the old alcohol monopoly Alko. Today, Altia is no longer a part of Alko, and Alko itself has only a distribution monopoly.

Altia acquired Scandinavian Beverage Group in 2004. In 2010 Altia acquired a portfolio of wine brands including Chill Out and Blossa Glögg and a portfolio of Swedish and Danish heritage spirits. The spirits portfolio consists of e.g. O. P. Anderson, Skåne Akvavit, Svenska Nubbar, 1-Enkelt Bitter, Brøndums Snaps, Larsen Cognac, Explorer Vodka, Kronvodka, Lord Calvert Canadian Whisky and Barracuda Rum. The acquisition also included Svendborg bottling facility in Denmark and the logistics centres in Odense, Denmark, and Årsta, Sweden.

In 2018, Altia became a publicly tradeable company on the Helsinki Stock Exchange.

The most famous own products of Altia are Koskenkorva and Jaloviina in Finland, Explorer Vodka, Grönstedt's Cognac, Blossa Glögg and Chill Out wines in Sweden, 1 Enkelt in Denmark, Saaremaa Vodka in Estonia and Renault Cognac in Travel Trade. Altia also produces Finlandia Vodka, which is wholly owned by the US spirits company, Brown-Forman. The sale of Finlandia to Brown-Forman Corporation is part of a broader privatization program to reduce Finland's government ownership of state-enterprise.

In 2020, Altia proposed a merger with the Norwegian alcohol wholesaler Arcus, subject to approval by competition regulators in Finland, Norway, and Sweden, where the new company will operate. The merger was completed 1 September 2021 forming Anora Group.
