= O.P. Anderson =

Brand of aquavit vodka

O.P. Anderson Aquavit
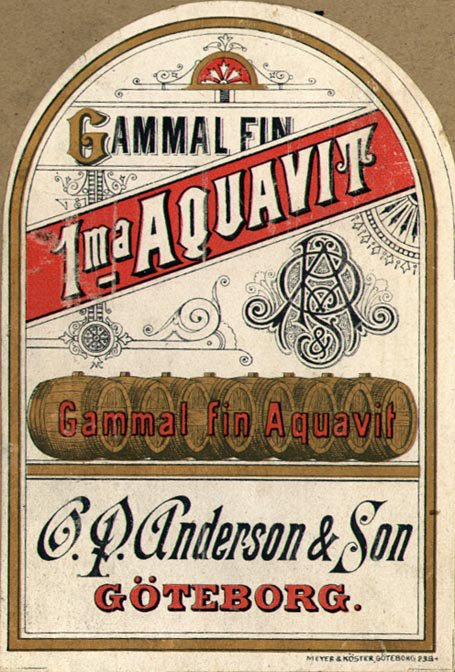
- O.P. Anderson original label from 1891
- Product type: Akvavit
- Current owner: Anora Group
- Produced by: O.P. Anderson & Son i Göteborg; Anora Group
- Country: Gothenburg
- Introduced: 1891
- Related brands: Gammaldags Norrlands Akvavit; Skåne Akvavit

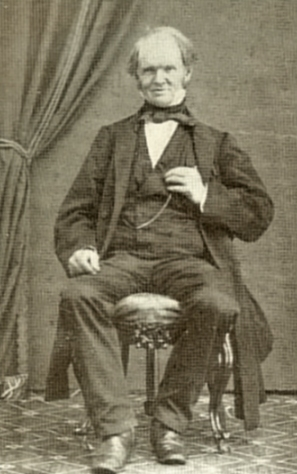
Olof Peter Anderson ca 1860

O.P. Anderson Aquavit is a Swedish spirit of the akvavit type, presented in 1891 for the Gothenburg Exhibition Fair under the name "Gammal Fin 1^{ma} Aquavit". The firm producing it was called O.P. Anderson & Son i Göteborg, which has later given name to this brand of akvavit. The aquavit was introduced by Carl August Anderson, Olof Peter Anderson's son, fifteen years after his father's death in 1876.

Göteborg is the Swedish name for Gothenburg.

O.P. Anderson Aquavit is the oldest and most sold akvavit of Sweden, spiced with caraway, anise and fennel and stored on oak barrels for eight months. The spices are the same in the akvavits Gammaldags Norrlands Akvavit from 1929 and Skåne Akvavit from 1931, but Norrlands has sherry added to it and Skåne is blander.

As of 2021, it is produced by Anora Group.
