= Arnbitter =

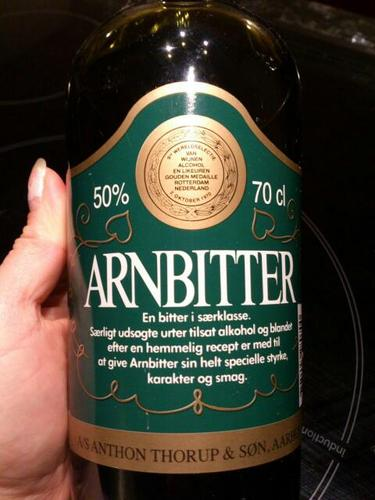
- Type: Bitters
- Manufacturer: Just Drinks
- Origin: Aarhus, Denmark
- Introduced: c. 1950
- Alcohol by volume: 50%
- Color: Brown
- Flavor: Spice
- Ingredients: Bitters
- Variants: Spice, Mint
- Website: www.justdrinks.dk/arnbitter/

Arnbitter is a Danish bitters produced and distributed by the Copenhagen based company Just Drinks, originally produced and developed in Aarhus. The drink can be traced back to the 1950s and is sold under the slogan "Hverken ny, trendy eller importeret" (Neither new, trendy nor imported). The recipe is secret but includes ginger, cloves, saffron and licorice root. Arnbitter is mixed in large 2,500 litre copper tanks where it is stored for 3 months before bottling.

== History ==
Arnbitter was invented by Arne M. Hansen who operated a wine storage in Viby J, a city district of Aarhus. It is not known exactly when the drink was first created but it is mentioned in the 1950s for the first time when Arne Hansen and sommelier Harald P. Sørensen experimented and created the finished result. In 1978 the company Anthon Thorup & Søn from 1893 bought the recipe and brewed and distributed it until 2015. The company closed in 2015 and sold the recipe to the company Just Drinks based in Copenhagen which moved production from Aarhus.

== Variants ==
There are two variants of the drink. The primary variant is 50% vol made with a number of herbs mixed with alcohol. It is sold in specialty stores and by sine wine and liqueur distributors and the Denmark-Germany border markets in Flensburg, Danish airports and on the Faroes. The other variant is Arnbitter Mint which is rarer. It was created in 1997 as an aperitif with menthol flavor and is only 40% vol. Arnbitter Mint is amber brown like regular Arnbitter but darker.

== Serving ==
Arnbitter is not a part of any traditional drinks or cocktails. However some local combinations are known.

- Fernarne: A shot mixed with equal parts Fernet Branca and Arnbitter.
- Green set: One beer of the brand Grøn (Green) Tuborg served with one shot of Arnbitter. It is marketed under the slogan "Du kan blive fuld af kompromisser" ("You can become full of compromises" and "You can become drunk of compromises")
- Aarhus set: A Ceres Top beer served with an Arnbitter shot on the side. The name references that both the beer and Arnbitter was originally brewed in Aarhus.
- Arnbomb: A bomb mixed drink with a shot of Arnbitter placed in a pint of beer and drunk all at once, as a play on Jägerbomb.

== Awards ==
- Arnbitter won gold at the international wine & spirit Exhibition 1970 in Rotterdam
- Arnbitter won silver at the International Wine & Spirit Competition 2005 in London
