= 1931 Finnish prohibition referendum =

29–30 December 1931
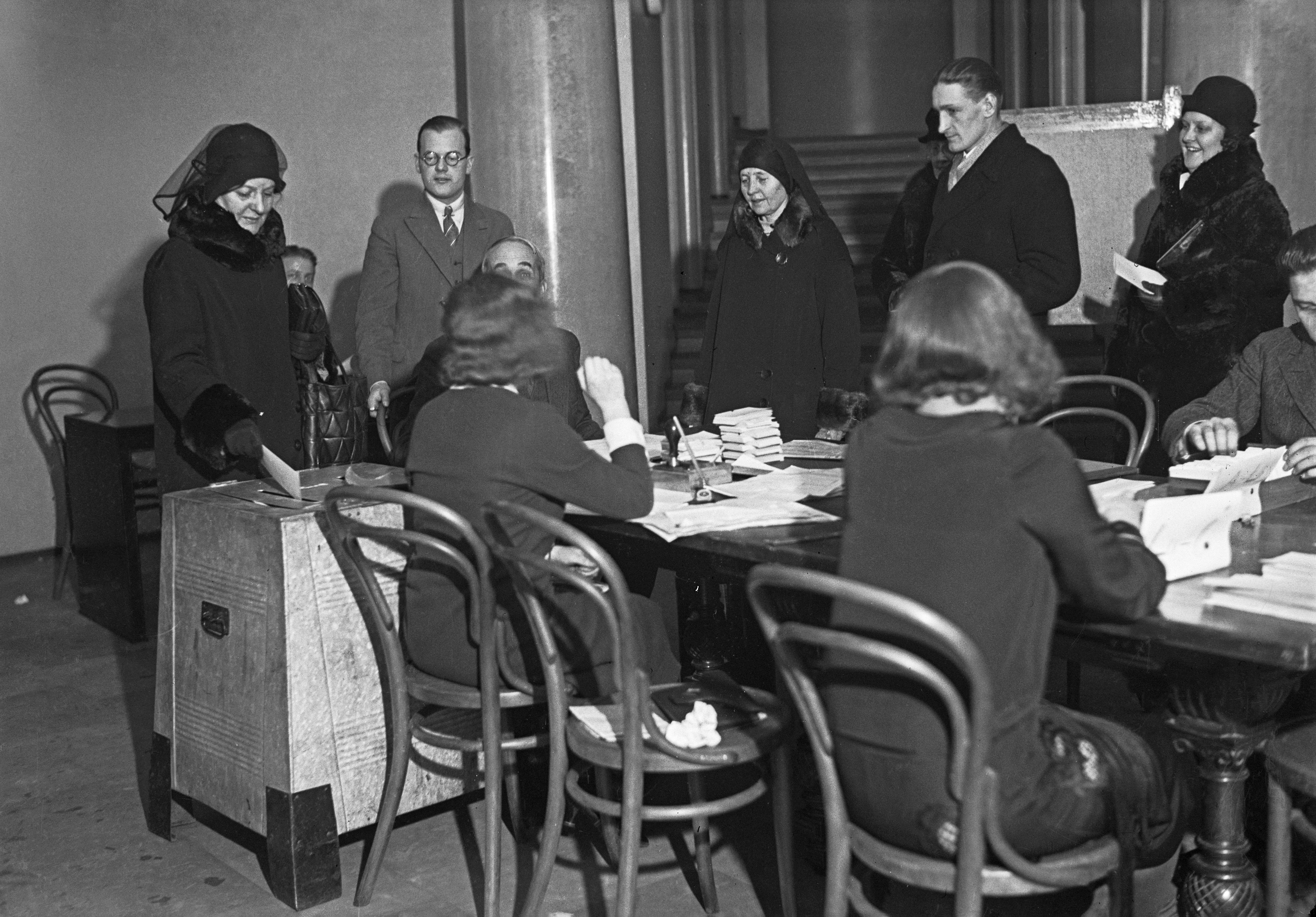
- Voting in Helsinki

Results
Choice	Votes	%
Complete abolition of prohibition	546,293	70.54%
Total prohibition	217,169	28.04%
Weak alcoholic drinks allowed	10,947	1.41%
Valid votes	774,409	99.55%
Invalid or blank votes	3,476	0.45%
Total votes	777,885	100.00%
Registered voters/turnout	1,752,315	44.39%

A referendum on prohibition was held in Finland on 29 and 30 December 1931. Voters were asked whether they approved of the continuation of the prohibition law passed in 1919. Of the three options presented, the complete abolition of prohibition was backed by 70.5% of voters with a turnout of only 44.4%.

Support for prohibition was stronger among women than men, and stronger in rural areas than in cities. Turnout for men (53%) was significantly higher than for women (37%), while turnout in cities (54%) was higher than in rural areas (42%). The ballots used by men and women were different colours.

== Results ==
Choice	Votes	%
Complete abolition of prohibition	546,293	70.54
Total prohibition	217,169	28.04
Weak alcoholic drinks allowed	10,947	1.41
Total	774,409	100.00
Valid votes	774,409	99.55
Invalid/blank votes	3,476	0.45
Total votes	777,885	100.00
Registered voters/turnout	1,752,315	44.39
Source: Nohlen & Stöver, Direct Democracy
