= Advania =

Swedish information technology company

Advania AB
- Industry: Information technology
- Founded: 1939: Founded as EJS; 2012: Advania
- Headquarters: Stockholm, Sweden
- Number of locations: 53 in 9 countries (2024)
- Area served: Northern Europe
- Key people: Gestur Gestsson, COB; Hege Støre, CEO; Henrik Schibler, CFO; Henrik Foyn-Laukvik, Head of M&A; Ægir Þórisson, CPO; Janne Ahonen, CEO Finland; Hege Støre, CEO UK; Hildur Einarsdóttir, CEO Iceland; Sigurður Þorsteinsson, CEO Denmark; Siv Hjellegjerde Martinsen, CEO Norway; Tomas Wanselius, CEO Sweden
- Operating income: SEK 18.4 billion (2024)
- Owner: Goldman Sachs Asset Management (majority), IK Partners, VIA equity and others.
- Number of employees: 5,500+
- Website: advania.com (in English); advania.co.uk (in English); advania.dk (in Danish); advania.fi (in Finnish); advania.is (in Icelandic); advania.no (in Norwegian); advania.se (in Swedish)

Advania is a Northern European information technology (IT) services provider headquartered in Stockholm, Sweden. It operates in Sweden, Iceland, Norway, Finland, Denmark, Ireland, and the United Kingdom with international talent hubs in South Africa, Sri Lanka, Serbia, Spain, Slovenia, Germany, Poland, and the United States.

Advania provides managed, cloud, cybersecurity, artificial intelligence services, IT consulting, asset lifecycle management, and value-added reselling. It is majority-owned by Goldman Sachs.

== History ==
=== 1939-2012: Early history ===
Advania's origins trace to 1939, when Icelandic entrepreneur Einar J. Skúlason founded EJS, an office equipment repair workshop in Reykjavík that later expanded into computing. In 1952, the Icelandic government and the city of Reykjavík established Skýrr, an IT company tasked with leading public sector computing and record keeping in Iceland; it was privatized in 1995 and later absorbed the EJS. These and other Icelandic firms were consolidated under the parent company Teymis during the 2000s. Following the 2008 financial crisis, Teymis merged its IT subsidiaries, Kögun, Landsteinar, Eskill and Strengur, into a single entity called Skýrr. Skýrr later acquired Thor data center in 2011.

In Sweden, Nokia Elektronic AB (later Datapoint and Kerfi) had operated since 1971. In Norway, Merkantildata Applikasjon (later Hands) was established in 1991 as an IT consulting and ERP firm. These Swedish and Norwegian companies were merged with HugurAx and Skýrr to form Advania in January 2012.

=== 2012-present: Acquisitions and growth ===
After its formation, Advania expanded through acquisitions across Northern Europe. In Iceland, it acquired Tölvumidluðun in 2015. It also acquired Wise lausnir from AKVA Group in 2018, and in 2024 it agreed to take over Data Dwell's Salesforce customer business.

Advania entered Finland through the acquisition of Vintor in 2019. It later acquired Accountor ICT in 2020, Beveric in 2021, and Valtti in 2022. In 2023, Advania Finland acquired Core Service Oy's Apple device sales business and Edutaito Oy to expand its AV and presentation technology services.

In Norway, Advania expanded its infrastructure and consulting services through acquisitions including Stepper and Itello in 2019. In 2021, it acquired the security specialist Painkiller and Visolit, a Norway-based cloud services provider operating in Norway and Sweden. In 2022, it acquired a consultancy firm, eXspend. In 2024, Advania acquired the remaining minority stake in Solv AS, making Advania the sole owner.

In Denmark, Advania expanded its presence by acquiring Kompetera in 2020, followed by the hosting specialist Genia in 2021 and CLOUDIO in 2022.

In Sweden, Advania expanded its presence in 2015 by acquiring Knowledge Factory, which was operating in Sweden and Norway at the time of acquisition. In April 2017, Advania launched a recommended public cash offer of SEK 34 per share, valuing Swedish First North-listed IT company Caperio Holding at approximately SEK 158 million; the offer was completed in June 2017 with Advania securing more than 94% of the shares. In 2022, it acquired Hi5 in northern Sweden, followed by RTS Group AB in 2023 to expand large-scale transformation and managed services capacity. In 2025, it acquired the audio-visual specialist Visuell Teknik, applied AI consultancy firm AI Framework in Sweden.

In 2021, Advania entered the United Kingdom through the acquisition of Content+Cloud, a London-based Microsoft cloud services provider. Through Content+Cloud, Advania acquired Azzure IT, a Sheffield based company specializing in Microsoft cloud business. Subsequent UK acquisitions include Servium and CCS Media in 2024. In 2025, Advania expanded its operations to Ireland and acquired CCS Media Ireland.

In February 2025, Advania acquired Swedish integrated audio-visual and meeting room technology, Visuell Teknik. In July 2025, Advania acquired The AI Framework, an AI services provider in Northern Europe. In August 2025, Advania acquired Gompute, a high-performance computing (HPC) and AI infrastructure business that had previously operated as part of the Nordic data center company atNorth. In October 2025, Advania extended further into the DACH region with the acquisition of German legal tech firm smartvokat GmbH.

In 2026, Advania acquired Evolv Robotics ehf, an Icelandic specialist in robotic process automation (RPA). The company also expanded its operations in Denmark through the acquisition of Cortex A.S.

== Operations ==
Advania is headquartered in Stockholm, Sweden with operations across Scandinavia and the United Kingdom. It is a privately held company, with majority ownership acquired by Goldman Sachs in 2021 alongside management shareholders.

Its organizational structure is decentralized, with country-level and regional teams responsible for operational decisions. Its regional headquarters are located in Reykjavík, Oslo, Copenhagen, Helsinki, and London.

== Services ==
Advania provides IT infrastructure management and outsourcing services, including data center, network, and cloud infrastructure. Its services include public and hybrid cloud solutions, cybersecurity, end-user workplace technologies, unified communications, and managed IT services.

Advania works with Microsoft platforms such as Microsoft 365, Azure, and Dynamics 365. In the United Kingdom, its operations include Modern Workplace services, data and analytics (including AI-related applications), cybersecurity, and business application development. Advania also provides service desk support, IT consulting, and digital transformation advisory services to enterprise clients.

== Sustainability initiative ==
In 2023, Advania announced Dreamhouse, a 10,000-square-meter IT equipment recycling facility in Enköping, Sweden. The facility opened in January 2025 and can refurbish up to one million IT devices annually, reducing carbon footprints by up to 70% compared to new equipment. Dreamhouse operates on solar energy and geothermal heating to minimize environmental impact.
