= Arcus (company) =

Norwegian alcoholic beverage wholesaler

Arcus AS
- Type: Aksjeselskap
- Traded as: OSE: ARCUS
- Industry: Alcoholic beverages
- Founded: 1996
- Defunct: 2021
- Fate: Merged with Altia
- Successor: Anora Group
- Headquarters: Hagan, Nittedal, Norway,
- Area served: Norway
- Key people: Kenneth Hamnes (CEO)
- Number of employees: 76 (2026)
- Website: www.arcus.no

Arcus AS was Norway's largest wholesaler of wine and liquor. It was created when it was demerged from the state-owned wine and liquor retailer Vinmonopolet on January 1, 1996. The retailing operations were kept in Vinmonopolet; import, export, production, and storage were transferred to Arcus.

In July 2001 the Norwegian Ministry of Trade and Industry sold 66% of the company to Sucra. Sucra were also in 2001 granted an option to purchase the rest of the company, which they did in 2003. In 2005 Sucra sold Arcus to the Swedish investment company Ratos, including the partial ownership of Braastad. In 2012 Danish Distillers (Aalborg Taffel, etc., Gammel Dansk) was bought from Pernod Ricard. But the akvavit brand Brøndums snaps, which was a brand of Danish Distillers since a merger in 1893, had to be divested because of the dominant position of Danish Distillers in the Danish market. This akvavit brand was sold to Finnish distillers Altia. The factory in Aalborg closed April 2015 when production of the Aalborg brands was moved to Norway. Arcus has both storage of beverages from when it was demerged as well as recipes from Vinmonopolet, some of which date back a long time, including the recipes taken over from the purchase of Løitens Brænderi in 1927.

Arcus was listed on the Oslo Stock Exchange in December 2016.

Arcus was the largest player in the Norwegian wine market, the second largest in Sweden, and number five in Finland.

Arcus merged with Altia in 2021 to form Anora Group.

== Arcus wine companies in Sweden ==
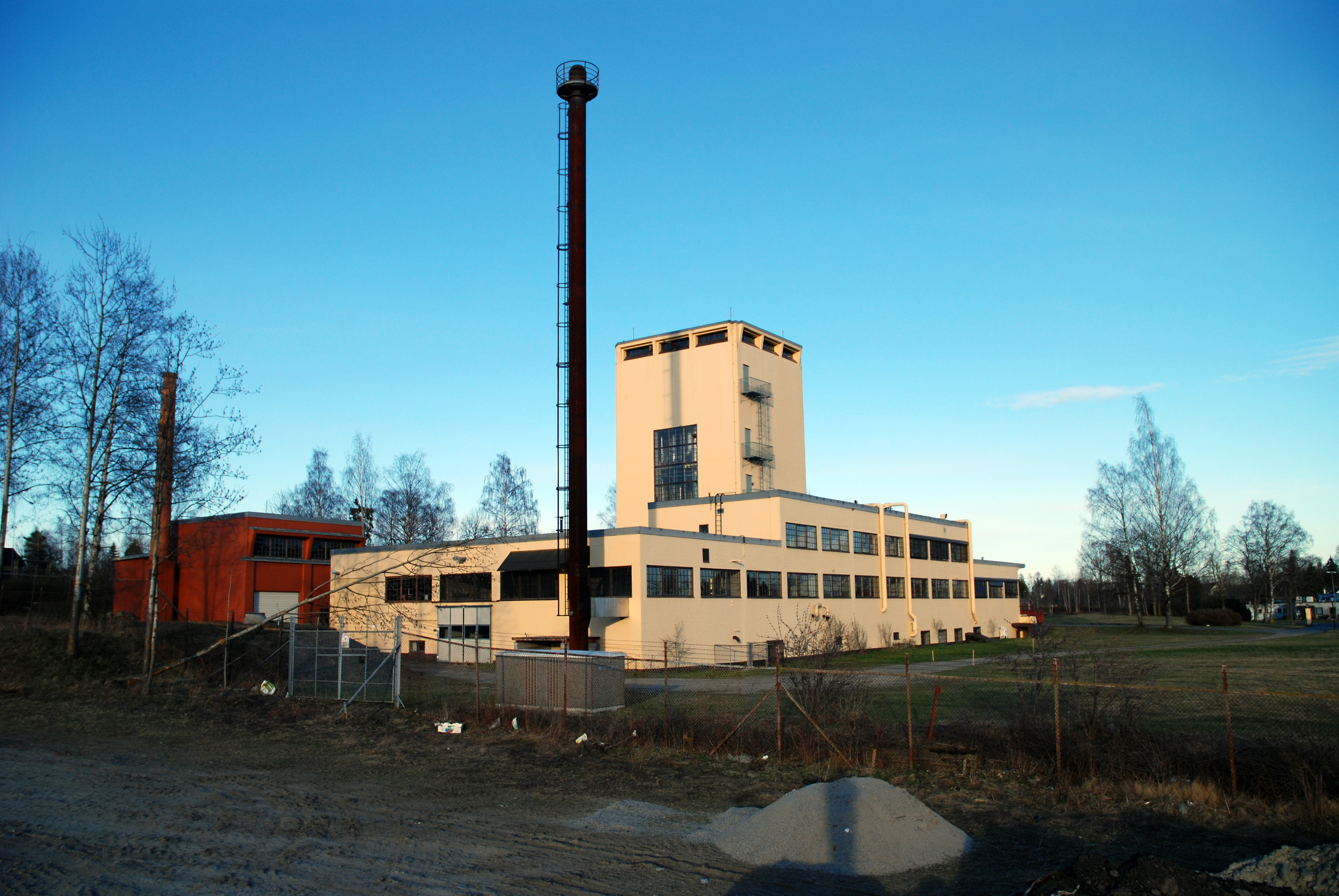
Arcus plant in Hamar

The Wineagency

Quaffable Wines

Valid Wines

Vinunic

== Arcus wine companies in Norway ==
Arcus Wine Brands

Symposium Wines

Heyday Wines AS

Vinordia

Excellars

Hedoni Wines

== Arcus wine companies in Finland ==
WineWorld Finland

Social Wines Finland

Vinum Import

Vinunic

== Brands ==
- Aalborg Taffel
- Amundsen Arctic Vodka
- Arendalsaquavit
- Bergens Aquavit
- Braastad Cognac
- Gammel Dansk
- Gammel Opland
- Gilde Aquavit
- Golden Cock
- Hammer Vodka
- Jægersborg Aquavit
- Kalinka 22
- LINIE
- Lysholm No52
- Løiten
- Morsa Aquavit
- Royal Castle
- Vikingfjord Vodka

Arcus is also an importer of wine.
