= Entreprise de recherches et d'activités pétrolières =

Entreprise de recherches et d'activités pétrolières is a French petroleum company created in 1965 by the merger of RAP (Régie autonome des pétroles) and BRP (Bureau de recherche des pétroles). In 1976 ERAP merged with the oil company Société nationale des pétroles d’Aquitaine (SNPA) giving birth to Société nationale Elf Aquitaine (SNEA), better known as Elf Aquitaine. Later this company merged with TotalFina into TotalFinaElf, which later changed its name to TotalEnergies.

Today ERAP is a state-owned company (Établissement public à caractère industriel et commercial), making investments in sectors of energy, pharmacy and telecommunication.
