= Ratos =

Swedish investment company

Ratos AB
- Type: Public (Nasdaq Stockholm: RATO B)
- Industry: Investment company
- Founded: 1933; 93 years ago
- Headquarters: Stockholm, Sweden
- Key people: Per-Olof Söderberg (Chairman of the board), Gustaf Salford (President and CEO)
- Products: Financial services
- Website: www.ratos.com

Ratos AB (portmanteau for Ragnar and Torsten Söderberg) is a Swedish listed investment company founded in 1934. Ratos is listed on the Stockholm Stock Exchange. Ratos is a long-term investment company owning both majority and minority holdings in Nordic companies. Ratos has net sales of SEK 19 billion and an adjusted EBITA of SEK 1.9 billion (2025), and with approximately 9,100 employees and is headquartered in Stockholm, Sweden.

== Strategy ==
Ratos has returned to being a long-term investment company with both majority and minority holdings in Nordic companies. Ratos has financial targets that support profitable and capital-efficient growth to maximize long-term shareholder value through active ownership and value creation in its portfolio companies. The new strategy is to be implemented over the period 2026–2028, with the aim of building a more focused Ratos, driving profitable and capital-efficient growth through organic development and add-on acquisitions, and strengthening Ratos' ways of working.

Ratos continues to focus its portfolio and employs a sector-neutral investment model with a primary focus on Nordic companies in the industrial and infrastructure sectors. The emphasis is on value creation in standalone companies within Ratos' core portfolio.

The investment scope is being broadened beyond unlisted, majority-owned companies to also include unlisted minority holdings and minority holdings in listed companies.

== Ratos Portfolio ==
=== Majority-owned platform companies ===
- Diab Group A global company developing and manufacturing advanced structural core materials and solutions for lighter, sustainable applications in high-performance industries. (stake 98%) (www.diabgroup.com/)
- HL Display A global leader helping stores and brands create attractive, efficient and more sustainable store environments with innovative solutions that enhance the shopping experience. (stake 98%)(www.hl-display.com/)
- Knightec GroupThe leading Nordic professional services firm, helping companies solve complex business challenges through the combination of business strategy and technology development. (stake 90%)(www.knightecgroup.com/)
- Presis Infra A leading provider of critical infrastructure maintenance in Norway and Sweden, contributing to the safety and reliability of key transport networks. (stake 98%)(www.presisvegdrift.no/)

=== Majority-owned companies to develop ===
- Aleido A leader in information lifecycle solutions, bridging the gap between technology and people. (stake 100%)(www.aleido.com/)
- LEDiL A global leader in secondary optics for LED lighting, from street lighting to retail and office environments. (stake 64%)(www.ledil.com/)
- Speed Group One of the Nordic region's leading third-party logistics providers.(stake 32%)

(www.speedgroup.se/)

- TFS HealthScience A global contract research organization that partners with biotech and pharmaceutical companies to run clinical trials and bring innovative treatments through development.(stake 100%)(www.tfscro.com/)

=== Minority holdings ===
- Aibel A leading provider of EPCI services (Engineering, Procurement, Construction and Installation) that designs, builds and maintains platforms and other critical infrastructure in the energy industry.(stake 85%)(www.aibel.com/)
- Sentia A Nordic listed construction group with a leading position in selected markets. (stake 31%)(www.sentiagruppen.com)

=== Consumer goods ===
- Kvd Group Sweden's leading trading platform for all types of vehicles — where effortless, secure transactions and expert knowledge enabling people to discover new experiences. (stake 100%)(www.kvd.se)
- OASE Outdoors A leading and innovative supplier of camping and outdoor equipment. (stake 78%)(www.oase-outdoors.dk/)
- PlantasjenThe Nordic region's leading garden centre chain for a greener life, with a comprehensive range of living plants and products for both indoor gardening and outdoor living. (stake 100%)(www.plantasjen.no/no)

== History ==
The Söderberg brothers established Ratos in 1933, as a holding company for the family's growing enterprises. At the time the family was owners of Söderberg & Haak. Ratos developed with extensive ownership in companies such as Stora Kopparberg, Gränges and Esselte in addition to a wholly owned steel division. It was listed on the stock exchange in 1954.

In 1979 the steel division, that at the time was called Tibnor, was sold to the state owned SSAB as part of the re-organization of the crisis hit steel industry. After that the company expanded into new areas, including a larger number of transport companies, the hotel chain Scandic Hotels and the plumbing chain Dahl International. During this period Sven Söderberg (1928–2004) was President and CEO.

In 2019, Ratos sold the Adelswärdska house, the building on Drottninggatan in Stockholm. Buyers were the National Property Board of Sweden. The reason for the sale was the increasingly increased safety requirements in the environment, as the building lies between the Sagerska palace (the Prime Minister's Housing) and Rosenbad (Government Offices) and the area was increasingly blocked off. The property was purchased by Söderberg & Haak in 1938 and later became rated.
