= Wine shipping laws in the United States =

Wine shipping laws in the United States differ between states and are controlled by state law. While most alcohol sales are controlled by the three-tier system, nearly all states now permit some form of direct shipping of wine from wineries to consumers. Most states require wineries to pay for a permit in order to ship to consumers in the state, resulting in a winery-dependent slate of states that it may ship to. Direct wine shipments are also typically subject to sales and/or excise taxes. Most states also limit the quantity of wine that may be purchased monthly or annually, usually in terms of the number of nine-liter cases of wine that may be shipped, though most consumers are unaffected by these limits. Shipment of wine to dry areas is illegal.

In the 2005 case Granholm v. Heald, the Supreme Court ruled that states must regulate direct shipment of wines to consumers from in-state and out-of-state wineries in the same way, either allowing or banning both. Since that ruling, more states gradually began to allow direct shipment of wine from wineries to consumers. Some states also allow direct shipment of wine from out-of-state retailers to consumers.

== Laws by state ==
=== Alabama ===
Direct shipments of wine are generally prohibited in Alabama. However, individual consumers may receive such shipments by obtaining prior written approval from the Alcoholic Beverage Control Board. The shipment must be consigned, with freight charges prepaid, directly to the individual in care of an ABC store.

=== Alaska ===
Wine can be shipped directly to consumers in Alaska, except in certain dry communities.

=== Arizona ===
Consumers in Arizona are limited to 12 cases shipped directly to them annually from wineries.

=== Arkansas ===
Direct shipment of wine is prohibited in Arkansas for off-site sales; consumers may place on-site orders for shipment at wineries.

=== California ===
Direct shipment of wine to consumers in California is allowed.

=== Colorado ===
Direct shipment of wine to consumers in Colorado is allowed.

=== Connecticut ===
Consumers in Connecticut are limited to 2 cases per person shipped directly to them every 2 months.

=== Delaware ===
Direct shipment of wine is prohibited in Delaware for off-site sales; consumers may place on-site orders for shipment at wineries.

=== District of Columbia ===
Consumers in the District of Columbia are limited to 1 case per person shipped directly to them per month.

=== Florida ===
Direct shipment to consumers in Florida is permitted, except in certain dry counties.

=== Georgia ===
Consumers in Georgia are limited to 12 cases shipped directly to them annually.

=== Hawaii ===
Consumers in Hawaii are limited to 6 cases shipped directly to them annually.

=== Idaho ===
Consumers in Idaho are limited to 24 cases shipped directly to them annually.

=== Illinois ===
Consumers in Illinois are limited to 12 cases shipped directly to them annually.

=== Indiana ===
Consumers in Indiana are limited to 24 cases shipped directly to them annually.

=== Iowa ===
Direct shipment of wine from wineries to consumers in Iowa is allowed.

=== Kansas ===
Consumers in Kansas are limited to 12 cases shipped directly to them annually from wineries.

=== Kentucky ===
Carriers refuse to ship wine directly to Kentucky consumers, due to the difficulty of distinguishing dry areas from "wet" ones. Shipping wine to dry areas in Kentucky is a felony offense.

=== Louisiana ===
Direct shipment of wine to consumers in Louisiana is allowed, but only for wines that are not distributed by any wholesaler in the state.

=== Maine ===
Consumers in Maine are limited to 12 cases shipped directly to them annually from wineries.

=== Maryland ===
Consumers in Maryland are limited to 18 cases shipped directly to them annually from wineries.

=== Massachusetts ===
On January 14, 2010, the case of FWC v. Jenkins in Boston struck down limits on wine shipments to Massachusetts. Despite that ruling, wine shipments to Massachusetts were largely impossible until January 1, 2015, when direct shipping from wineries to consumers in Massachusetts of up to 12 cases per year became allowed by law.

=== Michigan ===
Direct shipment of wine from wineries to consumers in Michigan is allowed.

=== Minnesota ===
Consumers in Minnesota are limited to 2 cases shipped directly to them annually.

=== Mississippi ===
Direct shipment of wine is prohibited in Mississippi.

=== Missouri ===
Consumers in Missouri are limited to 2 cases shipped directly to them per month.

=== Montana ===
Consumers in Montana are limited to 18 cases shipped directly to them annually.

=== Nebraska ===
Consumers in Nebraska are limited to 12 cases shipped directly to them annually.

=== Nevada ===
Consumers in Nevada are limited to 12 cases shipped directly to them annually.

=== New Hampshire ===
Consumers in New Hampshire are limited to 12 cases shipped directly to them annually.

=== New Jersey ===
Only small wineries that make less than 250,000 gallons of wine annually are allowed to ship up to 12 cases of wine per year to consumers in New Jersey.

=== New Mexico ===
Consumers in New Mexico are limited to 2 cases per person shipped directly to them per month.

=== New York ===
Consumers in New York are limited to 36 cases per person shipped directly to them annually.

=== North Carolina ===
Consumers in North Carolina are limited to 2 cases per person shipped directly to them per month.

=== North Dakota ===
Consumers in North Dakota are limited to 3 cases shipped directly per person per month.

=== Ohio ===
Only small wineries that make less than 250,000 gallons of wine annually are allowed to ship up to 24 cases of wine per year to consumers in Ohio.

=== Oklahoma ===
Consumers in Oklahoma are limited to 6 cases per person shipped directly to them annually.

=== Oregon ===
Consumers in Oregon are limited to 2 cases shipped directly per person per month.

=== Pennsylvania ===
Consumers in Pennsylvania are limited to 36 cases per person shipped directly to them annually by a wine producer licensed by the Pennsylvania Liquor Control Board as a direct wine shipper.

=== Rhode Island ===
Direct shipment of wine is prohibited in Rhode Island for off-site sales; consumers may place on-site orders for shipment at wineries.

=== South Carolina ===
Consumers in South Carolina are limited to 2 cases per person shipped directly to them per month.

=== South Dakota ===
Consumers in South Dakota are limited to 12 cases shipped directly to them annually.

=== Tennessee ===
Wineries may ship no more than one case per month, nor three per year, directly to an individual consumer in Tennessee.

=== Texas ===
Consumers in Texas are limited to nine gallons monthly and no more than 36 gallons annually shipped directly per person.

=== Utah ===
Direct shipment of wine to consumers in Utah is prohibited and classified as a felony. Adult residents returning from a foreign country are permitted to bring no more than one quart of wine with them. Individuals moving to the state are not limited to the amount of wine they may bring, as long as the taxes have been paid and cleared by the Department of Alcoholic Beverage Control.

=== Vermont ===
Consumers in Vermont are limited to 12 cases shipped directly to them annually.

=== Virginia ===
Consumers in Virginia are limited to 2 cases shipped directly to them per month.

=== Washington ===
Direct shipment of wine to consumers in Washington is allowed.

=== West Virginia ===
Consumers in West Virginia are limited to 2 cases per person shipped directly to them per month, but wine may not be delivered in dry areas.

=== Wisconsin ===
Consumers in Wisconsin are limited to 12 cases shipped directly to them annually.

=== Wyoming ===
Consumers in Wyoming are limited to 4 cases shipped directly to them in any 12-month period.

== See also ==
- List of alcohol laws of the United States by state
- Wine law
- Wine of the United States
