= List of dry communities by U.S. state =

Map of alcohol dry and wet counties in the United States

The following list of dry areas by U.S. state details all of the counties, parishes, boroughs, and municipalities in the United States of America that ban the sale of alcoholic beverages.

For more background information, see dry county and Prohibition in the United States. For more information on semi-wet counties, see moist county.

== Overview ==
=== States that permit localities to go dry ===
34 states have laws that allow localities to prohibit the sale (and in some cases, consumption and possession) of liquor. Still, many of these states have no dry communities. Two states—Kansas and Tennessee—are entirely dry by default: counties specifically must authorize the sale of alcohol in order for it to be legal and subject to state liquor control laws.

- Alabama specifically allows cities and counties to elect to go dry by public referendum.
- Alaska specifically allows local jurisdictions to elect to go dry by public referendum.
- Arkansas specifically allows local jurisdictions to elect to go dry by public referendum.
- California specifically allows local jurisdictions to enact liquor laws that are stricter than state law.
- Colorado specifically allows cities and counties to exercise a local option by public referendum whether to go dry.
- Connecticut specifically allows towns to exercise a local option by public referendum whether to go dry.
- Delaware's state constitution allows specifically defined local districts (namely Sussex County, Kent County, the City of Wilmington, and the remainder of New Castle County) to elect to go dry by public referendum.
- Florida specifically allows counties to elect to go dry by public referendum.
- Georgia specifically allows any local jurisdiction to go dry, without limitation on how that decision is made.
- Idaho allows local jurisdictions to prohibit sale of liquor by the drink by public referendum, but because all retail package sales are controlled by the state, no local jurisdiction may prohibit package liquor sales for consumption off-premises.
- Kansas is dry by default; counties have to choose to allow liquor sales in order for liquor to be sold at all in the county. (see Alcohol laws of Kansas)
- Kentucky specifically allows local jurisdictions to elect to go dry by public referendum. The Kentucky Constitution implies that the default wet/dry status of any local subdivision reflects the state of its local laws at the time that statewide prohibition ended.
- Louisiana specifically allows local jurisdictions to go dry, without limitation on how that decision is made.
- Maine specifically allows local jurisdictions to elect to go dry by public referendum.
- Massachusetts requires that a series of questions of whether to go dry be placed on each municipality's local ballot every two years, unless the municipality has voted to allow or prohibit liquor sales in three such consecutive elections.
- Michigan allows any city, village, or township in which there are no retail liquor licenses to prohibit the retail sale of alcoholic liquor within its borders by passage of an ordinance.
- Minnesota allows any local jurisdiction to enact laws that are stricter than state liquor law, including completely prohibiting the sale, possession, and consumption of alcoholic beverages.
- Mississippi is wet by default; local jurisdictions have to choose to go dry via referendum.
- Montana state law vests control of alcoholic beverages solely in the power of the state, although county voters may, by initiative, prohibit alcohol sales. The Crow Indian Reservation and Northern Cheyenne Indian Reservation are fully dry. Since the Reservations are considered federal lands, state laws do not apply. Tribal law bans possession and sale of alcohol completely, even if not tribal members.
- New Hampshire specifically allows local jurisdictions to elect to go dry by public referendum.
- New Jersey specifically allows local jurisdictions to exercise control over the sale of alcoholic beverages in retail establishments (liquor stores, restaurants) and to limit or refuse to issue retail licenses.
- New Mexico is wet by default. Law does, however, allow for local jurisdictions to elect to go dry by public referendum.
- New York specifically allows cities and counties to exercise a local option by public referendum whether to go dry. (see Alcohol laws of New York)
- North Carolina allows certain classes of local jurisdictions to exercise a local option by public referendum whether to go dry.
- Ohio state law allows local jurisdictions to exercise a local option by public referendum whether to prohibit the sale of liquor.
- Rhode Island state law allows local jurisdictions to exercise a local option by public referendum whether to prohibit the sale of liquor.
- South Dakota allows certain classes of local jurisdictions to exercise a local option by public referendum whether to prohibit the on-premises sale of liquor.
- Tennessee is dry by default; local jurisdictions must choose whether to allow liquor sales in order for liquor to be sold. (see Alcohol laws of Tennessee)
- Texas allows local jurisdictions to exercise a local option to decide whether it is "wet" or "dry," and does not limit how that decision shall be made.
- Vermont allows municipalities to exercise a local option by public referendum whether to prohibit the sale of liquor.
- Virginia allows local jurisdictions to exercise a local option by public referendum whether to prohibit the sale of liquor.
- Washington allows local jurisdictions to exercise a local option by public referendum whether to prohibit the sale of liquor.
- West Virginia allows local jurisdictions to exercise a local option by public referendum whether to prohibit the sale of liquor.
- Wisconsin allows local jurisdictions to exercise a local option by public referendum whether to prohibit the sale of liquor.

=== States that preclude dry communities ===
16 states have laws that preclude the existence of any dry counties whatsoever:

- Arizona prohibits local jurisdictions from enacting any alcohol laws stricter than state law. As a result, no dry communities can exist in Arizona.
- Hawaii does not allow for any local control of liquor beyond licensing of manufacture and sale.
- Illinois only allows for local control as to the "number, kind and classification of licenses, for sale at retail of alcoholic liquor," but such local control cannot supersede state law, thereby preventing any local jurisdiction from going dry.
- Indiana's comprehensive state alcohol laws only allow local liquor boards to issue liquor licenses for sale and manufacture; all other regulation of alcohol is an operation of state law.
- Iowa state law specifically requires each county's liquor board to allow liquor licenses and follow the provisions of state liquor law. As a result, there can be no dry cities or counties in Iowa.
- Maryland prohibits local jurisdictions from imposing restrictions on licensing that are stricter than state law.
- Missouri state law specifically prohibits any counties, or unincorporated city or town from banning the retail sale of liquor, but only allows incorporated cities to ban the sale of liquor by the drink by public referendum. No incorporated Missouri cities have ever chosen to hold a referendum banning alcohol sales. In addition, Missouri state law specifically supersedes any local laws that restrict the sale of alcohol. (see Alcohol laws of Missouri)
- Nebraska only grants local governing bodies authority to approve applications and deny licenses pursuant to state law.
- Nevada state law specifically requires each county's board of county commissioners to allow liquor licenses and follow the provisions of state liquor law. As a result, there can be no dry cities or counties in Nevada, except that a few rural jurisdictions are grandfathered into the ability to still be partially or totally dry.
- North Dakota state law provides that each local jurisdiction's liquor board must allow liquor licenses, and sets the range of allowable fees.
- Oklahoma state law requires the liquor ordinances of municipalities and counties to conform to the state Alcoholic Beverage Control Act, and prohibits local jurisdictions from enacting penalties more severe than those of the state law. As a result, there can be no dry cities or counties in Oklahoma. (see Alcohol laws of Oklahoma)
- Oregon's Liquor Control Act, which is "designed to operate uniformly throughout the state," specifically replaces and supersedes "any and all municipal charter enactments or local ordinances inconsistent with it," thereby precluding dry communities in Oregon.
- Pennsylvania state law vests control of alcoholic beverages solely in the power of the Commonwealth.
- South Carolina state law vests control of alcoholic beverages exclusively in the power of the state, although counties are permitted to restrict the hours of operation of locations that sell alcohol.
- Utah state law provides that local jurisdictions only may enact alcohol control legislation that does not conflict with state law, thereby precluding the ability of communities to go dry.
- Wyoming state law provides that each local jurisdiction's liquor board must allow liquor licenses.

== Alabama ==
Of the 67 counties in Alabama, none are completely dry, 23 are partially dry or "moist" (these counties contain cities that have voted to allow alcohol sales), and 44 are completely wet. In 2014 the municipalities of Oneonta, Blountsville and Cleveland in Blount County became wet, and in 2016 the municipalities of Ashland and Lineville in Clay County became wet. Within those 23 "moist" counties, 74 city governments have legalized alcohol sales inside their city limits.

- In order for an Alabama city or county to hold a wet-dry vote, 25% of the voters in the preceding general election must sign a petition requesting a vote. A city must have a population in excess of 1,000 residents in order to have a referendum to become wet. Petitions can be made to become wet or dry.

== Alaska ==
- State law allows each village to decide on restrictions, and some boroughs may prohibit it altogether.

Three terms describe Alaskan villages in common usage:

- A "dry village" bans both the sale and possession of alcohol.
- A "wet village" permits both the sale and possession of alcohol.
- A "damp village" permits possession of alcohol but bans the sale of it.

There is wide variation of restrictions placed on the possession and movement of alcohol in the "damp" villages, some villages permit residents to order alcohol from stores outside the ban area and have it shipped in, while other villages require the person owning the alcohol to personally bring the alcohol into their jurisdiction.

== Arkansas ==
- Arkansas has 75 counties, 31 of which are dry or partially dry—southern Logan County and southern Sebastian County are dry. Alcohol sales are generally forbidden statewide on Sundays (packaged liquor, beer and wine sales are currently allowed on Sundays in the cities of Altus, Bentonville, Eureka Springs, Ozark, Rogers, Springdale and Tontitown; additionally, licensed microbreweries can sell growlers for carry-out on Sundays) and on Christmas Day. (Amendment 100 to the Arkansas Constitution allows alcohol to be served in the casino properties every day of the year including Sunday and Christmas.) The issue is more complex than that, however, since any local jurisdiction (county, municipal, etc.) can exercise control over alcohol laws via public referendum. For this reason, some cities like Jacksonville, are dry despite being located in a "wet" county. In Fort Smith the same situation exists but with a wet city existing in an otherwise dry county. A city or municipality can elect to go dry in a wet county, but a city or municipality cannot elect to go wet in a dry county. Occasionally, in counties with two county seats, one district may be wet and the other dry, such as Sebastian and Logan counties.
- Dry counties (with county seat(s) in parentheses): Ashley (Hamburg), Bradley (Warren), Clay (Corning/Piggott), Cleburne (Heber Springs), Craighead (Jonesboro/Lake City), Crawford (Van Buren), Faulkner (Conway), Fulton (Salem), Grant (Sheridan), Hempstead (Hope), Howard (Nashville), Independence (Batesville), Izard (Melbourne), Johnson (Clarksville), Lafayette (Lewisville), Lawrence (Walnut Ridge/Powhatan), Lincoln (Star City), Southern Logan (Booneville), Lonoke (Lonoke), Montgomery (Mt. Ida), Nevada (Prescott), Newton (Jasper), Perry (Perryville), Pike (Murfreesboro), Pope (Russellville), Scott (Waldron), Searcy (Marshall), Southern Sebastian (Greenwood), Stone (Mountain View), White (Searcy), and Yell (Dardanelle/Danville).
- Wet counties (with county seat(s) in parentheses): Arkansas (De Witt/Stuttgart), Baxter (Mountain Home), Benton (Bentonville), Boone (Harrison), Calhoun (Hampton), Carroll (Berryville/Eureka Springs), Chicot (Lake Village), Clark (Arkadelphia), Cleveland (Rison), Columbia (Magnolia), Conway (Morrilton), Crittenden (Marion), Cross (Wynne), Dallas (Fordyce), Desha (Arkansas City), Drew (Monticello), Franklin (Ozark/Charleston), Garland (Hot Springs), Greene (Paragould), Hot Spring (Malvern), Jackson (Newport), Jefferson (Pine Bluff), Lee (Marianna), Little River (Ashdown), Northern Logan (Paris), Madison (Huntsville), Marion (Yellville), Miller (Texarkana), Mississippi (Osceola/Blytheville), Monroe (Clarendon), Ouachita (Camden), Phillips (Helena), Poinsett (Harrisburg), Polk (Mena), Prairie (Des Arc/De Valls Bluff), Pulaski (Little Rock), Randolph (Pocahontas), Saline (Benton), St. Francis (Forrest City), Northern Sebastian (Fort Smith), Sevier (De Queen), Sharp (Ash Flat), Union (El Dorado), Van Buren (Clinton), Washington (Fayetteville), and Woodruff (Augusta).

== Connecticut ==
- In 2014 the last dry town in Connecticut, Bridgewater allowed the sale of alcohol in restaurants. Now Connecticut has three towns considered moist, in addition to Bridgewater, alcohol sales from restaurants and package stores, but not grocery stores. Wilton allows alcohol sales from restaurants and package stores, but not grocery stores, while Eastford only allows restaurants to sell beer and wine.

== Florida ==
There is only one completely dry county in Florida: Liberty County in the Florida Panhandle. Lafayette County in North Central Florida is a partially dry county, as it does allow retail sales of beer.

While most Florida counties and cities are wet, some do have blue laws regulating alcohol sales on Sunday morning.

== Georgia ==
All Georgia counties are fully wet, with the exception of the following:

- Bleckley County prohibits the sale of distilled spirits for retail and on-site consumption.
- Butts County prohibits the sale of distilled spirits for on-site consumption.
- Coweta County, Georgia prohibits the retail sale of distilled spirits.
- Decatur County prohibits the sale of distilled spirits for on-site consumption.
- Dodge County prohibits the retail sale of distilled spirits.
- Effingham County prohibits the retail sale of distilled spirits.
- Hart County prohibits the sale of distilled spirits for retail and on-site consumption.
- Lumpkin County prohibits the retail sale of distilled spirits.
- Murray County prohibits the sale of distilled spirits for retail and on-site consumption.
- Union County prohibits the retail sale of distilled spirits.
- Upson County prohibits the retail sale of distilled spirits. The sale of distilled spirits for on-site consumption was approved by vote in May 2014.
- White County prohibits the sale of distilled spirits for retail and on-site consumption (except for the City of Helen).

== Idaho ==
- Madison County is last moist county in Idaho, prohibiting liquor by the drink.
- Until January 2024 Franklin County in Idaho prohibited liquor by the drink. Preston city inside the county repealed its ban in May.

== Illinois ==
- Individual precincts within the city of Chicago can elect to restrict alcohol sales, whether by the drink or packaged, in binding referendums.
- Edwards County is a dry county, with multiple referendums to allow alcohol sales failing in the mid-1990s. The portion of Grayville that lies within Edwards County does allow alcohol sales per Grayville city ordinance.
- Moweaqua, located in Shelby County, and founded in 1854, was a dry town since origination until March 2014.
- Stewardson, also located in Shelby County, was a dry town from 1910 until 2014, when voters approved alcohol sales.
- The village of South Holland has been a dry municipality since it was founded by Dutch Reformed immigrants in 1894. In accordance with the state liquor law (see overview), South Holland bans the sale of alcohol by not issuing licenses for any business to sell alcohol in the community. In 2023 South Holland issued the first license for a restaurant to sell beer and wine. The possession, consumption and transport of alcohol are all permitted in South Holland. Other municipalities in Illinois' Cook County, such as Oak Park and Evanston, were once dry communities, but have since re-allowed the sale of alcohol, though these municipalities still tend to have tougher regulation on alcohol sales than the rest of the county.
- South Ottawa Township, LaSalle County within Ottawa elected to stay dry after the end of Prohibition; it remained a dry township until this was overturned by a unanimous city council vote in October 2013.

== Kansas ==
Kansas prohibited alcohol from 1881 to 1948, and continued to prohibit bars selling liquor by the drink until 1987. Both the 1948 amendment to the Kansas Constitution that ended prohibition and the 1986 amendment that allowed for open saloons provided that the amendments only would be in effect in counties that had approved the respective amendments, either during the election over the amendment itself or subsequently.

All 105 counties in Kansas have approved the 1948 amendment, but one county (Wallace) has never approved the 1986 amendment, and therefore continues to prohibit any and all sale of liquor by the drink. Public bars (so-called "open saloons") are illegal in this county. Another 64 counties approved the 1986 amendment, but with a requirement that to sell liquor by the drink, an establishment must receive 30% of its gross revenues from food sales. 40 counties in Kansas have fully approved the 1986 amendment without any limitation, allowing liquor to be sold by the drink without any food sales requirement.

== Kentucky ==
(As of February 2020) Of the 120 counties in Kentucky, 11 counties are dry, 53 are wet, and the remaining 56 are either "moist" or dry with special circumstances.

== Maine ==
Maine was the first dry state in the country. As of 2019, 37 towns in Maine remained dry.

== Massachusetts ==
Dry towns in Massachusetts

As of 2013, there were only eight completely dry towns in Massachusetts: Alford, Chilmark, Dunstable, Gosnold, Hawley, Montgomery, Mount Washington, and Westhampton. The number of dry towns has decreased over time: according to the Massachusetts Alcoholic Beverage Control Commission, there were 20 dry towns in Massachusetts in 2000.

== Michigan ==
- Hudsonville voted to allow alcohol sales on November 6, 2007, ending its run as the last dry city in Michigan. Hudsonville's vote follows the precedent of voters in both Zeeland, and Allendale Charter Township, choosing to overturn their bans on alcohol sales to adults age 21 and older in recent years.
- Oak Park had been dry since its establishment in 1945. A vote on July 15, 2013, allows up to 20 restaurants to obtain tavern licenses, but they could not sell spirits or mixed drinks. On May 5, 2015 the citizens of Oak Park voted to allow mixed drinks to be sold at businesses within city limits in addition to beer and wine, which were previously allowed.

== Minnesota ==
- Lakeside-Lester Park, a neighborhood within Duluth, Minnesota, prohibited alcohol sales under a law dating to the late 19th century. An advisory referendum to repeal the prohibition failed by one vote in November 2008. Following a successful referendum in November 2015, the Minnesota Legislature repealed the prohibition in 2016, and the Duluth City Council approved the change on June 27, 2016
- Minnesota prohibited Sunday liquor sales at retail liquor stores until 2017. Legislation efeective July 1, 2017, permitted off-premises liquor sales on Sunday between 11 a.m. and 6 p.m. Under Minnesota law, licensed establishments may also sell alcoholic beverages for on-premises consumption on Sundays, subject to applicable licensing requirements and operating-hour restrictions. Sales of 3.2 malt liquor are permitted at appropriately licensed retailers, including grocery and convenience stores, during specified hours.
- Red Lake Indian Reservation continues to prohibit alcohol sales within the reservation. The prohibition is maintained under tribal policy and appies to reservation lands in parts of Beltrami and Clearwater counties.

== Mississippi ==
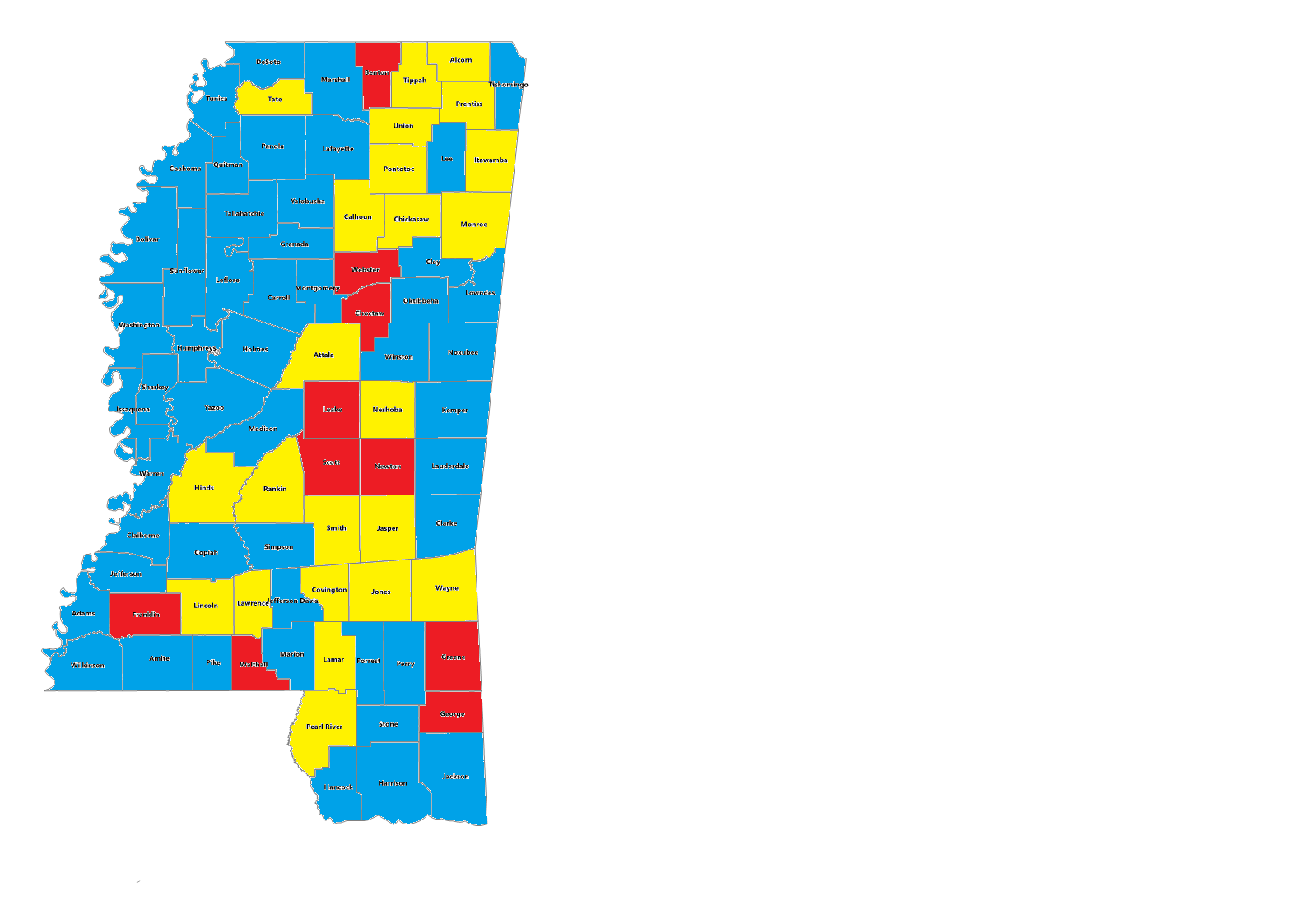
Map showing Dry Counties (red), Dry Counties with Wet Districts/Municipalities/Areas (yellow), and Wet Counties (blue) within Mississippi

As of January 1, 2021, all counties are "wet" by default and allow for the sale of beer and light wine unless they vote to become dry again through a future referendum. However, 16 counties are completely dry with regard to liquor: Benton, Chocktaw, Franklin, George, Greene, Leake, Newton, Scott, Walthall, Webster, Covington, Jones, Wayne, Lincoln, Copiah, Lawrence two counties which are split into dry and wet judicial districts (Hinds and Chickasaw). Covington, Jones and Wayne counties are dry for beer and white wine.

== Nevada ==
- The town of Panaca, Nevada, was southern Nevada's first permanent settlement, founded as a Mormon colony in 1864. It originally was part of Washington County, Utah, but the Congressional redrawing of boundaries in 1866 shifted Panaca into Nevada. It remains Nevada's only dry municipality, only because it is grandfathered into state law.

== New Hampshire ==
According to the New Hampshire Liquor Commission, Ellsworth is the only town to disallow the sale of alcoholic beverages. (Other towns allow sales of alcohol, but with restrictions). The most recent town to go "wet" is Sharon; the town voted to repeal its dry law in 2014.

== New Jersey ==
New Jersey has no dry counties, but as of 2017, at least 30 municipalities (out of 565 statewide) prohibit the retail sale of alcohol. Most of the dry towns are in South Jersey, and some of them are dry because of their origins as Quaker, Methodist, or other Protestant religious communities. Dry towns in New Jersey cannot forbid the possession, consumption, or transportation of alcohol, but have the option to permit or prohibit BYOB at restaurants and social affair permits for non-profit organizations. It is possible for a dry town to have a winery or brewery that offers tastings, since alcohol manufacturing licenses in New Jersey are issued by the state, and are not regulated by municipalities.

- Audubon Park in Camden County
- Cape May Point in Cape May County
- Collingswood in Camden County
- Delanco Township in Burlington County
- Downe Township in Cumberland County
- Elk Township in Gloucester County
- Elmer in Salem County
- Far Hills in Somerset County
- Haddonfield in Camden County
- Haddon Heights in Camden County
- Interlaken in Monmouth County
- Island Heights in Ocean County
- Lawrence Township in Cumberland County
- Lower Alloways Creek Township in Salem County
- Mannington Township in Salem County
- Mantoloking in Ocean County
- Maurice River Township in Cumberland County
- Ocean City in Cape May County
- Ocean Grove in Monmouth County
- Oldmans Township in Salem County
- Pemberton in Burlington County
- Pitman in Gloucester County
- Port Republic in Atlantic County
- Prospect Park in Passaic County
- Quinton Township in Salem County
- Riverton in Burlington County
- Saddle River in Bergen County
- Shiloh in Cumberland County
- South Harrison Township in Gloucester County
- Stow Creek Township in Cumberland County
- Upper Deerfield Township in Cumberland County
- Upper Pittsgrove Township in Salem County
- Wenonah in Gloucester County
- Wildwood Crest in Cape May County

== New Mexico ==
New Mexico doesn't have any dry counties. In 2019 last two counties voted to allow alcohol sales:

- Curry County used to be dry except for the city of Clovis
- Roosevelt County used to be dry except for the city of Portales

== New York ==
- As of the 2019 election, there are eight towns in New York state that are completely dry, and 39 that are partially dry.
- The "dry" towns in the state are: Caneadea in Allegany County, Clymer in Chautauqua County, Lapeer in Cortland County, Orwell in Oswego County, Fremont and Jasper in Steuben County, Berkshire in Tioga County.
- The town of West Almond does not allow off-premises consumption, while the towns of Harford, Franklin, Seneca, Caton, Rathbone, Newark Valley, Butler, Rose, Pike, Wethersfield and Middlesex do not allow on-premises consumption.
- The towns of Bovina, Gorham, Richford, Orangeville, and Barrington do not allow on-premises consumption except in year-round hotels.
- The other 22 partially dry towns have varying specific rules for "Special On-Premises Consumption". For example, Wilmington in Essex County is dry for on-premises consumption at race tracks and outdoor athletic fields and stadiums where admission fees are charged and wet in all other areas.

== North Carolina ==
- North Carolina does not allow alcohol sales between 2 and 7 a.m. Monday through Saturday or before 10 a.m. on Sundays. In June 2017, NC allowed each municipality or county (for unincorporated areas) to start allowing alcohol sales prior to noon on Sundays. Raleigh and Carrboro were the first two cities to enact the 10 a.m. Sunday alcohol sales.
- Several of North Carolina's 100 counties are considered "dry". Individual towns may pass ordinances (via referendum) that may allow alcohol sales within the municipal limits, however, even if the county itself is dry. Most counties, such as Wake and Mecklenburg, allow alcohol sales of any type anywhere in the county, eliminating the potential need for any town or city within its boundary to do so.
- Town and city ordinances concerning alcohol sales may be more liberal than the county's, but may not be more restrictive.

== Ohio ==
- The city of Westerville, Ohio, was dry for more than a century. Once the home of the Anti-Saloon League and called the "dry capital of the world", the first legal drink in recent times was served in 2006.
- The village of Bethel in Clermont County has been dry since the repeal of prohibition. Recently, through use of the single precinct vote system, precincts A and C can now sell (but not serve) alcohol. The business must first be put onto the ballot and voted to allow alcohol to be sold.
- Cortland was a dry town until 2002.
- Lawrence County is dry but individual towns can choose to allow sales of alcohol.
- Hartville, was a dry village, but is no longer dry as of 2013.
- Albany is a dry town.
- Adams County besides Manchester and Green Township are dry. Recently, through use of the single precinct vote system, a precinct in Seaman and Peebles can now sell (but not serve) alcohol.
- Although Scioto County and Portsmouth are not completely dry, Green Township, including Franklin Furnace, is dry.

== Oregon ==
- Throughout the state, beer, wine, wine coolers, malt liquor and similar beverages may be purchased in a convenience store, grocery store and similar outlets. Sales of "hard" liquor for off-premises consumption, are restricted to state-controlled outlets called liquor stores, the stores themselves are owned & operated by independent contractors, however the liquor itself is owned by the Oregon Liquor and Cannabis Commission. Hard liquor can also be sold as well at bars, or restaurants that include a bar, but only in single-drink amounts for on-site consumption; though bars and restaurants that have a bar with a full on-premises, commercial license are allowed to sell beer, wine and malt liquor for off-premises consumption. However restaurants without a bar, which only have a limited on-premises license, can only serve alcohol like beer, wine & malt liquor, for consumption inside the establishment. As such, there are relatively few stand-alone liquor stores in Oregon (for example, as of March 3, 2025, there were only 77 stand-alone liquor stores in the Portland metropolitan area, which has a 2025 population of 2,265,000) and 282 stores in the entire state, which had a population of 4,272,371 in 2024. Oregon also has taverns that sell beer and wine only. All outlets selling "hard" liquor are subject to the rules and regulations of the state-run Oregon Liquor and Cannabis Commission (OLCC). By law, any establishment wishing to sell any alcoholic beverage in the state, for on-site consumption, must also offer food for sale, including bars, taverns, music venues, fairs & festivals, and strip clubs. Oregon law also limits the hours at which alcohol may be sold, between 7:00 A.M. - 2:30 A.M.; liquor stores face additional restrictions and are required to be open at least eight hours a day (except on Sundays), they must be open between 12:00 P.M. & 6:00 P.M., but cannot open any earlier than 7:00 A.M. or close any later than 10:00 P.M.. Other establishments that sell or serve alcohol are only allowed to do so between 7:00 A.M. - 2:30 A.M., and stores selling alcohol that are open past 2:30 A.M., like 24-hour convenience or grocery stores, must store alcoholic beverages in closed display cases, with the doors locked between 2:30 A.M. - 7:00 A.M. Oregon began restricting alcohol hours of sale due to studies showing that it can reduce excessive alcohol consumption and increase public safety by reducing the number intoxicated drives in busy early morning traffic when many people are driving to work. Oregon is one of 18 states that directly control the sales of alcohol beverages in the U.S.

== Rhode Island ==
There are no dry towns left in Rhode Island. Barrington was the sole "dry" town in Rhode Island until 2011, when the town council approved two liquor stores.

== Pennsylvania ==
- The state has a number of dry municipalities, but no dry counties.
- In Pennsylvania, sales of alcoholic beverages were prohibited in convenience stores until 2017.
- Beer, wine and spirits are available for on-premises consumption at bars, taverns and restaurants; no single bottles or cans can be sold to drink off-premises.
- Unopened six- and twelve-packs of beer, and single units of certain larger sizes (i.e., 22- and 40-ounce bottles) can be sold "to-go" by bars, taverns, and certain restaurants. Though convenience and grocery stores broadly cannot sell beer or malt liquor, some have created attached "cafe" areas that, though enclosed by the store, are legally separate, allowing them to sell beer.
- Bars, taverns, etc., can only sell a limited quantity of beer in a single transaction. Cases and kegs of beer are sold only by state-licensed independent beer distributors.
- Spirits are only available in state owned/operated liquor stores. See the Pennsylvania Liquor Control Board.
- Bottles of wine are available in state owned/operated liquor stores, as well as certain grocery stores.
- Independent producers may be exempt in certain ways

== South Carolina ==
- South Carolina does not allow the retail sale of alcohol for off-premises consumption on Sundays. Counties and cities can permit beer and wine sales, however, if the citizens vote for them in a referendum. Twelve counties currently allow Sunday beer and wine sales: Anderson, Richland, Georgetown, Charleston, Beaufort, Greenville, Horry, Berkeley, Dorchester, Newberry, Pickens County Kershaw, Lancaster, and York. Sumter County voted for and passed beer and wine sales on Sundays in November 2020. Cities and towns that have passed laws allowing Sunday beer and wine sales include Anderson, Columbia, Lexington, Spartanburg, Greenville, Travelers Rest, Mauldin, Aiken, Rock Hill, Summerville, Santee, Daniel Island, Tega Cay, Hardeeville, Winnsboro, and Walterboro.

== South Dakota ==
- Oglala Lakota County (which is located entirely within the Pine Ridge Indian Reservation) is a dry county.

== Tennessee ==
1 of Tennessee's 95 counties are completely dry:

- Hancock County
- The consolidated city-county government of Lynchburg and Moore County, Tennessee, is partially a dry county, despite being home to the Jack Daniel's distillery.

While Moore County itself had been completely dry, the County now allows the sale of commemorative bottles of Jack in the White Rabbit Bottle Shop, and one can take part in a sampling tour at the distillery. It is also now possible to sample wine, rum, vodka and whiskey in shops where it is distilled on premises, and beer is also available in local food establishments when served with a meal.

- Blount, Crockett, Sevier, Stewart, and Weakley are considered moist counties. Some municipalities within these counties allow sales of liquor-by-the-drink and retail package stores.

== Texas ==
Of Texas' 254 counties, 3 (Borden, Kent, and Roberts) are completely dry, 196 are partially dry, and 55 are entirely wet. The vast majority of entirely wet counties are in southern border regions of Texas near Mexico, or in the south central portion.

Alcohol law in Texas varies significantly by location. In some counties, 4% beer is legal. In others, beverages that are 14% or less alcohol are legal. In some "dry" areas, a customer can get a mixed drink by paying to join a "private club", and in some "wet" areas a customer needs a club membership to purchase liquor by-the-drink. "...Move to Burleson, which has alcohol sales in the Tarrant County portion of the city but not in the Johnson County side of town." Today beer and wine can be purchased in all parts of Burleson. The only places in the county where liquor can be purchased are a couple of stores inside the city limits of Alvarado and Rio Vista. Hemphill County voters changed the county from being dry to moist in November 2020.

A bill passed in 2003 by the Texas Legislature allows for Justice of the Peace precincts to host alcohol option elections. To date, this law has allowed many JP precincts, particularly in East Texas, to allow a vote that has resulted in many previously dry counties becoming "moist" and allowing sales of beer and wine, but not liquor.

Texas law prohibits off-premises sale of liquor (but not beer and wine) all day on Sunday, Thanksgiving Day, Christmas Day, and New Year's Day. Off-premises sale of beer and wine on Sunday is only allowed from 10:01 am onward.

Texas law also prohibits the sale of alcohol in any "sexually oriented business" in a dry county. Strip clubs in these dry counties often sell "set ups" (a cup with soda, ice, and a stirrer to which one can add their own alcohol) and have a BYOB policy to allow patrons to bring their own alcohol into the establishment.

== Utah ==
As of September 2018 there are 9 cities where alcoholic beverages cannot be purchased.

- Aneth, San Juan County. Possession, manufacture, or delivery of alcoholic beverages prohibited.
- Aurora, Sevier County
- Blanding, San Juan County. Sale of alcoholic beverages prohibited since 1967.
- Hatch, Garfield County
- Highland, Utah County
- Holden, Millard County
- Navajo Mountain, San Juan County Possession, manufacture, or delivery of alcoholic beverages prohibited.
- Scipio, Millard County
- White Mesa, San Juan County

== Vermont ==
- Addison, Albany, Corinth, Granby, Groton, Lincoln, Monkton, Pomfret, Rupert, Topsham, Tunbridge, Vershire, Waterville, Wells, Wolcott, and Worcester towns ban the sale of liquors.
- Baltimore, Vermont is the last fully dry town
- Maidstone voted to become wet in 2020, and Athens in 2024 Holland in 2019

== Virginia ==
Since 2020 there are no dry counties in Virginia, with legislation allowing sales in all areas, unless new opt-outs are voted in by a referendum.

Beer and wine sales are legal in all of Virginia. Of the 95 counties in Virginia, nine (Bland, Buchanan, Charlotte, Craig, Grayson, Highland, Lee, Patrick) were dry as of 2014 in that retail sale of distilled spirits was prohibited. Virginia cities are not subject to county alcohol laws as they are independent by state law, and all Virginia cities are wet. Virginia also restricts the sale of hard liquors (or distilled spirits) to retail stores operated by the Virginia Alcoholic Beverage Control Authority. This setup is unusual in that the state agency is not only responsible for the sale of liquor, but also for the enforcement of alcohol-related laws in addition to public education campaigns. These campaigns are generally geared toward young adults not of drinking age, but also cover topics such as substance abuse, training for hospitality industry employees, and cautioning of the dangers of mixing alcohol and medications.

== Washington ==
- The city of Fircrest was the last dry community on the west coast of the contiguous 48 states. Voters chose to allow the sale of alcohol by the glass in Fircrest in the 3 November 2015 election.
- The Yakama Nation prohibits the sale of alcohol on the Yakama Indian Reservation.
- The city of College Place allows sale of alcohol in stores, but has no taverns or cocktail lounges.
- The Makah Tribe prohibits the sale or possession of alcohol on the Makah Reservation.

== Wisconsin ==
- Richland Center and Port Edwards were dry for decades, but bars opened in both communities in 1994 after changes to local ordinances.
- The city of Sparta is the largest community in Wisconsin that restricts beer and liquor sales to taverns and restaurants that have an on-premises consumption license. Grocery and convenience stores cannot sell beer and liquor there. The community abolished Class A licenses for retail sales in 1966 through referendum, when a local liquor store owner in the city objected to a grocery store's application for a class A license. Referendums were defeated in 1982, 1986, 1992, 2005, 2007, 2009, and 2011 for class A licenses. Opposition to Class A licenses in the community is widely believed to be from the liquor store owner(s), who locate on the border of the city in neighboring towns that allow Class A licenses. Local opposition from these liquor stores is also widely believed to be a monopolistic motivation to protect their business trade by restricting it in Sparta. On April 7, 2009, in the Wisconsin 2009 spring general election, voters defeated the referendum questions about changing restrictions on the beer and liquor sales in Sparta, for the sixth time. In the April 5, 2011 Wisconsin spring election, Sparta voted for the seventh time not to change restrictions on the sale of beer and liquor in the city. In the April 1, 2014 Wisconsin spring election, the voters narrowly approved the sale of wine and beer in groceries and convenience stores. Liquor sales remain banned in the city.
- On the April 5, 2016, voters in Ephraim passed a referendum to allow the sale of beer and wine in restaurants and businesses.

== Indian reservations ==
Indian reservations are generally exempted from state and local laws and allowed to enact their own alcohol policies.

Tribes prohibiting sale of alcohol:

- Crow Indian Reservation, Montana
- Northern Cheyenne Indian Reservation, Montana
- Pine Ridge Indian Reservation, South Dakota
- Red Lake Indian Reservation
- Makah Reservation
- Yakama Indian Reservation
- Navajo Nation
- Hopi Nation
- Havasupai Reservation, Arizona
- Zuni Indian Reservation, New Mexico

Tribes allowing alcohol in restricted localities:

- Wind River Indian Reservation, Wyoming (allowed between 1972 – late 1970s, prohibition late 1970s – 2023, since 2023 only allowed in Wind River Hotel for guests)
- Fort Hall Reservation, Idaho (only allowed in the Shoshone-Bannock Casino Hotel)
- Tohono Oʼodham Nation, Arizona (allowed at Desert Diamond casino since 2017)

Tribes allowing alcohol in some localities:

- Fort Apache Indian Reservation, Arizona (beer and wine allowed at some stores and resorts)

Tribes allowing alcohol sales:

- Fort Berthold Reservation, North Dakota (since 1955)
- Standing Rock Sioux Tribe (since 1973)
- Blackfeet Tribe, Montana (since 1954)
- Cheyenne River Sioux (since 1953)
- Confederated Colville Tribes, Washington (since 1953)
- Flathead Reservation, Montana (since 1960)
- Warm Springs Indian Reservation, Oregon (since 1971)
- Walker River Reservation, Nevada (1963–64, since 1966)
- Pyramid Lake Paiute Tribe Reservation, Nevada (since 1960)
- Nez Perce Reservation, Idaho (since 1971)
- Turtle Mountain Reservation, North Dakota (since 1973)
- Menominee Indian Reservation, Wisconsin (since 1959)
- Lac du Flambeau Reservation, Wisconsin (since 1973)
- Minnesota Chippewa Tribe (since 1953)
- Mescalero Reservation, New Mexico (since 1965)
- Cochiti Pueblo, New Mexico (since 1966)
- Southern Ute Indian Reservation, Colorado (since 1970)
- Jicarilla Apache Nation Reservation, New Mexico (since 1962)
- Hualapai Indian Reservation, Arizona (since 1969)
- San Carlos Reservation, Arizona (since 1965)
- Colorado River Indian Reservation, Arizona (since 1960)
- Uintah and Ouray Reservation, Utah (since 1955)
