= Alcohol laws of Kansas =

Map showing dry (red), wet (blue), and mixed (yellow) counties in the United States as of May 2025.

Location of Kansas

The alcohol laws of Kansas are among the strictest in the United States, in sharp contrast to its neighboring state of Missouri (see Alcohol laws of Missouri), and similar to (though somewhat less rigid than) its other neighboring state of Oklahoma (see Alcohol laws of Oklahoma). Legislation is enforced by the Kansas Division of Alcoholic Beverage Control.

Kansas had statewide prohibition from 1881 to 1948, longer than any other state, and continued to prohibit general on-premises liquor sales until 1987. Kansas's strict and highly regulated approach to alcohol stems from lingering vestiges of its long era of prohibition. As of March 2023, Kansas has one dry county, Wallace County, where on-premises liquor sales are prohibited, but the sale of 3.2% beer is permitted. As of April 2017, Kansas still has not ratified the Twenty-first Amendment to the U.S. Constitution, which ended nationwide prohibition in 1933.

== History of liquor laws in Kansas ==
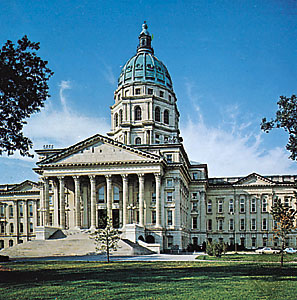
The Kansas State Capitol in Topeka.

=== Statewide prohibition of alcohol (1881–1948) ===
The 19th century temperance movement in Kansas was strengthened by several factors. Many Puritans immigrated to the territory; the saloons were only open to men, which led to them being perceived as divisive in the family; and in Kansas the temperance movement also became associated with the movement to abolish slavery. Before statewide legislation prohibiting the sale of alcohol came into being, several Kansas towns including Topeka, Emporia, and Baldwin, enacted local liquor laws, which for instance made the sale of alcohol at any commercial property illegal.

In 1880, Kansas voters approved an amendment to the Kansas Constitution prohibiting all manufacture and sale of "intoxicating liquors" throughout the state effective January 1, 1881, making Kansas the first state in the United States to enact a statewide constitutional prohibition on alcohol, and heralding Kansas's long era of statewide prohibition. Kansas was a national center of activity of the temperance movement. Carrie A. Nation, born in Kentucky and spending much of her life in Missouri, moved to Kansas with her second husband in 1889, where she became famous for advocating enforcement of the Kansas Constitution's prohibition of alcohol.

Nationwide prohibition went into effect with ratification of the Eighteenth Amendment to the United States Constitution in 1919, lasting until repeal by the Twenty-first Amendment in 1933. During this period, alcohol was prohibited in Kansas by both state and federal law. In 1934, shortly after the end of nationwide prohibition, a proposal was put to referendum that Kansas end its statewide prohibition, and regulate and tax liquor instead. Voters rejected it by a sizable margin.

The prohibition amendment allowed the Kansas Legislature to define what constituted "intoxicating liquor". So in 1937, the legislature passed a law defining beer with an alcohol content of 3.2% or less by weight as cereal malt beverage, or "CMB," thereby excluding CMB from the definition of "intoxicating liquor". The new law also authorized sale of CMB for both on- and off-premises consumption throughout the state.

In 1948, voters approved an amendment to the Kansas Constitution authorizing the legislature to "regulate, license and tax the manufacture and sale of intoxicating liquor ... regulate the possession and transportation of intoxicating liquor." The amendment also deemed the open saloon "forever prohibited". This meant that package (off-premises) liquor sales could be authorized and regulated, but that the prohibition of sale by the drink in public places (on-premises) continued.

=== Prohibition of by-the-drink sale (1948–1987) ===
After the 1948 Amendment, the Legislature enacted the Liquor Control Act, which authorized off-premises sale in counties which had approved the 1948 Amendment, subject to a system of regulating, licensing, and taxing those sales. The Division of Alcoholic Beverage Control, or ABC, was created to enforce the Act.

In 1965, the Legislature enacted laws permitting the sale of liquor in private clubs. Clubs were exempt from the constitutional prohibition because they were not open to the public. In 1970, voters rejected a proposal to repeal the constitutional prohibition on open saloons. In 1979, the Legislature permitted on-premises sales of liquor by the drink in private clubs, leading many existing CMB saloons to start selling liquor but charge the consumer a one-time "membership fee".

In the 1970s, Kansas Attorney General Vern Miller renewed the enforcement of Kansas's prohibition, even raiding Amtrak trains traveling through Kansas to stop illegal liquor sales. He also forced airlines to stop serving liquor while traveling through Kansas airspace. After 2005, it is likely that these restrictions would be found unconstitutional under the Supreme Court's decision in Granholm v. Heald, 544 U.S. 460 (2005).

Finally, in 1986, the electorate voted to repeal the prohibition on open saloons in Kansas, effective January 1, 1987. The Legislature thereafter amended the Liquor Control Act to regulate and license sales of alcohol in bars in any county which had approved the 1986 Amendment or did so subsequently and only in towns with a population greater than 11,000 (lowered to 5,000 in 2000). Sunday sale of liquor was prohibited, but Sunday sale of CMB was permitted in restaurants deriving more than 30% of their profits from food. All of these new establishments and allowances were subject to a 10% "drink tax". Grocery stores were prohibited from selling any liquor besides 3.2% ABW beer.

=== Further loosening of restrictions (2003–present) ===
In 2003, the District Court of Wyandotte County ruled that the ban on Sunday liquor sales was unconstitutional because it did not apply uniformly to all communities. The Kansas Supreme Court upheld the ruling. By then, two counties and 23 cities had adopted laws permitting Sunday liquor sales. Effective November 15, 2005, the Legislature amended the Liquor Control Act to permit cities and counties to allow Sunday liquor sales. Sales are prohibited on Easter, Thanksgiving, and Christmas. Since June 2012, bars are able to offer happy-hour specials after more than 25 years of being able to reduce prices only if they'd done so for the entire day. Liquor stores are able to offer unlimited free samples of beer, wine and liquor. And the growing business of microdistilleries is freed to produce up to 50,000 gallons of liquor a year, offer free samples and sell bottles of their product, much as microbreweries have done. Oenophiles have some new options too. Farm wineries are able to offer samples and sell their products at their farms and at special events, such as the Midwest Winefest in April where vineyards previously could offer samples but had to direct customers to their farms or the Internet to buy a bottle or case of vino. Finally, the state has defined Kansas wine: one that has at least 30 percent of ingredients grown in-state. On April 1, 2019, Senate Bill 13 went into effect allowing CMB (cereal malt beverage) retail stores to sell beer 6% alcohol by volume or less.

== Liquor sales ==
Kansas law divides alcohol into six categories, each of which is regulated differently. "Alcoholic liquor" includes spirits, wine, and beer containing over 3.2% alcohol by weight; spirits are defined as any distilled alcoholic beverage, including brandy, rum, whiskey, and gin, among others. A "cereal malt beverage" is beer containing less than 3.2% alcohol by weight. A "nonalcoholic malt beverage" is beer containing less than 0.5% alcohol by weight. "Domestic table wine" is wine containing 14% or less alcohol by volume, manufactured by farm wineries in Kansas from products grown in Kansas. "Domestic fortified wine" is wine containing between 14% and 20% alcohol by volume, similarly made in Kansas. "Domestic beer" is beer containing 8% or less alcohol by weight and is manufactured by microbreweries from Kansas-grown agricultural products.

Regulations governing liquor sale and taxation are enforced by the ABC. It has broad rule-making authority. All liquor sales are subject to a 10% "drink tax" on gross receipts of any business which sells liquor, either as a distributor, off-premises, or on-premises.

Kansas lifted the ban on the importation of alcohol from other states other than by a licensed distributor in 2009. Before this, it was illegal for private citizens to order beer, wine, or liquor from out of state breweries or wineries, including by telephone, internet, and mail order.

=== Distribution ===
Kansas has a three-tier liquor distribution system. That is, alcohol subject to control is distributed from manufacturer to distributor to retailer. The only exceptions are that farm wineries and microbreweries may sell directly to the consumer, and establishments may purchase beer and bulk wine directly from wholesalers.

=== Off-premises ===
Off-premises liquor sales are only allowed in licensed liquor stores. Grocery stores and gas stations may sell CMB. Retail liquor stores are licensed by the state, and CMB retailers are licensed by the city or county.

==== Retail liquor stores ====
A retail liquor store licensee must have been a United States citizen for 10 years, a resident of Kansas for 4 years, must never have been convicted of a felony, a crime of moral turpitude, a liquor law violation, must never have had a prior license revocation, must be 21 years of age, must not be in the business of law enforcement, and the licensee's spouse must meet the same qualifications. Retail liquor stores may sell beer, wine, spirits, and nonalcoholic malt beverages. They may be licensed CMB retailers as well.

Sales are prohibited on Memorial Day, Independence Day, Labor Day, Easter, Thanksgiving and Christmas unless the local unit of government has voted to allow Sunday Sales. If Sunday Sales are allowed, sales are prohibited only on Easter Sunday, Christmas and Thanksgiving. Sales are prohibited between 11:00 PM and 9:00 AM. Cities and counties which allow off-premises sales are prohibited from allowing Sunday liquor sales after 8:00 PM, but may not require retail liquor stores to close before 8:00 PM on other days. No sales are allowed at less than cost. All employees must be at least 21 years of age.

A retail liquor store must be in an area zoned for commercial use, cannot be located within 200 feet (61 m) of a school, college, or church, and cannot have an indoor entrance or an opening which connects with another business. Except for Kansas Lottery tickets (which incidentally can be sold to 18-year-olds), cigarettes, or tobacco products, liquor stores can now sell any products as long as they do not exceed more than 20% of the retailer's gross sales. It may not provide any entertainment, including pinball machines. A prohibition against offering customers free samples of liquor was repealed as of July 1, 2012.

==== CMB (Cereal Malt Beverage) retailers ====
A CMB licensee must be a United States citizen, must have been a resident of Kansas for one year, must have been a resident of the county in which the business is located for six months, must not have had a felony conviction in the preceding two years, must never have had a conviction for a crime of moral turpitude, drunkenness, DUI, or any liquor violation, must be at least 21 years of age, and the licensee's spouse must meet the same qualifications. CMB retailers may sell cereal malt beverages or nonalcoholic malt beverages.

Sales are prohibited between midnight and 6:00 AM. Sales are allowed at less than cost. All employees must be at least 18 years of age. Cities and counties regulate the locations at which CMB retailers may not be located.

=== On-premises ===
As discussed above, Kansas did not allow public on-premises liquor sales from 1881 to 1987. Except in private clubs, liquor by the drink in 2013 is specifically prohibited except where voters have approved its sale. The 1986 constitutional amendment which allowed liquor by the drink authorized the Legislature to provide for liquor by the drink in establishments that derive 30% or more of gross receipts from the sale of food. If a county did not approve the amendment, it can hold a subsequent county referendum in which voters may: (1) prohibit liquor by the drink in that county; (2) remove the minimum food sale requirement; or (3) permit liquor by the drink in places that meet the 30% minimum food sale requirement.

As of August 2, 2023, Wallace County is the last which has never approved the 1986 amendment and therefore continues to prohibit any and all sale of liquor by the drink. On-premises sales are illegal in Wallace County. Sixty other counties have approved the 1986 amendment with the food sales requirement. Forty-four counties have approved the 1986 amendment without limitation and allow liquor to be sold by the drink on-premises without any food sales requirement. The counties which are entirely "wet" include most of those with Kansas's larger cities, such as Douglas, where Lawrence and the University of Kansas are located, Sedgwick, where Wichita is located, Shawnee, where Topeka is located, Wyandotte, where Kansas City is located, and Johnson County, the largest county in Kansas and the largest Kansas portion of the Kansas City Metropolitan Area. The counties which are home to Fort Riley, a large United States Army base, Geary and Riley, are also totally wet. Riley County's seat, Manhattan, is home to the state's other large college campus, Kansas State University. Several rural counties have now approved on-premises sales without the food requirement, including Stanton County, which was dry into 2023.

In those counties which allow liquor to be sold on-premises by the drink, clubs and drinking establishments may sell beer, wine, spirits, nonalcoholic malt beverages, and cereal malt beverages any day, but not between 2 AM and 9 AM. Drinks "on the house" are prohibited. No sales are allowed at less than cost. "All you can drink" promotions are prohibited. Drinks cannot be offered as prizes. Free food and entertainment are permitted. Employees must be at least 21 years of age to mix and dispense drinks, and must be at least 18 years of age to serve drinks. A prohibition against limited drink specials, such as "happy hours" or "ladies' nights", was repealed as of July 1, 2012. To go alcohol beverage sales by those with on-premises licenses, originally allowed due to the COVID-19 pandemic, are now permitted till 11pm "as long as the drinks are in tamper-evident packaging".

== Open container ==
Open containers of alcohol are prohibited outside of private buildings and licensed on-premises alcohol sellers. An open container is prohibited inside any motor vehicle, unless it is a licensed limousine or mass-transit vehicle.

Kansas's open container law meets the requirements of the federal Transportation Equity Act for the 21st Century for prohibiting open containers in vehicles.

== DUI ==
Like every other state (except New Jersey and Wisconsin, where it is classified as a lesser traffic offense) in the United States, driving under the influence is a crime in Kansas, and is subject to a great number of regulations outside of the Liquor Control Act. Kansas's maximum blood alcohol level for driving is .08% for persons over the age of 21 and .02% for adults under the age of 21 and minors.

Ordinarily, DUI is a misdemeanor in Kansas, although the third DUI conviction becomes a felony. Refusal to take a chemical test (i.e. breathalyzer) when so requested by a law enforcement officer who has probable cause will result in a one-year suspension of the suspect's driver's license.

If the key is in the ignition, the driver could get a DUI.

== Drinking age ==
In response to the National Minimum Drinking Age Act in 1984, which reduced by 10% the federal highway funding of any state which did not have a minimum drinking age of 21, the Kansas Legislature raised the drinking age from 18 to 21, effective January 1, 1985. Previously, the drinking age for CMB was 18. Persons under 21 are prohibited from purchasing or possessing any type of alcohol, from consuming alcohol for anything other than religious or prescribed medicinal purposes, or from having a blood alcohol level of more than .02%. There is exception for parents wishing to provide their own child CMB under K.S.A. 41-727(e).

== See also ==
- List of dry communities by U.S. state
- Alcohol laws of the United States
- Low-point beer
- Sumptuary law
- History of Kansas
