= Oklahoma Beer Act of 1933 (US) =

United States public law

- Long title: An Act to legalize the manufacture, sale, or possession of 3.2 per centum beer in the State of Oklahoma when and if the same is legalized by a majority vote of the people of Oklahoma or by act of the Legislature of the State of Oklahoma.
- Nicknames: Oklahoma Beer Permit Act
- Enacted by: the 73rd United States Congress
- Effective: June 16, 1933

Citations
- Public law: Pub. L. 73–82
- Statutes at Large: 48 Stat. 311, Chapter CV

Codification
- Titles amended: 27 U.S.C.: Intoxicating Liquors
- U.S.C. sections created: 27 U.S.C. ch. 2A § 64p

Legislative history
- Introduced in the House as H.R. 5690 by William Wirt Hastings (D-OK) on May 22, 1933; Committee consideration by House Judiciary, Senate Judiciary; Passed the House on May 29, 1933 (Passed); Passed the Senate on June 7, 1933 (Passed); Signed into law by President Franklin D. Roosevelt on June 16, 1933

Oklahoma Beer Act of 1933 is a United States public law legalizing the manufacture, possession, and sale of low-point beer in the State of Oklahoma. The Act of Congress cites the federal statute is binding with the cast of legal votes by the State of Oklahoma constituents or legislative action by the Oklahoma Legislature.

== Abolishment of Prohibition Era ==
The Chapter 105 article found in volume forty-eight of the Statutes at Large was enacted into law with the Blaine Act and Cullen-Harrison Act. The beer taxation laws provided tax revenue for the relief of the 1930s financial crisis charged by the Roosevelt Administration's fiscal policy of the United States.

The 72nd United States Congress proposed the Twenty-first Amendment to the United States Constitution as endorsed by John Nance Garner and Charles Curtis on February 20, 1933. The Eighteenth Amendment to the United States Constitution or Volstead Act was repealed upon ratifying the twenty-first constitutional law abolishing Prohibition in the United States on December 5, 1933.

On August 27, 1935, the Beer, Ale, Porter, and Similar Fermented Liquor codified law sections were officially repealed with the enactment of the Liquor Law Repeal and Enforcement Act of 1935.

== Oklahoma Prohibition Law of 1959 ==
Beginning on November 10, 1958, the Oklahoma electoral precincts endorsed a referendum known as the Oklahoma Alcoholic Beverages Initiative Petition No. 264. The ballot appeal was subject for confirmation and consideration by the Governor of Oklahoma Raymond Gary prior to departing the Oklahoma Governor's office on January 12, 1959.

After approval by Oklahoma Governor Howard Edmondson and 27th Oklahoma Legislature on March 3, 1959, the state of Oklahoma convened a state-wide election regarding the wholesale and retail sales of an alcoholic drink prohibiting Oklahoma as an alcoholic beverage control state. On April 7, 1959, Oklahoma registered 711,225 cast votes repealing the Oklahoma alcohol control and prohibition law. The Oklahoma constituents decisively defeated the alcohol law by a vote of 396,845 to 314,380.

The Oklahoma election approved the distributive sales of packaged containers as original unopened alcoholic beverages merchandised by beer stores and liquor stores. The Oklahoma state statute created the Oklahoma Alcoholic Beverage Control Board administering the alcohol beverage regulations and open container laws of Oklahoma.

== Oklahoma Alcoholic Beverage Control Board and Oklahoma Court Cases ==
Associated Legal Proceedings & Oklahoma Alcoholic Beverage Board
- Text of Lambert v. State, 353 P.2d 150 (1960) is available from: CourtListener Justia Casemine
- Text of Oliver v. Oklahoma Alcoholic Beverage Control Board, 359 P.2d 183 (1961) is available from: CourtListener Justia Casemine
- Text of Oklahoma Alcoholic Beverage Control Board v. Lobo, 391 P.2d 819 (1964) is available from: CourtListener Justia Anylaw
- Text of Oklahoma Alcoholic Beverage Control Board v. Milam, 393 P.2d 823 (1964) is available from: CourtListener Justia Casemine
- Text of Oklahoma Alcoholic Beverage Control Board v. Welch, 446 P.2d 268 (1968) is available from: CourtListener Justia Casemine
- Text of Wright v. Oklahoma Alcoholic Beverage Control Board, 516 P.2d 245 (1973) is available from: CourtListener Justia Casemine

== In popular culture ==
During the early 1920s, American Authors Guild recognized the flamboyant and promiscuous lifestyles of the flapper's era as the Jazz Age produced the musical and social harmony of the Roaring Twenties. American literary writers, as Ernest Hemingway and Gertrude Stein ― 27 rue de Fleurus ― defined the early twentieth century generational and social advocates as the Lost Generation of the temperance movement.

◇ Flappers and Philosophers (1920)	◇ The Beautiful and Damned (1922)
◇ Main Street (1920)	◇ Many Marriages (1923)
◇ This Side of Paradise (1920)	◇ Dark Laughter (1925)
◇ Babbitt (1922)	◇ The Great Gatsby (1925)

By the early 1930s, the Cinema of the United States vigilantly cultivated the American charm for the dissolute social norms and the cunning Speakeasy subculture of the alcohol prohibition era.

☆ The Struggle (1931)	☆ Once Upon a Time in America (1984)
☆ The Wet Parade (1932)	☆ Prohibition (2011)
☆ Song of the Eagle (1933)	☆ Lawless (2012)
☆ What! No Beer? (1933)	☆ The Great Gatsby (Film Adaptations)
☆ The Roaring Twenties (1939)	☆ The Great Gatsby (2013)

== See also ==
Alcohol laws of Oklahoma
Alcohol packaging warning messages
Anti-Saloon League
Association Against the Prohibition Amendment
Beer chemistry
Beer in the United States
Bottled in bond
Carrie Nation
Dry county
Dry state
Dust Bowl
Great Depression
Local option
National Beer Day (United States)
New Deal
Repeal of Prohibition in the United States
United States Brewers' Association
Wickersham Commission

== Historical Bibliography ==
- "1909–1913 National Bulletin". HathiTrust Digital Library. Ohio: National Wholesale Liquor Dealers Association of America. 1909.
- Ziegler, G.A.; Rommell, W.E.; Herz, G. (1911). Prohibition and Anti-Prohibition. New York: Broadway Publishing. hdl:2027/uc1.$b268713. OCLC 5930387.
- "1915–1918 The Anti-Prohibition Manual: A Summary of Facts and Figures Dealing with Prohibition". HathiTrust Digital Library. Ohio: National Assoc. of Distillers and Wholesale Dealers ~ U.S. Publicity Depart.: 4 v.
- "The Anti-Prohibition Manual: A Summary of Facts and Figures Dealing with Prohibition". Internet Archive. Ohio: National Assoc. of Distillers and Wholesale Dealers ~ U.S. Publicity Depart. 1915.
- "The Anti-Prohibition Manual: A Summary of Facts and Figures Dealing with Prohibition". Internet Archive. Ohio: National Assoc. of Distillers and Wholesale Dealers ~ U.S. Publicity Depart. 1916.
- "The Anti-Prohibition Manual: A Summary of Facts and Figures Dealing with Prohibition". Internet Archive. Ohio: National Assoc. of Distillers and Wholesale Dealers ~ U.S. Publicity Depart. 1917.
- "The Anti-Prohibition Manual: A Summary of Facts and Figures Dealing with Prohibition". Internet Archive. Ohio: National Assoc. of Distillers and Wholesale Dealers ~ U.S. Publicity Depart. 1918.
- Roosevelt, Franklin D. (April 7, 1933). "The Tenth Press Conference – April 7, 1933". Internet Archive. Washington, D.C.: National Archives and Records Service. p. 119.
- Roosevelt, Franklin D. (May 17, 1933). "A Recommendation to the Congress to Enact the National Industrial Recovery Act to Put People to Work – May 17, 1933". Internet Archive. Washington, D.C.: National Archives and Records Service. pp. 202–206.
- 73rd U.S. Congress (June 13, 1933). "1st Called Session, House Resolution 5755 – National Industrial Recovery Act, 1933". University of North Texas Libraries ~ The Portal to Texas History. Hardin-Simmons University Library.
- Gordon, Ernest (1943). The Wrecking of the Eighteenth Amendment. Francestown, N.H.: The Alcohol Information Press. ISBN 978-1-258-40980-7. OCLC 949392 – via Internet Archive.
- Franklin, Jimmie L. "Prohibition". Encyclopedia of Oklahoma History and Culture. Oklahoma Historical Society.
- Franklin, Jimmie L. (1965). "That Noble Experiment: A Note on Prohibition in Oklahoma". The Chronicles of Oklahoma. 43 (1 – Spring 1965). Oklahoma Historical Society: 19–34. LCCN 23027299. OCLC 655582328.
- Levine, Harry G. (January 1985). "The Birth of American Alcohol Control: Prohibition, the Power Elite, and the Problem of Lawlessness" (PDF). City University of New York – Queens College.
- Lyon, Vincent T. (1998). "The Repeal of Prohibition: The End of Oklahoma's Noble Experiment". The Chronicles of Oklahoma. 76 (4 – Winter 1998–99). Oklahoma Historical Society: 416–435. LCCN 23027299. OCLC 655582328.
- Hennech, Michael C.; Etienne-Gray, Tracé (June 12, 2010). "Brewing Industry". Handbook of Texas. Texas State Historical Association.
- Engdahl, Andrew (2012). "A Curious Elixir: Medicinal Beer in the Age of Prohibition". Forum: The Journal of Planning Practice and Education. The Forum: Journal of History: Vol. 4: Issue 1, Article 8. 4. California Polytechnic State University. doi:10.15368/forum.2012v4n1.8.

== Periodical Resources ==
- Urbana Daily Courier (July 12, 1933). "Beer is O.K.'D by Bone Dry Oklahoma, But Close Vote on Repeal is Expected". Illinois Digital Newspaper Collections. University of Illinois at Urbana-Champaign.
- AP Staff (September 9, 1984). "OKLAHOMA'S ANTISALOON LAWS TO FACE VOTERS". The New York Times. Associated Press.
- King, Wayne (September 18, 1984). "OKLAHOMANS ARE VOTING ON SALE OF LIQUOR IN BARS". The New York Times.
- King, Wayne (September 20, 1984). "OKLAHOMA PREPARES TO MAKE A BAR DRINK LEGAL". The New York Times.

== Historical Video Archives ==
- "Industry Booms After Repeal of Prohibition, Ca. 1933". Internet Archive. Universal Studios. 1933.
- "National Archives Footage: Prohibition". Internet Archive. University of California San Francisco Library.
- Prohibition – Ken Burns playlist on YouTube
- Prohibition in the United States: National Ban of Alcohol on YouTube
- WKY News: Tuesday, April 7, 1959 – Oklahoma Election for Repeal of Prohibition on YouTube
- "Yesterday's Newsreel Prohibition & Bootlegging 59354". Internet Archive. PeriscopeFilm.
