= Alcohol laws of Missouri =

Location of Missouri

The alcohol laws of Missouri are among the most permissive in the United States. Missouri is known throughout the Midwest for its largely laissez-faire approach to alcohol regulation, in sharp contrast to the very strict alcohol laws of some of its neighbors, like Kansas and Oklahoma.

== History of Missouri alcohol laws ==
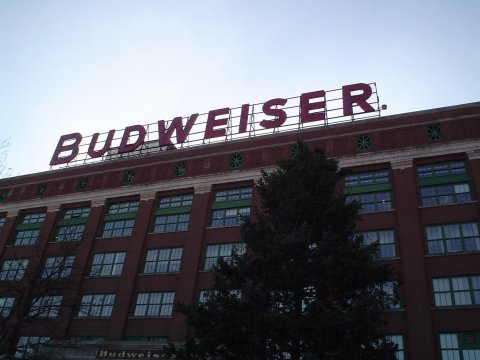
The packaging plant at the Anheuser-Busch headquarters in St. Louis

Nicknamed the "Show Me State", this tendency always has been readily visible with regard to the state's alcohol laws. Missouri's laissez-faire approach to alcohol regulation also stems from its position as the leading alcohol-producing state in America, well known for wine production in the Missouri Rhineland and for beer production in St. Louis by Anheuser-Busch, which produces Budweiser. Anheuser-Busch is the principal advocate of keeping Missouri's alcohol laws as lax as they are.

These laws have generally always been this way. During the height of the temperance movement in the late-19th century and early-20th century before nationwide prohibition, Missouri never implemented its own statewide prohibition. On the contrary, the voters of Missouri rejected prohibition in three separate initiative elections in 1910, 1912, and 1918. When temperance crusader Carrie A. Nation entered a bar in Kansas City in April 1901 and began to smash liquor bottles with her hatchet, she was promptly arrested and fined $500 ($17,844 in 2023 dollars), which her judge stayed as long as she agreed to leave Missouri and never return. The Missouri General Assembly did ratify the 18th Amendment in 1919, but only after it already had received enough previous ratifications to become part of the Constitution.

During Prohibition, political boss Tom Pendergast ensured that the national prohibition law would not affect Kansas City's liquor industry and saloons. Kansas City's federal prosecutor, who was on Pendergast's payroll, never brought a single felony prosecution under the Volstead Act. Effectively, thanks to Pendergast, prohibition did not affect Kansas City. This atmosphere led the editor of the Omaha World-Herald to remark, "If you want to see some sin, forget about Paris. Go to Kansas City."

An 1857 Missouri statute left all liquor regulation to localities, including the question whether to go dry, except the collection of licensing fees. As a result, despite the lack of statewide prohibition, by the end of nationwide prohibition in 1934 half of Missouri's counties had gone dry. Immediately, though, Missouri enacted its first Liquor Control Law, which repealed and superseded those local laws. This was the first time Missouri had any statewide control of liquor. Today, Missouri has no dry jurisdictions whatsoever.

Before state alcohol regulation began in 1934, many Missouri cities, including both St. Louis and Kansas City, had banned Sunday liquor sales. Missouri's original 1934 Liquor Control Law prohibited Sunday sales of beverages with more than 5% alcohol by volume, but this restriction was lifted entirely in 1975.

For 2013, the annual "Freedom in the 50 States" study prepared by the Mercatus Center at George Mason University ranked Missouri third in the nation in alcohol freedom, noting Missouri's "alcohol regime is one of the least restrictive in the United States, with no blue laws and taxes well below average."

== What constitutes "intoxicating liquor" ==
Unlike many states, the alcohol laws of Missouri do not differentiate between types of alcohol based on the percentage of alcohol in a given beverage. Missouri's Liquor Control Law covers any "alcohol for beverage purposes, alcohol, spiritous, vinous, fermented, malt, or other liquors, or combination of liquors, a part of which is spiritous, vinous, or fermented, and all preparations or mixtures for beverage purposes, containing in excess of one-half of one percent by volume." Thus, the Liquor Control Law covers any type of alcoholic beverage which contains more than 0.5% alcohol by volume.

Until 2009 there was a separate regulation for beer containing at least 0.5% alcohol by volume and at most 3.2% alcohol by weight, which was classified as "nonintoxicating beer" (rather than a liquor) and was subject to a separate law from the Liquor Control Law. For a long time, however, the Nonintoxicating Beer Law was rarely invoked, as the Liquor Control Law's permissive sale provisions for any alcoholic beverage made so-called "three-two beer" a rarity in Missouri. The Missouri General Assembly repealed it in August 2009. The Liquor Control Law now controls all alcoholic beverages containing more than 0.5% alcohol by volume.

Any beverage containing less than 0.5% alcohol by volume (including low alcohol beer) is expressly exempt from all alcohol regulation in Missouri (including age restrictions), and is subject only to ordinary food safety laws.

== Liquor sales ==
=== Off-premises sales ===
A bar in Downtown Kansas City advertising "Liquors by drink or package," meaning that it is licensed as both a bar and liquor store.

Missouri has no specific state limitations on the places where alcohol may be sold "off-premises" (i.e. for consumption elsewhere). As a result, Missouri is famous in the region for grocery stores, drug stores, and even gas stations throughout the state which sell a wide variety of beer, wine, and liquor. As long as it is not located within 100 feet (30 m) of a school or church, virtually any retail business (including a vague and undefined "general merchandise store") which obtains the proper licenses from the Division of Alcohol and Tobacco Control and local authorities may sell any type of alcohol. State law even forbids a local option and prohibits cities and counties from banning the off-premises sale of alcohol.

Missouri does, however, limit the hours of retail alcohol sales to between 1:30 AM and 6:30 AM Monday through Saturday, and – for an additional license fee – between 1:30 AM and 6:30 AM on Sunday (beginning August 28, 2021).

Most municipalities, including St. Louis and Kansas City have enacted local laws following the state law, which prohibit the retail sale of liquor between 1:30 AM and 6:30 AM Tuesday through Saturday, and between midnight on Sunday and 9:00 AM the following morning. Sunday hours were changed to the same hours as weekdays on August 28, 2021.

No Missouri law prohibits establishments from holding both off-premises and on-premises licenses. As a result, some businesses are licensed to sell liquor both "by the drink" (individually for consumption on premises) and "by the package" (by the container for consumption off premises). Effectively, these are bars which double as liquor stores. In these places, off-premises sales are allowed until 1:30 a.m., even in those in St. Louis and Kansas City specially licensed to serve liquor by the drink until 3:00 a.m. (on-premises sales may continue until 3:00, but off-premises sales must cease by 1:30).

=== On-premises sales ===
Generally, the hours for sales of liquor by the drink (for consumption on the premises) are the same as liquor by the package: between 6:00 AM and 1:30 AM Monday through Sunday, State law allows incorporated cities to prohibit the on-premises sale of liquor by public referendum, although no city in Missouri ever has held such a referendum. The on-premises sale of liquor is allowed throughout the state, without any limitation except for the hours when sale is permitted.

Since 1981, properly licensed establishments with certain levels of annual revenue in Kansas City, Jackson County, North Kansas City, St. Louis, and St. Louis County have been permitted to sell liquor by the drink between 6:00 AM and 3:00 AM Mondays through Sunday.

== Shipping ==
Except for wine, Missouri places no limitations on the interstate shipping of alcohol into the state, as long the alcohol is in a quantity less than five gallons, has been lawfully manufactured in its source jurisdiction, and is shipped to a person who is at least 21 years of age. There are no quantity limits whatsoever for shipments which are entirely within Missouri or which are made by licensed Missouri alcohol retailers.

=== Bulk shipments ===
To ship alcohol into Missouri in quantities greater than five gallons, both the commercial carrier doing the shipping and the sender itself must obtain a "transporter's license" from the Missouri Department of Revenue and pay the necessary licensing fees. Additionally, for such shipments, the commercial carrier must be generally licensed to do business by the Department of Economic Development. In practice, ordinary commercial shippers like FedEx and UPS have the necessary licenses.

=== Special regulations for wine shipments ===
An alcohol retailer licensed in Missouri or in any other state which has similar, "reciprocal" wine-shipping laws may ship up to two cases of wine each year to any Missouri resident over the age of 21, provided that the wine is for personal use and not for resale. Such a delivery is deemed not to be a sale in Missouri.

Missouri allows wine manufacturers licensed in any state to obtain a "wine direct shipper license" from the Division of Alcohol and Tobacco Control, which allows them to ship up to two cases of wine per month directly to any individual in Missouri who is at least 21 years old. Unlike shipments under the "reciprocal" provision, for shipments under this provision, the wine manufacturer must use a licensed alcohol carrier.

== Open container ==
=== Driving ===
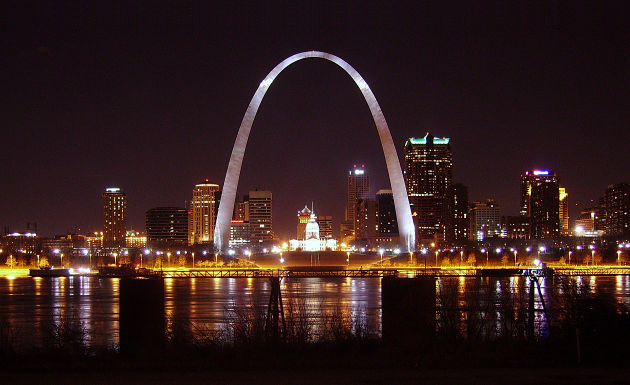
Skyline of St. Louis, Missouri, where, as in most of Missouri, passengers (but not drivers) may possess open containers and drink openly in moving vehicles

Although a driver is prohibited from consuming alcohol while driving, Missouri has no general open container law for vehicles, a characteristic which Missouri shares only with the states of Arkansas, Connecticut, Delaware, Mississippi, Virginia, and West Virginia. Any non-driving vehicle passenger thus is permitted to possess an open container and consume alcohol in Missouri while the vehicle is in motion, although 31 smaller municipalities, the largest being Columbia, Independence and St. Charles, have local open container laws. The metropolises of St. Louis (except St. Charles) and Kansas City (except Independence) have no local open container laws, and thus the state law (or lack thereof) governs. This makes it possible for a passenger to drink legally through the entire 250-mile (400 km) trip across Missouri on Interstate 70 between Downtown Kansas City and Downtown St. Louis, only closing the container while passing through the city limits of Independence, Bates City, Columbia, Foristell, and St. Charles.

As a result of having no state open container laws, under the federal Transportation Equity Act for the 21st century of 1999, a percentage of Missouri's federal highway funds is transferred instead to alcohol education programs each year. Since 1999, the Missouri General Assembly has considered several bills which would have created open container regimens satisfying the federal law, but each one "failed due to weak legislative support." Anheuser-Busch leads opposition to enacting a passenger open container law.

=== In public ===
Missouri also is one of only six states (along with Georgia, Louisiana, Montana, Nevada, and Pennsylvania) which has no state law prohibiting drinking in public, although an establishment selling liquor by the drink ordinarily may not permit a patron to take unfinished liquor off the premises. Restaurant and winery patrons, though, may take unfinished bottles of wine out of the restaurant or winery, provided that the containers are closed and placed in sealed bags.

Missouri has no state public intoxication law either, unlike many other states, and state law expressly prohibits local jurisdictions from enacting any law "which authorizes or requires arrest or punishment for public intoxication or being a common or habitual drunkard or alcoholic."

It is a misdemeanor in Missouri, however, to be both intoxicated and disorderly or to consume or offer any alcoholic beverage specifically in any school, church, or courthouse. Consumption and offering in courthouses is permitted, though, at social functions after business hours when authorized by the court.

Despite the lack of a general state law prohibiting drinking in public, nearly all municipalities, including both St. Louis and Kansas City, do prohibit drinking in public. St. Louis, however, does allow picnickers in public parks to consume alcohol without limitation.

=== Special allowance for open containers in public in Kansas City ===
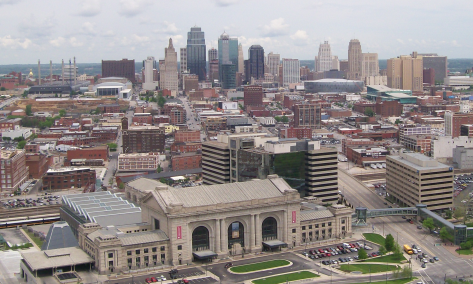
Downtown Kansas City, Missouri, where open containers have been allowed in the street in certain areas since the spring of 2008

In 2005, anticipating Kansas City's new Power & Light District, a nine-block shopping, bar, and restaurant entertainment district in Downtown Kansas City, and after lobbying by the Cordish Company of Baltimore (the District's developer), the Missouri General Assembly passed a new law specifically allowing patrons of any "entertainment district" in Downtown Kansas City to remove any alcoholic beverage from any establishment in the district and carry it openly throughout the district, provided that the beverage is in a plastic cup marked with the logo of the establishment at which it was purchased.

The City Council later legalized the possession of an open container in any portion not open to vehicular traffic of the Power & Light District, Kauffman Center for the Performing Arts, the Crossroads Arts District, the 18th and Vine Historic District, the Liberty Memorial, Crown Center, and the Union Hill neighborhood. The Power & Light District opened in the spring of 2008, and no law prohibits drinking there "in the street." It is one of only a few places in the United States where open containers are allowed in public.

== DUI ==
Like every other state in the United States, driving under the influence is a crime in Missouri, and is subject to a great number of regulations outside of the Liquor Control Law. Missouri's maximum blood alcohol level for driving is .08% for persons over the age of 21 and .02% for minors and adults under age 21.

Ordinarily, DUI is a misdemeanor in Missouri, although the third DUI conviction becomes a felony. Refusal to take a chemical test (i.e. breathalyzer) when so requested by a law enforcement officer who has probable cause will result in a one-year suspension of the suspect's driver's license.

== Minors and alcohol in Missouri ==
=== Drinking age ===
Missouri's drinking age has been 21 since 1945. That is, Missouri law prohibits minors from possessing or purchasing alcohol. Thus, when the National Minimum Drinking Age Act of 1984 came into effect on January 1, 1985, Missouri was in no danger of losing federal highway funds.

A minor in possession (MIP) of alcohol or a business or person which furnishes alcohol to a minor is guilty of a misdemeanor, although for sellers there are numerous defenses and exceptions. Missouri is one of six states, however, with a unique exception which allows a minor to be furnished alcohol by their parent or guardian. Of course, if a parent or guardian purposefully intoxicated their child, it would be a form of child abuse. Rather, this sort of law allows parents to let their children have a small amount of liquor with a meal, at social gatherings, in religious services, or otherwise use alcohol in moderation. Additionally, although Missouri prohibits minors from possessing or purchasing alcohol, it is one of 20 states (and the District of Columbia) which have no specific law prohibiting the consumption of alcohol by minors.

In 2005, though, the Missouri General Assembly amended the Liquor Control Law to prohibit any minor from having a blood alcohol level higher than .02%. This new law has been referred to as "Possession by Consumption". It remains unclear how the provision permitting family consumption, the lack of a specific consumption prohibition, and the new "minor under the influence" law will work together.

==== Special expungement for MIP ====
Since 2005, Missouri law has had a special method of expungement for a person who pleaded guilty to or was convicted of being a minor in possession of alcohol one time in Missouri. If more than a year has passed since said person turns 21, and said person has had no other MIP expungements and has had no other alcohol-related law enforcement contacts (like drunk driving or violating the terms of a liquor license), then all records of the case can be completely deleted upon proper application to the Circuit Court of the county in which the person was charged.

=== Fake ID ===
In Missouri, it is only a misdemeanor punishable by up to a $500 fine for a person under 21 to represent by virtue of displaying a fake ID that they are over 21 for the purposes of purchasing or possessing alcohol. Additionally, it constitutes a separate misdemeanor under the Liquor Control Law if the minor reproduced or altered the ID themself, punishable by up to one year in prison and/or a fine of up to $1,000.

The forgery of an identity document is a separate felony in Missouri, punishable by up to seven years in prison and/or a fine of up to $5,000 (or if financial gain was made, up to the amount of that financial gain). Possession of forgery instruments also is a felony with the same prospective punishments as that of ordinary forgery.

== See also ==
- Alcohol laws of the United States by state
- History of Kansas City
- History of St. Louis, Missouri
- Smoking laws of Missouri
- People and culture of St. Louis, Missouri
- Sumptuary law
- Tom Pendergast
- Wine shipping laws in the United States
