= Open-container law =

Public alcohol use restriction law

An open-container law is a law which regulates or prohibits drinking alcohol in public by limiting the existence of open alcoholic beverage containers in certain areas, as well as the active consumption of alcohol in those areas. "Public places" in this context refers to openly public places like sidewalks, parks and vehicles. It does not include nominally private spaces which are open to the public including bars, restaurants and stadiums.

An open-container law may also refer to the prohibition of drivers (and sometimes passengers) from having any open container of an alcoholic beverage inside their vehicle in areas which are readily accessible to vehicle occupants (generally excluding the trunk). The stated purpose of the laws is to restrict public intoxication, especially the dangerous act of operating a vehicle while intoxicated.

== United States ==
In the United States, open-container laws are U.S. state laws, rather than federal laws; they vary from state to state. The majority of U.S. states and localities prohibit possessing or consuming an open container of alcohol in public places, such as on the street, while 24 states do not have statutes regarding the public consumption of alcohol. However, the definition of "public place" is not always clear. California is unique in that it has a state law on the books which only prohibits possessing alcoholic beverage containers that have been opened (unless that container is in one's possession "for the purpose of recycling or other related activity") in public places owned by a city, county, or city and county, or any recreation and park district, regional park, or open-space district, but similar to states that have no law, the state law only applies to some or all of the aforementioned areas in which the "city, county, or city and county have enacted an ordinance".

The possession of cans, bottles or flasks or other vessels containing an alcoholic beverage could potentially result in a violation of open container laws. To be “open”, in most cases, means that some of the contents have been removed, the seal is broken, the cap is off or the alcohol is otherwise readily accessible. Some states which have legalized cannabis possession also prohibit open containers that contain cannabis in public places.

Open container restrictions are not always rigorously enforced and open containers may in fact be legally permitted in nominally private events which are open to the public. That is especially true in downtown districts and during holidays and sporting events; see tailgate party.

=== Cities ===
There are public places in the United States where open containers are explicitly permitted:

- Gainesville, Florida allows the consumption of alcoholic beverages in public.
- Indiana allows the consumption of alcoholic beverages in public.
- Hood River, Oregon allows the consumption of alcoholic beverages in public.
- The city of Butte, Montana, prohibits open containers only between 2:00 am and 8:00 am. Drinking openly in the street is allowed throughout the city (and elsewhere in Montana where no local laws exist) during the other 18 hours of the day. A recent attempt to pass a comprehensive open container prohibition in Butte met with widespread opposition and was dropped. However, Montana state law does prohibit open containers in vehicles on a highway.
- In the Power & Light District of Kansas City, Missouri, a special Missouri state law preempts Kansas City's ordinary local law against open containers and allows the possession and consumption of alcoholic beverages on the street in open plastic containers. Although Missouri has no statewide open container law, the Power & Light District remains the only part of Kansas City where open containers are allowed actually on the street, and throughout the rest of Kansas City, open containers remain expressly prohibited.
- In unincorporated Clark County, Nevada (including the Las Vegas Strip) the laws allow the possession and consumption on the street of alcoholic beverages except within parking lots or, if the alcohol was purchased in a closed container, on the premises of or within 1,000 feet (300 m) of the store from which it was purchased. It is also illegal to possess a glass or aluminum beverage container on specially designated streets during special events, such as the Strip on New Year's Eve.
- The city of New Orleans allows the possession and consumption on the street of any alcoholic beverage in an open plastic container (not in glass bottles or containers). In some parts of Louisiana, however, open containers are still prohibited, despite the fact that drive-thru frozen daiquiri stands are legal.
- In the Savannah Historic District of downtown Savannah, Georgia, city law allows possession and consumption on the street of one alcoholic beverage in an open plastic container of not more than 16 US fluid ounces (470 ml). Because Georgia has no state public open container law, the city law governs. Throughout the rest of Savannah, however, open containers remain prohibited.
- Within an approximately 80-acre (32 ha) area of downtown Dalton, Georgia, city law allows possession and consumption on the street of one alcoholic beverage in an open paper or plastic cup of no more than 16 US fluid ounces (470 ml) between 12:30 p.m. and midnight. The boundaries of the permitted area are Hawthorne Street, the western right-of-way of the L&N Railway, Morris Street, and Thornton Avenue. The beverage must be dispensed by a licensed establishment in the designated area in a cup that meets specifications issued by the Downtown Dalton Development Authority. Throughout the rest of Dalton, however, open containers remain prohibited.
- The state of Ohio since 2015, allows cities to create a limited number of "designated outdoor refreshment areas" (DORA) where alcoholic beverages are permitted (Sub. H.B. No. 47). Cities which have created these districts include Canton, Delaware, Hamilton, Lancaster, Logan, Lorain, Middletown, and Toledo.
- The city of Mobile, Alabama allows open plastic containers with a commercially printed name or logo of a designated licensee.
- The city of Tampa, Florida allows up to two drinks in plastic containers per person on the Tampa Riverwalk, purchased from one of the licensed facilities along it, between 11am and 1am.
- In 2020, New Jersey made public drinking allowed in tourist spots such as the beach and boardwalk of Atlantic City, while Michigan allowed cities to grant social district permits for the open consumption of alcohol.

=== Vehicles ===
Prohibition of Open Containers of Alcohol in Motor Vehicles as of 2009

To comply with the TEA-21 rules of the federal Department of Transportation, a state's motor vehicle open container laws must:

- Prohibit both possession of any open alcoholic beverage container and consumption of any alcoholic beverage in a motor vehicle;
- Cover the passenger area of any motor vehicle, including unlocked glove compartments and any other areas of the vehicle that are readily accessible to the driver or passengers while in their seats;
- Apply to all open alcoholic beverage containers and all alcoholic beverages, including beer, wine, and spirits that contain one-half of one percent or more of alcohol by volume;
- Apply to all vehicle occupants except for passengers of vehicles designed, maintained or used primarily for the transportation of people for compensation (such as buses, taxi cabs, and limousines) or the living quarters of motor homes;
- Apply to all vehicles on a public highway or the right-of-way (i.e. on the shoulder) of a public highway;
- Require primary enforcement of the law, rather than requiring probable cause that another violation had been committed before allowing enforcement of the open container law.

The District of Columbia and 39 states are in full compliance with federal government guidelines. However, passengers may either possess open containers or consume alcohol in Alaska, Arkansas, Connecticut, Delaware, Louisiana, Missouri, Rhode Island, Tennessee, Virginia, and West Virginia. The states do not meet the necessary level of TEA-21 compliance.

In some states, the open container laws apply even if your vehicle is parked on a public road, street, highway, interstate or another publicly maintained thoroughfare. For example, in Texas a vehicle does not need to be in motion for the driver to be cited for an open container violation. Mississippi is the only state which does not expressly prohibit the possession of an open container while driving but many states allow passengers to have an open container.

Penalties for open container violations vary from state to state but include fines, possible jail time, license demerit points, and community service.

Cannabis Open Container Laws

In U.S. states that have legalized cannabis possession, open container laws typically extend to cannabis. This includes California, Illinois, Colorado, Massachusetts, and seven other states. In the states, a container of marijuana cannot be opened and readily accessible to the driver of a vehicle.

== See also ==
- Alcohol laws of the United States by state
- Alcohol laws of Kansas
- Alcohol laws of Missouri
- Alcohol laws of New York
- Alcohol laws of Oklahoma
- Alcohol laws of Tennessee
