= Kansas Division of Alcoholic Beverage Control =

The Division of Alcoholic Beverage Control is a Kansas state government agency responsible for enforcing the alcohol laws of Kansas. It issues state licenses and permits, monitors the flow of restricted products, inspects licensed premises and enforces restrictions on underage purchasing and drinking of alcohol. ABC Agents are state certified Law Enforcement agents, therefore being armed and possessing powers of arrest. While primarily focusing on the enforcement of the Kansas laws regarding liquor, tobacco and tax enforcement, Agents at times assist other law enforcement agencies with other matters of an urgent nature.

== See also ==
- List of law enforcement agencies in Kansas
