= Alcohol laws of Tennessee =

Map showing dry (red), moist (yellow), and wet (blue) counties in Tennessee

The alcohol laws of Tennessee are distinct in that they vary considerably by county.

Local government jurisdictions (counties and municipalities) in Tennessee by default are dry and do not allow the sales of liquor or wine. These governments must amend the laws to allow for liquor-by-the-drink sales and retail package stores. In many cases, the county may be dry, but a municipality is wet. The sale of beer is not affected by a dry or wet designation. This list may not reflect recent changes.

== Dry counties ==
In a dry county, the sale of alcohol and alcoholic beverages is prohibited or restricted – 1 of Tennessee's 95 counties is completely dry and another is almost entirely dry with very specific exceptions.

- Hancock County completely dry
- Moore County Despite being home to Jack Daniel's Distillery, Moore County itself was once completely dry. However, the county now allows the sale of commemorative bottles of Jack Daniel's in the White Rabbit Bottle Shop, and one can take part in a sampling tour at the distillery. It is also now possible to sample wine, rum, vodka and whiskey in shops where it is distilled on premises. Beer is also available in local food establishments when served with a meal.

== Moist counties ==
In a moist county, the sale of alcohol and alcoholic beverages in certain jurisdictions is permitted. This designation applies to 83 out of Tennessee's 95 counties.

- Anderson County permits both
- Bedford County permits both
- Benton County permits Retail package stores
- Bledsoe County permits both
- Blount County permits both
- Bradley County liquor-by-the-drink ONLY
- Campbell County permits both
- Cannon County permits both
- Carroll County Retail package stores
- Carter County liquor-by-the-drink county-wide and retail package stores restricted to Elizabethton city limits (limited to three stores maximum)
- Cheatham County permits both
- Chester County The city of Smithville permits both, but the sale of alcohol remains illegal in the greater county.
- Claiborne County Liquor-by-the-drink (New Tazewell) and wine in retail food stores (Tazewell)
- Clay County Retail package stores
- Cocke County permits both
- Coffee County permits both
- Crockett County Retail package stores in Alamo (2020 referendum)
- DeKalb County Retail package stores
- Decatur County Retail package stores (2022 referendum). Liquor-by-the-drink in restaurants with a dining capacity of 75 or greater within three miles of the Tennessee River
- Dickson County permits both
- Dyer County permits both
- Fayette County permits both
- Fentress County Retail package stores in Jamestown (2020 referendum)
- Franklin County permits both
- Gibson County permits both
- Giles County permits both
- Grainger County Liquor-by-the-drink in Blaine (2016 referendum)
- Greene County Retail package stores
- Grundy County Retail package stores
- Hamblen County permits both
- Hardeman County liquor-by-the-drink ONLY
- Hardin County Retail package stores, Liquor-by-the-drink in restaurants with a dining capacity of 75 or greater within three miles of Tennessee River
- Hawkins County Retail package stores
- Haywood County liquor-by-the-drink ONLY
- Henderson County Retail package stores ONLY (no liquor-by-the-drink), and only within the city limits of Lexington, new referendum passed September 8, 2011
- Henry County permits both
- Hickman County Retail package stores ONLY and only within the city limits of Centerville. This is due to state law not allowing liquor stores in unincorporated areas. Centerville is the only incorporated city in the county.
- Houston County Retail package store in Erin (2014 referendum)
- Humphreys County Retail package stores, Liquor-by-the-drink in Waverly (Referendum passed November 2016)
- Jackson County Retail package stores
- Jefferson County permits both
- Johnson County permits both (2018 referendums)
- Lake County Retail Package Store
- Lauderdale County permits both
- Lawrence County Retail package stores
- Lewis County Retail Package Stores
- Lincoln County permits both
- Macon County Retail package store in Red Boiling Springs and Lafayette. Liquor-by-the-drink in Lafayette.
- Madison County permits both
- Marion County permits both
- Marshall County permits both
- Maury County permits both
- McMinn County Full retail sales of liquor allowed on a community elective basis.
- McNairy County permits both in Selmer ONLY (2015 referendum)
- Meigs County permits both (2026 referendum)
- Montgomery County permits both
- Monroe County permits both
- Moore County only allows the sampling and the purchase of liquor on the premises of Jack Daniel's Distillery
- Morgan County permits package store. Allows both in Wartburg (2024 referendum)
- Obion County liquor-by-the-drink ONLY
- Overton County liquor-by-the-drink ONLY
- Perry County Retail package stores
- Pickett County Retail package store in Byrdstown
- Putnam County permits both
- Rhea County permits both
- Roane County permits both
- Robertson County permits both
- Scott County permits both
- Sequatchie County permits both
- Sevier County permits both
- Smith County permits both
- Stewart County Retail package stores (2022 refereendum)
- Sullivan County permits both
- Tipton County permits both
- Trousdale County Retail package stores
- Unicoi County Liquor-by-the-drink ONLY
- Union County Liquor-by-the-drink in restaurants and winery in Maynardville
- Van Buren County Retail package stores
- Warren County permits both
- Washington County permits both
- Wayne County Liquor-by-the-drink (2024 referendum) and retail package stores in Clifton (2018 referendum)
- Weakley County Liquor-by-the-drink ONLY
- White County Liquor-by-the-drink ONLY
- Wilson County permits both

== Wet counties ==
The designation of a wet county applies to jurisdictions where the sale of alcohol and alcoholic beverages is permitted – 10 out of Tennessee's 95 counties are wet. The state's four largest cities, Memphis (Shelby), Nashville (Davidson), Knoxville (Knox), and Chattanooga (Hamilton), are located in wet counties.

- Cumberland County
- Davidson County
- Hamilton County
- Knox County
- Loudon County
- Polk County
- Rutherford County
- Shelby County
- Sumner County
- Williamson County

== Distilleries ==
By 1810, registered distilleries numbered 14,191 and were producing 25.5 million gallons of whiskey. In 2009, the Tennessee General Assembly amended the statute that had for many years limited the distillation of drinkable spirits to just three counties (Lincoln, Moore, and Coffee). The revised law allows distilleries to be established in 41 additional counties (counties in which liquor-by-the-drink was legal). This change was expected to lead to the establishment of small distilleries, thus increasing the number of producers of Tennessee whiskey. As of March 2013, there are five brands with at least one Tennessee whiskey on the market, and several with whiskey in the barrel awaiting release.

== See also ==
- Moist county (Kentucky)
