= Alcohol laws of Kentucky =

The location of Kentucky within the United States.

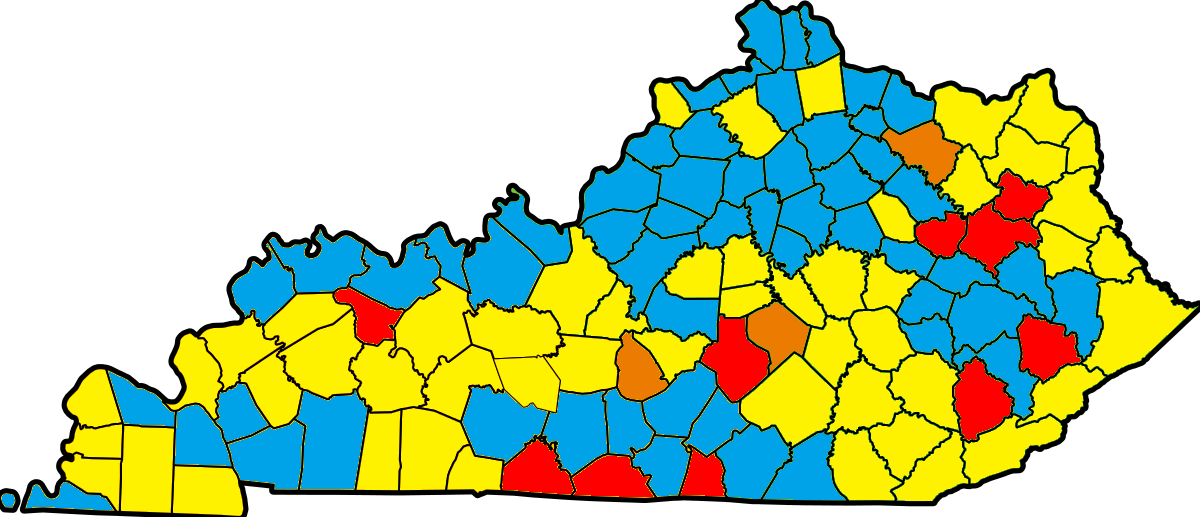
Map of Kentucky counties' wet and dry status. Blue: Wet Counties Yellow: Moist/Limited Counties Orange: Dry Counties (with a winery, golf course, or a qualified historic site) Red: Completely Dry Counties

The alcohol laws of Kentucky, which govern the sale and consumption of alcoholic beverages in that state, lead to a patchwork of counties that are either dry (prohibiting all sale of alcoholic beverage), or wet (permitting full retail sales under state license), or "moist" (occupying a middle ground between the two). A justice of the Kentucky Supreme Court wrote in 1985 that the state's alcohol laws were a "maze of obscure statutory language" and "confusing at best." The general counsel of the Kentucky Office of Alcoholic Beverage Control (ABC) noted in 2012, "That's still the case." This led Kentucky governor Steve Beshear to appoint a task force in summer 2012 to attempt to streamline the state's alcohol laws.

== Quirks ==
Apart from the laws governing local option elections by which communities can determine whether alcoholic beverages can be sold at all, many aspects of the state's alcohol laws were called "perplexing" in a 2012 story in one of Kentucky's largest newspapers, the Lexington Herald-Leader. The confusion starts with licensing itself—the state issues more than 70 different types of licenses for alcohol sales.

One significant quirk is that wine can be purchased in a pharmacy, but not in a supermarket. The sale of wine and distilled spirits at pharmacies and grocery stores is regulated by laws that date to Prohibition. At the time, prescriptions for alcohol could be obtained at pharmacies (sometimes referred to as spirits of frumenti). After the end of national Prohibition, sales were prohibited in grocery stores because it was thought that minors were more likely to be in those businesses than in pharmacies. Today, while grocery stores can hold wine and distilled spirits licenses, they can only sell such beverages if they provide a separate entrance to that part of the store and not allow minors to work there. By contrast, grocery stores can sell beer in the main shopping area.

Another inconsistency involves the difference between legal ages for buying and selling alcoholic beverages. The legal age for purchase is 21, as in all U.S. states. However, the legal age for selling or serving alcoholic beverages in a licensed establishment is 20.

== Wet and dry status ==
The ABC uses very specific terminology to classify the state's 120 counties as "wet", "dry", "moist", or dry with special provisions.

- Dry – All sales of alcoholic beverages are prohibited
- Wet – Sales of alcoholic beverages for on-site or off-site consumption are allowed in at least some areas outside of an incorporated city. However, many "wet" counties have dry precincts. Kentucky's two consolidated city-county governments, Louisville and Lexington, are both wet, although as noted below, a few precincts in Louisville are dry
- Moist – An otherwise dry county where one or more specific cities have voted to allow alcohol sales for off-premises consumption
- Limited – A county in which at least some otherwise dry territory has approved the sale of alcohol by the drink at qualifying restaurants. Under this category, the ABC has secondary classifications of "Limited (100)" and "Limited (50)", with the numbers referring to the seating capacity required for a restaurant to apply for a license
- Golf course – A county in which at least some otherwise dry territory has approved the sale of alcohol by the drink at a qualifying golf course
- Winery – A county in which at least some otherwise dry territory has approved the operation of a winery
- Qualified Historic Site (QHS) – A county in which at least some otherwise dry territory has approved the sale of alcohol by the drink at a qualifying historic site

In popular usage, "moist" has a much broader meaning than the ABC's specific usage. In addition to the ABC definition, "moist" can also refer to a county where alcohol sales have been approved under any of the special provisions allowed by Kentucky law—in other words, any status other than "dry" or "wet". More often, the term is used to refer to otherwise dry cities or counties that have approved restaurant sales by the drink, as evidenced by a July 2012 editorial by The Independent of Ashland where the term "moist" is repeatedly used to describe several such locations.

According to the last official ABC update of counties on January 3, 2013, 38 counties are dry, 32 are wet, and the remaining 50 are either "moist" or dry with special circumstances.

=== Possible definitions of "moist" ===
A county can be "moist", by popular definition, in several different ways:

- Thirty-five cities in 30 counties are wet cities located in dry counties, bringing those counties under the ABC definition of "moist". Boyle County has three wet cities (Danville, Junction City, and Perryville), and Hardin and Hopkins Counties have three each. Knox and Whitley Counties share the same wet city, namely Corbin. The most recent cities to vote wet under this statute did so in successive weeks in the summer of 2012—Franklin and Murray on July 17, La Grange on July 24, Georgetown on July 31, and Princeton on August 7. The first four of these cities had previously allowed sales by the drink in restaurants—Franklin, Murray and Georgetown by city votes, and La Grange by a county-wide vote—while Princeton had been dry. The cities of Brodhead and Mount Vernon in Rockcastle County passed ballot initiatives allowing the sale of alcohol in November 2018.
- Two different statutes authorize local option elections, at either the county or city level, for sales of alcohol by the drink in restaurants:
  - Kentucky Revised Statutes (KRS) 242.185(6) requires that restaurants seat at least 100 patrons and derive at least 70% of their total sales from food to be allowed to serve alcohol by the drink. (For the purpose of determining whether a restaurant meets the 70% requirement, sales of non-alcoholic beverages are classified as "food".) The first city to approve sales under this statute was Murray in 2000; 27 other cities and three counties have since voted to approve such sales. One of these cities (Corbin) is also classified as "wet", having approved full retail sales in February 2012. In Oldham County, which allows such sales county-wide, its county seat of La Grange (as previously noted) voted itself fully wet in July 2012. A future "wet" vote does not affect the licenses of any restaurants that were approved for licenses under this statute; state officials confirmed this before Murray's 2012 "wet" vote.
  - KRS 242.1244, enacted into law in June 2007, also requires that restaurants derive at least 70% of their total sales from food, but lowers the seating limit to 50 patrons. Restaurants licensed under this statute are not allowed to have separate bars, and can only serve alcohol to customers who purchase a meal, and only during a time frame that starts with the serving of the meal and ends 30 minutes after the customer finishes his or her meal. The first jurisdiction to approve sales under this statute was the city of Campbellsville; since then, five other cities, plus all of Henry County, have voted to allow sales under this law. Presumably, a future "wet" vote will also not affect the licenses of any restaurants approved for licenses under this specific statute.
- Under KRS 242.123, an individual precinct within any dry territory—which can be a dry county, or a dry portion of an otherwise wet county—that contains a USGA-regulation golf course may vote to allow the sale of alcoholic beverages by the drink on that specific course. As of January 2013, 26 golf courses in 15 different counties were approved for such sales at the local level, with two awaiting state approval.
- KRS 243.155 allows individual precincts within dry territory to vote to allow a "small farm winery" to operate within the precinct. Once approved, a winery not only can produce and sell wine on its premises but also can apply for a license to sell wine and beer by the drink in a restaurant located on its premises. As of January 2013, 28 wineries in 20 different counties had been approved locally. Of these 28 locations, three were awaiting state licensure, and four had obtained licenses but later closed. KRS 243.154 allows a wholesale distributor of wine produced in small farm wineries to operate in dry territory.
- KRS 242.1242, enacted into law in June 2007, allows precincts in dry territory that also house a "qualified historic site"—defined in KRS 241.010(34) as either a site listed on the National Register of Historic Places or a National Historic Landmark, which also includes dining facilities for at least 50 patrons—to hold a local option election to allow sales of alcohol by the drink at qualified sites in that precinct. (When originally passed, the definition of a "qualified historic site" required that the location provide lodging, but that provision was removed in 2010.) The first such election was held in the North Burgin precinct of Mercer County on November 6, 2007, in which voters approved such sales at the Shaker Village of Pleasant Hill, the largest restored Shaker settlement in the U.S. Since then, two other locations have voted to allow sales under this statute, but both are awaiting state licensing. One of these two, Boone Tavern in Berea, faces an additional complication—Berea College, the establishment's owner, has not yet determined whether it will apply for a license.
- Finally, KRS 242.125 allows individual precincts in a city or county to vote dry in a wet city or county, and also allows dry precincts within an otherwise wet city or county to vote wet. An example of this law was in September 2007, when four precincts in Louisville's west end voted to end liquor sales as a deterrent to crime in the area. A more recent example occurred in August 2012, when three dry precincts in Sturgis, located in the wet Union County, held local option elections; one of the three precincts voted wet.

== Safety issues ==
A study of about 39,000 alcohol-related traffic accidents in Kentucky found that residents of dry counties are more likely to be involved in such crashes, possibly because they have to drive farther from their homes to consume alcohol, thus increasing impaired driving exposure. The study concludes that county-level prohibition is not necessarily effective in improving highway safety.
