= List of law enforcement agencies in Kansas =

This is a list of law enforcement agencies in the state of Kansas.

According to the US Bureau of Justice Statistics' 2018 Census of State and Local Law Enforcement Agencies, the state had 364 law enforcement agencies employing 7,927 sworn police officers, about 272 for each 100,000 residents.

== State agencies ==
- Kansas Bureau of Investigation
- Kansas Department of Corrections
- Kansas Department of Revenue
  - Kansas State Alcoholic Beverage Control
- Kansas Department of Wildlife, Parks and Tourism
- Kansas Highway Patrol
- Kansas State Fire Marshal
- Kansas Lottery Security & Law Enforcement Division (S.L.E.D.)
- Kansas Department of Labor
- Kansas Attorney General's Office

== County agencies ==
- Allen County Sheriff's Office
- Anderson County Sheriff's Office
- Atchison County Sheriff's Office
- Barber County Sheriff's Office
- Barton County Sheriff's Office
- Bourbon County Sheriff's Office
- Brown County Sheriff's Office
- Butler County Sheriff's Office
- Chase County Sheriff's Office
- Chautauqua County Sheriff's Office
- Cherokee County Sheriff's Office
- Cheyenne County Sheriff's Office
- Clark County Sheriff's Office
- Clay County Sheriff's Office
- Cloud County Sheriff's Office
- Coffey County Sheriff's Office
- Comanche County Sheriff's Office
- Cowley County Sheriff's Office
- Crawford County Sheriff's Office
- Decatur County Sheriff's Office
- Dickinson County Sheriff's Office
- Doniphan County Sheriff's Office
- Douglas County Sheriff's Office
- Edwards County Sheriff's Office
- Elk County Sheriff's Office
- Ellis County Sheriff's Office
- Ellsworth County Sheriff's Office
- Finney County Sheriff's Office
- Ford County Sheriff's Office
- Franklin County Sheriff's Office
- Geary County Sheriff's Office
- Gove County Sheriff's Office
- Graham County Sheriff's Office
- Grant County Sheriff's Office
- Gray County Sheriff's Office
- Greeley County Sheriff's Office
- Greenwood County Sheriff's Office
- Hamilton County Sheriff's Office
- Harper County Sheriff's Office
- Harvey County Sheriff's Office
- Haskell County Sheriff's Office
- Hodgeman County Sheriff's Office
- Jackson County Sheriff's Office
- Jefferson County Sheriff's Office
- Jewell County Sheriff's Office
- Johnson County Sheriff's Office
- Kearny County Sheriff's Office
- Kingman County Sheriff's Office
- Kiowa County Sheriff's Office
- Labette County Sheriff's Office
- Lane County Sheriff's Office
- Leavenworth County Sheriff's Office
- Lincoln County Sheriff's Office
- Linn County Sheriff's Office
- Logan County Sheriff's Office
- Lyon County Sheriff's Office
- Marion County Sheriff's Office
- Marshall County Sheriff's Office
- McPherson County Sheriff's Office
- Meade County Sheriff's Office
- Miami County Sheriff's Office
- Mitchell County Sheriff's Office
- Montgomery County Sheriff's Office
- Morris County Sheriff's Office
- Morton County Sheriff's Office
- Nemaha County Sheriff's Office
- Neosho County Sheriff's Office
- Ness County Sheriff's Office
- Norton County Sheriff's Office
- Osage County Sheriff's Office
- Osborne County Sheriff's Office
- Ottawa County Sheriff's Office
- Pawnee County Sheriff's Office
- Phillips County Sheriff's Office
- Pottawatomie County Sheriff's Office
- Pratt County Sheriff's Office
- Rawlins County Sheriff's Office
- Reno County Sheriff's Office
- Republic County Sheriff's Office
- Rice County Sheriff's Office
- Riley County Police Department
- Rooks County Sheriff's Office
- Rush County Sheriff's Office
- Russell County Sheriff's Office
- Saline County Sheriff's Office
- Scott County Sheriff's Office
- Sedgwick County Sheriff's Office
- Seward County Sheriff's Office
- Shawnee County Sheriff's Office
- Sheridan County Sheriff's Office
- Sherman County Sheriff's Office
- Smith County Sheriff's Office
- Stafford County Sheriff's Office
- Stanton County Sheriff's Office
- Stevens County Sheriff's Office
- Sumner County Sheriff's Office
- Thomas County Sheriff's Office
- Trego County Sheriff's Office
- Wabaunsee County Sheriff's Office
- Wallace County Sheriff's Office
- Washington County Sheriff's Office
- Wichita County Sheriff's Office
- Wilson County Sheriff's Office
- Woodson County Sheriff's Office
- Wyandotte County Sheriff's Office

== Municipal agencies ==
- Abilene Police Department
- Altamont Police Department
- Andale Police Department
- Andover Police Department
- Anthony Police Department
- Argonia Police Department
- Arkansas City Police Department
- Arma Police Department
- Atchison Police Department
- Atwood Police Department
- Augusta Department of Public Safety
- Baldwin City Police Department
- Bartlett Police Department
- Basehor Police Department
- Baxter Springs Police Department
- Bel Aire Police Department
- Belleville Police Department
- Beloit Police Department
- Bentley Police Department
- Blue Rapids Police Department
- Bonner Springs Police Department
- Burlingame Police Department
- Burlington Police Department
- Burrton Police Department
- Caney Police Department
- Canton Police Department
- Carbondale Police Department
- Cedar Vale Police Department
- Chanute Police Department
- Chapman Police Department
- Chase Police Department
- Cheney Police Department
- Cherokee City Police Department
- Cherryvale Police Department
- Chetopa Police Department
- Cimarron Police Department
- Circleville Police Department
- Clay Center Police Department
- Clearwater Police Department
- Coffeyville Police Department
- Colby Police Department
- Coldwater Police Department
- Columbus Police Department
- Colwich Police Department
- Concordia Police Department
- Conway Springs Police Department
- Council Grove Police Department
- Derby Police Department
- Dodge City Police Department
- Eastborough Police Department
- Edwardsville Police Department
- El Dorado Police Department
- Elkhart Police Department
- Ellinwood Police Department
- Ellis Police Department
- Ellsworth Police Department
- Elwood Police Department
- Emporia Police Department
- Enterprise Police Department
- Erie Police Department
- Eskridge Police Department
- Eudora Police Department
- Fairway Police Department
- Florence Police Department
- Fort Scott Police Department
- Frankfort Police Department
- Fredonia Police Department
- Frontenac Police Department
- Galena Police Department
- Garden City Police Department
- Gardner Police Department
- Garnett Police Department
- Girard Police Department
- Goddard Police Department
- Goodland Police Department
- Grandview Plaza Police Department
- Great Bend Police Department
- Greeley Police Department
- Greensburg Police Department
- Halstead Police Department
- Harper Police Department
- Haven Police Department
- Hays Police Department
- Haysville Police Department
- Herington Police Department
- Hesston Police Department
- Hiawatha Police Department
- Highland Police Department
- Hill City Police Department
- Hillsboro Police Department
- Hoisington Police Department
- Holton Police Department
- Horton Police Department
- Howard Police Department
- Hoxie Police Department
- Hoyt Police Department
- Hugoton Police Department
- Humboldt Police Department
- Hutchinson Police Department
- Independence Police Department
- Inman Police Department
- Iola Police Department
- Johnson County Park Police Department
- Junction City Police Department
- Kansas City Police Department
- Kechi Police Department
- Kingman Police Department
- Kinsley Police Department
- Kiowa Police Department
- La Crosse Police Department
- La Cygne Police Department
- La Harpe Police Department
- Lansing Police Department
- Larned Police Department
- Lawrence Police Department
- Le Roy Police Department
- Leavenworth Police Department
- Leawood Police Department
- Lenexa Police Department
- Lewis Police Department
- Liberal Police Department
- Lindsborg Police Department
- Louisburg Police Department
- Lyndon Police Department
- Lyons Police Department
- Maize Police Department
- Marion Police Department
- Marysville Police Department
- Mayetta Police Department
- McPherson Police Department
- Meade Police Department
- Metropolitan Topeka Airport Authority Police Department
- Melvern Police Department
- Medicine Lodge Police Department
- Meriden Police Department
- Merriam Police Department
- Minneapolis Police Department
- Mission Police Department
- Moran Police Department
- Mound City Police Department
- Moundridge Police Department
- Mt. Hope Police Department
- Mulberry Police Department
- Mulvane Police Department
- Neodesha Police Department
- Newton Police Department
- Nickerson Police Department
- North Newton Police Department
- Norton Police Department
- Nortonville Police Department
- Oakley Police Department
- Oberlin Police Department
- Olathe Police Department
- Onaga Police Department
- Osage City Police Department
- Osawatomie Police Department
- Osborne Police Department
- Oskaloosa Police Department
- Oswego Police Department
- Ottawa Police Department
- Overbrook Police Department
- Overland Park Police Department
- Oxford Police Department
- Paola Police Department
- Park City Police Department
- Parsons Police Department
- Peabody Police Department
- Perry Police Department
- Pittsburg Police Department
- Plainville Police Department
- Pleasanton Police Department
- Prairie Village Police Department
- Pratt Police Department
- Protection Police Department
- Quinter Police Department
- Richmond Police Department
- Riley County Police Department
- Roeland Park Police Department
- Rolla Police Department
- Rose Hill Police Department
- Rossville Police Department
- Russell Police Department
- Sabetha Police Department
- Saint Francis Police Department
- Saint John Police Department
- Saint Marys Police Department
- Salina Police Department
- Scott City Police Department
- Scranton Police Department
- Sedan Police Department
- Sedgwick Police Department
- Seneca Police Department
- Shawnee Police Department
- Silver Lake Police Department
- Smith Center Police Department
- South Hutchinson Police Department
- Spring Hill Police Department
- Stafford Police Department
- Sterling Police Department
- Stockton Police Department
- Tonganoxie Police Department
- Topeka Police Department
- Towanda Police Department
- Troy Police Department
- Udall Police Department
- Ulysses Police Department
- Valley Center Police Department
- Valley Falls Police Department
- Victoria Police Department
- WaKeeney Police Department
- Wakefield Police Department
- Walton Police Department
- Wamego Police Department
- Wathena Police Department
- Waverly Police Department
- Weir Police Department
- Wellington Police Department
- Wellsville Police Department
- Westwood Police Department
- Wichita Police Department
- Wilson Police Department
- Winchester Police Department
- Winfield Police Department
- Yates Center Police Department

== Tribal agencies ==
- Kickapoo Tribal Police Department of Kansas
- Iowa Tribe in Kansas Tribal Police Department
- Prairie Band Potawatomi Tribal Police Department
- Sac & Fox Tribal Police Department

== School, College and University agencies ==
- Auburn-Washburn Schools Police Department
- Butler Community Colleges Department of Public Safety
- Emporia State University Police and Safety
- Fort Hays State University Police Department
- Johnson County Community College Police Department
- Kansas City Kansas Community College Police Department
- Kansas City Kansas Public Schools Police Department
- Kansas State University Police Department
- Shawnee Mission School District Police Department
- University of Kansas Medical Center Police Department
- University of Kansas Police Department
- Goddard USD 265 Police Department
- Maize USD 266 Police Department
- Topeka USD 501 Police Department
- Washburn University Police Department
- Wichita State University Police Department

== Defunct Agencies ==
- Kansas State Teachers College Police Department
