= Three-tier system (alcohol distribution) =

System for the sale of alcohol in the U.S. put in place after the repeal of Prohibition

The three-tier system of alcohol distribution is the system for distributing alcoholic beverages set up in the United States after the repeal of Prohibition. The three tiers are importers or producers; distributors; and retailers. The basic structure of the system is that producers can sell their products only to wholesale distributors who then sell to retailers, and only retailers may sell to consumers. Producers include brewers, wine makers, distillers and importers. The three-tier system is intended to prohibit tied houses and prevent "disorderly marketing conditions."

Some states chose to become alcoholic beverage control jurisdictions after Prohibition. In these states, part or all of the distribution tier, and sometimes also the retailing tier, are operated by the state government itself (or by contractors operating under its authority) rather than by independent private entities.

The only state with a privately operated retailing and distribution system that does not require any form of three-tier system is the State of Washington. In Washington, retailers may purchase alcoholic beverages directly from producers, may negotiate volume discounts, and may warehouse their inventory themselves. However, the three-tier system largely remains in fact a reality in Washington despite the lack of a law requiring it.

== History and legal justification ==
In 1933 the 18th Amendment was repealed by the Twenty-first Amendment to the United States Constitution. (Previously, the Eighteenth Amendment had outlawed alcohol in the US in 1919 and led to Prohibition in 1920.) Section 2 of the Twenty-first Amendment specifies that the power to control alcohol resides with the states, leaving each state to decide when and how to repeal Prohibition.

After Prohibition, the states began to seek methods to regulate and control the alcohol industry. The states were also eager to devise a method to levy and collect taxes on alcohol producers. Both of these concerns led to the states individually creating environments in which single ownership of all three tiers (production, distribution and retail) was entirely or partly prohibited. As states were left by the 21st Amendment to regulate themselves, alcohol laws and the nature of the three tier system can vary significantly from state to state.

== Exceptions and regulations ==
States have various exceptions to this rule, the most prevalent one being the case of a brewpub, which is simultaneously a producer and retailer, and has no requirement to sell to a distributor. Some states allow an entity to have a part in two of the tiers, letting small breweries act as their own distributor, for example. Many states permit wineries to sell bottles of wine on-site to customers.

Usually producers will give a distributor exclusive rights to market their product within a geographical area, so that there will not, for example, be two distributors of Anheuser-Busch products competing against each other.

Rules also vary according to what kind of relationships each of the tiers can enter into with the other two tiers. For example, a producer may not be allowed to give promotional items or services to a retailer. Another example is that a beer distributor might be responsible for setting up and maintaining draft lines in a restaurant, or may be legally prohibited from doing so, depending on the state.

Also, several states are alcoholic beverage control states – in any of these jurisdictions, state governments maintain a monopoly on the distribution tier of the system (at least for distilled beverages). Some (such as Utah and Pennsylvania) monopolize the distribution and retail tiers. Those that maintain monopolies over the distribution system only (such as Michigan) could still be said to have a three-tier system – in such states, producers sell to the distributor (in these cases, the state as opposed to a private operator) who in turn sells to private retail outlets.

The only substantial exception to the three-tier system is the State of Washington. In November 2011, voters in Washington approved Initiative 1183, which dismantled the state-operated retailing system and removed the legal requirement for a three-tier distribution system for alcoholic beverage sales. Under the modified law, the prior state-operated liquor retailing system was eliminated in favor of heavily taxed private retailing. By a substantial margin, Washington has the highest liquor tax rate in the nation. With a liquor tax rate around $35 per gallon, its liquor tax is about 50% higher than in Oregon, which has the next highest rate. In Washington, retailers may bypass distributors by purchasing directly from producers, may negotiate volume discounts, and may warehouse their inventory themselves. Private retailing began on June 1, 2012. Although private retailing should increase competition in principle, in many cases producers have entered into exclusive marketing agreements with distributors for the market region, to the extent that each brand is often only available from a single distributor in the state (although large retailers such as Costco have been able to take some advantage of the law and in some cases have introduced their own house brands). Contrary to the fears of some in the political process, the number of drunk-driving arrests and alcohol-related motor vehicle accidents actually dropped in the year after the conversion to the new system.

A different type of exception to the three-tier system existed in Oklahoma prior to October 2018, where laws historically mandated a four-tier system for package sales of beer of greater than 3.2% alcohol by weight (4.0% by volume). Brewers in that state were historically prohibited from selling to distributors; they instead were required to sell to brokers, who in turn would sell to distributors. Following the passage of a voter referendum in 2016, the broker and distributor levels were effectively merged effective on October 1, 2018, resulting in the three-tier system common to the rest of the U.S.

== Disputes and criticisms ==
Wine and Spirits Wholesalers of America (WSWA), an influential trade organization and lobby group based in Washington, D.C. that works to oppose initiatives to alter the three-tier model, contends that wholesalers not only sell alcohol but also perform state functions and are in the business of encouraging social responsibility concerning alcohol.

The National Association of Wine Retailers represents the wine retail industry, advocating for the free movement of wine across state lines.

== Use in other markets ==
A similar use of a three-tier system is enforced for tobacco products in some jurisdictions. In June 2017, tobacco wholesalers proposed that the three-tier system also be imposed for recreational marijuana in Massachusetts. They argued that this would improve tax collection enforcement.

There is no direct equivalent in the United Kingdom, occasioning criticism whereby large distributors (such as supermarkets, etc.) may squeeze local, independent beer retailers.

== See also ==
- Granholm v. Heald – a ruling of the Supreme Court of the United States prohibiting states from discriminating against producers in other states when allowing wine producers to ship their products directly to consumers
