= Moist county (Kentucky) =

Classification of counties based on alcohol sales in the US

In Kentucky, a moist county is a county whose regulations in force are between those of a "dry county" (in which the sale of alcoholic beverages is prohibited) and a "wet county" (in which alcohol is sold). The term is typically used for any county that allows alcohol to be sold in certain situations but has limitations on alcohol sales that a normal "wet" county would not have. Some historically "dry" counties are switching to this system to avoid losing money to businesses in other counties when they do not wish to become completely "wet". The term "moist" in itself does not have any specific meaning except that the county is neither completely "wet" nor completely "dry". A "dry" county that contains one or more "wet" cities is typically called "moist".

The term can be used in two different senses:

- Two different statutes allow any dry territory, which can be a dry county or a city located in a dry county, to vote to authorize limited sales of alcoholic beverages by the drink in restaurants. Both statutes require such a restaurant to make at least 70% of its money from food, rather than alcohol, sales. One statute requires that the restaurant seat at least 100 patrons. The other, signed into law in June 2007, requires only 50 seats but prohibits licensed establishments from having a dedicated bar and requires the drinks to be sold in association with a meal. Once a jurisdiction votes for such sales, qualifying restaurants can apply for a permit, which are distributed on a somewhat-limited basis. For example, the Louisville suburban jurisdiction of Oldham County voted to allow such sales in the early 2000s (its county seat of La Grange later approved full package sales in 2012). However, Kentucky's Office of Alcoholic Beverage Control does not use the term "moist county" to describe a county in which such sales are allowed, but instead calls it a "limited" county.
- Officially, a "moist county" is an otherwise-dry county in which a city in the county's jurisdiction has voted to allow full retail sales of alcoholic beverages. The following Kentucky counties fall into that category:

| Dry county | Wet cities |
|---|---|
| Boyle | Danville |
| Boyle | Junction City |
| Caldwell | Princeton |
| Calloway | Murray |
| Carter | Grayson |
| Carter | Olive Hill |
| Clay | Manchester |
| Estill | Irvine |
| Fleming | Flemingsburg |
| Garrard | Lancaster |
| Greenup | Bellefonte |
| Greenup | Flatwoods |
| Greenup | Greenup |
| Greenup | Raceland |
| Greenup | Russell |
| Greenup | South Shore |
| Hardin | Elizabethtown |
| Hardin | Radcliff |
| Hardin | Vine Grove |
| Hart | Horse Cave |
| Henry | Eminence |
| Hopkins | Dawson Springs |
| Hopkins | Earlington |
| Hopkins | Hanson |
| Hopkins | Madisonville |
| Jessamine | Nicholasville |
| Johnson | Paintsville |
| Knox | Corbin |
| Laurel | London |
| Laurel | Corbin |
| Lewis | Vanceburg |
| Logan | Russellville |
| Madison | Richmond |
| Martin | Warfield |
| Montgomery | Mount Sterling |
| Muhlenberg | Central City |
| Oldham | La Grange |
| Pendleton | Falmouth |
| Pike | Pikeville |
| Pulaski | Burnside |
| Pulaski | Somerset |
| Rowan | Morehead |
| Scott | Georgetown |
| Shelby | Shelbyville |
| Simpson | Franklin |
| Todd | Guthrie |
| Warren | Bowling Green |
| Washington | Springfield |
| Webster | Providence Sebree |
| Whitley | Corbin |
| Whitley | Williamsburg |

Note that once a city votes itself fully wet, Kentucky state law mandates a 60-day period, starting on the date that the election results are certified, before vendors can apply for licenses to sell distilled spirits and wine. At the end of that period, the state will then advertise in that city's newspaper of record to announce the number of licenses that will be granted. However, beer licenses are not subject to quotas, and can be applied for once the city enacts a governing ordinance.
