= Granholm v. Heald =

- Supreme Court of the United States

Argued December 7, 2004 Decided May 16, 2005
- Full case name: Jennifer M. Granholm, Governor of Michigan, et al., Petitioners v. Eleanor Heald, et al.; Michigan Beer & Wine Wholesalers Association, Petitioner v. Eleanor Heald, et al.; Juanita Swedenburg, et al., Petitioners v. Edward D. Kelly, Chairman, New York Division of Alcoholic Beverage Control, State Liquor Authority, et al.
- Citations: 544 U.S. 460 (more) 125 S. Ct. 1885; 161 L. Ed. 2d 796; 73 U.S.L.W. 4321; 05 Cal. Daily Op. Serv. 4068; 2005 Daily Journal D.A.R. 5561; 18 Fla. L. Weekly Fed. S 263; 2005 U.S. LEXIS 4174

Case history
- Prior: Heald v. Engler, 342 F.3d 517 (6th Cir. 2003); rehearing and suggestion for rehearing en banc denied (Nov. 4, 2003); cert. granted, 541 U.S. 1062 (2004). Swedenburg v. Kelly, 358 F.3d 223 (2d Cir. 2004); cert. granted, 541 U.S. 1062 (2004).

Holding
- The 21st Amendment grant of regulatory power to the states over alcoholic beverages does not abrogate the Dormant Commerce Clause. State laws prohibiting direct sales of wine and other alcoholic beverages by out-of-state wineries and other producers and permitting such sales by in-state producers are unconstitutional. Sixth Circuit ruling striking Michigan statute affirmed.

Court membership
- Chief Justice William Rehnquist Associate Justices John P. Stevens · Sandra Day O'Connor; Antonin Scalia · Anthony Kennedy; David Souter · Clarence Thomas; Ruth Bader Ginsburg · Stephen Breyer

Case opinions
- Majority: Kennedy, joined by Scalia, Souter, Ginsburg, Breyer
- Dissent: Stevens, joined by O'Connor
- Dissent: Thomas, joined by Rehnquist, Stevens, O'Connor

Laws applied
- Dormant Commerce Clause; U.S. Const. amend. XXI

Granholm v. Heald, 544 U.S. 460 (2005), along with its companion case, Swedenburg v. Kelly, 544 U.S. 460 (2005), was a case in which the Supreme Court of the United States ruled that laws in New York and Michigan permitting in-state wineries to ship wine directly to consumers but prohibited out-of-state wineries from doing the same were unconstitutional. The case was notable because the arguments centered on the rarely-invoked Twenty-first Amendment to the Constitution, ratified in 1933, which ended Prohibition.

== Background ==
Granholm and Swedenburg were the consolidation of an eight-year fight by small wineries against laws barring out-of-state wineries from direct shipping products to consumers. Although direct shipments to consumers constituted only about 2% of wine sales in the United States (whose total sales were $21.6 billion in 2003), direct sales were thought to be an opportunity for growth, especially for smaller wineries.

== Plaintiffs ==
Terry Speizer founded the Domaine Alfred Winery in 1994 in the Edna Valley of San Luis Obispo, California. Speizer was fascinated by Pinot Noir and researched the best varieties of the grape in Dijon, France before planting them in the Edna Valley. He took significant risks by shifting from Chardonnay production to Pinot Noir. His winery received the highest scores ever awarded to a winery in the Edna Valley. At its peak, the winery produced 3,000 cases of wine a year, but this was not enough for wholesalers to take up his product.

Joining Speizer as plaintiffs were 13 Michigan wine consumers and journalists who were frustrated by Michigan's rigid direct shipment laws. Among them was Eleanor and Ray Heald, professional wine critics, who wrote wine reviews for major publications. The direct shipment laws prevented them from sampling high-ranked wines like Speizers. This also cost them a loss of potential income.

== Michigan's law ==
Michigan used a three-tier system where winemakers are authorized to sell their products to wholesalers. Wholesalers are permitted to sell the wines to retailers and only retailers can sell to consumers. Wines made in one of the 40 in-state wineries, however, were allowed to directly sell their wines to consumers, including via mail. Since Speizer's wines were not made within the state, he could not directly ship his wine to interested Michigan consumers.

The system made the large wholesalers very powerful in the wine industry because if a state's wholesalers decided not to purchase wine from a particular winery, that winery would be completely shut out of the state's market. Wholesalers generally avoid carrying small wineries' products because of their inability to meet economies of scale.

== Lower courts ==
Plaintiffs sued the Michigan Attorney General and Michigan Liquor Control Commission officials under § 1983 for violating their federal constitutional rights by differentiating between in-state and out-of-state wineries to the latter's detriment. Defendants and the Michigan Wine & Beer Wholesalers Association (who intervened in the suit) filed a motion for summary judgement. The District Court granted the motion. The U.S. Court of Appeals for the Sixth Circuit reversed, finding Plaintiffs have sufficiently shown Michigan's regulations were discriminatory and the state's asserted interests did not "advance the traditional 'core concerns' of the Twenty-first Amendment."

Juanita Swedenburg, a Virginia winemaker, and four other plaintiffs made the same argument in a separate case against the government of New York. The U.S. Court of Appeals for the Second Circuit ruled against those plaintiffs, and the Supreme Court granted the review petition to resolve the circuit split.

== Arguments ==
Plaintiffs argued the restriction violated the Constitution's Dormant Commerce Clause doctrine.

The Commerce Clause of Article 1 of the Constitution grants Congress the power:

To regulate Commerce with foreign Nations, and among the several States, and with the Indian Tribes.

Normally, if Congress passes a law pursuant to its Commerce power, the Supremacy Clause preempts any contrary state law. The Dormant Commerce Clause works differently. The Supreme Court has repeatedly held the very presence of the Commerce Clause prohibits states from passing laws that discriminate or burden the passage of interstate commerce.

Michigan and New York's attorneys' arguments relied on Section 2 of the Twenty-First Amendment which reads:

The transportation or importation into any State, Territory, or possession of the United States for delivery or use therein of intoxicating liquors, in violation of the laws thereof, is hereby prohibited.

The states argued that Section 2 of the Twenty-first Amendment granted them unlimited power to regulate liquor. One of the states' justifications for the laws was that regulating out-of-state wineries from directly shipping wine to consumers might hinder the shipment of alcohol to underage minors, which would serve a valid state purpose.

== Decision ==
=== Opinion of the court ===
In a 5–4 decision, written by Justice Kennedy, the Supreme Court ruled the states' laws were unconstitutional. The Twenty-first Amendment only restored the states with the alcohol regulation powers they held before the Eighteenth Amendment's ratification. The majority cited a long list of pre-Eighteenth Amendment precedents where the Court struck down states' regulations on out-of-state alcohol transportation for violating the Dormant Commerce Clause. The Twenty-first Amendment's passage did not overrule those precedents. Thus, states have the power to regulate alcohol however they wished, including banning alcoholic beverages entirely within the state. But states cannot utilize methods violating the Dormant Commerce Clause.

=== Justice Stevens' dissent ===
Justice Stevens noted that alcohol consumption was still viewed as a vice by most of society when the Twenty-first Amendment was ratified. Thus, the goal of § 2 was to allow states to pass the same regulations that Congress could under the Eighteenth Amendment. Furthermore, many states passed laws that would be deemed discriminatory under the majority's standard but were nevertheless not struck down. Therefore, according to Justice Stevens, viewing alcohol as just another article of commerce as modern people do is incorrect.

=== Justice Thomas' dissent ===
Justice Thomas focused on the Webb-Kenyon Act, prohibiting the shipping or transporting of alcohol into a state in violation of the state's laws, and Supreme Court precedents elaborating on it to conclude that the Twenty-first Amendment created an exception for alcohol from other articles of interstate commerce. Since New York and Michigan's regulations fell under the Webb-Kenyon Act's terms, the regulations did not violate the Dormant Commerce Clause according to Justice Thomas.

== Aftermath ==
Michigan's liquor control board announced that it would recommend to the state government to ban all direct wine sales to consumers, which would join the 15 other states that currently ban all such sales. Currently, Michigan allows out-of-state wineries to obtain the same license that in-state wineries may obtain to ship wine directly to consumers. Wineries may not direct ship to a consumer more than 1,500 9-liter cases, or 13,500 liters total in a year. The direct shipper must verify using a Michigan or federally issued license that the recipient is at least 21 years old and record the name, address, date of birth, and telephone number of the purchaser if someone other than the purchaser receives the shipment.

Since the ruling, many more states have allowed direct shipping from out-of-state wineries. According to the Wine Institute, a public policy advocacy association of California wineries, 47 states permitted at least some form of direct shipping from wineries to consumers, as of August 2021. Different states have enacted different regulations. An editorial article on the commercial wine selling web site Appellation America states that many of the conditions in those regulations are so complex or so expensive that they discourage wineries from complying.

Terry Speizer sold Domaine Alfred Winery in 2008. He then bought a 120-acre property in Edna Valley; and in 2013, when his non-compete clause from Domaine Alfred's sale expired, he began Speizer Family Farms and decided to re-enter the winemaking business.

In March 2011, a bill was introduced in the US House of Representatives that would explicitly allow states to regulate alcohol products from outside of the state differently from those produced within the state.

== See also ==
- List of United States Supreme Court cases, volume 544
- List of United States Supreme Court cases
- Twenty-first Amendment to the United States Constitution
