= Alcohol laws of Oklahoma =

Location of Oklahoma

Oklahoma allows any establishment (grocery stores, gas stations, pharmacies, etc.) with a beer and wine license to sell beer and wine up to 15% ABV, under refrigeration.

Minors under the age of 21 are not permitted to possess or purchase alcohol; however, consumption in a "private setting" is not prohibited by Oklahoma law. Minors may not have a blood alcohol level of more than .02%.

== History ==
When Oklahoma became a state in 1907, the state constitution included the prohibition of alcohol. In 1933 when the Federal government repealed the 18th Amendment, Oklahoma did not ratify the new 21st Amendment and instead approved the sale of beer containing not more than 3.2% alcohol by weight with the Oklahoma Beer Act of 1933. On April 7, 1959, the legislature voted on House Bill 825, which repealed prohibition and created the Alcohol Control Board, known now as the ABLE commission (Alcohol Beverage Laws Enforcement). Alcohol stronger than 3.2% abw could only by sold by a licensed retail package store at room temperature. Any establishment with a beer license could sell 3.2% abw beer regulated by Oklahoma's ABLE commission.

In 1976 Oklahoma's distribution laws, commonly known as reverse franchising or the open wholesale system, prompted a local distributor to sue a major domestic brewer for turning down an order and responded explaining that the brewing company already had a distributor in the same territory. An Oklahoma Supreme Court judge issued an opinion ruling that the brewing company violated Oklahoma's distribution laws that prohibited franchising among distributors. In response, most major domestic brewers discontinued selling strong beer in Oklahoma in the late 1970s, only selling 3.2% abw beer since it was not regulated by ABLE. This moratorium continued until the early 2010s when some of the major domestic brewing companies returned a few of their products back to liquor store shelves due to strong demand by Oklahoma consumers.

On Tuesday, September 18, 1984, Oklahoma became the 49th state to allow liquor by the drink with the passage of State Question 563 with 51% of the vote.

In the 2016 November general elections, Oklahoma overwhelmingly passed State Question 792, which was the most comprehensive reform of Oklahoma's alcoholic beverage laws. The reform allowed grocery stores, convenience stores, pharmacies and other establishments to sell strong beer and wine, allows liquor stores to sell cold beverages as well as non-alcoholic items, and implemented a territorial franchise wholesale system which encouraged major domestic brewers and other craft brewers to begin selling in Oklahoma for the first time in decades.

== Liquor sales ==
An Oklahoma statute prohibiting the sale of "nonintoxicating" 3.2% beer to males under the age of 21 but allowed females over the age of 18 was challenged as a violation of the Equal Protection Clause in the District Court for the Western District of Oklahoma in 1971. The district court's ruling was appealed to the US Supreme Court. Under its ruling in Craig v. Boren, the Court found the law to be unconstitutional and it was struck down.

Under Oklahoma law, it is a felony to provide alcoholic beverages to the "mentally deficient", the intoxicated, and persons under 21 years of age. Although low-point beer may not be sold where unclothed persons or persons with exposed private parts are present on the same premises, alcohol sales are available by the glass if permitted by the county. Conviction of this crime is a misdemeanor punishable by a fine of up to $500 for each offense.

=== Off-premises ===
Sunday packaged liquor (off-premises) sales are legal in 7 counties: Oklahoma, Tulsa, Cleveland, Creek, Kingfisher, Muskogee and Washington. Counties can approve Sunday liquor sales through a special election. Sales are prohibited on Thanksgiving and Christmas Day. Wine and beer for consumption off-premises may not be sold between 2:00 a.m. and 6:00 a.m. Hours of sale for off-premise beer and wine may differ in some rural counties. Liquor stores are permitted to operate between 8:00 a.m. and Midnight Monday through Saturday and from Noon to Midnight on Sundays in counties where permitted.

Delivery of alcoholic beverages by licensed businesses (restaurants, grocery stores and package liquor stores) is legal.

People who have been convicted of a felony or any alcohol-related crime may not obtain a license to sell packaged alcohol.

=== On-premises ===
Alcohol may not be sold for consumption on-premises or allowed to be consumed in places licensed to sell alcohol between 2:00 a.m. and 7:00 a.m. This crime is punishable by a fine of up to $500 and up to 6 months' imprisonment.

Licensed vendors may not advertise happy hours, serve more than two beverages at a time to a customer, give a discount to a person or group of persons, or permit the play of games that involve drinking.

As of June 2018, all 77 counties allow liquor by the drink. The last 14 counties that only allowed private bottle clubs as well as beer taverns and restaurants permitted to sell only low-point beer (3.2% alcohol by weight) voted to go wet prior to new laws that went into effect on October 1 that eliminated low-point beer. Since off-premises sales are allowed in all 77 counties, no dry counties exist in Oklahoma, much like the neighboring state of Missouri, and unlike its neighboring states of Kansas, Arkansas, and Texas.

== Open container ==
=== In public ===
It is illegal to consume or inhale intoxicating beverages in public in Oklahoma. It also is illegal to be drunk or intoxicated in any public place. These crimes are punishable by a fine of between $10 and $100 and between 5 and 30 days of imprisonment. These crimes may cost more as fines to individual cities rather than the state (e.g. Stillwater and Oklahoma City).

=== Driving ===
Opened bottles or any alcoholic beverage with a broken seal may not be stored in an area of the vehicle accessible to the driver. As a result, Oklahoma meets the provisions of the federal Transportation Equity Act for the 21st Century for prohibitions of open containers in vehicles.

== DUI ==
Like every other state in the United States, driving under the influence is a crime in Oklahoma, and is subject to a great number of regulations. It is illegal to drive with a blood or breath alcohol content of 0.08% or more, or while under the influence of alcohol or any other intoxicating substance. For any person under 21 years of age, Oklahoma has a zero tolerance policy. The breath alcohol limit for such a person is 0.02%, and any measurable level of alcohol by a breathalyzer is an automatic DUI and driver's license revocation. This crime is punishable by a fine of up $1,000 US dollars and up to 1 year imprisonment after being evaluated by a person certified by the Department of Mental Health and Substance Abuse.

== Minors, adults under age 21, and alcohol in Oklahoma ==
It is a misdemeanor for persons under 21 years of age to give the impression that they are older for the purpose of obtaining alcoholic beverages. Punishment for this crime is a fine of up to $300 and up to 30 days of community service. Furthermore, the driving license of the convicted individual will be revoked for 6 months for the first offense, 1 year for the second offense, and 2 years for all subsequent offenses, alternatively for any offense they can have their license revoked until they reach 21 years of age at the discretion of the judge.

Landowners cannot lawfully permit a person under 21 years of age to consume alcohol on their property. Punishment for this crime is a fine between $2,500 and $5,000 and up to 5 years of imprisonment.

If a minor is pulled over and charged by an officer to be in violation of any alcohol law, a copy of the violation will be mailed to the legal guardian(s) of the child within three days.
