= Alcohol law =

Law pertaining to alcoholic beverages

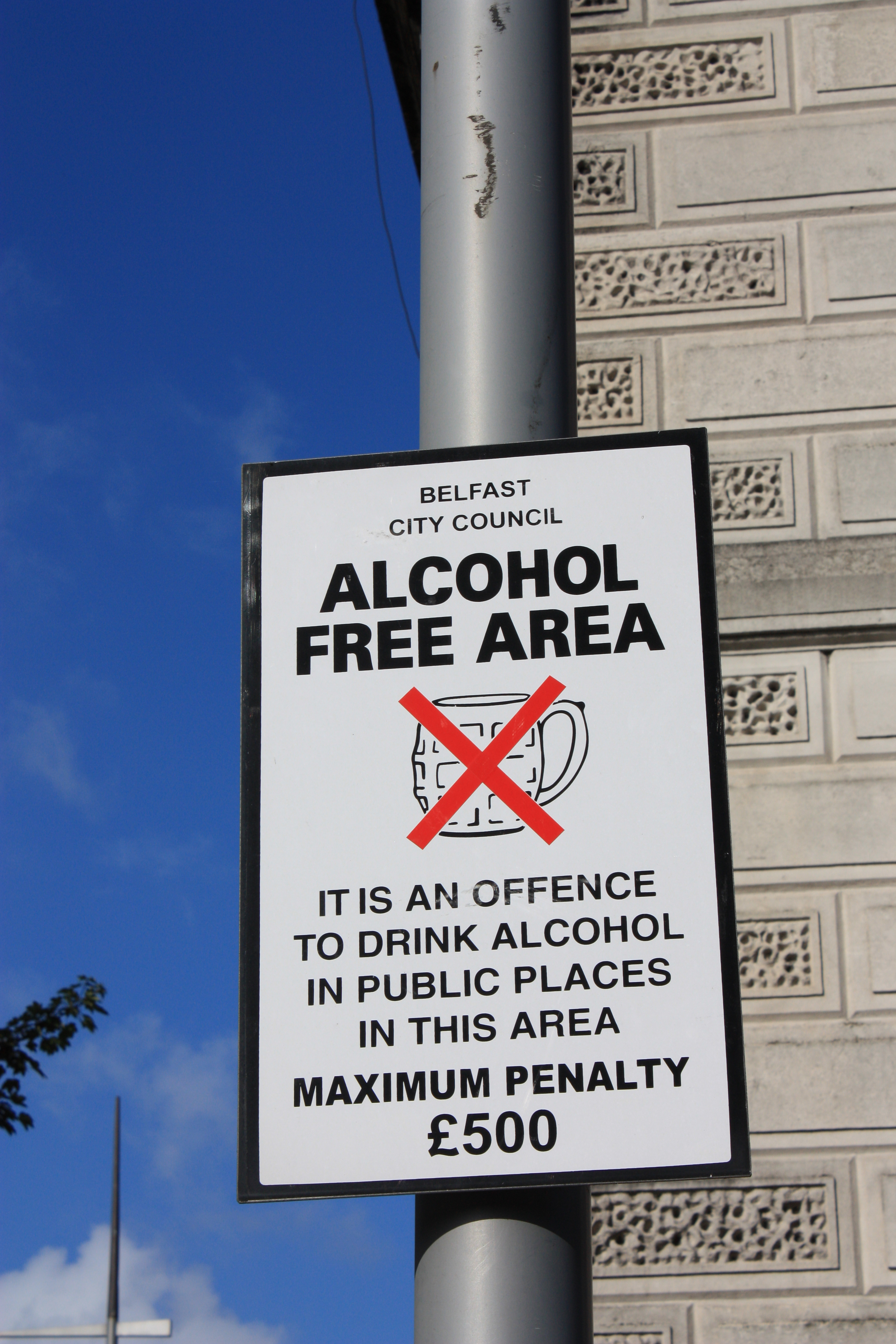
A warning sign in Belfast, Northern Ireland

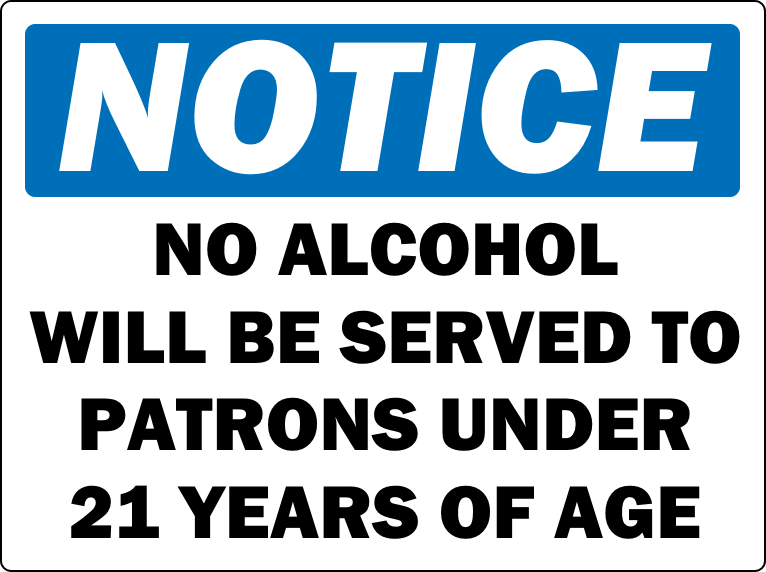
Information that no alcohol is served under the age of 21 (typical in US bars)

Alcohol laws are laws relating to manufacture, use, as being under the influence of and sale of alcohol (also known formally as ethanol) or alcoholic beverages. Common alcoholic beverages include beer, wine, (hard) cider, and distilled spirits (e.g., vodka, rum, gin). Definition of alcoholic beverage varies internationally, e.g., the United States defines an alcoholic beverage as "any beverage in liquid form which contains not less than one-half of one percent of alcohol by volume". Alcohol laws can restrict those who can produce alcohol, those who can buy it (often with minimum age restrictions and laws against selling to an already intoxicated person), when one can buy it (with hours of serving or days of selling set out), labelling and advertising, the types of alcoholic beverage that can be sold (e.g., some stores can only sell beer and wine), where one can consume it (e.g., drinking in public is not legal in many parts of the US), what activities are prohibited while intoxicated (e.g., drunk driving), and where one can buy it. In some cases, laws have even prohibited the use and sale of alcohol entirely.

== Temperance movement ==
The temperance movement is a social movement against the consumption of alcoholic beverages. Participants in the movement typically criticize alcohol intoxication or promote complete abstinence (teetotalism), with leaders emphasizing alcohol's negative effects on health, personality, and family life. Typically the movement promotes alcohol education, as well as demands new laws against the selling of alcoholic drinks, or those regulating the availability of alcohol, or those completely prohibiting it. During the 19th and early 20th centuries, the Temperance Movement became prominent in many countries, particularly English-speaking and Scandinavian ones, and it led to Prohibition in the United States from 1920 to 1933.

== Alcohol laws by country ==
- Australia
- Germany
- Hong Kong
- India
- Turkey
- United States

=== Alcohol licensing laws by country ===
- United Kingdom
- Ireland

== Prohibition ==
Some countries forbid alcoholic beverages or have forbidden them in the past. People trying to get around prohibition turn to smuggling of alcohol – known as bootlegging or rum-running – or make moonshine, a distilled beverage in an unlicensed still.

=== Canada ===
Canada imposed prohibition at the beginning of the 20th century, but repealed it in the 1920s.

=== India ===
In India, manufacture, sale or consumption of alcohol is prohibited in the states of Bihar, Gujarat, Manipur and Nagaland, as well as the union territory of Lakshadweep. Prohibition has become controversial in Gujarat, following a July 2009 incident in which widespread poisoning resulted from alcohol that had been sold illegally.

All Indian states observe dry days on major religious festivals/occasions depending on the popularity of the festival in that region. Dry days are specific days when the sale of alcohol is banned, although consumption is permitted. Dry days are also observed on voting days. Dry days are fixed by the respective state government. National holidays such as Republic Day (26 January), Independence Day (15 August) and Gandhi Jayanthi (2 October) are usually dry days throughout India.

=== Nordic countries ===
Finland and Norway had a period of alcohol prohibition in the early 20th century.

In Sweden, prohibition was heavily discussed, but never introduced, replaced by strict rationing and later by more lax regulation, which included allowing alcohol to be sold on Saturdays.

Following the end of prohibition, government alcohol monopolies were established with detailed restrictions and high taxes. Some of these restrictions have since been lifted. For example, supermarkets in Finland were allowed to sell only fermented beverages with an alcohol content up to 4.7% ABV, but Alko, the government monopoly, is allowed to sell wine and spirits.

The alcohol law in Finland was changed in 2018, allowing grocery stores to sell beverages with an alcohol content up to 5.5% ABV. The law was again changed in 2024 to allow fermented beverages up to 8% ABV to be sold in grocery stores.

This is also the case with the Norwegian Vinmonopolet and the Swedish Systembolaget (though in Sweden the limit for allowed ABV in supermarkets is 3.5%.)

=== Philippines ===
Under the Omnibus Election Code, the Commission on Elections can impose a prohibition on the sale and purchasing of alcoholic and intoxicating drinks on the election day and the day before. Certain establishments catering to foreigners can obtain an exemption.

=== United States ===
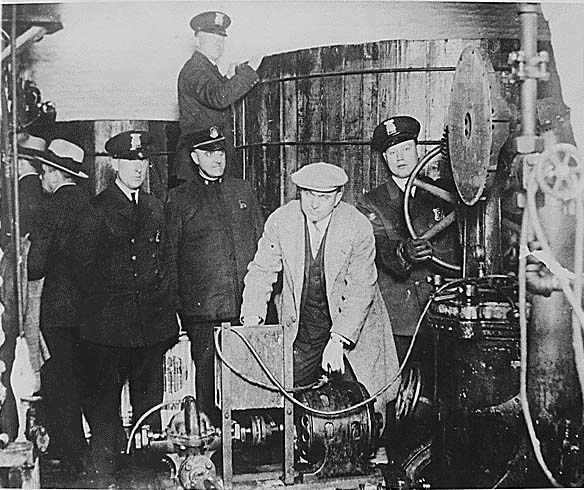
Detroit police inspecting equipment found in a clandestine brewery during the Prohibition era

In the United States, there was an attempt from 1919 to 1933 to eliminate the drinking of alcoholic beverages by means of a national prohibition of their manufacture and sale. This period became known as the Prohibition era. During this time, the 18th Amendment to the Constitution of the United States made the manufacture, sale, and transportation of alcoholic beverages illegal throughout the United States.

Prohibition led to the unintended consequence of causing widespread disrespect for the law, as many people procured alcoholic beverages from illegal sources. In this way, a lucrative business was created for illegal producers and sellers of alcohol, which led to the development of organized crime. As a result, Prohibition became extremely unpopular, which ultimately led to the repeal of the 18th Amendment in 1933 via the adoption of the 21st Amendment to the Constitution.

Prior to national Prohibition, beginning in the late 19th century, many states and localities had enacted Prohibition within their jurisdictions. After the repeal of the 18th Amendment, some localities (known as dry counties) continue to ban the sale of alcohol, but often not possession or consumption.

Between 1832 and 1953, US federal law prohibited the sale of alcohol to Native Americans. The federal legislation was repealed in 1953, and within a few years, most tribes passed their own prohibition laws. As of 2007, 63% of the federally recognized tribes in the lower 48 states had legalized alcohol sales on their reservations.

=== Majority-Muslim countries ===
Some majority-Muslim countries, such as Saudi Arabia, Kuwait, Iran, Somalia, Libya, Yemen, etc. prohibit the production, sale, and consumption of alcoholic beverages either entirely or for its Muslim citizens because they are considered haram (forbidden) in Islam. Alcohol was illegal in Sudan but, it was legalized for non-Muslims in July 2020. Other Muslim countries have it either illegal in certain parts or by non-Muslims.

==== Afghanistan ====
Alcohol is completely illegal in Afghanistan. Alcohol, especially wine, was popular for thousands of years in region currently known as Afghanistan. The Taliban banned alcohol during its rule from 1996 to 2001 as well as after the Afghan government collapsed in 2021. Prior to the collapse of the Afghan government, alcohol licenses were given to journalists and tourists and bringing up to 2 liters (½ gallon) was legal. There does however remain a large black market for alcohol in Afghanistan, especially in Kabul and Herat.

==== Algeria ====
What is now known as Algeria has been known for its wine for thousands of years. In Algeria, it is illegal to drink alcohol in public. Alcohol can be drunk in restaurants, bars and hotels.

==== Bangladesh ====
In Bangladesh, alcohol is illegal for Muslims. It is legal for non-Muslims to drink with a permit. It is only legal for Muslims "under medical circumstances" with a doctor's permit. In 2022, the laws were revised to allow hotels, restaurants, and outlets that serve food as well as display and sell alcohol to apply for liquor sale licenses. Those over 21 can apply for a drinking permit, while Muslims must get a prescription from a doctor with at least an associate professor rank.

==== Egypt ====
Ancient Egypt was widely known for its beer. In Egypt, drinking alcohol is illegal in public as well as shops and sales are banned for Muslims during Ramadan. Alcohol is legal in bars, hotels and tourist facilities approved by the Minister of Tourism.

==== Indonesia ====
Alcohol is legal in Indonesia, but illegal consuming in public and Aceh. Alcohol can be purchased at restaurants, bars, hotels, and other licensed establishments.

==== Iran ====
Prior to the establishment of the Islamic republic, alcohol was accessible in Iran. Ancient Persia was known for its wine and it was even common for Saffarid and Samanid rulers. After the Iranian revolution in 1979, alcohol became completely illegal for Muslims, however there is a major black market and underground scene for alcohol. A popular moonshine is Aragh sagi, distilled from raisins. Smuggling alcohol into Iran is highly illegal and is punishable by death. The only legal alcohol in Iran is home production for recognized non-Muslim minorities such as Armenians, Assyrians, and Zoroastrians. The Jewish community in Iran is also allowed to produce and drink its own wine for the Sabbath.

==== Iraq ====
Mesopotamia, now known as Iraq, is a region that is one of the oldest producers of beer. Buying alcohol is especially prevalent in larger cities by shops owned by Christians, especially in Baghdad. Parts ruled by the Islamic State of Iraq and the Levant completely banned alcohol, with a death penalty being enforced for alcohol consumption. In 2016, the Iraqi parliament passed a law banning alcohol, with a fine of 25,000,000 IQD.

As of March 2025, alcohol is still sold in Baghdad.

==== Jordan ====
Alcohol is legal in Jordan, however public drinking is illegal. Restaurants, bars, hotels, etc. serve alcohol legally.

==== Malaysia ====
Alcohol is mostly legal in Malaysia with the exceptions for Muslims.

==== Morocco ====
Although alcohol is legal in Morocco, it is illegal to drink in public. Alcohol can be drunk in hotels, bars and licensed tourist areas. There is also a separate section in supermarkets for alcohol.

==== Pakistan ====
After its independence in 1947, Pakistani law was fairly liberal regarding liquor laws. Major cities had a culture of drinking, and alcohol was readily available until the 1970s when prohibition was introduced for Muslim citizens. However it remains widely available in urban Pakistan through bootleggers and also through the diplomatic staff of some minor countries. Advertising alcohol isn't illegal, although cultural taboos often prevent people from talking about it in public. Foreigners and non-Muslims are less likely to be barred from buying alcohol and some local producers with special licenses will even assist them with the purchase.

==== Somalia ====
Alcohol is illegal in both Somalia and the autonomous Somaliland. During the Italian Somalia period, rum was produced and continued until the fall of Siad Barre's government in 1991.

==== Sudan ====
Alcohol is illegal for Muslims in Sudan. In 2020, Sudan legalized private consumption of alcohol by non-Muslims.

==== Syria ====
Alcohol is legal in Syria, however in parts ruled by the Islamic State of Iraq and the Levant, it was illegal with a penalty of death.

==== Tunisia ====
Alcohol is completely legal in Tunisia, however, sales are banned on Fridays as well as during Ramadan.

==== United Arab Emirates ====
Prior to 2020, a license was required to handle alcohol, whether it be drinking, selling or transporting. It is illegal for Muslims to drink. Alcohol is completely illegal in the emirate of Sharjah. In 2020, the license requirement was removed for authorized areas. Only Non-Muslims are allowed to drink, the licence is automatically rejected for muslims.

==== Yemen ====
Alcohol is illegal in Yemen. Prior to the Yemeni Civil War, it was legal for tourists in hotels in the cities of Aden and Sana'a.

== Alcohol-related crime ==
Alcohol-related crime refers to criminal activities that involve alcohol use as well as violations of regulations covering the sale or use of alcohol; in other words, activities violating the alcohol laws. Some crimes are uniquely tied to alcohol, such as public intoxication or underage drinking, while others are simply more likely to occur together with alcohol consumption. Underage drinking and drunk driving are the most prevalent alcohol-specific offenses in the United States and a major problem in many, if not most, countries worldwide. Similarly, arrests for alcohol-related crimes constitute a high proportion of all arrests made by police in the U.S. and elsewhere.

== Taxation and regulation of production ==
In most countries, the commercial production of alcoholic beverages requires a license from the government, which then levies a tax upon these beverages. In many countries, alcoholic beverages may be produced in the home for personal use without a license or tax.

=== Taxation ===
Alcoholic beverages are subject to excise taxes. Additionally, they fall under different jurisdiction than other consumables in many countries, with highly specific regulations and licensing on alcohol content, methods of production, and retail and restaurant sales. Alcohol tax is an excise tax, and while a sin tax or demerit tax, is a significant source of revenue for governments. The U.S. government collected $5.8 billion in 2009. In history, the Whiskey Rebellion was caused by the introduction of an alcohol tax to fund the newly formed U.S. federal government. Pigou listed alcohol taxes as an example Pigouvian tax.

=== Minimum price ===
As taxation, minimum unit pricing is an effective measure to reduce alcohol consumption and harms. It mostly affects heaviest consumers from deprived groups, thus reducing health inequalities. It has been successfully implemented by several countries.

=== Health warnings ===
Warning label for pregnant women on alcoholic beverages

Alcohol packaging warning messages are warning messages that appear on the packaging of alcoholic drinks concerning their health effects. They have been implemented in an effort to enhance the public's awareness of the harmful effects of consuming alcoholic beverages, especially with respect to fetal alcohol syndrome and alcohol's carcinogenic properties. In general, warnings used in different countries try to emphasize the same messages. Such warnings have been required in alcohol advertising for many years. For example, in the US, since 1989, all packaging of alcoholic products must contain a health warning from the Surgeon General.

=== Denmark ===
In Denmark, home production of wine and beer is not regulated. Home distillation of spirits is legal but not common because it is subject to the same tax as spirits sold commercially. Danish alcohol taxes are significantly lower than in Sweden and Norway, but higher than those of most other European countries.

=== Singapore ===
In Singapore, alcohol production is regulated by Singapore Customs. Up to 30 liters (7.9 U.S. gallons) of beer, wine, and cider per month can be produced at home without a license. Alcohol distillation is only allowed with a commercial license.

=== United Kingdom ===
In the United Kingdom, HM Revenue and Customs issues distilling licenses, but people may produce beer and wine for personal consumption without a license.

=== United States ===
The production of distilled beverages is regulated and taxed. The Bureau of Alcohol, Tobacco, Firearms, and Explosives and the Alcohol and Tobacco Tax and Trade Bureau (formerly a single organization called the Bureau of Alcohol, Tobacco and Firearms) enforce federal laws and regulations related to alcohol.

In most of the American states, individuals may produce wine and beer for personal consumption (but not for sale) in amounts [usually] of up to 100 gallons per adult per year, but no more than 200 gallons per household per year.

The illegal (i.e., unlicensed) production of liquor in the United States is commonly referred to as "bootlegging." Illegally produced liquor (popularly called "moonshine" or "white lightning") is not aged and contains a high percentage of alcohol.

== Restrictions on sale and possession ==
Alcoholic drinks are available only from licensed shops in many countries, and in some countries, strong alcoholic drinks are sold only by a government-operated alcohol monopoly.

=== Scotland ===
The Alcohol (Minimum Pricing) (Scotland) Act 2012 is an Act of the Scottish Parliament, which introduces a statutory minimum price for alcohol, initially 50p per unit, as an element in the programme to counter alcohol problems. The government introduced the Act to discourage excessive drinking. As a price floor, the Act is expected to increase the cost of the lowest-cost alcoholic beverages. The Act was passed with the support of the Scottish National Party, the Conservatives, the Liberal Democrats and the Greens. The opposition, Scottish Labour, refused to support the legislation because the Act failed to claw back an estimated £125m windfall profit from alcohol retailers. In April 2019, it was reported that, despite the legislation, consumption of alcohol in Scotland had increased.

=== Nordic countries ===
In each of the Nordic countries, except Denmark, the government has a monopoly on the sale of liquor.

The state-run vendor is called Systembolaget in Sweden, Vinmonopolet in Norway, Alko in Finland, Vínbúð in Iceland, and Rúsdrekkasøla Landsins in the Faroe Islands. The first such monopoly was in Falun in the 19th century.

The governments of these countries claim that the purpose of these monopolies is to reduce the consumption of alcohol. These monopolies have had success in the past, but since joining the European Union it has been difficult to curb the importation of liquor, legal or illegal, from other EU countries. That has made the monopolies less effective in reducing excessive drinking.

There is an ongoing debate over whether to retain these state-run monopolies.

==== Norway ====
In Norway, beers with an alcohol content of 4.74% by volume or less can be legally sold in grocery stores. Stronger beers, wines, and spirits can only be bought at government monopoly vendors. All alcoholic beverages can be bought at licensed bars and restaurants, but they must be consumed on the premises.

At the local grocery store, alcohol can only be bought before 8 p.m. (6 p.m. on Saturdays, municipalities can set stricter regulations). And the government monopoly vendors close at 6 p.m. Monday–Friday and 4 p.m. on Saturdays. On Sundays, no alcohol can be bought, except in bars.

Norway levies some of the heaviest taxes in the world on alcoholic beverages, particularly on spirits. These taxes are levied on top of a 25% VAT on all goods and services. For example, 700 mL of Absolut Vodka currently retails at 300+ NOK.

==== Sweden ====
In Sweden, beer with a low alcohol content (called folköl, 2.25% to 3.5% alcohol by weight) can be sold in regular stores to anyone aged 18 or over, but beverages with a high alcohol content can only be sold by government-run vendors to people aged 20 or older, or by licensed facilities such as restaurants and bars, where the age limit is 18. Alcoholic drinks bought at these licensed facilities must be consumed on the premises; nor is it allowed to bring and consume your own alcoholic beverages bought elsewhere.

=== North America ===
==== Canada ====
In most Canadian provinces, there is a very tightly held government monopoly on the sale of alcohol. Two examples of this are the Liquor Control Board of Ontario, and the Liquor Distribution Branch of British Columbia. Government control and supervision of the sale of alcohol was a compromise devised in the 1920s between "drys" and "wets" for the purpose of ending Prohibition in Canada. Some provinces have moved away from government monopoly. In Alberta, privately owned liquor stores exist, and in Quebec a limited number of wines and liquors can be purchased at dépanneurs and grocery stores.

Canada has some of the highest excise taxes on alcohol in the world. These taxes are a source of income for governments and are also meant to discourage drinking. (See Taxation in Canada.) The province of Quebec has the lowest overall prices of alcohol in Canada.

Restrictions on the sale of alcohol vary from province to province. In Alberta, changes introduced in 2008 included a ban on "happy hour," minimum prices, and a limit on the number of drinks a person can buy in a bar or pub at one time after 1 a.m.

==== United States ====
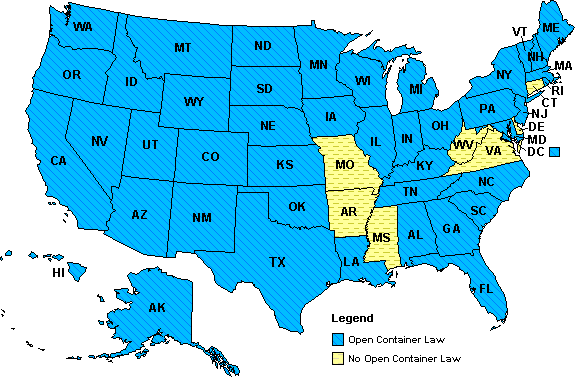
Map of open container laws in the United States by state, as of September 2007

In the United States, the sale of alcoholic beverages is controlled by the individual states, by the counties or parishes within each state, and by local jurisdictions. In many states, alcohol can only be sold by staff qualified to serve responsibly through alcohol server training. A county that prohibits the sale of alcohol is known as a dry county. In some states, liquor sales are prohibited on Sunday by a blue law.

The places where alcohol may be sold or possessed, like all other alcohol restrictions, vary from state to state. Some states, like Louisiana, Missouri, and Connecticut, have very permissive alcohol laws, whereas other states, like Kansas and Oklahoma, have very strict alcohol laws.

Many states require that liquor may be sold only in liquor stores. In Nevada, Missouri, and Louisiana, state law does not specify the locations where alcohol may be sold.

In 18 alcoholic beverage control states, the state has a monopoly on the sale of liquor. For example, in most of North Carolina, beer and wine may be purchased in retail stores, but distilled spirits are only available at state ABC (Alcohol Beverage Control) stores. In Maryland, distilled spirits are available in liquor stores except in Montgomery County, where they are sold only by the county.

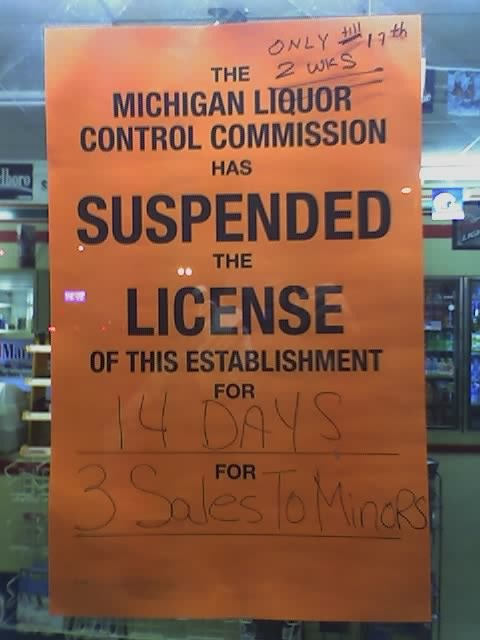
This convenience store in Michigan had its retail license suspended for two weeks because it sold alcoholic beverages to minors.

Most states follow a three-tier system in which producers cannot sell directly to retailers, but must instead sell to distributors, who in turn sell to retailers. Exceptions often exist for brewpubs (pubs which brew their own beer) and wineries, which are allowed to sell their products directly to consumers.

Most states also do not allow open containers of alcohol inside moving vehicles. The federal Transportation Equity Act for the 21st Century of 1999 mandates that, if a state does not prohibit open containers of alcohol inside moving vehicles, then a percentage of its federal highway funds will be transferred instead to alcohol education programs each year. As of December 2011, only one state (Mississippi) allows drivers to consume alcohol while driving (below the 0.08% limit), and only five states (Arkansas, Delaware, Mississippi, Missouri, and West Virginia) allow passengers to consume alcohol while the vehicle is in motion.

Four U.S. states limit alcohol sales in grocery stores and gas stations to beer at or below 3.2% alcohol: Kansas, Minnesota, Oklahoma, and Utah. In these states, stronger beverage sales are restricted to liquor stores. In Oklahoma, liquor stores may not refrigerate any beverage containing more than 3.2% alcohol. Missouri also has provisions for 3.2% beer, but its permissive alcohol laws (when compared to other states) make this type of beer a rarity.

Pennsylvania is starting to allow grocery stores and gas stations to sell alcohol. Wines and spirits are still sold at locations called "state stores", but wine kiosks are starting to be put in at grocery stores. The kiosks are connected to a database in Harrisburg, and purchasers must present valid ID, signature, and look into a camera for facial identification to purchase wine. Only after all of these measures are passed is the individual allowed to obtain one bottle of wine from the "vending machine". The kiosks are only open during the same hours as the state-run liquor stores and are not open on Sundays.

Alcoholic drinks were banned or restricted on U.S. Indian reservations for much of the 19th and twentieth centuries, until federal legislation in 1953 permitted Native Americans to legislate alcohol sales and consumption.

== See also ==
- Alcohol tax
- Alcohol packaging warning messages
- Alcohol exclusion laws
- Alcohol advertising
- Drunk driving law by country
- Health effects of alcohol
- Public intoxication
- Wine law
- Non-alcoholic beverage § Legal definitions
