= Liquor store =

Retail shop that sells alcohol

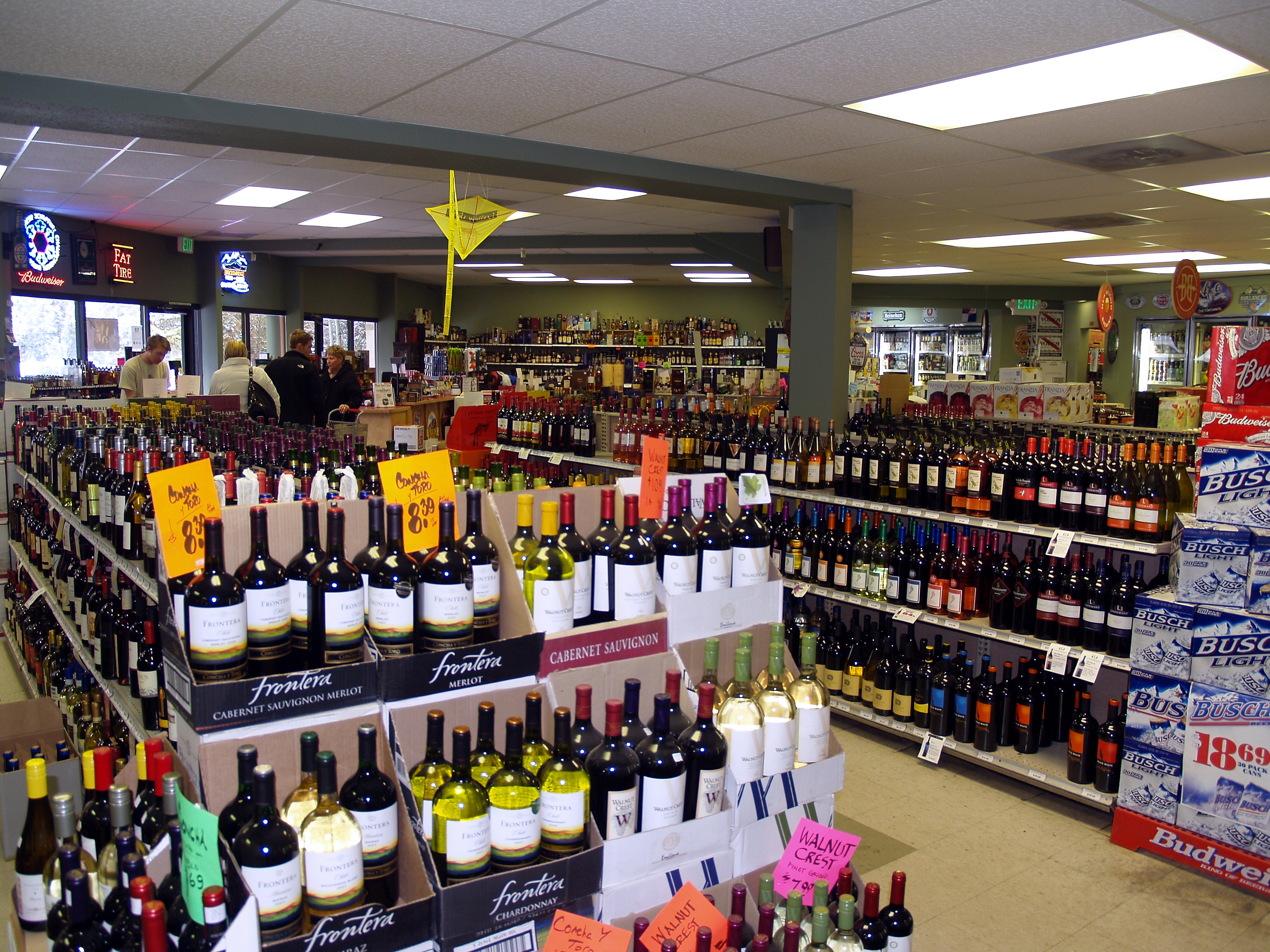
A liquor store in Breckinridge, Colorado, United States (2009)

A liquor store is a retail business that predominantly sells prepackaged alcoholic beverages, including liquors (typically in bottles), wine or beer, usually intended to be consumed off the store's premises. Depending on region and local idiom, they may be called an off-licence (in the UK and Ireland), off-sale (in parts of Canada and the US), bottle shop (in Australia, New Zealand and South Africa), bottle store (South Africa) or, colloquially, bottle-o (in Australia, New Zealand, and parts of Canada), liquor store (in Canada and the US, and less commonly, in Australia and New Zealand), party store (in parts of the US, particularly Michigan) or other similar terms. A very limited number of jurisdictions have an alcohol monopoly. In US states that are alcoholic beverage control (ABC) states, the term ABC store may be used.

== Beer shop ==
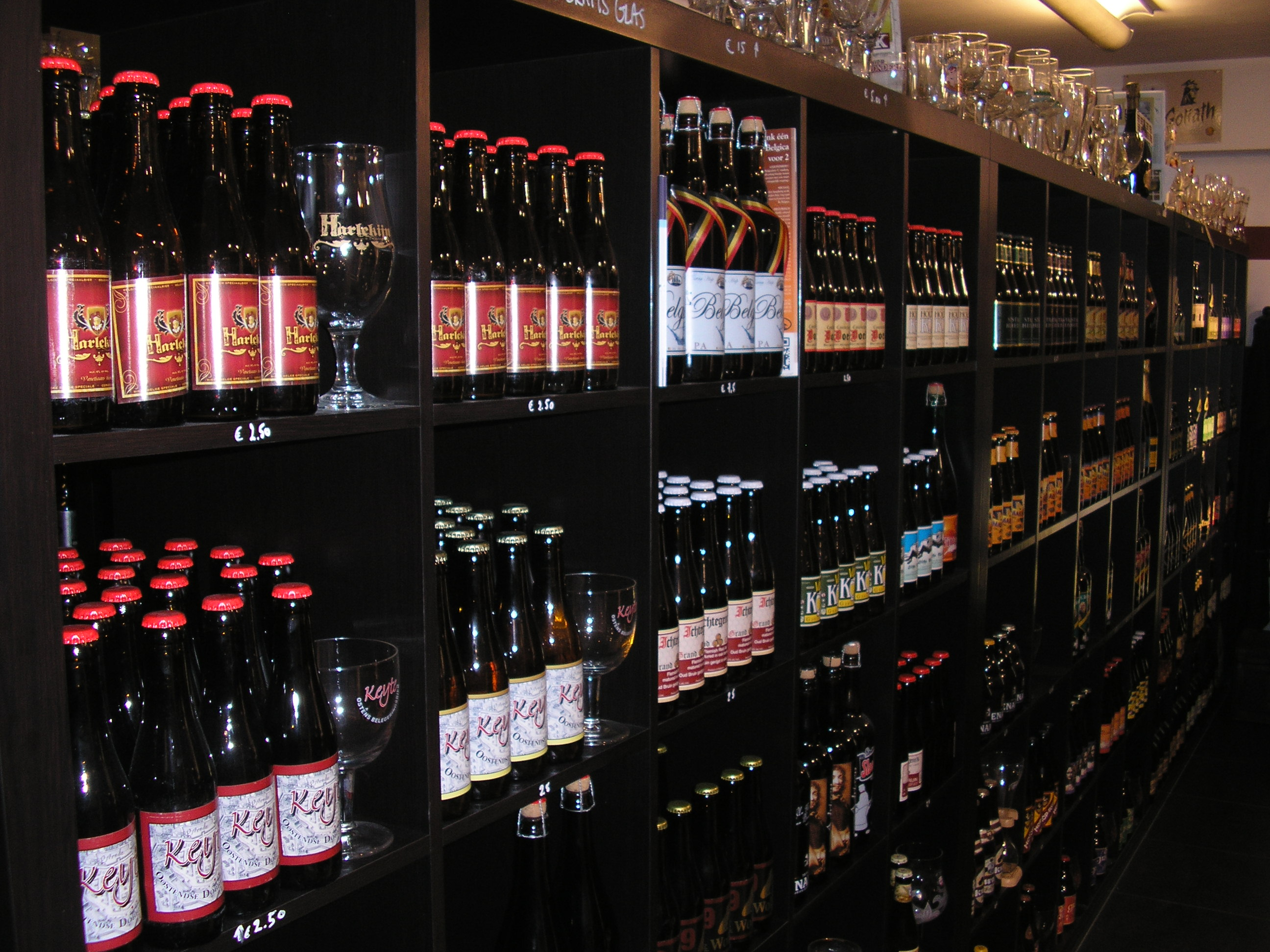
Bottles of beer and glassware at a beer shop

A beer shop (also referred to as a beershop or beer store) is a retail store where beer and other goods related to beer are sold; it is a specialised type of liquor store. Beer shops can be found all around the world, but there are many located in countries where beer is a major cultural product, including Belgium, Canada, Germany, New Zealand, Scandinavian countries, the UK and the US. Beer shops range in size, and may be located along streets or in shopping malls. Some shops offer only regional beer brands which are famous or well known in their region. Others offer a wide range of beer from around the world, and some items may fetch fairly high prices, as with fine wines.

Due to the increase of craft brewing companies, many beer shops sell craft beers from local or international microbreweries, and some such breweries have their own beer shops for selling their own wares and sometimes those of partner breweries, either in regular bottles or in growlers, large, reusable jugs used to transport beer.

Some beer shops also offer beer tastings, homebrewing classes, and speciality goods like beer jam, beer mustard, beer chocolate, craft cheeses, and hop hard liquor. The shops are usually staffed by trained employees, sometimes even beer sommeliers who have a broad knowledge of the topic of beer.

== Asia ==
=== India ===
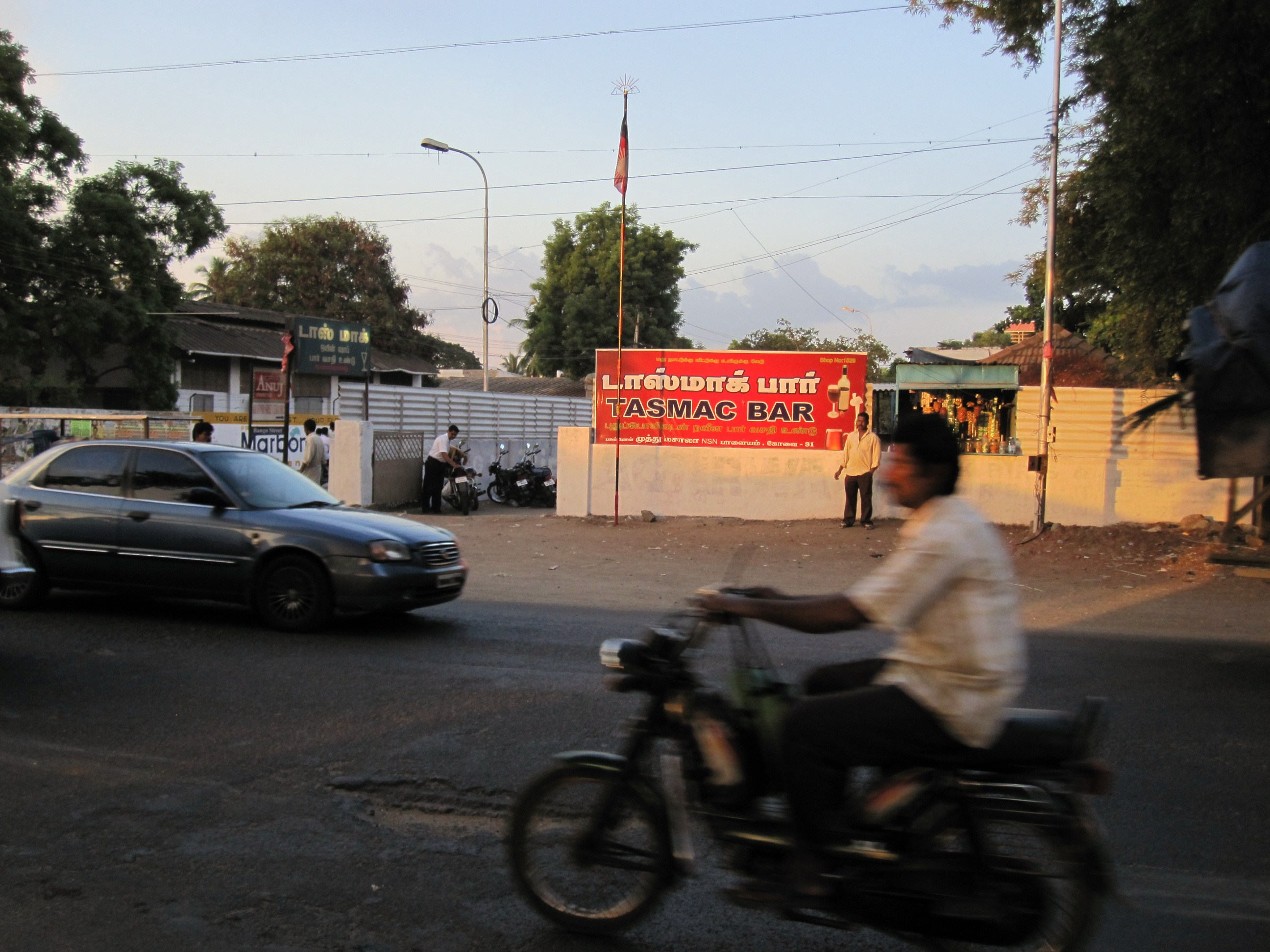
TASMAC Bar in Coimbatore, Tamil Nadu, India

Alcohol laws of India vary greatly from state to state, ranging from total prohibition (e.g. Gujarat) to state monopolies (e.g. Kerala, Tamil Nadu) to commercial licensing (e.g. Delhi, Karnataka).

Licensed alcohol retailers are commonly called liquor shops or wine shops. Despite the name, wine shops primarily sell beer and hard liquor, and may not, in fact, sell wine at all.

In southern India, shops licensed to manufacture and sell only palm wine (toddy) are known as toddy shops, while the shops of Tamil Nadu's alcohol monopoly TASMAC are known as "Tasmac outlets" or "Tasmac bars", and some permit consumption on-premises.

=== Japan ===
Alcohol is widely available in Japan from convenience stores and supermarkets. Dedicated liquor stores are known as sakaya (酒屋), while establishments for drinking on premises are izakaya (居酒屋). Vending machines retailing alcoholic drinks remain common, although a "voluntary ban" was imposed in 2000.

=== South Korea ===
South Korea's old history on alcohol and traditions related to it shows that Korea is widely open to different types of alcohols, which can be easily seen in convenience stores and supermarkets, as well as Korean barbecue houses and hop(beer) houses. There are also stores that specialize in traditional and imported alcohol.

== Europe ==
In Austria, Bulgaria, Croatia, Cyprus, Czech Republic, Estonia, France, Germany, Greece, Hungary, Italy, Latvia, Luxembourg, Malta, Netherlands, Poland, Portugal, Romania, Slovakia, Slovenia and Spain all supermarkets, convenience stores, and petrol stations may sell beer, wine, and liquors only if they possess a licence. The consumption of alcohol on premises is not forbidden, but is frowned upon. In the Netherlands supermarkets are allowed to sell alcoholic beverages up to 15% ABV, hard liquor is only sold from specialized bottle shops.

An EU court sentenced in 2007 that individuals are allowed to order craft beer online within the EU without having to pass through national monopolies.

=== United Kingdom and Ireland ===
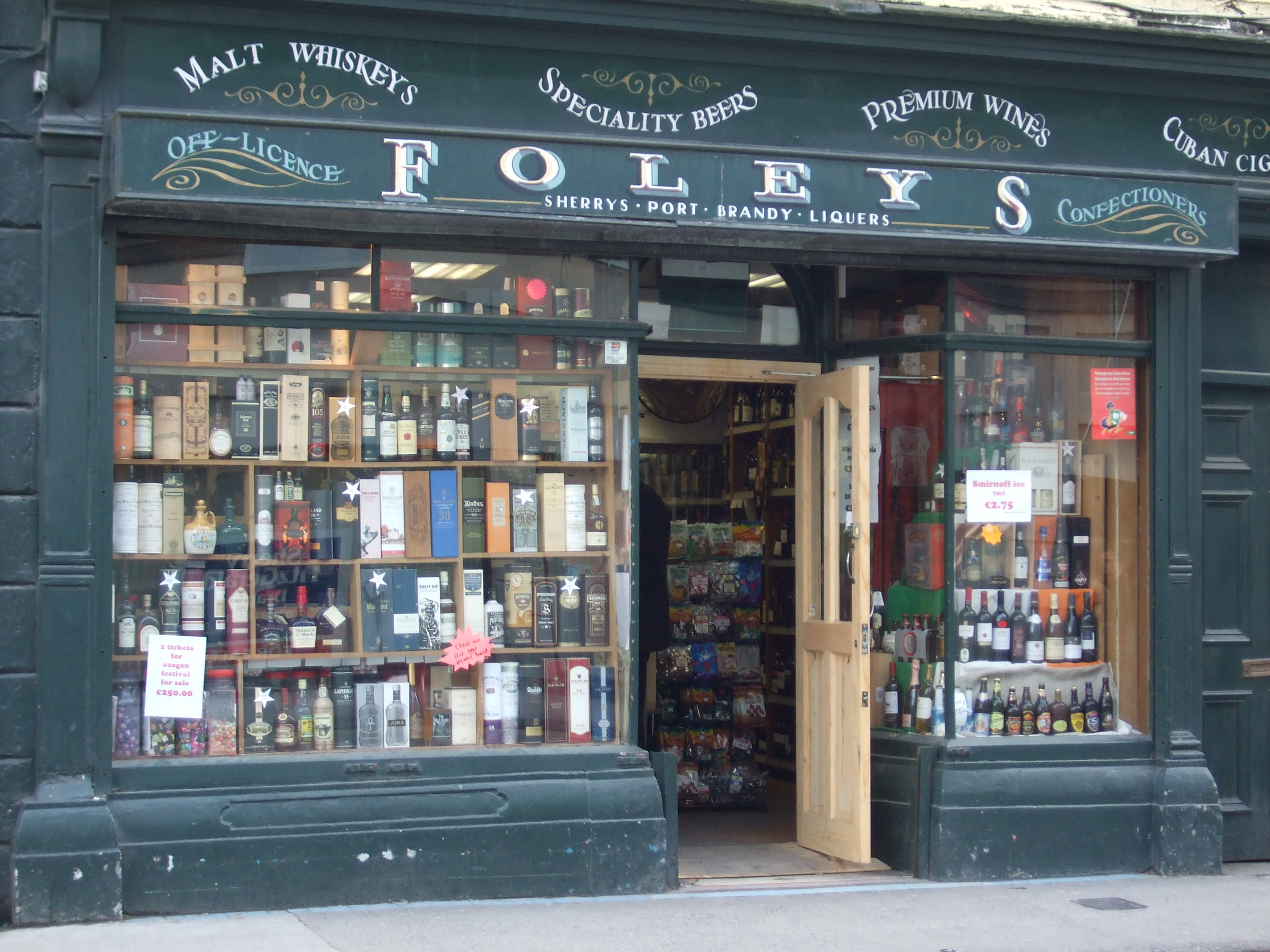
Foley's off-licence, Sligo, Ireland

In the United Kingdom and Ireland the corresponding term is "off-licence". In these countries alcohol licences are either "on-license", referring to an establishment where alcohol may be purchased but must be consumed on the site, such as a pub, bar, nightclub or café; or "off-license", referring to an establishment where alcohol may be purchased but must be consumed off the site. Almost all supermarkets and grocery stores, and many petrol stations, have an off-licence. You must not leave an on-licence with alcohol you purchased there, while you must leave an off-licence before consuming alcohol you purchased there.

In the United Kingdom, the "off-licence" status of a shop could once be used as a device to circumvent restrictive trading laws, particularly those concerning Sunday trading. Depending on local by-laws, shops might be either required to close at noon once a week, or else not be allowed to trade in the evening. Shops with an off-licence made their hours similar to those of public houses, opening during lunch hours and from early evening to the mandatory closing time, usually 22:30 or 23:00. The Sunday Trading Act 1994 exempted liquor store (and any shops that sells alcohol) from its effects. The mandatory closing time for any licensed liquor stores are regulated by Licensing Act 2003 instead.

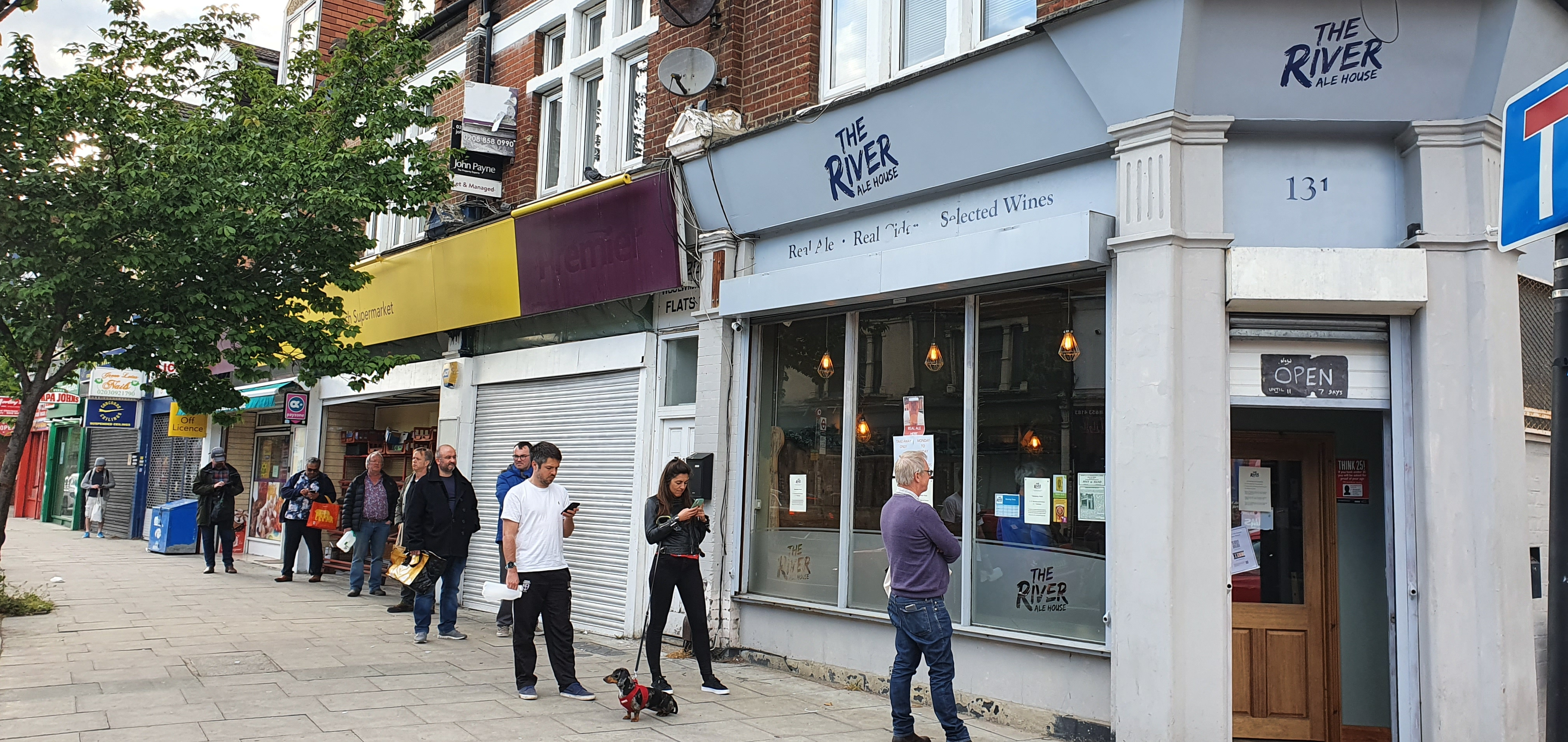
People queuing to buy beer in London on 1 May 2020, during the COVID-19 pandemic

During the COVID-19 pandemic in the United Kingdom, all pubs closed during the lockdown from 20 March 2020. However, on 25 March, off-licences were added to the list of essential businesses allowed to stay open, also enabling pubs and brewery taprooms with licences to sell beer for home consumption to offer takeaway sales and home deliveries.

In the Republic of Ireland, there are five kinds of off-licence:

- Wine Retailer's Off Licence
- Beer Retailer's Off Licence
- Spirit Retailer's Off Licence
- Cider Retailer's Off Licence (not required if Beer Retailer's Off Licence held)
- Sweets Retailer's Off Licence (not required if Wine Retailer's Off Licence held); "sweets" includes products like mead, metheglin and made-wine.

Each licence costs €500 a year and allows shops to only sell certain kinds of alcohol; for example, some newsagents only sell wine, while souvenir shops may only sell "sweets."

=== Nordic countries ===
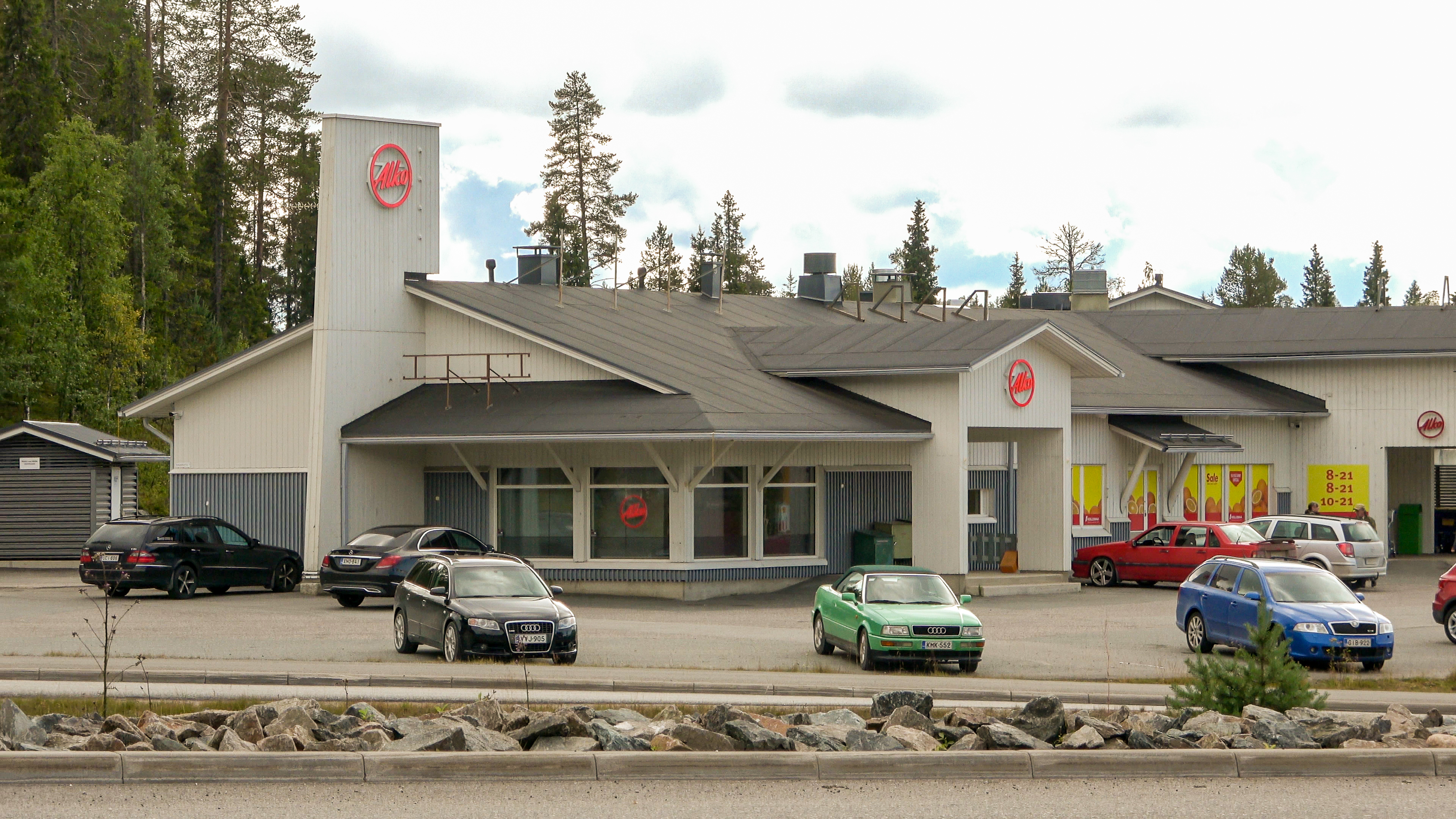
Alko store in Kuusamo, Finland

- Denmark – Alcoholic beverages can be bought at any grocery store or kiosk. There are several dedicated stores specialising in certain types of alcohol, typically wine or beer.
- Faroe Islands – Alcoholic beverages above 1.8% ABV can be bought in Rúsdrekkasøla Landsins, also known as Rúsan
- Finland – Grocery stores and kiosks may sell beer and other mildly alcoholic beverages (no higher than 8% alcohol by volume) during designated hours (9am to 9pm). All other alcohol must be purchased from Alko stores.
- Iceland – Can only be bought at Vínbúð stores.
- Norway – Alcoholic beverages above 4.8% ABV can only be bought at Vinmonopolet stores.
- Sweden – Grocery stores may sell beer no higher than 3.5% ABV. All other alcohol must be purchased in the state-run Systembolaget stores, and it even has some degree of control—also argued to be censorship—over the appearance of the labels.

== North America ==
=== United States ===
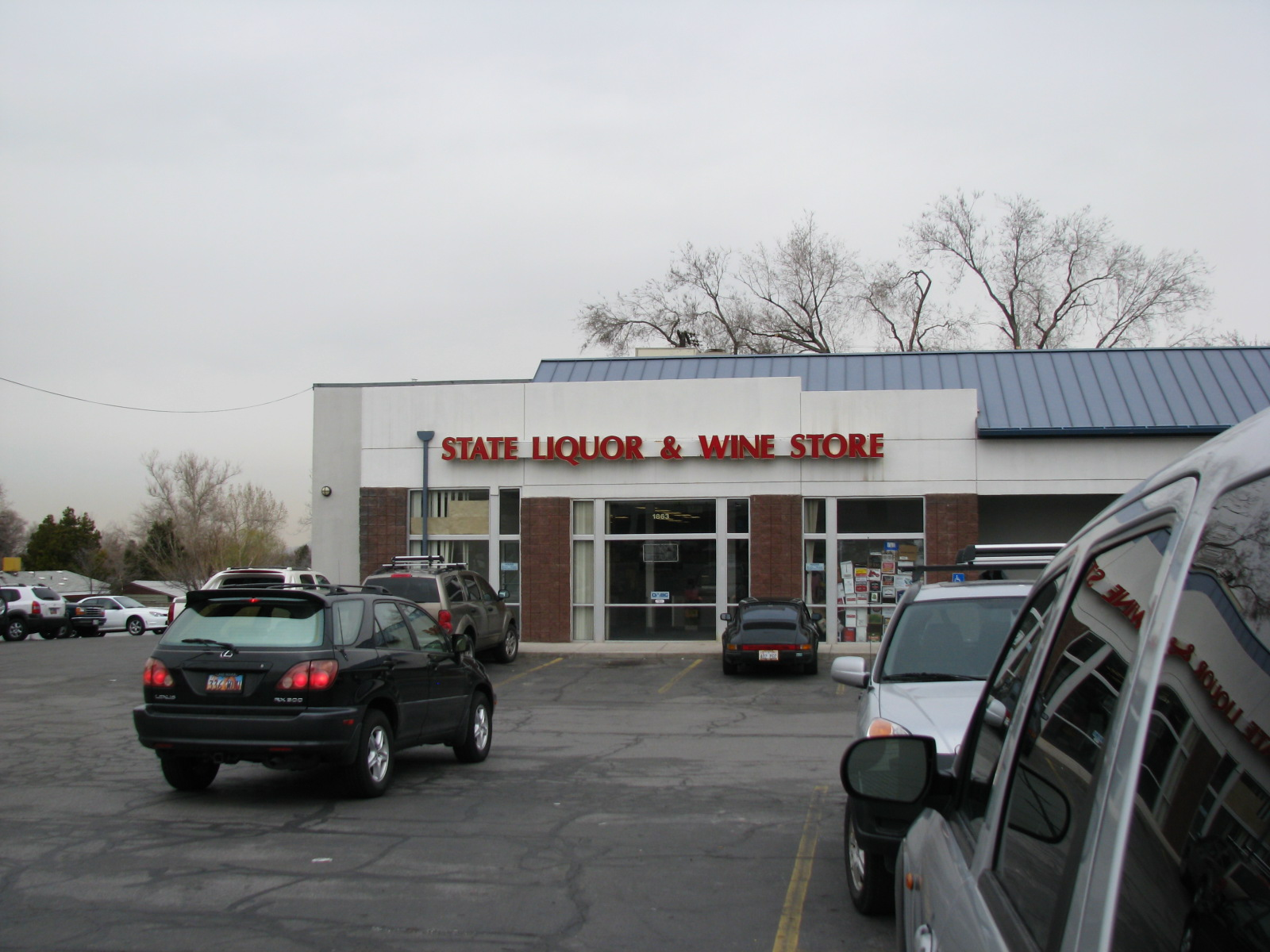
State-run liquor store, Cottonwood Heights, Utah

The Twenty-first Amendment of the United States Constitution allows states to regulate the sale and consumption of alcoholic beverages. State regulations vary widely. The majority of the U.S. states have laws specifying which alcoholic beverages must be sold in specialty liquor stores and which may be sold in other venues.

In seventeen alcoholic beverage control (ABC) states, the specialty liquor stores are owned and operated exclusively by the state government, where liquor stores often sell only spirits or sometimes sell spirits and wine but not beer. ABC-run stores may be called ABC stores or state stores.

In Alabama, Connecticut, Georgia, Louisiana, Massachusetts, Rhode Island, and Texas, liquor stores are also known as package stores; locally in Connecticut, Massachusetts, and areas bordering these states the term pack or packie is used as well, because purchased liquor must be packaged in sealed bottles or other containers when it is taken from the store.

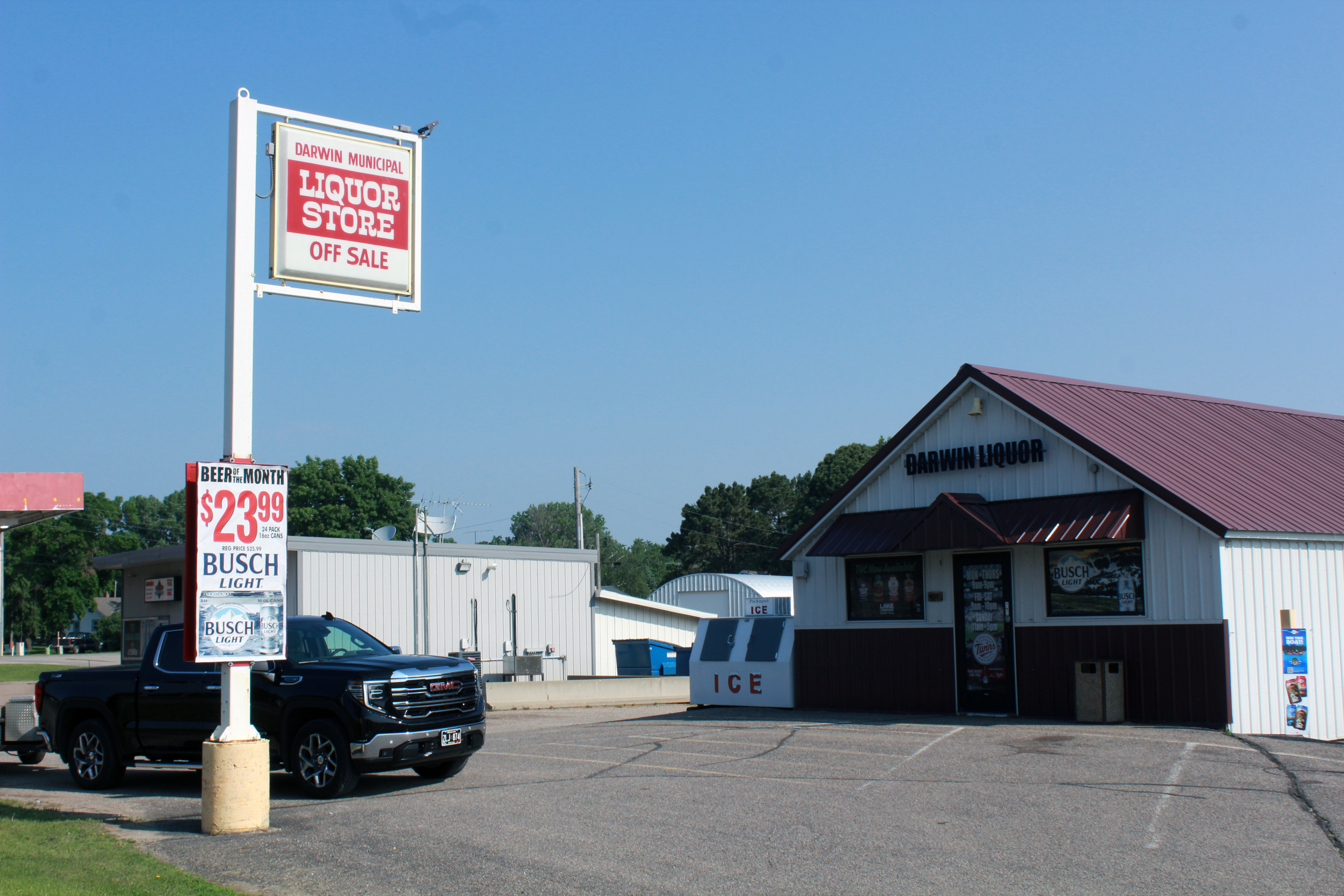
Municipal Liquor Store, Darwin, Minnesota

In two states (Minnesota, and Utah), only low-point beer may be sold in supermarkets or gas stations. In Utah, stores not owned and operated by the state are known as Package Agencies. These are liquor outlets operated by private individuals or corporate entities under contract with the state for the purpose of selling packaged liquor, wine and beer to the general public for off-premise consumption. Package Agencies are located in communities too small to warrant the establishment of a state store, and in resorts and hotels where the outlets exist primarily for the benefit of their guests. In Minnesota there are both private liquor stores or city-owned municipal liquor stores. They are sometimes known as "Off Sales", meaning purchase for off-premises consumption, similar to "Off-licence" in the UK. A bar or tavern is an "On Sale" where liquor is consumed on-premises. Municipal liquor stores are sometimes called "Munis."

Bar in Missouri licensed to sell "by package"

In some states (e.g., California, Louisiana, Missouri, Nevada, New Mexico, and Wisconsin), all alcoholic beverages can be sold practically anywhere, including drug stores and gas stations.

In Washington state, all beer and wine are available in specialty stores, grocery stores, convenience stores, department stores, taverns, and other locations. All spirits are available in stores greater than 10,000 square feet (930 m^{2}; such as grocery stores, big box liquor chains, and drug stores). There are two exceptions to the 10,000-square-foot (930 m^{2}) rule: 1) former state and contract liquor stores that reopened under private ownership may also sell spirits provided they have been issued a new license from the state; and 2) cities, mostly in rural areas, that do not have a store that meets the minimum floor space may be allowed to sell spirits if the Liquor Control Board deems that there are no sufficient establishments within the trade area.

Robert's on Manchester Avenue in Westchester, California (2026)

In parts of California, most notably Los Angeles, the term "liquor store" can often apply to any convenience store, corner store, minimart, or similar small local neighborhood grocery store.

In 2012, Drizly, an alcohol e-commerce platform, launched its service in Boston allowing liquor stores to offer on-demand delivery. Other alcohol e-commerce platforms include Minibar, Saucey, and Bevz. In 2020, during the COVID-19 pandemic, Instacart announced that users would be able to add alcohol to their pick-up orders.

=== Canada ===
All provinces except Alberta have government-owned retail liquor retailers, with varying levels of quasi-monopoly status. Alberta has only privately owned liquor stores. Elsewhere in the country, there is a mix of public and privately owned retail outlets. Etymology varies across Canada; regional terms used in addition to "liquor store" include "off-sale" in the Prairie Provinces.

Due to federal law, all provincial liquor boards must act as the first importer of alcoholic beverages.

- Alberta – Only liquor stores may sell alcoholic beverages in urban areas, but unlike other provinces they are all privately owned and operated. Recently the province has allowed supermarkets to open attached liquor stores, but with separate entrances. Urban gasoline (petrol) stations and convenience stores may also have attached liquor stores but with separate entrances and ownership. In areas without another liquor retailer within a 15 km radius, any licensed retailer may sell beer, wine, and liquor, including convenience stores, general stores, and gasoline (petrol) stations. The AGLC has retained its monopoly over the wholesaling of imported beer, wine and distilled spirits, although the distribution of these products is done by a private contractor.
- British Columbia – Alcoholic beverages may be sold only:
  - in privately owned retail stores (stores may be operated only by primary liquor license holders, such as bars, pubs and hotels, but the stores can be located off site)
  - in government-owned BC Liquor Stores,
  - in rural government-appointed liquor agencies (which may be a gas station or convenience store).
  - There are also VQA (Vintners Quality Alliance) wine stores, which are privately owned. They sell only British Columbia wines that have the VQA designation, at the same price as in the government liquor stores. There are also a limited number of private wine shops, which may sell both British Columbia and non-British Columbia wines.
  - In 2012, British Columbia announced it planned to fully privatise liquor wholesale distribution by 2015. In September 2012, the initiative to privatize liquor wholesale distribution was cancelled, a term agreed upon during contract negotiations with the BCGEU.
- Manitoba – Only hotels may sell chilled domestic beer. Beer, wine, and liquor may be sold only by government-owned Liquor Marts. There are also a limited number of private wine retailers in Manitoba as well.
- New Brunswick – Only government-owned New Brunswick Liquor Corporation stores or rural government appointed liquor agencies may sell beer, wine, and liquor. Pandemic-era reforms have allowed pubs and restaurants to sell alcohol to takeaway. However, breweries and cottage wineries may sell directly to the public if they are licensed to do so.
- Newfoundland and Labrador – Convenience stores may sell beer that is brewed locally. Wine, liquor, and imported beer is sold by only by government-owned Newfoundland and Labrador Liquor Corporation stores or rural government-appointed liquor agencies.
- Nova Scotia – In the past, only the provincially owned Nova Scotia Liquor Corporation (NSLC) could sell liquor products, including hard liquor, wine, and beer. Many NSLC locations are connected to grocery stores. Over the past five years, the NSLC began to allow a limited number of small private agency stores to operate in rural areas with no NSLC location.
- Ontario – Most establishments with an on-premise licence (pubs, restaurants, etc.) are permitted to sell alcohol to takeaway in any closed container. Many of these licensed establishments have converted their operations to ‘bottle shops’ selling primarily wine to go. Prior to the implementation of these rules, Ontario maintained a quasi-monopoly consisting of public and privately owned retailers as well as supermarkets.
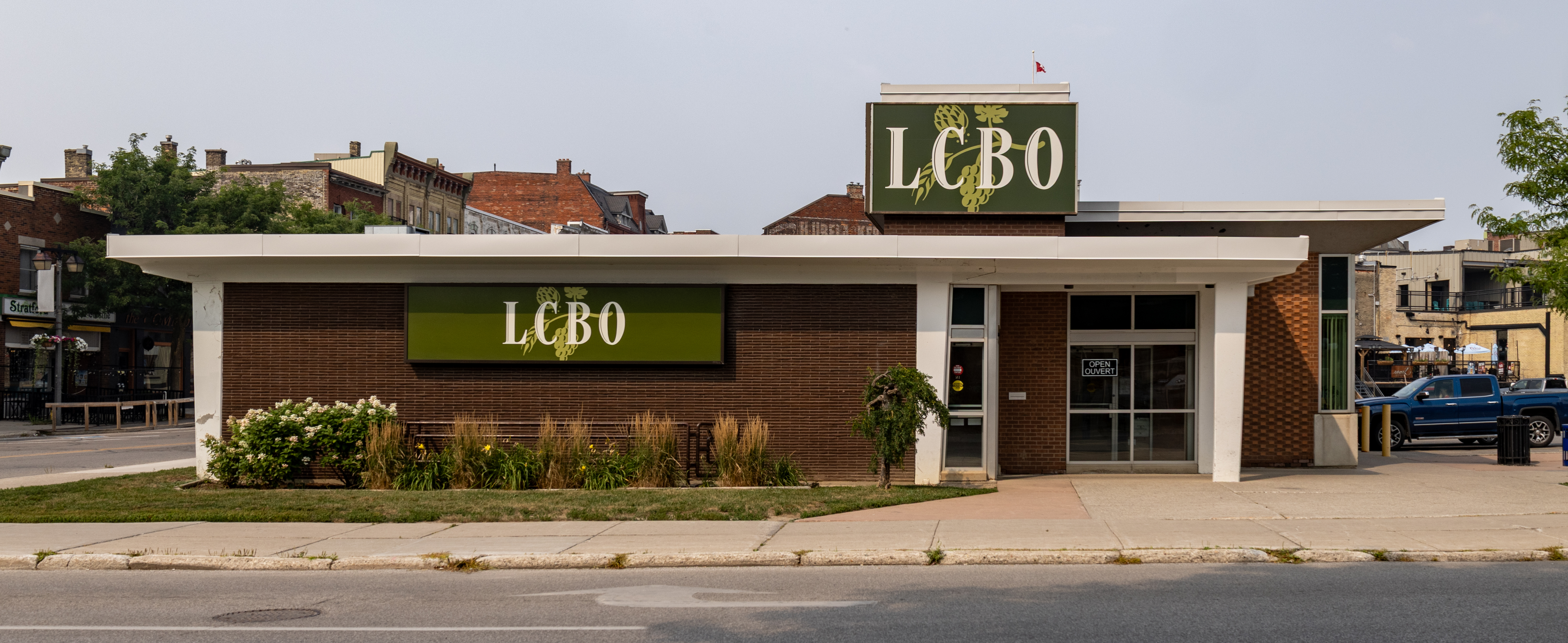
  LCBO store, Stratford, Ontario
  - Beer: Brewers Retail Inc. (operating as The Beer Store) was originally owned by a co-operative of Ontario brewers but is now owned by multinational brewers, mostly based outside Canada, is the only privately owned entity that can sell beer in large packs. Only the provincially owned Liquor Control Board of Ontario (LCBO) may sell spirits or wine, but it also sells beer, particularly in small markets that Brewers Retail does not serve.
  - Wine: There are also a limited number of privately owned specialty wine stores: Wine Rack, run by Vincor International and The Wine Shop (formerly Vineyards Estate Wines), run by Andres Wines. The province allows Ontario wineries to maintain a fixed number of off-site retail locations under a clause that was grandfathered into legislation when the Canada-US Free Trade Agreement came into effect in 1989, and it was further allowed by WTO regulations implemented in 1995. Ontario is the only province in which a winery is may form a partnership with a department store to operate such retail locations.
- Prince Edward Island – Only government-owned Prince Edward Island Liquor Control Commission stores may sell beer, wine, and liquor.
- Québec – Only the provincially owned Société des alcools du Québec (SAQ) may sell spirits. Wine (that is bottled in Québec or distributed through a Québec representative) and beer (that is brewed in Québec or imported beer that is distributed by a local brewer) may be purchased at dépanneurs (corner stores) and supermarkets, as well as specialist wine boutiques.
- Saskatchewan – Until the 2010s, only hotels, government-owned stores, and rural private/government liquor stores (i.e., private contractors) were allowed to sell beer, wine, and liquor. However, since then, the provincial Saskatchewan Liquor Board has licensed private stores in urban areas.

== Oceania ==
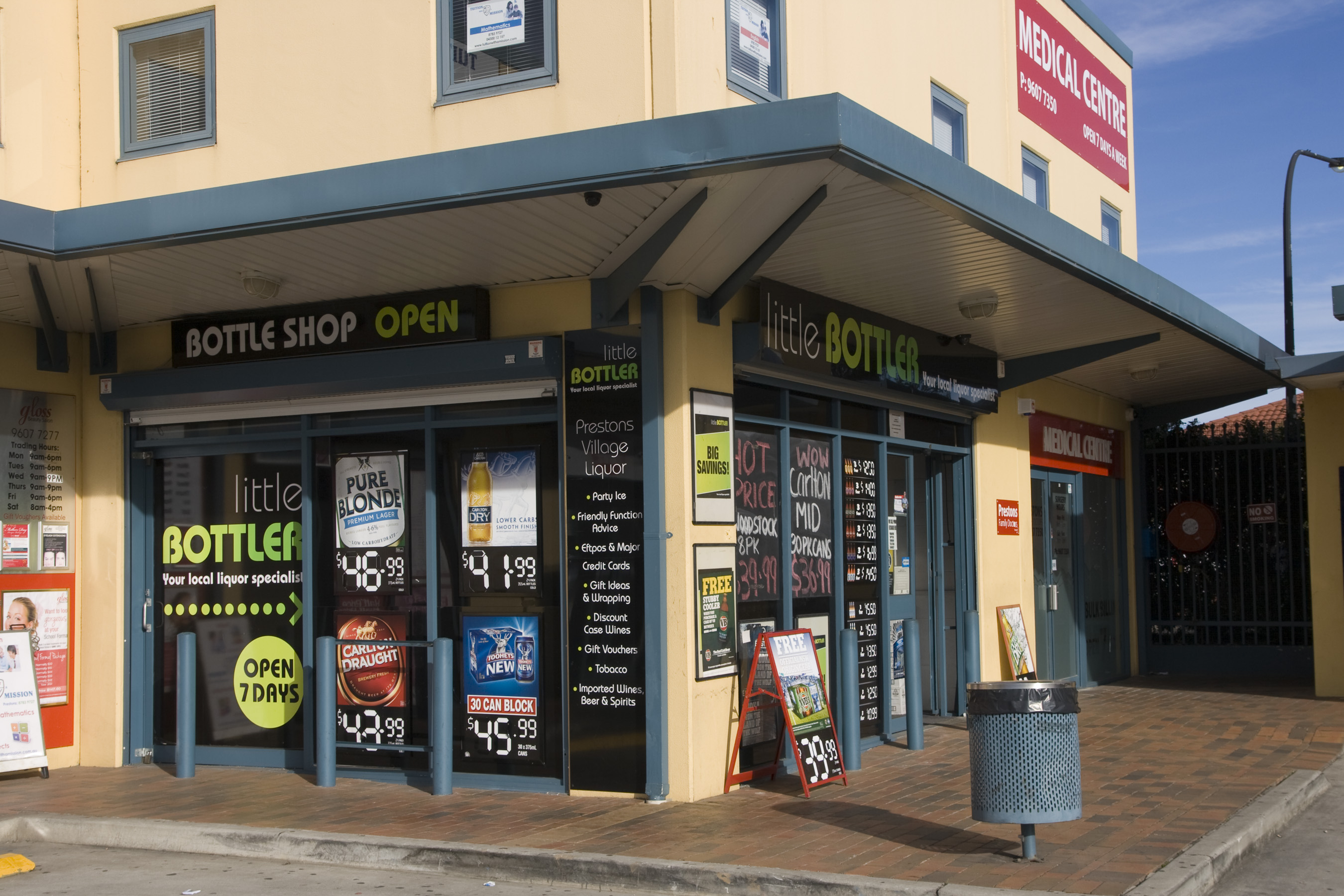
A bottle shop in Prestons, New South Wales

- Australia – Regulation of alcoholic beverage sales is a state responsibility. Generally, beer, wine and spirits must be purchased at a bottle shop, colloquially known as a bottle-o (pronounced /ˈbɒtloʊ/ BOT-loh). The term 'liquor store' is also in use. These may be a separate section of a supermarket or an individual shop – major retail corporations usually have their own bottle shop franchises located close to their supermarket operations. Drinking establishments may also sell liquor for off-site consumption. Drive-through alcoholic retail outlets are common. The state of Victoria and the Australian Capital Territory permit the sale of alcoholic beverages from supermarkets and convenience stores.
- New Zealand – An off-licence is granted initially for one year and then subsequently renewed every three years. Supermarkets may sell beer, cider and wine with no more than 15% ABV only. Spirits (whisky, brandy, rum, gin, vodka, etc.), including ready to drink (RTD) mixed spirits, must be purchased at separate bottle shops. Most convenience stores, called dairies, are not licensed to sell alcohol. Off-licence is also used for beverage outlets inside sporting venues, whereby alcoholic beverages are bought "outside" the point-of-sale, even if it was inside a food outlet, because it can be consumed at the stands, but is still consumed within the vicinity of the venue itself, and cannot be taken out of the venue.

== See also ==
- Enoteca, a type of speciality wine shop
- Convenience store
