= Hilde Britt Mellbye =

Norwegian businessperson (born 1961)

Hilde Britt Skarbøvik Mellbye (born 14 April 1961) is a Norwegian businessperson. Having acted as the CEO of Norlandia Care since February 2010, Mellbye was appointed as CEO of the Norwegian government-owned wine and spirits retail monopoly company, AS Vinmonopolet after the death of Kai G. Henriksen, to assume the position on 1 January 2017.

Business positions
Preceded by Lars Sogn (acting)	CEO of Vinmonopolet; 2017–	Succeeded by incumbent
