= Kai G. Henriksen =

Norwegian politician

deputy member of the Parliament of Norway
- In office 1985–1989)

Personal details
- Party: Conservative Party of Norway
- Occupation: businessman

Kai Henning Gjesdal Henriksen (21 May 1956 – 27 May 2016) was a Norwegian businessman. A former politician for the Conservative Party of Norway, and having served a period as the chief executive officer of Storebrand Bank, Henriksen was CEO of the Norwegian government-owned wine and spirits retail monopoly company, AS Vinmonopolet from 2006 until his death in 2016.

== Early career ==
Henriksen served his mandatory military service from 1975 to 1976 in the Royal Norwegian Navy. Henriksen holds a cand.polit. degree from the University of Oslo which he attended from 1978 to 1984, a period during which he also worked as a journalist for regional newspaper Østlandets Blad. While studying French in Tours during the early 1980s, Henriksen has stated he first discovered wine while there.

From 1984 to 1986, Henriksen was the leader of the Young Conservatives (Unge Høyre), the youth wing of the Conservative Party. In 1986 Henriksen worked for the Ministry of Foreign Affairs as a private secretary (now called political adviser) for then foreign minister Svenn Stray, during Willoch's Second Cabinet. Henriksen served as a deputy representative to the Parliament of Norway from Akershus during the term 1985–1989. Then from 1986 to 1988 he was political advisor to the chairman of the Conservative Party, Rolf Presthus, and a similar capacity during 1989–1990 under then Minister of Trade Kaci Kullmann Five during the cabinet Syse.

== Business career ==
Henriksen achieved his Master of Business Administration from Harvard Business School which he attended from 1990 to 1992. Henriksen served as a "summer trainee" in 1991 at Procter & Gamble in Stockholm, and held the position of project leader at McKinsey & Company from 1992 to 1995, working with projects involving strategies and business development. From 1995, Henriksen was market director at Avanse Forvaltning AS until 1997. In 1997 Henriksen became the CEO of Storebrand Bank, which he remained until 2003. From 2003 to 2006, Henriksen was CEO of the attorney firm DLA Nordic DA.

=== Vinmonopolet ===
Following the scandal that was uncovered in 2005 involving Vinmonopolet employees and the importer firm Ekjord A/S that brought about the resignation of then Vinmonopolet CEO Knut Grøholt in the episode named the "Ekjord Case", Henriksen was appointed as successor to the position which he began in August 2006.

In this capacity, Henriksen stressed his commitment to the 'social responsibility' of preventing access to alcohol among minors, and fulfilling the mandate to run an operation so successful that the monopoly arrangement will remain in the future, having stated, "We will earn the support of the people". Henriksen has implored that other leaders in Vinmonopolet ought to leave their desks, put on uniforms and experience "work on the floor", which he does himself at least three times a year. Having initiated several reforms relating to the employees' conditions and competency investment, some at great financial cost, many maintain the opinion that he is the best director of the company they have experienced.

From a customer perspective, the period under Henriksen's leadership and its changes have widely been received positively, with several voices previously critical of the Vinmonopolet institution in recent years declaring that it may be becoming the "world's leading wine store". In contrast, Tom Marthinsen of Dagens Næringsliv though acknowledging progress from the conditions of the 90s, is critical of techniques Henriksen and his team have introduced from chain stores and standardization methods. Arne Ronold MW stated in 2008, "they have become aware of the problems and are taking measures", and, "I may have been one of the most ardent critics, but I have mildened somewhat".

In August 2010, Henriksen passed the Wine & Spirit Education Trust advanced diploma with the distinction "with merit", becoming the first managing director of Vinmonopolet to obtain a wine trade education.

== Final years and death ==
Henriksen was diagnosed with cancer in November 2014, and withdrew from his position in March 2016. He was reported to have died on 27 May 2016 at his home in Oslo.

Party political offices
Preceded by Sveinung Lunde	Leader of Norwegian Young Conservatives; 1984–1986	Succeeded by Trond Helleland
