= List of countries with alcohol prohibition =

The following countries or territories have or had comprehensive prohibitions against alcohol. Particularly the term refers to the banning of the manufacture, storage (whether in barrels or in bottles), transportation, sale, possession, and consumption of alcoholic beverages.

== Present ==
Currently, alcohol prohibition is enforced in many Muslim majority countries, in parts of India, and in some Indigenous American and Indigenous Australian communities and certain northern communities in the Canadian territories. They can range from bans on sales during certain times to complete bans.

- Afghanistan
- Algeria (illegal in public, legal in restaurants, bars, hotels and homes)
- Bangladesh (license required; illegal during Ramadan)
- Brunei (Non-Muslims over 17 years of age may have a limited amount of alcohol, but must declare it to the customs authorities on arrival, and must consume it in private)
- Canada
  - Yukon (in some communities)
  - Northwest Territories (in some communities)
  - Nunavut (in some communities)
  - Quebec (in some communities)
- China (banned for public servants in regions with Muslim-majority population within Gansu, Ningxia and Xinjiang)
- Comoros (for Muslims during Ramadan)
- Djibouti
- Egypt (illegal to drink in public places and during Ramadan)
- India
  - Gujarat
  - Bihar
  - Nagaland
  - Mizoram
- Indonesia
  - Aceh province (public consumption illegal, allowance in certain cases for Non-Muslims and foreign tourists that drink in private)
- Iran (home production legal for Zoroastrians, Jews and Christians; commercial production illegal)
- Iraq (parliamentary ban, rarely enforced)
- Japan
  - Tokyo (public drinking and alcohol sales banned in Shibuya Ward between 5 p.m. and 6 a.m. during all periods)
- Kuwait (forbidden even for non-Muslims and tourists, except foreign diplomats)
- Libya
- Malaysia (excluding non-Muslims; some states ban drinking in public)
  - Kelantan
  - Terengganu
- Maldives (legal for foreigners at licensed establishments; transport of alcohol illegal)
- Mauritania
- Morocco (illegal in public, legal in restaurants, bars, hotels and homes)
- Oman (legal for non-Muslim foreigners at restaurants, hotels and bars; at home with license; illegal in public)
- Pakistan (legal for non-Muslims and foreigners, served at hotels and can be bought at wine stores; illegal for Muslims; public consumption illegal)
- Palestine (illegal in the Gaza Strip under sharia law, but legal in the West Bank)
- Qatar (legal for tourists at hotels and bars as well as expatriates with permits)
- Russia
  - Chechnya (illegal for Muslims)
- Saudi Arabia (complete ban enforced from 1952 to 2024, now accessible to foreign non-Muslim diplomats as well as select non-Muslim residents making over 50,000 riyals a month or holding premium residency)
- Somalia
- Sudan (excluding non-Muslims in private)
- Syria (sales partially restricted for Muslims since 2024; exceptions apply for non-Muslim population such as Christians)
- Tunisia (sales only banned on Fridays and during Ramadan)
- Turkmenistan (illegal on trains, airplanes, and ferries as well as sports facilities; sales banned on weekends and holidays unless at bars and restaurants)
- Ukraine (since the beginning of Russia's invasion of the country in 2022 and subsequent martial law, sales illegal in certain parts of the country; legal in some areas controlled by Russia)
- United Arab Emirates (illegal for Muslims, illegal in Sharjah; public consumption illegal)
- United Kingdom
  - Bournville (The sale of alcohol is not permitted in the Bournville area of Birmingham and thus no licensed premisies exist in the village).
- United States (dry counties for sales)
- Yemen (illegal; before the war, there were exceptions for tourists at certain hotels in Aden and Sana'a)

== Past ==
- Canada – 1918–1920 (see prohibition in Canada)
- Faroe Islands – 1907–1992 (see 1907 Faroese alcohol referendum)
- Finland – 1919–1932 – sales of beer prohibited in certain municipalities until 1995.
- Hungarian Soviet Republic – 21 March – 1 August 1919 – Sale and consumption of alcohol was prohibited (partial ban from 23 July).
- Iceland – 1915–1935 (see prohibition in Iceland) – However beer with an alcohol content exceeding 2.25% was prohibited until 1989.
- North Yemen – 1962–1990
- Norway – 1916–1926, distilled spirits banned; 1917-1923 fortified wines banned.
- Ottoman Empire – 1612–1640 (prohibition by Murad IV)
- Panama – 25 March – 8 May 2020 – Sale and consumption of alcohol was prohibited as part of the social distancing measures against Covid-19.
- Philippines – 1966–1986
- Pitcairn Islands – 1790-2009
- Russian Empire and the Soviet Union – 19 July 1914 – 28 August 1925; 1929;
- South Africa (temporary ban to prevent drunken violence during the COVID-19 pandemic in South Africa) (Note: In 2020, South Africa reimposed a ban on alcohol sales in July after an initial ban ended on 1 June. In August, South Africa lifted its second ban on alcohol.)
- United Arab Emirates – In November 2020, the UAE introduced reforms that include the decriminalisation of alcohol for those 21 and over, except the Emirate of Sharjah.
- United States – 1920–1933 (see prohibition in the United States)

== See also ==
- Religion and alcohol
