= Alcohol exclusion laws =

Laws permitting insurance companies to deny alcohol-related claims

Alcohol exclusion laws permit insurance companies to deny claims associated with the consumption of alcohol. They were passed in the 1940s in the United States to discourage people from drinking alcoholic beverages and to save insurance companies money from alcohol-related claims. It was believed that people would be less likely to drive while impaired or intoxicated if insurance companies could deny medical payments or other claims associated with any injuries associated with the consumption of alcoholic beverages. Thirty-six states currently allow alcohol exclusions in health care insurance policies via either explicit exclusions or implicit exclusions determined by legal precedence. A growing number of states are overturning their alcohol exclusion laws, currently 14 states plus the District of Columbia prohibit insurance companies from including exclusions for alcohol intoxication.

There is to date no scientific evidence that alcohol exclusion laws discourage drunk driving. In fact, some argue that these laws discourage physicians and hospitals from testing crash victims for possible alcohol in their blood (BAC). That's because insurance companies can refuse to pay doctors and hospitals for treating patients found to have alcohol in their bodies. In short, screening for alcohol could lead to the loss of payments from insurance companies. Because of this, there is concern that alcohol exclusion laws help drunken drivers avoid detection and increase the likelihood that they will repeat their crime in the future. Nine states now prohibit alcohol exclusions and several more are currently considering such action.

The insurance industry supports alcohol exclusion laws. On the other hand, the professional organization which regulates that industry, the National Association of Insurance Commissioners, has voted unanimously to recommend the repeal of alcohol exclusionary laws. Other groups supporting their repeal include the National Conference of Insurance Legislators, the American Bar Association, the American College of Emergency Physicians, Mothers Against Drunk Driving, the National Commission Against Drunk Driving, and the American Medical Association.

== See also ==
- Alcohol law
