= Brit Denstad =

Norwegian civil servant

Brit Denstad (born 24 December 1935) is a Norwegian civil servant.

She is a sociologist and took the Dr. Philos degree in 1975. She worked as a sub-director in the Norwegian Ministry of Social Affairs from 1977 to 1981 before working many years as a research director. She was the director of Institutt for anvendt sosialvitenskapelig forskning (INAS) from 1981 to 1987 and Norges råd for anvendt samfunnsforskning (NORAS) from 1987 to 1992. She was then a sub-director in the Research Council of Norway from 1993 to 1994 and director of research and development at Oslo University College from 1994 to 1995. On 1 February 1996 she succeeded Knut Grøholt as the permanent under-secretary of state in the Ministry of Government Administration. She continued until 2001, and then became a special adviser in the same ministry (now named the Ministry of Government Administration and Labour).

Civic offices
Preceded by Knut Grøholt	Permanent under-secretary of state in the Ministry of Government Administration and Labour; 1996–2001	Succeeded by Karin Moe Røisland
