= Arne Ronold =

Arne Ronold is a Norwegian Master of Wine, a journalist and editor of the Norwegian wine publication Vinforum, and considered an expert on Italian and Burgundy wine.

== Career ==
Ronold was from 1993 until 2008 the only MW of Norway, and was the first in Scandinavia to attain the accreditation.

Prior to his career in wine he has a background in the research of theoretical physics, nuclear physics and mathematical flow models, with a degree in engineering from the Norwegian University of Science and Technology.

A co-author of several books, including Verdt å vite om vin and Italiensk Vin, he annually publishes the pocket-sized consumer guides Norges beste vinkjøp.

=== Vinforum ===
In 1986 Ronold and Ola Dybvik founded the publication Vinforum. The magazine is annually published by Pedicel AS in five issues, in addition to six subscriber newsletters that are distributed digitally or as paper edition. Typically ca. 70 pages long, the magazine includes features, wine reviews and a column by Jancis Robinson MW translated into Norwegian.

The motivation behind founding the magazine was, according to a statement in a 2010 Vinforum editorial by Dybvik, because the Norwegian alcohol monopoly chain store Vinmonopolet "failed in its responsibility to its customers by practicing an arrogance with the inherent insolence of dictating the tastes of the Norwegian people. And worst of all, they managed to convince the Norwegian people they were doing a good job." At the time Vinmonopolet had an Italian wine selection which totalled 14 labels (including reds, whites and sparkling). This situation has since improved significantly over two decades, with Dybvik declaring in 2010, "we are living in paradise".

In 2003 Ronold and Vinforum challenged the Norwegian ban on all advertisement of alcoholic drink, after the equivalent ban in Sweden had become overturned following actions by the magazine Gourmet and it had been demonstrated to oppose EU free trade rules. In June 2009 Norwegian supreme court ruled against Ronold and Vinforum, leaving the Norwegian alcoholic advertisement ban intact.

In 2012, Ola Dybvig sold his 50% shares of Vinforum publisher Pedicel AS to the publishing house Forlagshuset Vigmostad og Bjørke, a previous publication collaborator, with Arno Vigmostad and Arnstein Bjørke as replacement partners to Arne Ronold.

== See also ==
- List of wine personalities
