= Knut Grøholt =

Norwegian civil servant (born 1942)

Knut Grøholt (born 18 June 1942) is a Norwegian civil servant.

== Biography ==
He was born on 18 June 1942, in Oslo, was educated with the siv.øk. degree and later took the Ph.D. degree. He was hired in the Norwegian Ministry of Local Government and Labour in 1973, and was promoted to deputy under-secretary of state in 1985. From 1990 to 1996, he was the permanent under-secretary of state in the Ministry of Government Administration and Labour, and in 1996 he was appointed as CEO of Vinmonopolet.

In 1992, he applied unsuccessfully for the position as director of the Research Council of Norway.

He has been the chair of Arbeidsgiverforeningen NAVO and of the Norwegian Institute for Cultural Heritage Research.

Civic offices
Preceded by position created	Permanent under-secretary of state in the Ministry of Government Administration; 1990–1996	Succeeded by Brit Denstad
