= 1973 Faroese alcohol referendum =

8 November 1973
- State monopoly on alcohol beverages

Results
Choice	Votes	%
Yes	5,683	38.48%
No	9,086	61.52%
Valid votes	14,769	99.35%
Invalid or blank votes	97	0.65%
Total votes	14,866	100.00%
Registered voters/turnout	24,103	61.68%

A referendum on creating a state monopoly on alcoholic beverages was held in the Faroe Islands on 8 November 1973. The proposal was rejected by 62% of voters, equating to 37.7% of registered voters, above the 33% quorum required for rejection. Prohibition was eventually lifted in 1992.

== Background ==
In 1907 the Løgting voted to hold a consultative referendum on banning alcoholic drinks. The result was a strong "yes" vote, with over 95% of voters voting for prohibition. As a result, a ban on the serving and trade in beverages with an alcoholic content above 2% was introduced the following year.

== Results ==
Choice	Votes	%
For	5,683	38.48
Against	9,086	61.52
Invalid/blank votes	97	–
Total	14,866	100
Registered voters/turnout	24,103	61.68
Source: Direct Democracy
