= Saucey =

American on-demand alcohol delivery service

- Type: Private
- Industry: E-commerce; Retail; Alcoholic beverage
- Founded: 2013 in Los Angeles, California, United States
- Founders: Chris Vaughn; Daniel Leeb; Andrew Zeck
- Headquarters: Los Angeles, California, United States
- Area served: United States
- Key people: Chris Vaughn (CEO)
- Products: Alcoholic beverages and nicotine products
- Services: On-demand delivery
- Parent: Pacific Consolidated Holdings
- Website: saucey.com

Saucey is an American on-demand alcohol and nicotine product delivery service based in Los Angeles, California.

== History ==
Saucey was founded in Los Angeles in 2013 by Chris Vaughn, Daniel Leeb, and Andrew Zeck. In October 2013, Saucey launched its mobile application, serving the Los Angeles area.

After an initial period of being self-funded, Saucey raised $4.5 million in a seed funding round in September 2015. The round was led by Blumberg Capital and included investors such as Structure Capital, Altpoint Ventures, T5 Capital, and several angel investors. By this time, Saucey had expanded its service to San Diego, San Francisco, and Chicago.

In 2017, Saucey received $5.4 million in a Series A funding round led by Bullpen Capital.

Between 2018 and 2020, Saucey expanded its operations to the East Coast, including New York City and Washington, D.C.. In early 2020, Saucey experienced an increase in demand due to the COVID-19 pandemic. In response, Saucey introduced operational changes, including no-contact delivery procedures, and expanded its product offerings.

In October 2020, Saucey merged with Emjay, a cannabis delivery service, to form the parent company Pacific Consolidated Holdings (PCH). Saucey's co-founder, Chris Vaughn, became the CEO of PCH. Following the merger, Saucey continued its expansion. By late 2022, its service was available in 19 states and over 1,000 cities.
