= National Alcohol Beverage Control Association =

The National Alcohol Beverage Control Association (NABCA) was established in 1938 as the nationwide organization representing the interests of alcoholic beverage control states or monopoly sale states in the United States.

NABCA's stated mission is to support those states and areas in which governmental agencies exclusively wholesale and/or retail some form or forms (beer, wine or distilled spirits) of alcohol beverages by supporting member jurisdictions in their efforts to protect public health and safety and ensure responsible and efficient systems for beverage alcohol distribution and sales.

Currently, control jurisdictions represent approximately 25.2% of the nation's population. They account for roughly 22% of distilled spirit sales and a significantly smaller percentage of beer and wine sales.

== Leadership ==
Daniel Noble, chairman of the director of the Wyoming Department of Revenue, assumed the role of chair of the NABCA Board of Directors in May 2019. At the same time, A.D. "Zander" Guy, Jr, chairman of the NC ABC Commission, assumed the role of chair-elect.

== See also ==
See Alcoholic beverage control state for a list of "control states" and their exact level of control.
