= Rúsdrekkasøla Landsins =

- Company type: Government enterprise
- Industry: Alcoholic beverages, Non-alcoholic beverages
- Founded: November 2, 1992; 33 years ago
- Headquarters: Tórshavn, Faroe Islands
- Number of locations: 7
- Key people: Rógvi Andrias Fossádal (CEO)
- Products: Alcoholic beverages, Non-alcoholic beverages Wine, Liquor, Beer
- Revenue: ▲125.8 million DKK (2015)
- Operating income: ▲16.9 million DKK (2015)
- Number of employees: ca. 50
- Website: rusan.fo

Rúsdrekkasøla Landsins, or simply Rúsan, is the national alcoholic beverage retailing monopoly of the Faroe Islands, following the model of neighbouring Nordic alcohol monopolies Vinmonopolet, Systembolaget, Vínbúð and Alko. The company was founded in 1992 after a long period of rationing and shipping such goods from Denmark. The company has outlets in Tórshavn, Hoyvík, Klaksvík, Saltangará, Miðvágur, Sandur and Trongisvágur.

== See also ==
- Alcohol monopoly
- List of companies of the Faroe Islands
