= Alcohol monopoly =

Government monopoly on alcohol aiming to reduce consumption

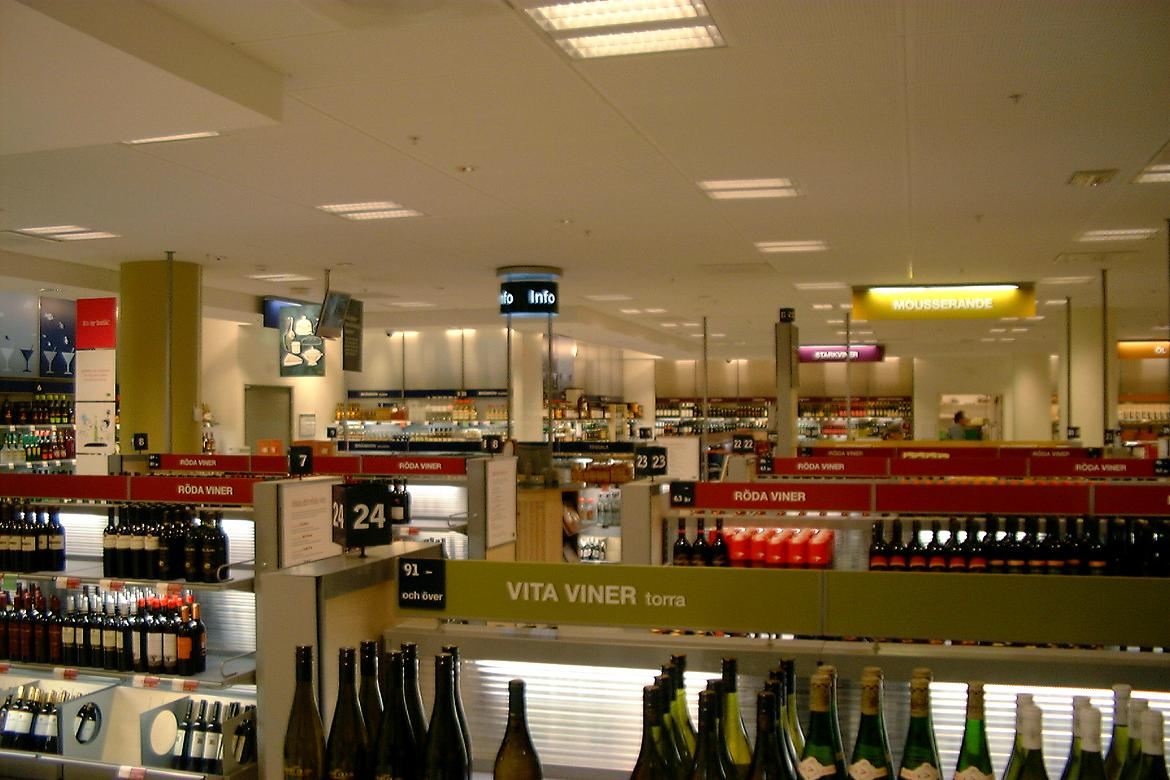
Inside of a branch of the Swedish alcohol monopoly, Systembolaget, in Södertälje

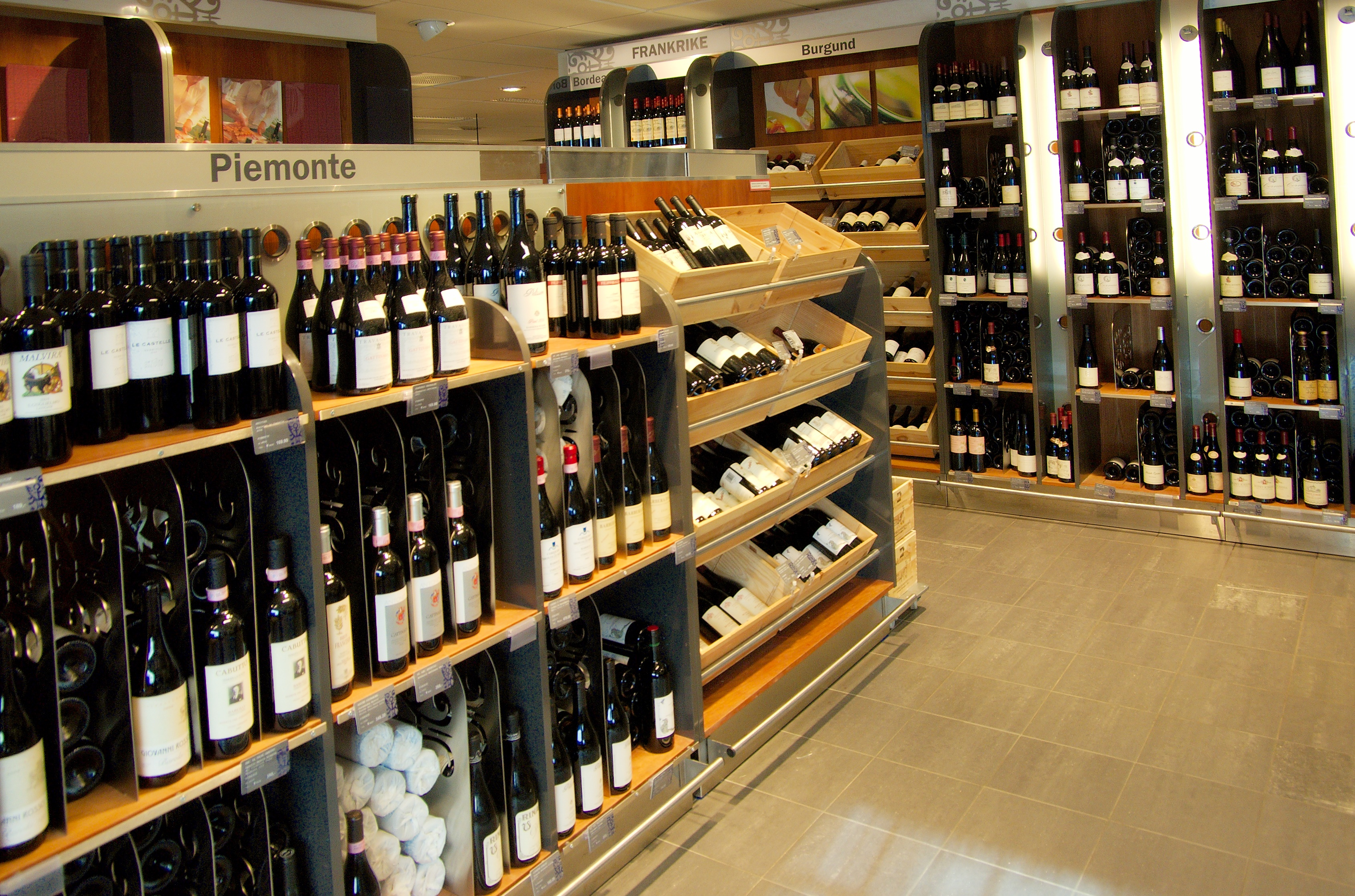
Inside the Norwegian Vinmonopolet Briskeby outlet

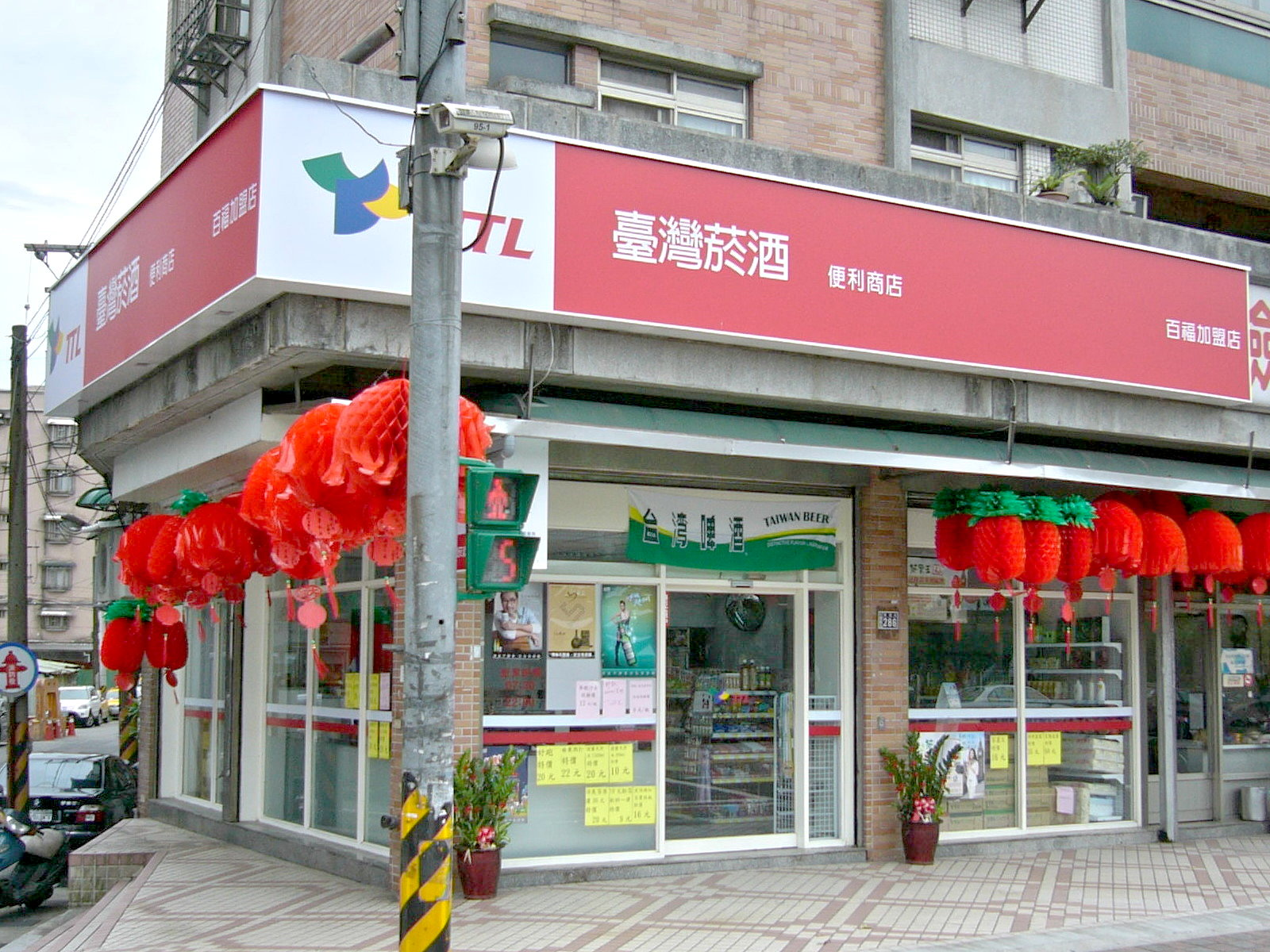
A TTL convenience store in Keelung, Taiwan

An alcohol monopoly is a government monopoly on manufacturing and/or retailing of some or all alcoholic beverages, such as beer, wine and spirits. It can be used as an alternative for total prohibition of alcohol. They exist in all Nordic countries except Denmark proper (only on the Faroe Islands), and in all provinces and territories in Canada except Alberta (which privatised its monopoly in 1993). In the United States, there are some alcoholic beverage control states, where alcohol wholesale is controlled by a state government operation and retail sales are offered by either state or private retailers.

An alcohol monopoly also existed in Taiwan between 1947 and 2002, which uniquely, did not actually serve as a form of reducing alcohol use, as was the case in the Nordic countries, Canada and the U.S., but was simply a continuation of the system established during Japanese rule of Taiwan. The Taiwanese market was gradually opened to overseas brands starting from 1987, with full liberalisation in 2002, the year when Taiwan was admitted to the WTO. Similarly, the alcohol monopoly in Turkey that existed between 1932 and 2008, was the continuation of the system established by the Ottoman Capitulations and did not serve for reducing alcohol usage.

== History ==
The first modern alcohol monopoly was created in the Swedish town of Falun in 1850, to prevent overconsumption and reduce the profit motive for sales of alcohol. It later went all over the country in 1905 when the Swedish parliament ordered all sales of vodka to be done via local alcohol monopolies. In 1894, the Russian Empire established a state monopoly on vodka, which became a major source of revenue for the Russian government.

Following the prohibition of alcohol in Norway in 1919, the wine-producing nations demanded a reflexive policy regarding the goods exported from Norway, and Vinmonopolet was established in 1922, as a response to a deal with France, which allowed Norwegians to buy as much table wine of any kind as they wanted. When prohibition was lifted on fortified wine in 1923 and spirits in 1926, Vinmonopolet assumed sales of these goods as well.

Unlike most of its Nordic neighbours, Denmark proper never had any period of alcohol prohibition or any state-owned alcohol monopoly, giving rise to its relatively liberal alcohol laws and drinking culture, however, the Faroe Islands, now a constituent country of the Kingdom of Denmark but then a county of Denmark, enacted alcohol prohibition in 1908 following a referendum held the previous year. Faroese people were however allowed to import very limited quantities of alcohol from Denmark proper for personal consumption after 1928, and after a referendum to lift prohibition in the Faroe Islands failed in 1973, the Faroe Islands finally lifted alcohol prohibition in 1992 with the establishment of the Rúsdrekkasøla Landsins alcohol monopoly that same year.

In Estonia, when the country was part of the Russian Empire, the abovementioned Russian Empire vodka monopoly was in place until 4 September 1914, when alcohol prohibition was enacted due to World War I. This prohibition lasted de facto until approximately 1917 and de jure until the end of World War I the following year. Alcohol prohibition was again enacted from 30 December 1918 until the spring of 1919 during Estonian War of Independence. As a result of social upheavals during said periods, the Estonian government, as an alternative to total prohibition, decided to institute the tšekisüsteem on 1 July 1920, which allowed individual municipalities to control the sale and distribution of alcoholic beverages, while the capital city of Tallinn additionally also allowed 25 fine dining restaurants to sell alcohol. Estonia abolished the tšekisüsteem on 31 December 1925 and retail sales of all alcoholic beverages began the following day.

In Latvia, similarly to Estonia, a government monopoly on the production of vodka (Latvian: valsts degvīna monopols) existed from 3 April 1920 until the Soviet occupation of Latvia in 1940. From 1922 to 1930, the spirits monopoly ensured from 12.7% to 18.4% of state revenue.

In the United Kingdom, the sale and distribution of alcohol in Carlisle, Gretna, Cromarty Firth and Enfield were nationalised as part of the State Management Scheme in order to reduce drunkenness for workers at the nearby armament factories during World War I. The Enfield scheme ended in 1921 and the remaining schemes ended in 1973 when they were privatised.

The Taiwan Tobacco and Liquor Corporation is the modern-day descendant of a government agency originally established during Japanese rule in 1901 which was responsible for all liquor and tobacco products in Taiwan as well as opium, salt, and camphor. In 1922, the agency began selling Takasago Beer through the Takasago Malted Beer Company, which was subsequently renamed as Taiwan Beer in 1946. After the end of World War II in 1945, the incoming Kuomintang preserved the monopoly system for alcohol and tobacco, and assigned the production of beer to the Taiwan Provincial Monopoly Bureau, which was renamed as Taiwan Tobacco and Wine Monopoly Bureau the following year. The Bureau exercised a monopoly on all alcohol and tobacco products sold in Taiwan until liberalisation of the Taiwanese alcohol market between 1987 and 2002, after which it was succeeded by the state-owned Taiwan Tobacco and Liquor Corporation which competes with many overseas brands today.

The Tamil Nadu State Marketing Corporation (TASMAC) is a company owned by the Government of Tamil Nadu, which has a monopoly over wholesale and retail vending of alcoholic beverages in the Indian state of Tamil Nadu. It controls the Indian-made foreign liquor (IMFL) trade in the state. A similar function is also performed by Kerala State Beverages Corporation (BEVCO) within the Indian state of Kerala.

The Tekel (literally monopoly in Turkish) was a state-owned company in Turkey between 1932 and 2008. The company itself was a continuation of the Régie founded in 1862, which was a parastatal company owned by the Ottoman Public Debt Administration and nationalized in 1925. Tekel had a complete monopoly over the sale of alcoholic beverages, beer, coffee, tobacco, salt and gunpowder; all of them except alcohol entered into and later released from the monopoly at different times. The company was privatized and sold to the British American Tobacco in 2008.

== Examples ==
=== Canada ===
- Provincial Liquor Crown Companies — Canada
  - BC Liquor Distribution Branch — British Columbia
  - Manitoba Liquor & Lotteries Corporation — Manitoba
  - New Brunswick Liquor Corporation — New Brunswick
  - Newfoundland and Labrador Liquor Corporation — Newfoundland and Labrador
  - Northwest Territories Liquor Commission — Northwest Territories
  - Nova Scotia Liquor Corporation — Nova Scotia
  - Nunavut Liquor and Cannabis Commission — Nunavut
  - Liquor Control Board of Ontario — Ontario
  - Prince Edward Island Liquor Control Commission — Prince Edward Island
  - Société des alcools du Québec — Quebec
  - Yukon Liquor Corporation — Yukon

=== India ===
- Kerala State Beverages Corporation — Kerala, India
- TASMAC — Tamil Nadu, India

=== Middle East ===
- Qatar Distribution Company – Qatar
- Tekel — Turkey (1932–2008)

=== Nordic countries ===
All Nordic countries except Denmark have a government monopoly on the sale of strong alcohol.

- Rúsdrekkasøla Landsins – Faroe Islands (1992–)
- Alko – Finland (1932–)
- Vínbúðin – Iceland (1961–)
- Vinmonopolet – Norway (1922–)
- Systembolaget – Sweden (1955–)

=== United States ===
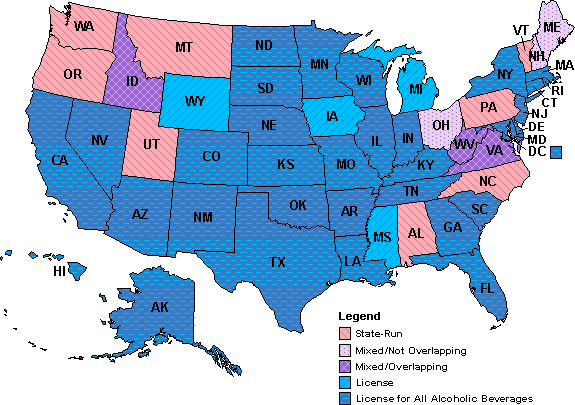
Retail distribution systems for alcohol in the U.S. as of January 1, 2007

- National Alcohol Beverage Control Association — United States
  - Oregon Liquor and Cannabis Commission — Oregon
  - Pennsylvania Liquor Control Board — Pennsylvania

== See also ==
- Alcoholic beverages in Sweden
- Temperance movement
