= 1907 Faroese alcohol referendum =

A four-part referendum on alcohol was held in the Faroe Islands on 6 November 1907. Voters were asked whether they approved of the trading and serving of beer, wine and spirits. All four proposals were rejected by voters. Following the referendum, prohibition was introduced in 1908 on all beverages with an alcohol content above 2%. An attempt in 1973 to overturn this ban was rejected in another referendum, but it was eventually lifted in 1992.

== Background ==
In 1907 the Løgting voted to hold a consultative referendum on banning alcohol. All men and women over the age of 25 were entitled to vote, the first time women had been able to do so.

== Results ==
Question	For		Against		Invalid	Total	Registered voters	Turnout	Outcome
Question	Votes	%	Votes	%	Invalid	Total	Registered voters	Turnout	Outcome
Trading in spirits	130	3.62	3,458	96.38			7,374		Rejected
Serving of spirits	104	2.93	3,443	97.07			7,374		Rejected
Trading in beer and wine	108	3.04	3,447	96.96			7,374		Rejected
Serving of beer and wine	110	3.11	3,431	96.89			7,374		Rejected
Source: Direct Democracy
