= Vinmonopolet =

State alcohol retailer in Norway

- Type: Government enterprise
- Industry: Wine, Liquor
- Founded: November 30, 1922; 103 years ago
- Headquarters: Oslo, Norway
- Number of locations: 331
- Key people: Kai G. Henriksen (CEO 2006–2016); Hilde Britt Mellbye (CEO)
- Products: Alcoholic beverages, Non-alcoholic beverages
- Number of employees: c. 2000
- Website: vinmonopolet.no

Vinmonopolet (English: The Wine Monopoly), symbolized by Ⓥ and colloquially shortened to Polet, is a government-owned alcoholic beverage retailer and the only company allowed to sell beverages containing an alcohol content higher than 4.75% in Norway.

As the arm of the Norwegian government policy to limit the citizens' consumption of alcohol, primarily by means of high cost and limited access, the primary goal of Vinmonopolet is to responsibly perform the distribution of alcoholic goods while limiting the motive of private economic profit from the alcohol industry. Equally significant is the social responsibility of Vinmonopolet, to prevent the sale of alcohol to minors and visibly inebriated customers.

Outlets, located across the country from cities to smaller communities, typically close business earlier than other shops, typically weekdays at 6 pm and Saturdays at 4 pm. In 2020 Vinmonopolet sold 115 million litres (30 million US gallons) of beverages.

== Foundation ==
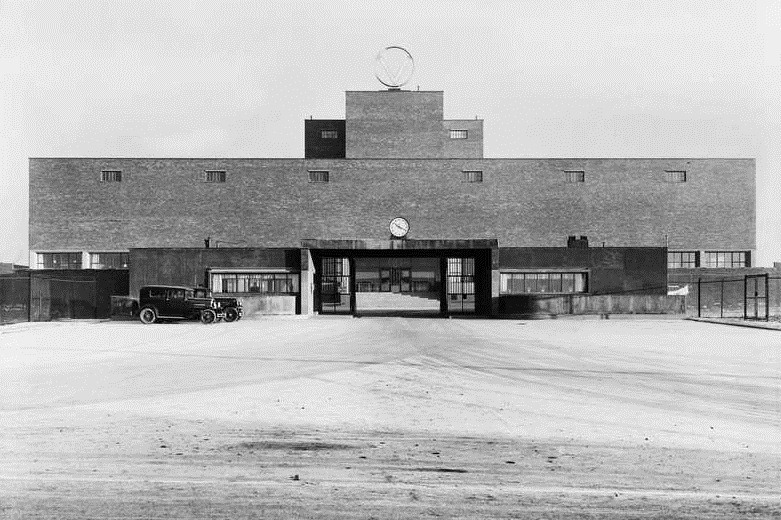
The former Vinmonopolet headquarters in Hasle, Oslo. Image believed to date from 1932.

The institution was founded in 1922 as a government-owned company as the result of trade negotiations with wine exporters, mainly in France. The ban on alcohol was lifted, and sale was allowed through outlets run by Vinmonopolet.

Since 1939 the state, initially through the Norwegian Ministry of Finance and later the Norwegian Ministry of Health and Care Services, has been the sole owner, buying out the private shareholders while remaining a stock company.

The company's import and production activities ceased in 1996 when the EFTA ruled that the monopoly was in violation of the EEA agreement. The company divided into the created company entity Arcus which continued all production, import and distribution activity of spirits, leaving Vinmonopolet as a sole retail monopoly.

In 1999 the format of the outlets was restructured, making nearly all stores self service from the previous format of sales over the counter, and internet sales began in 2002.

=== Special shops ===
Initially, two Vinmonopolet outlets were launched in 2005–06 as "special stores" category A, located in Oslo (Briskeby, relocated to Vika in March 2010) and Bergen (Valkendorfsgaten), and a branch of smaller category B stores in were added during 2012–13 in Oslo west, Sandnes, Hamar, Sandefjord and Trondheim. In February 2014 the Bergen Valkendorfsgaten store was adjusted to category B on a par with the other five limited special stores, leaving Oslo Vika the sole category A special store, and the sale of fine wine and beer in Sandnes was divided between two outlets, Sentrum and Kvadrat. In January 2015 the flagship specialty store moved its location from Vika to Aker Brygge.

The special stores arrange major launches of new products on six occasions annually, to supplement a special selection (of approximately 750 products at category A level) that is not available in the ordinary product list, of wines, fortified wines or beers, described to be "either innovative, of limited availability or of an exceptionally high quality". Each launch carries a theme, and while there may be changes from year to year, regular fixtures are the launch of wines from Bordeaux in December, wines from Burgundy in February, wines from Germany in April, Champagne and Chablis in May, and beer and U.S. wines in October. Smaller groups of products that fall outside the launch themes may appear at any other time during the year. As with all wine purchases in the normal outlets, Vinmonopolet guarantees the provenance of these uncommon wines, and the customer retains the regular right to return faulty wine for the money back within five years of purchase.

Though the available quantities of the special release wines can be very limited, some wines so sparse they entail minimal purchasing quotas in order to reach a wider public, prices may be as low as ⅓ or ¼ of world market value. As a result of considerable enthusiasm surrounding these product launches, customer behaviour has come under criticism for sinking to an uncivilised level.

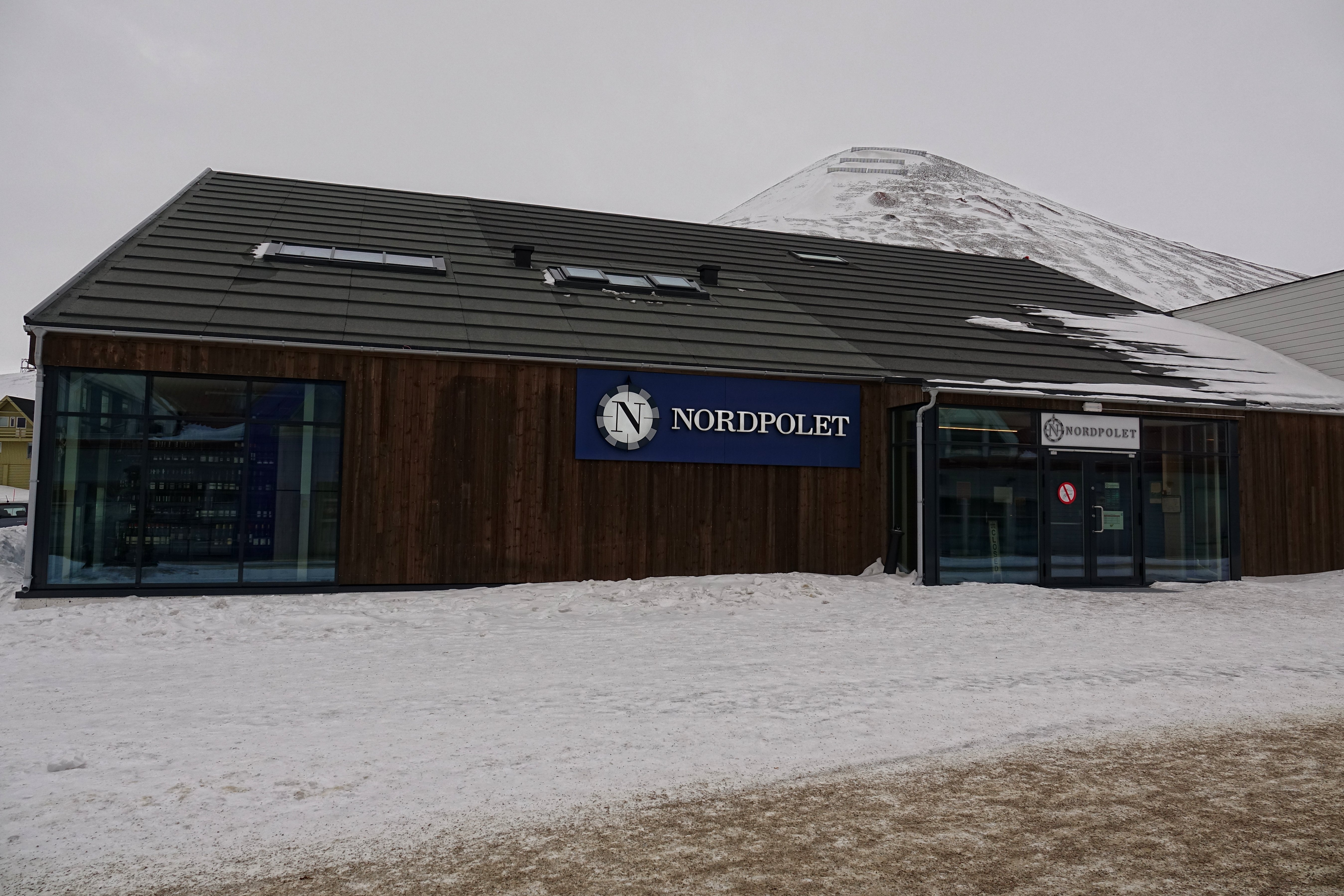
Nordpolet on Svalbard

Vinmonopolet is not established on Svalbard. Instead the government can license private alcohol shops, of which there is only one, "Nordpolet" in Longyearbyen. In addition mining companies can sell alcohol to employees. There are monthly sales quotas on Svalbard. The taxes and therefore prices are much lower on Svalbard than mainland Norway.

=== Wine auctions ===
In December 2008, Vinmonopolet announced plans to implement a system of arranging auctions of second-hand wine, similar to the model in use by Swedish Systembolaget. Under Norwegian law, it was illegal to sell alcohol by auction, until a resolution by Stortinget changed this law in April 2011, effective from 1 January 2012. While Vinmonopolet is to draw no profit from these activities, the process of selecting a collaborating auction house resulted in the tender eventually awarded to the auction house Blomqvist in Oslo, with the first wine auction of Norway held on 25 November 2013, and simultaneously an expanded Internet auction was arranged due to the unexpected scale of interest.

== Consumer relations ==
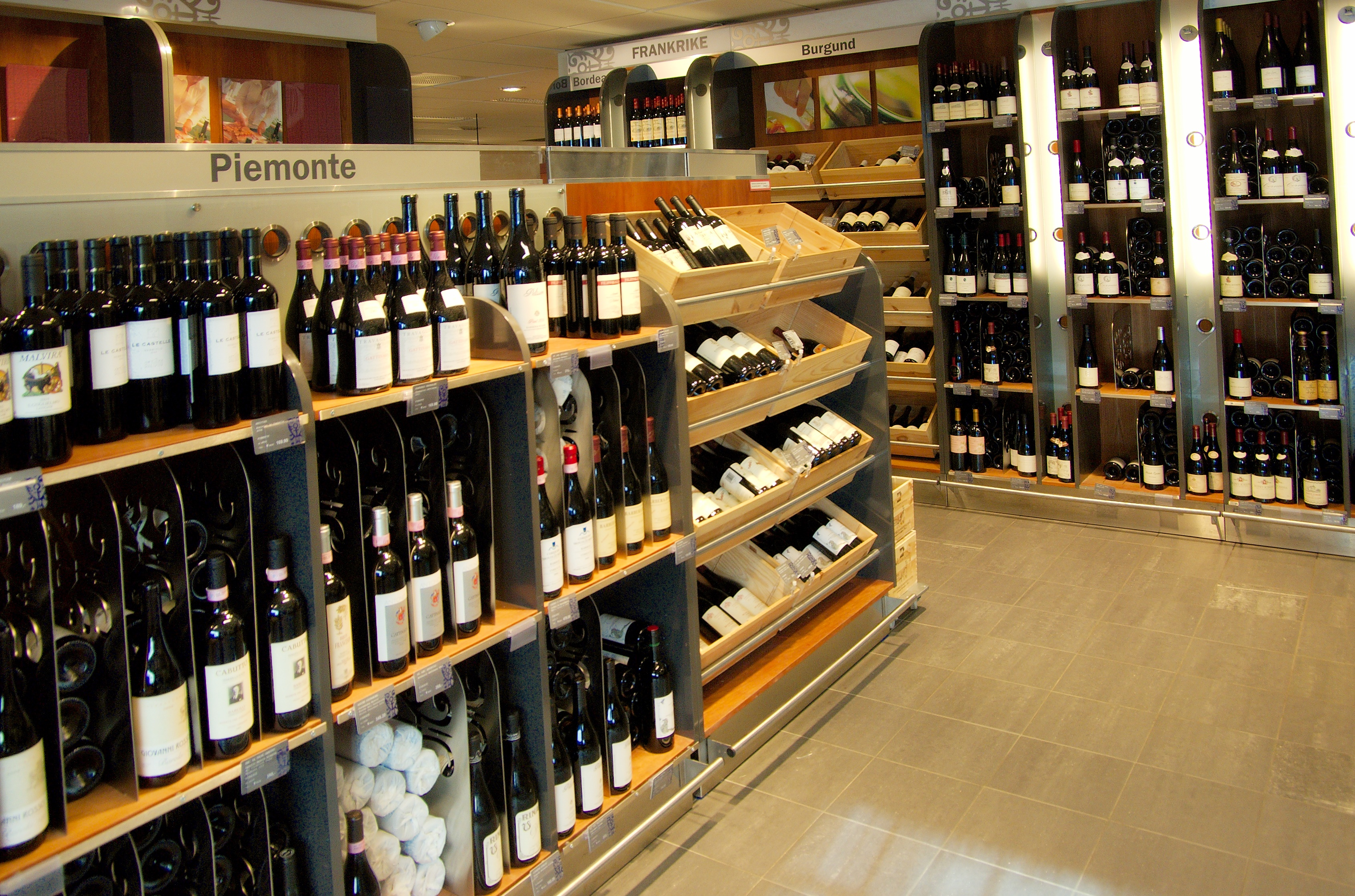
Inside the Vinmonpolet Briskeby outlet

In a 2008 survey by Norsk Kundebarometer, customers of the monopoly were 81.5% satisfied with the company, ranking it 4th in Norway, a figure that rose to 88% in 2009. There were critical voices such as Tom Marthinsen, then wine critic of Dagens Næringsliv, that questioned the institution's selection process of allowing a small self-recruited group, termed "the taste bureaucracy", to make the wine buying decisions on behalf of the entire Norwegian people.

Surveys from the mid-1990s indicated a majority of the Norwegian population were in support of dissolving the monopoly arrangement, and allowing for the sale of wine by the private sector. Since the restructuring of 1996, the consumer satisfaction has increased. A 2013 TNS Gallup poll showed that 74% of the population wanted to keep the monopoly while 22% wanted to dissolve it.

Economists have praised Vinmonopolet for being a well-working monopoly that offers good customer service.

Robert Lie, then sommelier of Bagatelle, has stated, "I am among the supporters. In recent years Vinmonopolet has had great impact on the wine interest of the average Norwegian. To my knowledge there are no wine stores in the world with an equal selection. There are also fairly good prices for more expensive wines. For highly coveted wines one must pay much more in London." Torkjell Berulfsen, presenter of considerable TV programming with focus on alcoholic goods, has stated, "These days I praise Vinmonopolet into the clouds. I bless it! I don't dare imagine some zitty, unmotivated 25-year-old 'red wine supervisor' at Rimi!"

Arne Ronold MW has pointed to the formats of UK and Denmark as successful alternatives that offer good selections in supermarkets and specialty stores, while stating that the present situation offers a wide selection for consumers in certain areas but with considerably more limited options for some other areas, and while more costly wines may be less expensive in the Vinmonopolet format, this is a "positive side-effect of a market that doesn't work, being of little benefit to the average consumer". He acknowledges "a near-revolution in that at present there are more than 10,000 products available, which is wonderful", adding, "I have been among the most ardent critics but have mildened somewhat. I am adequately satisfied with Vinmonopolet as it is now. But they still have some way to go concerning aged wine and the second hand market. In this, access is poor." Ronold's publication Vinforum which 1986 founding was motivated by the perceived poor performance of Vinmonopolet, whose Italian wine selection then totalled 14 labels including reds, whites and sparkling. By 2010 the category had risen past 2,000 labels, leading co-founder Ola Dybvik to declare, "we are living in paradise", continuing in context that the Norwegian population is comparable to a New York suburb: "in terms of selection, the store has moved into the definitive world elite".

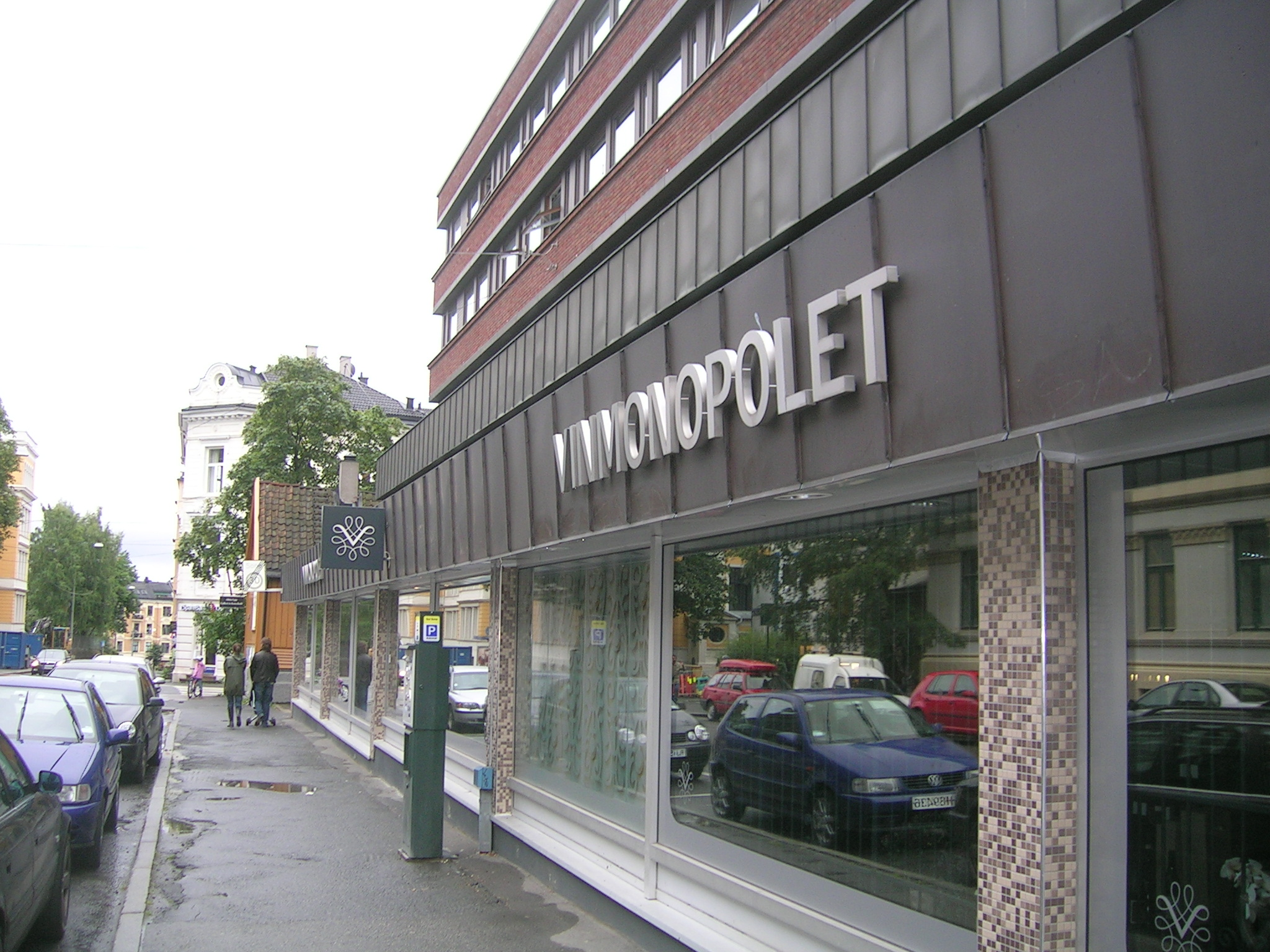
Exterior of Vinmonopolet in Briskeby

In a Dagens Næringsliv commentary, Tom Marthinsen also acknowledged the progress from the conditions of the 1990s, but was critical to the direction of applying new techniques from chain stores which led to standardization of the urban outlets, while contending that the rural stores have a "catastrophical selection", and these consumers from "the districts" would benefit from purchasing wine in their local food store. Marthinsen called upon the leadership to "set free the store buyers, reinstate the competitive element between the stores, in other words leave behind the chain store mentality and allow local creativity to flourish".

The institution has not stayed clear of problems. In one instance in 2001, the published price list offered Château Latour at the incredibly priced NOK 555, where an estimate would normally be approximately NOK 2,600, causing the quickest three customers to order to buy up the entire inventory, with the intent to make a fast and considerable profit. The explanation was that the more modestly priced Château Latour à Pomerol had its name listing edited down for brevity.

In 2010 Vinmonopolet offered more than 12,000 products, next to 2009 figures from comparative retailers such as Systembolaget which offered ca. 9,000 products, Alko of Finland with ca. 3,000 products available, or British Waitrose with ca. 1,500 products available. By the end of 2016, the range of products had reached near 17,000 items.

== Corruption cases ==
In what is known as Dysthesaken (the Dysthe case) in 1930 exposed flaws in the goods acquisition procedures of Vinmonopolet, and as a consequence changes were made to the procedures. The leadership were sentenced for combining company and personal interests, and the influence and power of individuals in purchasing decisions were reduced after the process. Following this, a law of 19 July 1931 (Vinmonopolloven, the wine monopoly law) came into effect.

Ekjordsaken, (the Ekjord case) uncovered in 2005, brought new allegations of corruption against employees and leadership of Vinmonopolet. A probe led by Erling Grimstad exposed that the importer firm Ekjord A/S over the course of several years had sponsored outlet leaders by arranging luxury dining and accommodations as well as other gifts in order to influence purchases and placement of their products within the stores. Membership in this exclusive group was symbolized by the gift of a tastevin. Several Vinmonopolet leaders admitted to having received wines and other perks, which led to reprimands of 9 individuals, two of whom were dismissed.

The initiating factor came when an employee who had been fired from Ekjord A/S, sued against wrongful dismissal. The scandal escalated as the media discovered the particulars of the lawsuit, with Lindin as the chief source of allegations that would result in wide consequences. During the trial the elaborate "grease culture" in the company Ekjord A/S was uncovered. Knut Grøholt withdrew from the position of CEO of Vinmonopolet later that year, and in August 2006 was replaced by Kai G. Henriksen.

== Vinbladet ==
Vinbladet November/December 2010, its cover depicting manservant James and Miss Sophie

Having long planned to publish a magazine aimed at consumers as was already done by Systembolaget in Sweden, in 1988 Vinmonopolet launched Vinbladet ("The Wine Magazine" or "The Vine Leaf"), distributed to customers free of charge. The magazine's name had been used precisely 60 years previously for the internal publication which provided information to employees about the sold goods. The rationale was that as Vinmonopolet were in the business of selling culture, they wanted to do so with culture, making information available crucial.

A professional editor was engaged, and the publication printed on glossy paper contained images of a commercial nature depicting the diverse nations' wine regions and wine production, and articles on various subjects connected to food, wine and spirits. The Norwegian temperance movement reacted negatively and responded with press declarations accusing Vinmonopolet of attempting to popularise alcohol use, rather than limit it. The criticism from the temperance movement also maintained that the alcohol in wine did not distinguish itself from the alcohol in hard spirits, that "fine dining" customs functioned as a gateway to alcohol problems, and that the cultural projects of Vinmonopolet could well lead to family tragedies, destroyed lives, fear and death.

== Notable past products ==
=== Rødvin ===
When the German occupation forces withdrew from Norway in 1945, there remained behind 400,000 litres of Bordeaux wine which became the foundation of the generic "Rødvin" ("Red wine"), the best selling wine in Norway over several decades, which is accredited as a cornerstone in "cultivating Norwegian drinking culture". Nicknamed "Château Hasle" (from the location name of the Vinmonopolet headquarters) and "Sekskroners" ("costing six kroner"), sales of the brand are estimated in excess of 120 million litres, it eventually ceased being the national top seller due to the arrival of inexpensive Chilean and Italian wines by 1998.

The initial blends consisting of Bordeaux wines from the 1934 and 1937 vintages, along with simple German and Italian wine, were sold from 1 January 1946 for NOK total of 4.50, both Rødvin and Hvitvin (White wine), all sold out by 1947. As the successive imports of wine from Algeria, Tunisia and Chile marketed under other names failed to sell well, an initiative was made in 1949 to compose a new blended wine for the people, affordable and easily drinkable. Purchasing director Haakon Svensson was given a set budget and assigned to negotiate deals with wine producers, initially securing deals with winemakers from Le Midi, Valencia and Algeria, with an aim to produce a blended wine that could decrease the Norwegian people's vast consumption of liquor, at the time ten to one the ratio of the consumption of wine.

On sale from 1 February 1950 at the total price of NOK 6 (NOK 4 + 50% tax), the price remained fixed until 1968, causing it to be widely known as "the six kroner wine". By 1970 it cost NOK 7, and by 1990 it had risen to NOK 43. Normally blended from 5 to 10 wines, from locations that later also included Cyprus and Turkey, Rødvin was in 1972 responsible for 40% of all wine sold in Norway, leading up to the peak of its popularity in the 1980s. In 1981 there was sold 3.8 million liter, while by 2000 Rødvin production had been transferred to Arcus and annual sales had decreased to 700,000 liters.

In August 2014 it was announced that bottles of Rødvin would be removed from the standard Vinmonopolet shelf selection by the following October, following a run of 54 vintages, after this to be available by order under the altered name "Folkets Originale Rødvin" (the people's original red wine).

=== Golden Power ===
Golden Power was a Norwegian-produced sparkling fruit wine (not to be confused with an energy drink of the same name), made of 70% rhubarb, 20% apple and 10% grape juice, which was produced by Vingården (the Røed farm in Filtvet, in the Tofte area, in Hurum), associated with owner Frantz Michaelsen. The product was removed from Vinmonopolet selection in 2006.

Vingården was considered part of the local culture, and Golden Power deemed by some a rare, innovative Norwegian product. Traditions of winemaking were established in 1886, and Vingården came to have a production capacity of some 800,000 litres while the production process of Golden Power was claimed to last for four years. Near the end of its production, the company produced between 20,000 and 25,000 bottles annually.

== See also ==
- Rúsdrekkasøla Landsins
- Vínbúðin
- Alko
