= List of alcohol laws of the United States =

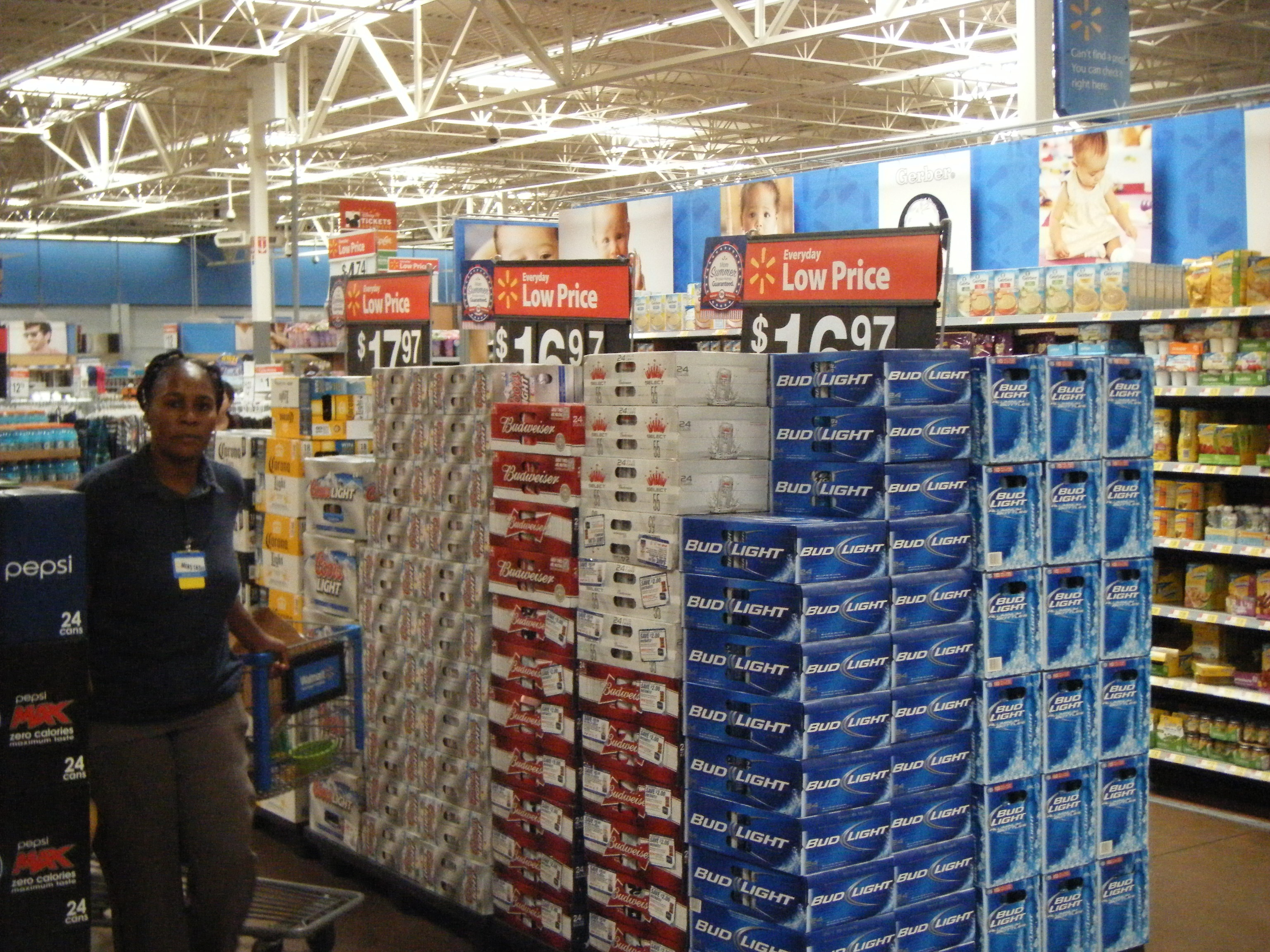
Beer at a Walmart in Kissimmee, Florida. Some states permit alcoholic beverages to be sold at all stores selling groceries while others have more restrictive laws, with laws of many states specifying different restrictions for different categories of alcoholic beverages.

In the United States, the Twenty-first Amendment to the United States Constitution grants each state and territory the power to regulate intoxicating liquors within their jurisdiction. As such, laws pertaining to the production, sale, distribution, and consumption of alcohol vary significantly across the country.

On July 17, 1984, the National Minimum Drinking Age Act was enacted. The Act required all states to either set their minimum age to purchase alcoholic beverages and the minimum age to possess alcoholic beverages in public to no lower than 21 years of age or lose 10% (Changed to 8% in 2012) of their allocated federal highway funding if the minimum age for the aforementioned is lower than 21 years of age. As of July 1988, all 50 states and the District of Columbia had a minimum purchase age of 21, with some grandfather clauses, and with the exception of Louisiana's complicated legal situation that was not resolved until July 2, 1996. Prior to 1988, the minimum purchase age varied by jurisdiction. After enactment of the Act, states not in compliance had a portion of their federal highway budget withheld. South Dakota and Wyoming were the final two states to comply, in mid-1988. Since the Act does not restrict the minimum drinking age or the minimum age to possess alcohol in private, most states continue to allow those under 21 to drink in certain circumstances. Examples are some states like Tennessee and Washington, which allow those under 21 to drink for religious purposes. States including Oregon and New York allow those under 21 to drink on private non-alcohol selling premises. Some states like Ohio allow under 21 to drink in private and public including bars and restaurants if accompanied by parents, guardians, or spouse that is 21 or older.

The National Highway System Designation Act of 1995 requires all states to impose a "zero-tolerance law" prohibiting drivers under 21 years of age from operating a motor vehicle with at least 0.02% blood alcohol content to discourage underage drinking. Any state that did not comply would have up to 10 percent of its federal highway funding withheld, the same strategy used to compel states into raising their drinking age to 21.

Unlike within the United States, the United States territories of Puerto Rico and the United States Virgin Islands have a minimum purchasing age and drinking age of 18 since the language of the Act only applies the provisions of the Act to states. The minimum purchase age is 21 in the Northern Mariana Islands, Guam, American Samoa, and U.S. Minor Outlying Islands.

United States military reservations are exempt under federal law from state, county, and locally enacted alcohol laws. Class Six stores in a base exchange facility, officers' or NCO clubs, as well as other military commissaries which are located on a military reservation, may sell and serve alcoholic beverages at any time during their prescribed hours of operation to authorized patrons. (Note: The United States Department of Defense defines Authorized Patron as a person who is an active member of or a member who has the status of honorably retired from the United States Army, United States Air Force, United States Coast Guard, United States Marine Corps, and the United States Navy, and their direct dependents with proper military identification/dependents identification.) While the installation commander is free to set the drinking age, with some exceptions, most stateside military bases have a drinking age that mirrors the local community.

Individual states remain free to restrict or prohibit the manufacture of beer, mead, hard cider, wine, and other fermented alcoholic beverages at home. Homebrewing beer became legal in all 50 states in 2013 as the governors of Mississippi and Alabama both signed bills legalizing homebrewing that year. The Alabama bill went into effect on May 9, and the Mississippi bill went into effect on July 1. Most states allow brewing 100 US gallons (380 L) of beer per adult per year and up to a maximum of 200 US gallons (760 L) per household annually when there are two or more adults residing in the household. Because alcohol is taxed by the federal government via excise taxes, homebrewers are prohibited from selling any beer they brew. This similarly applies in most Western countries. In 1979, President Jimmy Carter signed into law a bill allowing home beers, which was at the time not permitted without paying the excise taxes as a holdover from the prohibition of alcoholic beverages (repealed in 1933). This change also exempted home brewers from posting a "penal bond" (which is currently $1,000.00).

Production of liquor (distilled beverages) is regulated at the national level under USC Title 26 subtitle E Ch51. Numerous requirements must be met to do so, and production carries an excise tax. Owning or operating a distillation apparatus without filing the proper paperwork and paying the taxes carries federal criminal penalties.

In land or property that is being rented or owned by the federal government, state, federal district, and territory alcohol laws do not apply. Instead, only laws made by the federal government apply.

== Table ==
=== Alabama–Hawaii ===
State federal district or territory	Alcoholic beverage control state			Alcohol sale hours		Grocery store sales			Age		Notes
State federal district or territory	Beer	Wine	Distilled spirits	On-premises	Off-premises	Beer	Wine	Distilled Spirits	Purchasing	Consumption	Notes
Alabama	Yes			Prohibited between midnight and noon on Sundays in some counties. Private clubs, which require a membership fee and a membership card, have no day or time restrictions.		Yes		No	21	21 No exceptions to the law	13.9% ABV cap on beer Beer containers may not exceed 25.4 ounces (0.75 L); ABV > 14.9% wine sold in ABC stores Alcohol may be served 24 hours a day unless restricted by local ordinances. Twenty-six of Alabama's 67 counties do not allow the sale of alcohol. However, possession and consumption remain legal within those 26 counties. Of the 26 "dry" counties, 23 have at least one "wet" city; these are considered "moist" dry counties. Within those 23 counties there are 43 wet cities. State law allows any city with a population greater than 1,000 located within a dry county to "go wet" if a referendum is passed by 50% of voters. State retains monopoly over wholesaling of distilled spirits only. Distilled spirits (liquor) are purchasable in either state-owned retail liquor stores, known as ABC stores, or privately owned retail liquor stores. Privately owned retail liquor stores tend to be open on Sundays, public (federal & state) holidays, and later hours than state-owned liquor stores. State-owned liquor stores are closed on Sundays and public holidays. If a state-owned liquor store is located in an unincorporated area, only the state sales tax and county sales tax is collected.
Alaska	No			8 a.m. – 5 a.m., except election days (liquor stores may not open until polls close)		No (although many grocery stores have separate areas that sell all forms of alcoholic beverages and many bars sell packaged liquor as well)			21	21 Exception: Underage drinking allowed for medical purposes, and on private non-alcohol selling premises with parental consent	Most communities have more restrictive laws, ranging from restrictions on operating hours to bans on sale and possession. Sellers or servers may not, for any reason, give a person alcohol for free or sell it for less than its cost. Sellers and servers may drink while on duty, but no intoxicated person may remain on the premises, so an impaired server could be arrested.
Arizona	No			6 a.m. – 2 a.m. seven days a week—no election day nor holiday restrictions		Yes			21	21 Exception: Underage drinking allowed for religious and medical purposes	Sales of any type of alcohol are legal at any store that has an off-premises liquor license, including but not limited to convenience stores and grocery stores. Bars may sell closed containers of alcohol for consumption off the premises. Drive-through liquor stores are allowed. Rectified spirit of 190 proof (95% ABV) is legal. A large percentage of the land area of Arizona is on Indian reservations, many of which have liquor laws considerably more restrictive than state law, up to and including total prohibition. "Beer busts" (all the beer/liquor one can drink for a set price) in bars are illegal. Persons 18 years of age or older may work in bars and liquor stores serving and selling alcohol. Patrons may not purchase for on premises consumption more than 50 ounces of beer, 1 liter of wine or 4 ounces of distilled spirits at one time. DUI penalties are some of the most severe in the nation. A person convicted of a DUI (even first offense) must have an interlock installed in his car for one year. Arizona has an 'Impaired to the Slightest Degree' law that can convict a person even if his BAC is less than .08%. As a driver's BAC increases, so does the severity of the legal consequences they face. A driver with a BAC between .15 and .20 may face "extreme DUI" charges, and a driver with a BAC above .20 may face "super extreme DUI" charges.
Arkansas	No			7 a.m. – 1 a.m. (Restaurants); 7 a.m. – 2 a.m. (Class A license); 10 a.m. – 5 a.m. (Class B license)	7 a.m. – 1 a.m. (Generally prohibited on Sundays, but exceptions can be made through local option.)	Yes		No	21	21 No exceptions to the law	Has numerous dry counties and other dry areas, but private clubs can serve even in dry areas. No sales on Christmas Day. Alcohol sales are permitted 24 hours a day 7 days a week regardless of holiday in state casinos.
California	No			6 a.m. – 2 a.m.		Yes			21	21 Exception: A minor will not be penalized for possessing or consuming alcohol if: (1)The underage person called 911 and reported that either himself or herself or another person was in need of medical assistance due to alcohol consumption; (2) The underage person was the first person to make the 911 report; and (3) The underage person, who reported that another person was in need of medical assistance, remained on the scene with the other person until that medical assistance arrived and cooperated with medical assistance and law enforcement personnel on the scene.	Relatively unrestricted; beer, wine and liquor available at grocery stores, convenience stores, gas stations, and warehouse clubs. No statewide holiday restrictions. Motor vehicles entering from Mexico may only import 1 liter of alcohol (duty-free). Sale or distribution of grain alcohol higher than 60% ABV is illegal (legal if it is sold by a pharmacy or drug store to a person with a prescription), but there is no upper limit for other distilled liquors (B&P 23403). You may serve alcohol if you are at least 21 years of age. City and county governments can set different sale hours. 18-, 19- and 20-year-old wine and beer production students can taste—but not consume—what they are making and studying. Responsible Beverage Service (RBS) certification is mandatory for on-premises alcohol servers and managers statewide (effective July 1, 2022).
Colorado	No			7 a.m. – 2 a.m.	Beer, wine, and liquor: 8 a.m. – midnight 3.2 beer: 5 a.m.-midnight	Yes		No*	21	21 Exception: Underage consumption allowed for religious, medical, and educational purposes, or on private, non-alcohol selling premises with parental/guardian presence and consent.	Spirituous, vinous & malt liquor available in liquor stores and liquor-licensed drug stores only. Liquor stores closed on Christmas Day. Sunday sales restriction lifted on July 1, 2008. Liquor stores and liquor-licensed drug stores may have only one location, while beer may be sold in gas stations, supermarkets, and convenience stores. As of January 1, 2019, such establishments may sell full-strength beer, and as of March 1, 2023, wine. Appropriately licensed businesses may sell beer for both on and off-premises consumption. A small number of grocery stores are licensed as drug stores and sell full strength beer, wine, and spirits. As an example, a chain grocery store that has pharmacy services at most or all locations may elect a single location in the chain as the licensed establishment to sell beer, wine, and spirits.
Connecticut	No			9 a.m. – 1 a.m. (Mon.–Thurs.); 9 a.m. – 2 a.m. (Fri.–Sat.); 11 a.m. – 1 a.m. (Sun.)	8 a.m. – 10 p.m. (Mon.–Sat.) 10 a.m. – 6 p.m. (Sun.)	Yes	No		21 Exception: No explicit age if a present legal guardian is 21 or older	21 Exception: Underage consumption is allowed on private non alcohol selling premises with parental consent, for medical and religious purposes, and on alcohol selling premises with parental consent.	Sunday off-premises sales allowed as of May 20, 2012; Sunday on-premises sales subject to local ordinances. Beer can be purchased at grocery/convenience stores. Spirits and wine can be purchased only at liquor stores. No off-premises alcohol sales on Thanksgiving, Christmas Day, and New Year's Day. Open container law applies only to drivers, not passengers.
Delaware	No			9 a.m. – 1 a.m.	9 a.m. – 1 a.m. (Mon.–Sat.) noon–8 p.m. (Sun.) Municipalities with a population over 50,000 persons may impose stricter hours of sale by local ordinance.	No			21	21 Exception: A minor will not be penalized for if discovered consuming alcohol through a medical emergency. Underage drinking allowed on private non-alcohol selling premises with parental consent, for religious purposes.	For off-premises consumption, alcohol may be purchased only in a liquor store, taproom, or a brew pub that has an off-premises license. Unless accompanied by a parent or guardian over 21, no person under 21 may enter a liquor store or taproom for any reason, even for the intent of purchasing only tobacco or lottery tickets. No sales of alcohol by liquor stores or taprooms are permitted during designated holidays including Thanksgiving, Easter or Christmas.
District of Columbia	No			8 a.m. – 2 a.m. Sun.–Thu., 8 a.m. – 3 a.m. Fri.–Sat.	Liquor Stores: 9 a.m. – midnight daily* Grocery Stores: 9 a.m.-12 a.m. daily	Yes		No	21	21 Exception: A minor will not be penalized for if discovered consuming alcohol through a medical emergency.	*Liquor stores can begin applying for licenses to open on Sunday as of January 16, 2013. No singles sold, but stores in some areas may apply for an exemption. Certain wards may be made dry by the decision of the local ANC, but as of 2005 none are The day before a federal or district holiday, on-premises retailers may sell/serve from 8 a.m.-3 a.m. On New Year's Eve, on-premises retailers may sell/serve until 4 a.m. on January 1.
Florida	No			State, federal district or territory law prohibits selling of alcohol between midnight and 7 a.m., unless the county chooses to change the operating hours later (FS 562.14(1)); such as for Sunday morning; Ormond Beach stays open until 7 pm on Sundays. Miami-Dade County liquor stores may operate 24 hours a day.		Yes		No	21	21 Exception: 18 for educational purposes	Sale, processing or consumption of any liquor or spirit of greater than 153 proof is illegal. (FSS 565.07) No retail sale of wine in containers larger than 1 gallon. FS 564.05 Supermarkets and other licensed business establishments may sell beer, low-alcohol liquors, and wine. Liquor must be sold in dedicated liquor stores which may be in a separate part of a grocery or a drug store. As of July 1, 2015, the restriction on 64 ounce refillable containers, or growlers, has been lifted and beer may be sold in quantities of 64 ounces, in addition to the previously legal 32 and 128 ounce sizes.
Georgia	No			Hours of sale determined by local jurisdiction. No alcohol sales on Christmas Day.		Yes		No	21	21 Exception: Underage drinking allowed on non-alcoholic premises with parental consent, and for religious and medical purposes.	14% ABV cap on beer. Sunday off-premises sales from 12:30 p.m. to 11:30 p.m. allowed only by local referendum. In general, one may not be drunk in public. Though there is no state law prohibiting drinking in public, most municipal corporations and political subdivisions limit the possession of open containers of alcohol to private property, with notable exceptions being Savannah and Roswell. A charge of public drunkenness is only warranted when one is drunk in public and his acts are either loud or disorderly.
Hawaii	No			Bars and restaurants stop serving alcohol at 2 a.m., but some hold a special 'cabaret license' that allows them to continue serving alcohol until 4 a.m.	6 a.m. to 12 a.m. Within Honolulu County; 6 a.m. to 11 p.m. Within Kauai, Maui, and Hawaii counties	Yes			21	21 Exception: Underage consumption allowed for religious purposes	

=== Idaho–Massachusetts ===
State federal district or territory	Alcoholic beverage control state			Alcohol sale hours		Grocery store sales			Age		Notes
State federal district or territory	Beer	Wine	Distilled spirits	On-premises	Off-premises	Beer	Wine	Distilled Spirits	Purchasing	Consumption	Notes
Idaho	No		Yes	6:00 a.m. to 2:00 a.m., 7:00 a.m. to 1:00 a.m. in some counties		Yes		No	21	21	Alcoholic beverages exceeding 16% ABV can only be sold in Idaho State Liquor Dispensary stores, or contracted stores.
Illinois	No			Depending on local government; a handful of 21- to 22-hour bars exist in Cook County, and the Metro East.		Yes			21	21	Opening/closing hours are up to the decision of counties or municipalities.
Indiana	No			7 a.m. – 3 a.m.	7 a.m. – 3 a.m. Noon - 8 p.m. on Sunday.	Yes					Indiana prohibits the sales of cold beer by grocery stores or gas stations, but allows cold beer to be sold from liquor stores (IC 7.1-5-10-11). Sales during a portion of the day (e.g., happy hours) are prohibited, but all-day drink specials are allowed (IC 7.1-5-10-20). Minors, including babies, are not allowed to enter liquor stores, taverns, or bars (IC 7.1-5-7-9). Indiana has a photo identification requirement for all off-premises transactions to anyone who appears to be less than 40 years old. (IC 7.1-5-10-23). Public intoxication is a class B misdemeanor. (IC 7.1-5-1-3)
Iowa	No		Yes	6 a.m. – 2 a.m.		Yes			21	21 Exception: In Iowa, minors under 18 can legally drink in a private residence under the supervision of their parents.	If a controlled substance is detected in a person's system at or near the time they were operating a motor vehicle, they can be charged and potentially convicted of operating while intoxicated (OWI) even if they were not "impaired" by that substance
Kansas	No			6 a.m. - 2 a.m. (in counties which allow on-premises sales)	9 a.m. - 11 p.m. (Mon–Sat); 9 a.m. - 8 p.m. (Sun) (in communities which allow Sunday off-premises sales)	Yes (6.0% ABV maximum)	No		21	21 Exceptions: Kansas law permits underage alcohol consumption only if provided by a parent or legal guardian for the supervised consumption of cereal malt beverages containing 3.2% or less alcohol by volume, or wine if administered for sacramental purposes within a religious context.	Kansas's alcohol laws are among the strictest in the United States. Kansas prohibited all alcohol from 1881 to 1948, and continued to prohibit on-premises sales of alcohol from 1949 to 1987. Sunday sales only have been allowed since 2005. Today, 3 counties still do not permit the on-premises sale of alcohol. 63 counties require a business to receive at least 30% of revenue from food sales to allow on-premises sale of alcohol. Only 39 counties allow general on-premises sales. Not all communities which allow off-premises sales allow sales on Sunday. There are four towns where liquor stores are not allowed. Off premise sales are prohibited on Christmas, Easter and Thanksgiving. Beer containing no more than 6.0% alcohol by volume may be sold in grocery and convenience stores. Prior to April 1, 2019, the only alcoholic beverage which grocery stores and gas stations were allowed to sell was beer with no more than 3.2% alcohol by weight. Other liquor sales only are allowed at state-licensed retail liquor stores. Kansas has comprehensive open container laws for public places and vehicles, public intoxication laws, and requirements for prospective on-premises or off-premises licensees. Liquor stores can now be open at 9am on Sunday where Sunday Sales are allowed and cocktails to go are now permanently legal
Kentucky	No			6 a.m. to 4 a.m. on Monday through Saturday	1 p.m. to 4 a.m. on Sundays	Yes	No		21		Local ordinance may vote to permit Sunday sales at restaurants. Sales 2–4 a.m. only in Louisville. As of 2005 Sunday sales were allowed per state law, but may still be prohibited in some areas by local ordinance (as of early 2006, such a situation existed with smaller cities within Louisville Metro, though these cities have since changed local ordinances). Alcohol sale restriction and wet/dry (both by drink and package) allowed by both county and city local option. Approximately 39 counties in the state (mostly eastern and southern counties) are dry, all alcohol sale and possession prohibited; 22 "moist" counties (with "wet" cities allowing package liquor sales in counties otherwise dry); 29 counties that are otherwise dry but have communities with local option that allow sales of liquor by the drink or under special exemptions allowing sales at wineries. Majority of wet counties are around major metropolitan areas (Louisville, Lexington, Covington, Bowling Green). Note: Beginning in 2013 Liquor by the drink and beer by the drink are available on Sundays in Louisville, KY beginning at 10:00 am. Bowling Green, KY recently began allowing Sunday sales in December 2013 for carry-out beer, wine, and liquor. Prohibition on liquor sales on Election Day was repealed effective June 24, 2013. Kentucky was one of only two states to still have Election Day prohibition, the other being South Carolina.
Louisiana	No			No state imposed restrictions on on-premises hours. 24 hour bars are common in the New Orleans metro area. 24 hour bars also exist in the Lake Charles metro area (Calcasieu Parish) and in Cameron Parish, however those in the city limits of Lake Charles must close on Sundays. Shreveport's closing time for bars is 6am downtown and 4am elsewhere. Most municipalities and parishes (including Baton Rouge and East Baton Rouge Parish) require on-premises service to stop at 3:00 am or earlier.	No statewide restrictions on hours of package sales.	Yes			21	Exceptions to state law include: For an established religious purpose; When a person under twenty-one years of age is accompanied by a parent, spouse, or legal guardian twenty-one years of age or older; For medical purposes when purchased as an over the counter medication, or when prescribed or administered by a licensed physician, pharmacist, dentist, nurse, hospital, or medical institution; In a private residence, which shall include a residential dwelling and up to twenty contiguous acres, on which the dwelling is located, owned by the same person who owns the dwelling; The sale, handling, transport, or service in dispensing of any alcoholic beverage pursuant to lawful ownership of an establishment or to lawful employment of a person under twenty-one years of age by a duly licensed manufacturer, wholesaler, or retailer of beverage alcohol.	Packaged alcoholic beverages of any strength may be sold in supermarkets, drug stores, gas stations, and convenience stores. Local municipalities may not restrict this. As a result, dedicated "liquor stores" are mostly specialty stores in larger cities, and some supermarkets have large selections of liquors and wines, and compete on the basis of liquor prices and selection. Alcohol can be consumed in the streets of New Orleans as long as it is in an "unbreakable container" (no glass) and may be taken from club to club if both establishments allow it. Otherwise, it depends on the locality. Most parishes other than Orleans and Lafayette Parishes do not permit alcoholic beverages served on premises to be carried out. However, many parishes and municipalities permit consumption of packaged beverages (for example, cans of beer) on the street. Glass bottles on the streets are prohibited. One can enter most bars at 18 years of age but must be 21 years old to purchase or consume alcohol. Also, it is legal in the state of Louisiana for a legal parent or guardian to purchase alcoholic beverages for their underaged child. There are numerous dry towns in Louisiana with the bulk of them in the northern half of the state, and until 2020, West Carroll Parish was the last completely dry Parish in Louisiana. Drive-thru frozen daiquiri stands are legal and common, but the police can arrest you for driving with an open container, if you have put the straw in the cup
Maine	No		Yes	5 a.m. to 1 a.m. (Mon–Sun)		Yes			21	21 Minors may consume alcohol at home in the presence of their parent, guardian, or custodian.	ABV > Alcohol may not be purchased after 1 a.m. any day of the week, may not be purchased prior to 5 a.m. Bars and restaurants may serve until 1:15 a.m. On New Year's Day alcohol may be sold one hour later in all establishments. Wholesaling through state-licensed monopoly. Municipalities may prohibit the sale of alcohol by referendum; 56 towns have done so.
Maryland	No, except Montgomery County			Variable by locality	Variable by locality	No, with exceptions for stores grandfathered in prior to the law.			21	?	Baltimore County prohibits the sale on Sunday in some areas. In the counties of Montgomery, Somerset, Wicomico, and Worcester sale of alcoholic beverages are controlled directly by the county Liquor Control Boards, there are exceptions in Montgomery where some liquors are still sold in grocery store due to being grandfathered before the change of the law. Garrett County prohibits the sale on Sunday except in some areas. There are no dry counties, but some individual voting districts within counties restrict or prohibit alcohol on a local-option basis.
Massachusetts	No			8:00 a.m. – 2:00 a.m. by state law, although individual cities and towns may prohibit sales before 11:00 a.m. and after 11:00 p.m. Not before 11:00 a.m. on Sunday.	8:00 a.m. – 11:00 p.m., or 8:00 a.m. – 11:30 p.m. on the day before a holiday. Not before 10:00 am on Sunday.	Yes.			21	21	As of January 2020, no individual, partnership, or corporation may have more than nine off-premises licences in the state, nor more than two in any city, nor more than one in any town. No individual, partnership, or corporation not resident or headquartered in Massachusetts may apply for a license, although one may devolve thereupon. As of January 8th, 2025, a Massachusetts driver's license, out of state driver's license, Massachusetts Liquor ID card, RMV-issued Massachusetts non-driver ID card, passport (issued by the US or a US-recognized foreign entity), US-issued Passport Card, US-issued Global Entry Card, and military identification card are the only acceptable proofs of age under state law. Until a 2024 change in law, out of state driver's licenses did not grant the establishment legal protection if accepted as proof of age and many establishments did not accept out of state licenses for this reason. On-premises regulations: No discounts at specific times (i.e. no "Happy Hour" discounts) or for specific individuals, no fixed-price open bar or all-you-can-drink (except at private functions), no more than two drinks per individual at any one time, no pitchers for fewer than two people, no drinking contests, no drinks as prizes, no free drinks. Off-premises sale of alcohol is prohibited on the last Monday in May (Memorial Day), Thanksgiving Day, Christmas Day, and the day after Christmas if Christmas falls on a Sunday. Sale of alcohol is prohibited during polling hours on election days (subject to local exceptions). "Malt beverages" defined as having not more than 12% alcohol by weight.

=== Michigan–New Mexico ===
State federal district or territory	Alcoholic beverage control state			Alcohol sale hours		Grocery store sales			Age		Notes
State federal district or territory	Beer	Wine	Distilled spirits	On-premises	Off-premises	Beer	Wine	Distilled Spirits	Purchasing	Consumption	Notes
Michigan	No		Yes	7 a.m. – 2 a.m. (Mon.–Sat.) noon-2 a.m. (Sunday)*sales may begin at 7 a.m. with special license extension	7 a.m.-2 a.m. (Mon-Sat) noon-2 a.m. (Sunday)*sales may begin at 7 a.m. with special license extension,	Yes			21	21	The Michigan Liquor Control Commission allows the sale of alcoholic beverages until 11:59 p.m. on December 24 and after 12:00 p.m. on December 25. On-premises sales are permitted on January 1 until 4:00 a.m. Local or county ordinance may restrict Sunday or Sunday morning sales. State does not operate retail outlets; maintains a monopoly over wholesaling of distilled spirits only. State owns liquor until purchased and distributor acts as a delivery service for cases sold to retailers.
Minnesota	No, however numerous towns and cities have a monopoly on retail sales			8 a.m. – 2 a.m. seven days	8:00 a.m.-10:00 p.m. (Mon–Sat); 11:00 a.m.-6:00 p.m. (Sun)	3.2% Only	No		21	?	Local or County ordinance prevails for hours of operation for off-sale licenses. Growler sales allowed until 10 p.m. 7 days a week. Certain municipalities may establish municipal liquor stores; they are permitted, but not required, to exclude privately owned stores. Off-premises sales on Sundays became legal on July 1, 2017.
Mississippi	No		Yes	Local authorities fix hours of alcohol sale	Liquor Stores 10:00 a.m.-10:00 p.m. (Mon–Sat) Convenience/Grocery stores(Beer only): 24/7 unless restricted by local ordinance	Yes	No		21	?	ABW > 5% wine and sparkling wine sold in state-contracted stores which are open from 10:00 am until 10:00 pm (Closed Sundays) statewide. Beer and light wine (ABW < 5%, ABV < ~6.3%) sold in convenience stores/supermarkets. Beer and light wine (ABW < 5%) may be consumed by persons age 18–20 with parental supervision. Governor Phil Bryant signed a bill permitting beer with 8% ABW/10% ABV on April 9, 2012. The bill went into effect on July 1, 2012. No sales on Christmas Day. No state open container laws. Complimentary alcohol all day and night in coastal casinos. In most counties, alcohol cannot be sold on Sundays. There are many dry counties in which it is illegal to possess alcoholic beverages, though some cities within dry counties have voted in beer sales.
Missouri	No			Most establishments: (Sun-Sat) 6:00 am – 1:30 am Special licenses in Kansas City, St. Louis and Lake of the Ozarks: (Sun-Sat) 6:00 am – 3:00 am	(Sun-Sat) 6:00 am – 1:30 am Sales permitted until 3:00 am in those Kansas City and St. Louis bars grandfathered into the ability to double as liquor stores.	Yes			21	Parents and guardians may furnish alcohol to their children.	One of the most alcohol-permissive states, perhaps only behind Nevada and Louisiana: No open container law.; No state public intoxication law.; Liquor control law covers all beverages containing more than 0.5% alcohol, without further particularities based on percentage.; Cities and counties are prohibited from banning off-premises alcohol sales.; No dry jurisdictions.; State preemption of local alcohol laws which do not follow state law.; Certain bars in Kansas City and St. Louis grandfathered into the ability to double as liquor stores.; Special licenses available for bars and nightclubs which allow selling alcohol until 3:00 am in Kansas City, Jackson County, North Kansas City, St. Louis, St. Louis County, and Lake of the Ozarks.; Grocery stores, drug stores, and even gas stations may sell liquor without limitation other than hours.; Patrons allowed to take open containers out of bars in Kansas City's Power & Light District.; Missourians over 21 may manufacture up to 100 gallons of any liquor per year for personal use, without any further state limitation, state taxation, or state license. (Obtaining a permit from the Federal Alcohol and Tobacco Tax and Trade Bureau and meeting other requirements under federal law probably still is required for private citizens to manufacture distilled alcohol - but not wine or beer - for personal use.); Missouri law recognizes two types of alcoholic beverage: liquor, which is any beverage containing more than 0.5% alcohol except "non-intoxicating beer"; and "non-intoxicating beer", which is beer containing between 0.5% and 3.2% alcohol. Liquor laws apply to all liquor, and special laws apply to "non-intoxicating beer". Restaurants may sell bulk quantities of pre-mixed cocktails, such as margaritas, provided that they are sold in sealed containers. Originally introduced during the COVID pandemic, this was permanently permitted beginning August 28, 2021.
Montana	No		Yes	Closing 2 am	No alcohol sales between 2 am and 8 am	Yes		No	21	Minors can consume alcohol purchased by a parent or guardian in a private location.	ABV > 16% wine sold in state-contracted stores, ABV < 16% may be sold in grocery stores. Some local ordinances restrict alcohol sales on Sundays. State run liquor stores are closed on Sundays.
Nebraska	No			6 a.m. – 1 a.m. Legislation passed in 2010 allows for municipalities to extend on-premises sales to 2 a.m. with two-thirds approval of city or county councils.		Yes			21	21(except in a parent or guardian's home with their permission)	No on- or off-premises sales of spirits before noon on Sundays. All beer, wine, and champagne can be sold starting at 6 a.m.
Nevada	No			24 hours		Yes			21	Varies by county. In Clark County, consumption of alcoholic beverages are usually permitted in the Las Vegas Strip, and in other unincorporated areas. The only restriction is that the container must not be made of glass. It is prohibited to consume alcoholic beverages near schools, churches, and hospitals within 1,000 feet. In addition, individuals under the age of 21 are prohibited to consume alcohol, but they can possess it under parental consent. On the other hand, underaged individuals in Washoe County are prohibited from consuming or purchasing alcoholic beverages from licensed establishments.	There are few restrictions on the sale and consumption of alcohol in Nevada except for age. The maximum abv of alcohol sold is 80%. State law also renders public intoxication legal, and explicitly prohibits any local or state law from making it a public offence. Alcohol purchase is only controlled in Panaca.
New Hampshire	No		Yes	6 a.m. – 1 a.m.	6 a.m. – 11:45 p.m.	Yes		No	21		Liquor sold in state-run stores, many found at highway rest areas. 14% ABV cap on beer. State is wholesaler of wine. State taxes beer $0.30/gal at the wholesale level.
New Jersey	No			Each municipality can control hours by local ordinance. Most municipalities have a last call of 2 or 3 a.m. Atlantic City, Brigantine, Absecon, Elwood, Pomona, Smithville, Galloway, and Mullica (All in Atlantic County) serve 24 hours. There are some dry towns in the southern part of the state, including Ocean City.	9 a.m.–10 p.m. for liquor. Beer and wine can be sold at any time on-premise sales are permitted in that municipality. This causes most liquor stores to close at 10 pm, however some will stay open an hour later selling only beer and wine. Cities of the first class (e.g. Jersey City and Newark) are exempt from this law and may set their own hours for liquor sales.	Rarely			21	21 (unless provided by parent or guardian in private)	Some dry communities in historically Methodist and Quaker communities in the southern part of the state. Though there is not a ban on selling alcoholic beverages at grocery stores, New Jersey limits each chain to two licenses, so with only a few exceptions, most supermarkets/convenience stores/gas stations/pharmacies do not sell alcoholic beverages. In addition, liquor sales are only permitted in a separate department or attached sister store. The ability of a "liquor store" to sell other items, such as convenience store fare, is determined by municipality. Many towns permit beer/wine/liquor stores to sell non-alcohol items including convenience store items at the same register. In such towns, grocery stores including chains may theoretically apply for and receive a liquor license if the company does not already have two in the state. Bars are allowed to off-sale packaged goods. With the exception of Jersey City and Newark, all municipalities MUST allow off-sales of beer and wine at any time on-sales are permitted. However, since alcoholic beverages are generally only found in package stores, this right is rarely exercised. Alcoholic beverages by the drink as well as off-sales of beer and wine are permitted 24 hours a day in Atlantic City and Brigantine.
New Mexico	No			7 a.m. – 2 a.m.	7 a.m. – midnight	Yes			21		New Mexico issues two types of license for consumption on-premises: a full dispenser license allowing sale of all types of alcohol, or a restaurant license permitting sale of beer and wine only. An additional Sunday permit is available which allows sale (on or off premises) on Sundays. Exceptions are the prohibition of alcohol sale on Christmas, regardless of the day it falls on, and a Sunday permit allowing of sale (on or off premises) until 2:00 a.m. January 1, if December 31 falls on a Sunday. Sunday permits are only available where approved by voters within a local option district. Selling, serving and giving alcohol to a minor is a class 4 felony punishable by up to 18 months in prison, except when "a parent, legal guardian or adult spouse of a minor serves alcoholic beverages to that minor on real property, other than licensed premises, under the control of the parent, legal guardian or adult spouse", or for religious purposes.

=== New York–South Dakota ===
State federal district or territory	Alcoholic beverage control state			Alcohol sale hours		Grocery store sales			Age		Notes
State federal district or territory	Beer	Wine	Distilled spirits	On-premises	Off-premises	Beer	Wine	Distilled Spirits	Purchasing	Consumption	Notes
New York	No			8 a.m. – 4 a.m. (Mon – Sat); Noon – 4 a.m. (Sun); Some counties have more restrictive hours.	Beer: 24 hours Wine & spirits: 8 a.m. – midnight (Mon–Sat); Noon – 9 p.m. (Sun).	Yes	No		21		Off-premises sale of wine and spirits is only at liquor stores, and beer is not sold at liquor stores; it must be sold at supermarkets and convenience stores. Exchanges for returned items are permitted (at store owners' discretion). Some counties may retain the Sunday morning beer prohibition which the state discontinued as of July 30, 2006. There are twelve dry towns, mostly in the western region of the state. Many counties have more restrictive off-premises hours, such as bans on beer sales overnight (hours vary). All liquor stores must be owned by a single owner, who owns that store and lives within a certain distance of it—effectively banning chain liquor stores from the state. New York City law does not allow open containers of alcohol in public. Distilled spirits may not be sold within 200 feet of a school, church, synagogue or other place of worship.
North Carolina	No		Yes	7 a.m. – 2 a.m. (Mon – Sat); 10 a.m. – 2 a.m. (Sun)	Beer and wine: 7 a.m. – 2 a.m. (Mon – Sat); 10 a.m. – 2 a.m. (Sun); Liquor: 9 a.m. – 9 p.m. (Mon – Sat)	Yes		No	21		15% ABV cap on beer, 16% cap on unfortified wine, 24% cap on fortified wine. No "happy hour", "discount during games", "buy one get one free", or "ladies night" style specials allowed; only daily drink specials permitted. Buckets of beer or pitchers of beer/cocktails must be sold to a group of two or more people; however, carafes or bottles of wine may be sold to an individual patron. Prix-fixe packages where alcohol is included with food limited to sales on New Year's, Valentine's Day, and Mother's Day/Father's Day.
North Dakota	No			8 a.m. – 2 a.m.	8 a.m. – 2 a.m.	Yes, however it needs to be separated by a wall from the rest of the store			21		No off-sale on Thanksgiving Day after 2 a.m. No Christmas Day on-sale, nor sales on Christmas Eve after 6 p.m.
Ohio	No		Yes	5:30 a.m. – 2:30 a.m.	5:30 a.m. – 1 a.m.	Yes, under 21% ABV			21	21 or older, unrestricted under supervision of individual's parent or legal guardian or legal age spouse	12% ABV cap on beer was removed on May 31, 2016. 21% ABV cap on wine. Some counties have more restrictive off-premises hours. The Division of Liquor Control does not operate retail outlets; it appoints private businesses to act as its agents and sell its products in exchange for a commission. Normal proof spirits (>21% ABV) are sold only in a limited number of agent stores. Many retail outlets sell diluted spirits (diluted by water to 21% ABV) under a more readily obtained permit. No intoxicating liquor shall be handled by any person under twenty-one years of age, except that a person eighteen years of age or older employed by a permit holder may handle or sell beer or intoxicating liquor in sealed containers in connection with wholesale or retail sales, and any person nineteen years of age or older employed by a permit holder may handle intoxicating liquor in open containers when acting in the capacity of a server in a hotel, restaurant, club, or night club. . Beverages with less than 0.5% ABV can be sold/given to people under the age of eighteen if given by a physician in the regular line of his practice or given for established religious purposes, or the underage person is accompanied by a parent, spouse who is not an underage person, or legal guardian.
Oklahoma	No			7 a.m. – 2 a.m.	Liquor stores: 8 a.m. – midnight (Mon – Sat) Sunday sales vary by county. Grocery stores: 6 a.m. - 2 a.m. seven days a week including holidays.	Yes		No	21	Consumption by those under 21 is not prohibited in private settings, where supervised by a parent or guardian.	Beer (up to 15% ABV) and wine (up to 15% ABV) can be sold in grocery and convenience stores, and can be sold refrigerated. Distilled spirits are only available in package liquor stores. State law prohibits public intoxication, many counties and cities also prohibit public intoxication.
Oregon	No		Yes	7 a.m. – 2:30 a.m.	7 a.m. – 2:30 a.m.	Yes		No	21		Liquor, all of which is state-owned prior to sale to consumers, is sold in private liquor stores. These stores are approved by Oregon's Liquor Commissioners to act as sales agents on the state's behalf.
Pennsylvania	No	Yes		Restaurants, and bars: 7 a.m. – 2 a.m. (Mon – Sat); 11 a.m. - 2 a.m. (Sun); Clubs: 7 a.m. – 3 a.m.	Beverage Centers and State Run Stores: 9 a.m. – 10 p.m. (Mon – Sat); Noon – 5 p.m. . (Sun) Grocery Stores: 7 a.m. - 10 p.m. (Mon–Sat) 9 a.m. - 10 p.m. (Sun)	Yes*		No	21		Spirits can only be sold at state-operated stores. All persons must be at least 21 years of age to enter a state-operated liquor store alone. Beer is not sold at state-operated liquor stores. Beer (but not wine) to go can be purchased at beverage outlets in any quantity. Prior to 2015 beverage centers could only sell 24 pack cases or greater. The rules were relaxed to permit sales of beer in any quantity in 2016. *Beer and wine to go can be purchased in restaurants and grocery stores (at a separate point of purchase for alcohol and prepared foods sales in grocery stores) (six and 12 packs/192oz max. purchase (two six packs)) with Liquor Control Board–issued licenses. Sunday sales were prohibited in LCB stores until 2003 (selected locations) and beverage outlets (owner's option) until 2005. Special permits may be purchased for certain organizations for fundraisers once per calendar year, and are valid for a total of six days under the same rules governing restaurants. Grain alcohol prohibited as a beverage.
Rhode Island	No			9 am – 1 a.m. (Mon – Sat); Noon – 1 a.m. (Sun)	9 a.m. – 10 p.m. (Mon – Sat); 10 a.m. – 6 p.m. (Sun)	No			21	21	All alcohol may be sold only in liquor stores. Bars may stay open until 2 a.m. in Providence only on Friday and Saturday nights and nights before a state-recognized holiday.
South Carolina	No			Liquor: 10 am - 2 am. Beer and Wine: Local Option.	Beer and low-alcohol wine: 24 hours Liquor: 9 a.m. – 7 p.m. (Mon – Sat.)	Yes		No	21		14% ABW (17.5% ABV) cap on beer Wine > 16% ABV sold in liquor stores No hard liquor sales after 7 p.m. and none on Sundays. No off-premises alcohol sales after midnight Saturday until 7 a.m. Monday, except in Aiken, Greenville, Pendleton, Spartanburg, Horry County, Colleton County, Richland County, Charleston County/city, Beaufort County, York County, and Newberry County.
South Dakota	No			7 a.m. – 2 a.m.	7 a.m. – 2 a.m.	Yes			21		14% ABV cap on beer

=== Tennessee–Wyoming, Puerto Rico ===
State federal district or territory	Alcoholic beverage control state			Alcohol sale hours		Grocery store sales			Age		Notes
State federal district or territory	Beer	Wine	Distilled spirits	On-premises	Off-premises	Beer	Wine	Distilled Spirits	Purchasing	Consumption	Notes
Tennessee	No			Mon-Sat: 8 a.m. to 3 a.m.; Sun: Noon to 3 a.m. Hours of alcohol sale can be modified by local jurisdictions if approved by the alcohol control commission.	Beer: By municipality. Wine & Spirits: 8 a.m. to 11 p.m. Mon–Sat, 10 a.m. to 11 p.m. Sun	Yes		No	21		Wine may be sold in grocery stores. Liquor stores may remain open on Sundays, and liquor is permitted to be sold from retail stores for off-premises consumption. There are no liquor sales in OFF Premise Grocery Stores as of 8/2018. Retail package stores must be closed for business on Christmas, Thanksgiving Day, and Easter. Beer above 8% ABW /10.1% ABV must be sold in liquor stores. Open container law only applies to drivers, not passengers. It is legal to carry alcohol in a non-glass container on the Beale Street stretch in Memphis. While most clubs allow drinks to be carried outside, many do not allow drinks from outside.
Texas	No			Monday–Friday: 7 am–midnight Saturday: 7 am – 1 am Sunday: Noon to 12 midnight. Some cities/counties permit sale until 2 am (with license). Hotel bars: 24/7	Beer/Non-hard liquor: 7 a.m. to midnight (Mon.–Fri.); 7 a.m. to 1:00 a.m. (Sat.); 10 a.m. to midnight (Sun); Hard Liquor: 10 a.m. to 9 p.m. (Mon.–Sat.)	Yes		No	21	Texas law permits consumption by minors (any age under 21) if in the "visible presence" of a parent, guardian or adult spouse. (Section 106.04)	No alcohol cap but ABV > 15.5% requires additional license, so many places are beer/wine only. Wet/dry issues determined by city/county election. Liquor stores statewide closed all day Sunday and on specified holidays (on those holidays which fall on a Sunday, the stores must be closed the following Monday). An alcoholic beverage served (on-premises) to a customer between 10 a.m. and noon on Sunday may only be provided during the service of food to the customer. Five Texas counties are completely dry. In many counties, public intoxication laws are vigorously upheld. Possession by minors is permitted as part of employment or education, or in the visible presence of an adult parent, guardian or spouse, or supervision of a commissioned peace officer. (Section 106.05) There are also exemptions for minors requesting or receiving medical attention. Sunday beer and wine sales will be allowed at 10 a.m. starting September 1, 2021 along with no closing time for hotel bars that serve alcohol to registered guests.
Utah	Yes			Restaurants: Noon to midnight for liquor, 10:00 a.m. to 1:00 a.m. for beer. Bars may serve liquor from 10:00 a.m. to 1:00 a.m.	Varies by state liquor store hours	4% only	No		21		ABV > 5.0+% sold in state-controlled stores only. 4.0% ABW (5.0% ABV) beer may be sold at grocery stores and convenience stores. State-controlled stores close on Sundays and cease operations no later than 10 p.m. the rest of the week. Restaurants must buy from the state-controlled store (no delivery) at retail prices. No alcohol is served in restaurants without purchase of food. Sales of kegs prohibited. Happy hours or discounted alcoholic drinks prohibited. Importation of alcohol into the state by private individuals generally prohibited.
Vermont	No		Yes	8 a.m. – 2 a.m.	6 a.m. – midnight	Yes		No	21		ABV > 16% beer and ABV > 16% wine are only available through state liquor stores (most of which are integrated within grocery and beverage stores). A 2008 bill allows the sale of beer in grocery and convenience stores up to ABV 16%.
Virginia	No		Yes	6 a.m. – 2 a.m. No restrictions at any time for club licensees.	6 a.m. – 11:59 p.m. except local blue law.	Yes		No	21	21	Licensed supermarkets, convenience stores, and gas stations may sell beer and wine. They are also now selling some "ready to drink" cocktails with spirits. Off-premises sales no later than 12 midnight. Liquor stores are owned and operated by the Commonwealth and are generally open 10 am – 9 pm Monday–Saturday and 10 am – 6 pm on Sunday.
Washington	No			6 a.m. – 2 a.m. (A local government subdivision may establish later opening hours or earlier closing hours.)		Yes			21		Beer and wine are available in specialty stores, grocery stores, convenience stores, department stores, taverns, and other locations licensed by the Washington State Liquor and Cannabis Board. Spirits are available in stores greater than 10,000 sq ft (grocery stores, big box liquor chains). There are two exceptions to the 10,000-sq-ft rule: 1) Former State and Contract Liquor Stores that reopened under private ownership may also sell spirits provided they have been issued a new license from the state. 2) Cities, mostly in rural areas, that do not have a store that meets the minimum floor space may be allowed to sell spirits if the Liquor Control Board deems that there are no sufficient establishments within the trade area.
West Virginia	No		Yes	Taverns, etc., except Private Clubs(Beer/Wine): 6 am – 2 am Private Clubs(Beer, Wine, and Liquor): 6 am – 3 am	Beer and Wine: 6 am – 2 am Liquor stores: 6 am-Midnight, no sales on Christmas Day and Easter Sunday	Yes			21		12% ABV Cap on Beer. 75% ABV spirits Permitted. Liquor, wine and beer products that are not already in closed packaging must be bagged before exiting retail locations. State no longer operates retail stores (formerly State ABC Stores); Number of privately owned stores restricted according to county or city population. All stores are state contracted; Bars and clubs must purchase liquor from state contracted private stores in person. State retains monopoly over wholesaling of distilled spirits only.
Wisconsin	No			6 a.m. – 2 a.m. Sunday–Thursday, 2:30 a.m. Friday–Saturday, no closing time on New Year's Day.	6 a.m. – midnight for beer (some counties and municipalities only allow sales until 9 p.m. for beer), 6 a.m. – 9 p.m. for liquor and wine		By local ordinance		21	Wisconsin permits the consumption of alcohol by minors, provided they are being supervised by parents/guardians/spouses.	Most municipalities have a uniform 9 p.m. restriction on all alcohol sales. Notable exceptions: Kenosha, Green Bay, La Crosse, Maple Bluff, Baraboo. Supermarkets, liquor stores, and gas stations may sell liquor, wine, and beer. Law changed effective December 7, 2011 to allow all liquor sales to begin at 6 a.m.
Wyoming	No	Yes		6:00 a.m. – 2:00 a.m.		Yes			21		Clubs holding liquor licenses may be exempt from the hours of operation here specified by local ordinance or regulation of the appropriate licensing authority, but it does not seem to happen in practice
Puerto Rico	No			No territory-wide mandated last call	No territory-wide mandated hours of operation for liquor stores, but sales prohibited on Election Day and during hurricane emergencies; some municipalities prohibit sales after midnight weekdays or 2:00 weekends.	Beer, wine and spirits available for sale in supermarkets, convenience stores and drug stores as well as liquor stores.			18		Minimum drinking age is 18. Drinking on the street is illegal in San Juan (except in designated areas during selected street festivals) but not in all cities.

== See also ==
- Alcohol consumption by youth in the United States
- Alcohol exclusion laws
- Blue laws in the United States
- Drunk driving in the United States
- Dry county
- Granholm v. Heald
- Last call
- Legal drinking age controversy in the United States
- Liquor store
- List of dry communities by U.S. state
- Shoulder tap (alcohol)
- United States open container laws
- Wine shipping laws in the United States
- U.S. history of alcohol minimum purchase age by state
