= Utah Department of Alcoholic Beverage Services =

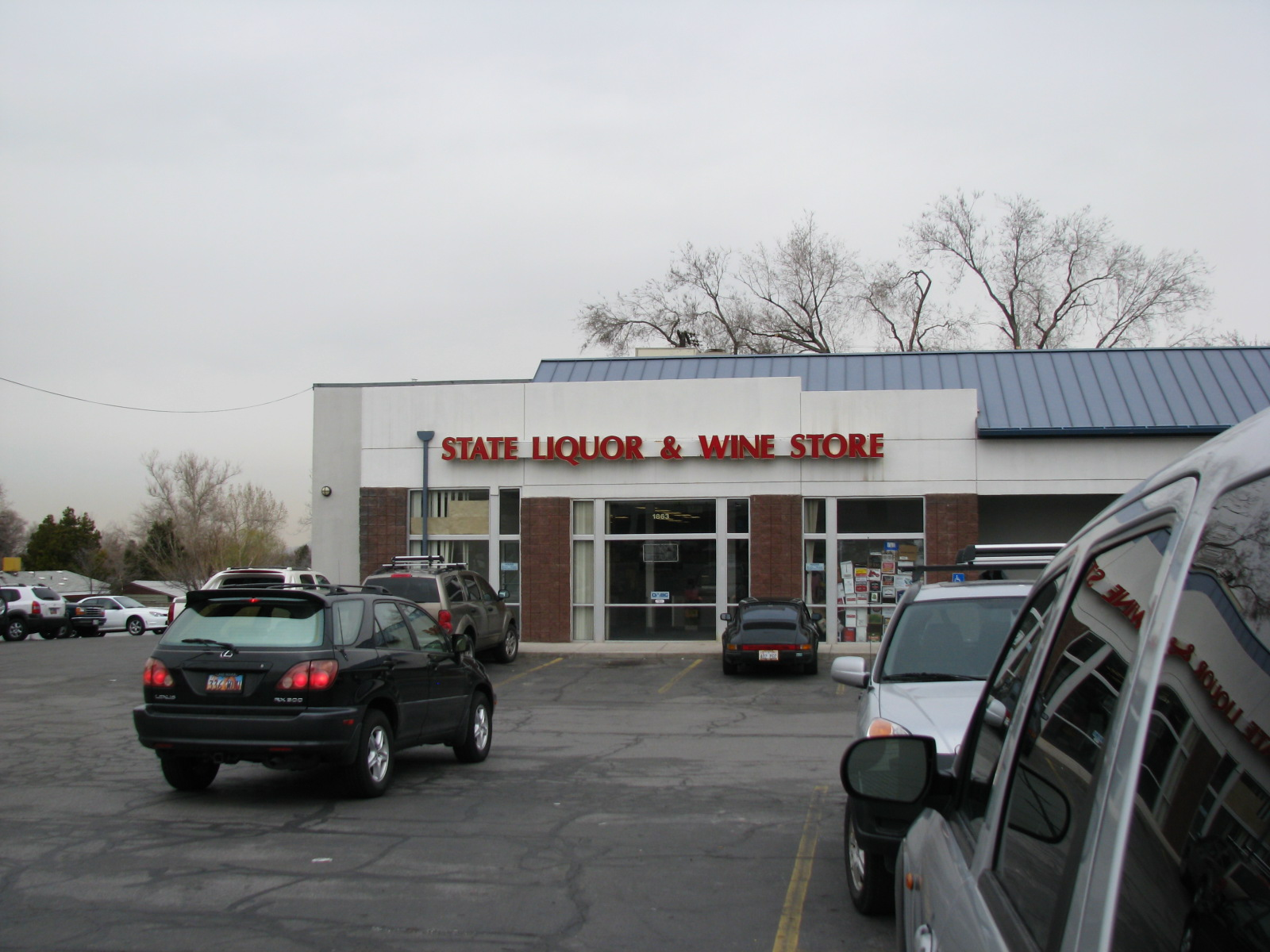
State run liquor store in Cottonwood Heights, Utah. Due to the interpretation of Utah's liquor law, the "closed" sign is off, indicating the store is open for business.

The Utah Department of Alcoholic Beverage Services (UDABS) is a state government agency of the U.S. state of Utah. It has its headquarters in Salt Lake City.

The department was created by statute in 1935 by the Utah State Legislature, and it was granted the authority to conduct, license and regulate the sale of alcoholic beverages within the state.

Utah is one of 18 U.S. jurisdictions (17 alcoholic beverage control states plus Maryland's Montgomery County) that maintain a monopoly on alcoholic beverage sales.

According to the department, "The purpose of control is to make liquor available to those adults who choose to drink responsibly - but not to promote the sale of liquor. By keeping liquor out of the private marketplace, no economic incentives are created to maximize sales, open more liquor stores or sell to underage persons. Instead, all policy incentives to promote moderation and to enforce existing liquor laws is [sic] enhanced."

== See also ==
- Alcohol laws of Utah
