= Alcohol laws of Maryland =

Alcohol laws of Maryland vary considerably by county, due to the wide latitude of home rule granted to Maryland counties.

== State laws ==
=== Underage possession, consumption, and furnishing ===
It is illegal under state law for a person under the age of 21 to possess or consume an alcoholic beverage.

It is illegal to purchase alcohol for someone under age 21 so that the underage person may drink it.

It is illegal for an adult to knowingly and willfully allow an individual under age 21 to possess or drink an alcoholic beverage at a home where the adult lives, rents, or owns. There are a few exceptions:

- It is legal if the adult and underage person are members of the same immediate family and the alcoholic beverage is provided and is consumed in the adult's home or the land immediately surrounding the home.
- It is legal if the adult and the underage person are participants in a religious ceremony.
- It is legal if the adult is an instructor teaching a course or program in wine-making, fermenting, brewing, or hospitality and tourism at a post-secondary educational institution; the adult remains in control of the alcoholic beverage; the underage person is enrolled in the class; the underage person is at least age 18; and the underage person tastes and then spits out the alcoholic beverage.

It is a separate offense for an underage person to misrepresent age for the purpose of obtaining alcohol. It is also a separate offence for an underage person to possess any sort of card or document that falsely identifies the underage person's age. An underage person who illegally possesses alcohol or false identification is subject to a citation rather than arrest, and the event is considered a civil offense, meaning that it does not count as a criminal conviction and cannot result in imprisonment in and of itself.

=== Employment ===
A person must be at least 21 years old to be employed to serve alcoholic beverages or sell alcoholic beverages, although some counties have different laws.

A person must be at least 18 years old to work in another capacity at an establishment that serves alcohol. If the business serves alcohol and food service is not the primary focus of the business, then the minimum age to work there is 21.

=== Open containers ===
State law prohibits open containers with any amount of alcohol within the passenger area of a motor vehicle. Passengers of a vehicle are similarly prohibited from consuming alcohol in the passenger area, but the law provides exceptions for non-drivers in the back of hired vehicles such as taxis, limousines, and buses, as well as in the living areas of motor homes. The driver is also shielded from prosecution if it is based solely on another occupant of the vehicle having an open container.

The law defines an open container to be a container that is open, or whose seal is broken, or that has had some of its contents removed.

The law defines the passenger area as an area that "is designed to seat the driver and any passenger of a motor vehicle while the motor vehicle is in operation; or is readily accessible to the driver or a passenger of a motor vehicle while in their seating positions." The law states that certain areas are not part of the passenger area, such as "a locked glove compartment; the trunk of a motor vehicle; or if a motor vehicle is not equipped with a trunk, the area behind the rearmost upright seat or an area that is not normally occupied by the driver or a passenger of the motor vehicle."

Like underage possession above, violation of the open container law is a civil offense.

=== Taxation ===
In July 2011, Maryland's taxation of alcohol was increased for the first time since the 1970s, from 6 percent to 9 percent. The tax is applied at the consumer level, appearing as a line-item on the customer's receipt.

== County laws ==
County	Alcoholic beverage control county			Alcohol sale hours		Grocery Store Sales		
County	Beer	Wine	Spirits	On-premises	Off-premises	Beer	Wine	Spirits
Allegany County	No			24hrs at Rocky Gap Casino Only (Note: Restaurants may sell alcoholic beverages 1 p.m. – 2 a.m. on Sunday.)	7 a.m. – 2 a.m., Monday – Saturday. 11 a.m. – 12 a.m. Sunday.	No		
Anne Arundel County	No			6 a.m. - 2 a.m.		No		
Baltimore City	No			6 a.m. – 2 a.m. (Note: 6 a.m. – 1 a.m. for 6-day tavern licenses.) (Note: No Sunday sales, except for those Sundays between Thanksgiving and New Years upon issuance of special license.)	6 a.m. – 12 a.m. (Monday – Saturday) (Note: Class BD-7 licensees may sell alcohol for off-site consumption 6 a.m. – 2 a.m.) (Note: No Sunday sales, except for those Sundays between Thanksgiving and New Years upon issuance of special license.)	No		
Baltimore County	No			6 a.m. – 2 a.m. (Note: 6 a.m. – 1 a.m. (for Class D beer/wine licenses).)	6 a.m. – 12 a.m. Monday – Saturday. (Note: No off-premises Sunday sales, except for the Sunday preceding Christmas Day and the Sunday preceding New Year's Eve, between 7 a.m. – 9 p.m.)	No		
Calvert County	No			Follows state law.		No		
Caroline County	No			Taverns selling beer and/or wine: 6 a.m. – 12 a.m. All other establishments, including taverns selling beer, wine, and liquor: 6 a.m. – 2 a.m.		Yes		
Carroll County	No			8 a.m. – 2 a.m. Monday – Saturday. 8 a.m. – 1 a.m. Sunday.	8 a.m. – 11 p.m. Monday – Saturday; 11 a.m. – 11 p.m. Sunday. (Note: No retail off-premises store may be larger than 10,000 square feet (930 m^{2}).)	No		
Cecil County	No			6 a.m. – 2 a.m. Monday – Saturday. 10 a.m. – 11 p.m. Sunday. (Note: One liquor license per store/corporation.)	6 a.m. – 2 a.m. Monday – Saturday. 8 a.m. – 11 p.m. Sunday.	Rarely		
Charles County	No			6 a.m. – 2 a.m. Monday – Saturday. 6 a.m. – 12 a.m. Sunday.		No		
Dorchester County	No			Unknown		No		
Frederick County	No			6 a.m. – 2 a.m. Monday – Saturday. 11 a.m. – 2 a.m. Sunday. (Note: An off-premises license may not be issued to any franchised establishment.)		No		
Garrett County	No			6 a.m. – 2 a.m. Monday – Saturday. 6 a.m. – 12 a.m. Sunday. (Note: Sunday sales are authorized in an electoral district or precinct thereof only if approved by referendum.)		Unknown		
Harford County	No			8 a.m. – 2 a.m.		No		
Howard County	No			6 a.m. – 2 a.m.		No		
Kent County	No			6 a.m. – 2 a.m. 12 a.m. – 4 a.m. on New Years' Day.		Unknown		
Montgomery County	Yes			Restaurants or taverns selling beer and/or wine: 9 a.m. – 2 a.m. Restaurants or taverns selling beer, wine, and liquor: 9 a.m.–2 a.m. Sun–Thu, 9 a.m.–3 a.m. Fri–Sat.	If selling beer and/or wine: 6 a.m.–1 a.m. If selling spirits: 10 a.m.–9 p.m. Mon–Sat, 12 noon–5 p.m. Sun.	No (some grandfathered in) (Note: In Montgomery County, six grocery chains — Giant Food, Safeway, Shoppers Food & Pharmacy, Magruder's, Bestway Supermercado, and 7-Eleven — and one independent grocery store - Snider's Foods - received an exception from the state law that bans grocery stores from selling beer and wine under a grandfather clause. These seven stores are allowed to have one location that sells beer and wine in Montgomery County: Giant's New Hampshire Avenue store in the White Oak neighborhood of Silver Spring, Safeway in Olney, Shoppers in Germantown, Magruder's in Gaithersburg (NOTE: all Maryland Magruder's locations were closed in 2013), Bestway Supermercado in the Long Branch neighborhood of Silver Spring, Snider's Foods in the Woodside neighborhood of Silver Spring, and 7-Eleven's store on Georgia Avenue in Aspen Hill. These licenses can be transferred to any of the chain's other locations in Montgomery County subject to approval by the county Board of License Commissioners.)		
Prince George's County	No			Retail: 6 a.m. – 2 a.m., except Sunday. Bars: 6 a.m. – 2 a.m. (Note: Bars that feature live entertainment may serve alcohol until 3 a.m. Friday and Saturday nights.)		Beer and wine. (Note: Each corporation may sell beer and wine at only one location. The Shoppers in College Park and the Giant in Lanham are two examples.)		
Queen Anne's County	No			Unknown		No		
Saint Mary's County	No			6 a.m. - 2 a.m., including Sundays		All yes		
Somerset County	Yes			Unknown		Unknown		
Talbot County	No			Unknown		Yes		
Washington County	No			Unknown		No		
Wicomico County	Yes			Unknown		Yes		
Worcester County	Yes			Unknown		Yes		

== History ==
Prior to 1973, the minimum age to buy or possess alcoholic beverages was 21 years old. In 1973, the minimum age was decreased to 18 years old in Montgomery County and Prince George's County. On July 1, 1974, the minimum age was decreased to 18 years old for the entire state. In 1982, the minimum age was increased to 21 years old but with a grandfather clause which allowed those who had already turned 18 (born June 30, 1964 or earlier) to consume beer and wine.

== See also ==
- Drug policy of Maryland
- Montgomery County Department of Liquor Control
