= Great Basin Brewing Company =

Coordinates: 39.535009°N 119.754151°W

Great Basin Brewing Co.
- Company type: Private
- Industry: Alcoholic beverage; Restaurant
- Founded: 1993
- Founder: Tom Young; Eric McClary
- Headquarters: Sparks, NV, United States
- Number of locations: 2 brewpubs (2013); 1 bottling facility (2013)
- Area served: Nevada; Northern California
- Key people: Cameron Kelly
- Products: Beer
- Production output: 7,932 barrels (2013)
- Owner: Tom Young
- Website: greatbasinbrewingco.com

Great Basin Brewing Co. is a brewery headquartered in Sparks, Nevada. It is Nevada’s oldest currently operating brewery—though not the state's longest operated. Great Basin beers are available as bottled draught beer at over 400 locations in Northern Nevada and the surrounding regions, including Aces Ballpark. It also serves beer at special events, such as the Best in the West Nugget Rib Cook-off and The Great Reno Balloon Race. Growlers and kegs may be purchased or filled at any of the company's tap rooms.

== History ==
The company was established in 1993 after Nevada brewers, including company founders Tom Young and Eric McClary, successfully lobbied the Nevada Legislature to allow for brewpubs in the state. The original brewery and restaurant is on Victorian Square in Sparks. Its beers were winning national awards as soon as the next year. The Reno location was opened in 2010 with the expectation that its added capacity would satisfy demand for the next five years. Great Basin began regular bottling operations in 2011 (holiday releases had previously been available for several years, but on the scale of a few hundred bottles a year) and currently bottles three of their flagship brews. As demand increased further, a third facility was established when Great Basin moved into the warehouse formerly occupied by the defunct Buckbean Brewery. Along with the facility, it also acquired Buckbean's equipment, which was modified to meet Great Basin's needs. Taps & Tanks opened to the public at this location in 2012, and a high speed bottling line was installed there the next year - providing capacity to bottle seasonal beers. In 2014, just one year later, Great Basin bottled its millionth beer. Great Basin saw increases in business every year during its first 20 years in operation. Taps & Tanks no longer serves the public due to new regulations on bars, but beer is still brewed and bottled there. In September 2021, Great Basin merged with Local Food Group and expanded into Carson, Nevada. In December 2023, Great Basin celebrated 30 years of operations. In 2024, Great Basin has expanded to Minden, Nevada.

== Beers ==
Great Basin brews several different beer styles and maintains ten to fourteen beers on tap. Many of its brews are seasonal or available for a limited time. Cask conditioned, barrel aged and nitrogenated beers are available by the glass on location.

=== Use in food ===
Great Basin also integrates its beers into its food menu. It reuses spent barley left over from mashing along with brewer's yeast in artisan bread. As a result of these and similar initiatives, 95% of Great Basin's waste output is reduced.

=== Awards and recognitions ===
Great Basin's brews have garnered several awards at many national and international beer competitions.

Name	Style	Honors
Bitchin' Berry	Fruit wheat beer	Great American Beer Festival- 2013-Silver, 2019- Gold. World Beer Cup 2018 - Bronze
Black Rock ESB	Extra Special Bitter	2001 World Beer Cup Silver
Blood Orange Wit	Fruited Belgian	2018 Great American Beer Festival Silver
Cerveza ChileBeso	Jalapeño-spiced pilsner	1999 Great American Beer Festival Gold, 1997 Great American Beer Festival Gold, 1994 Great American Beer Festival Gold
Death by Chocolate Stout	Chocolate-flavored stout	2002 World Beer Cup Gold
Firelit Haze	Hazy IPA	2021 USA Beer Ratings SIlver
Ichthyosaur IPA	India Pale Ale	2006 World Beer Championships Silver, 2020 Best of Craft Gold, 2021 USA Beer Ratings Silver
Jackpot Porter	Porter	2012 Beverage Testing Institute 86
Leave No Trace Lager	Munich Style Helles Lager	2021 USA Beer Ratings Gold
Nevada Gold	Kölsch	2001 Beverage Testing Institute Silver
Outlaw Milk Stout (Note: Outlaw Oatmeal Stout and Outlaw Milk Stout are the same product)	Sweet oatmeal stout	2014 World Beer Cup Silver, 2014 Great American Beer Festival Bronze, 2012 World Beer Cup Silver, 2011 Great American Beer Festival Bronze, 2008 World Beer Cup Silver, 2002 World Beer Championship Silver, 2012 Beverage Testing Institute 86, 2019 Best of Craft Gold, 2021 USA Beer Ratings Silver
Red Nose Holiday Wassail	Christmas beer	2012 Beverage Testing Institute 86
Rosemary Rye Patch	Rosemary-spiced rye beer	1998 Great American Beer Festival Gold
Slam Dunkel	Dunkel	2008 World Beer Cup Silver, 2001 World Beer Cup Bronze, 2000 Great American Beer Festival Silver
Smokecreek Rauchbier	Rauchbier	2006 Great American Beer Festival Gold
Stone Mother Märzen	Märzen	2006 World Beer Championships Bronze
Tectonic Event DIPA	Double India Pale Ale	2018 New York International Beer Competition Gold, 2021 USA Beer Ratings SIlver
Truckee River Red Ale	Red/Amber Ale	2018 World Beer Cup Bronze
Whoop-Ass Witbier	Witbier	2010 World Beer Cup Bronze, 2013 Beverage Testing Institute 87
Wild Horse Ale	Altbier-style amber ale	1995 Great American Beer Festival Bronze, 1994 Great American Beer Festival Bronze, 2018 Best of Craft Gold
Wild Lemon Wheat	Wheat ale	2010 Great American Beer Festival Bronze

== See also ==
- Alcohol laws of Nevada
- List of breweries in Nevada
- Barrel-aged beer
- List of defunct breweries in the United States
