= Alcohol law in Washington =

Alcohol law in Washington may refer to:

- Alcohol law in Washington (state)
- Alcohol law in Washington, D.C.
