= Indiana Code =

Laws of the state of Indiana

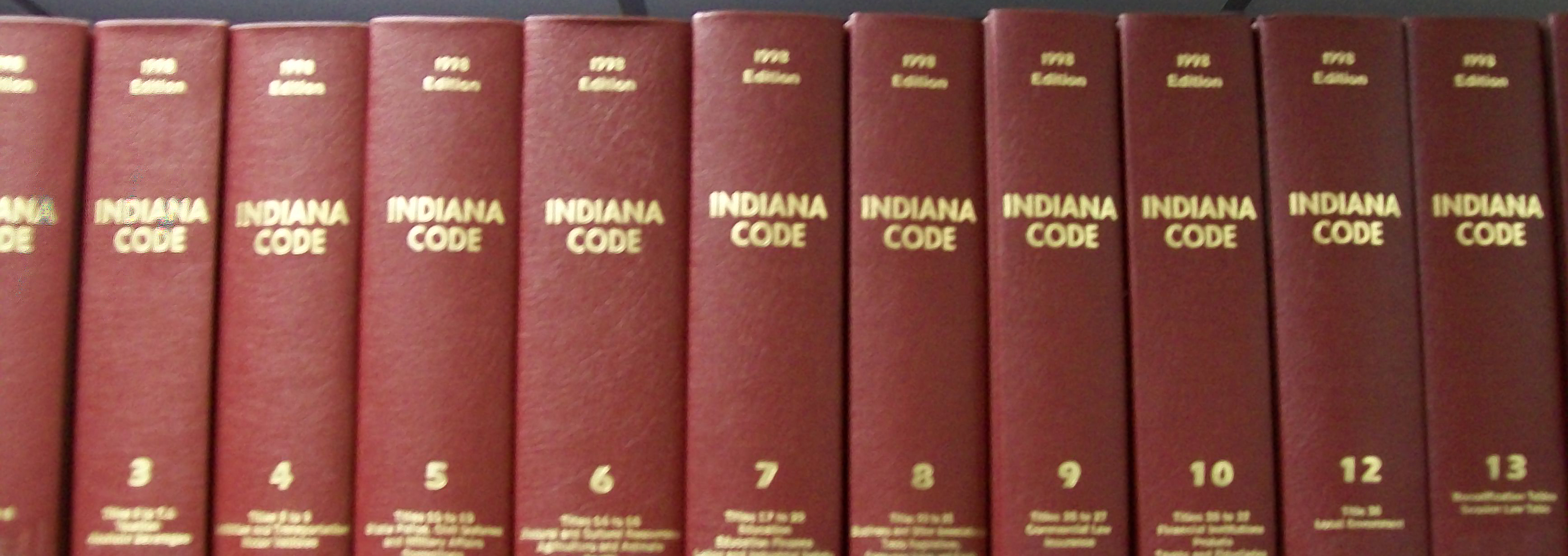
The Indiana Code in book form

The Indiana Code is the code of laws for the U.S. state of Indiana. The contents are the codification of all the laws currently in effect within Indiana. With roots going back to the Northwest Ordinance of 1787, the laws of Indiana have been revised many times. The current approach to updating Indiana Code began in 1971 when the Indiana Statute Revision Commission began a complete rearrangement. The first official edition of the Indiana Code was published in 1976, and is regularly updated through the Office of Code Revision in the Legislative Services Agency.

== Organization ==
An act of Congress, approved by the president on May 7, 1800, established the Indiana Territory as a separate governmental unit. The first General Assembly of the Indiana Territory met on July 29, 1805, and shortly after the Revised Statutes of 1807 was the official body of law. Indiana's constitution, adopted in 1816, specified that all laws in effect for the Territory would be considered laws of the state, until they expired or were repealed. Indiana laws were revised many times over the years, but the current approach to updating the code in a regular manner began in 1971. A special agency was established to reorganize the entire body of law for the State of Indiana, leading to the development of 36 distinct Titles that correspond to subject categories.

The first official edition of the Indiana Code was published by West Publishing Company, under direction of the Indiana Legislative Council. Responsibility for publishing the Code was later assumed by the Legislative Services Agency, through the Office of Code Revision and working with the Code Revision Commission. The current version of the Code, along with archived material, can be found at the Indiana General Assembly website: iga.in.gov.

== Titles ==
- Title 1. GENERAL PROVISIONS
- Title 2. GENERAL ASSEMBLY
- Title 3. ELECTIONS
- Title 4. STATE OFFICES AND ADMINISTRATION
- Title 5. STATE AND LOCAL ADMINISTRATION
- Title 6. TAXATION
- Title 7. ALCOHOL AND TOBACCO
- Title 8. UTILITIES AND TRANSPORTATION
- Title 9. MOTOR VEHICLES
- Title 10. PUBLIC SAFETY
- Title 11. CORRECTIONS
- Title 12. HUMAN SERVICES
- Title 13. ENVIRONMENT
- Title 14. NATURAL AND CULTURAL RESOURCES
- Title 15. AGRICULTURE AND ANIMALS
- Title 16. HEALTH
- Title 17. REPEALED
- Title 18. REPEALED
- Title 19. REPEALED
- Title 20. EDUCATION
- Title 21. HIGHER EDUCATION
- Title 22. LABOR AND SAFETY
- Title 23. BUSINESS AND OTHER ASSOCIATIONS
- Title 24. TRADE REGULATION
- Title 25. PROFESSIONS AND OCCUPATIONS
- Title 26. COMMERCIAL LAW
- Title 27. INSURANCE
- Title 28. FINANCIAL INSTITUTIONS
- Title 29. PROBATE
- Title 30. TRUSTS AND FIDUCIARIES
- Title 31. FAMILY LAW AND JUVENILE LAW
- Title 32. PROPERTY
- Title 33. COURTS AND COURT OFFICERS
- Title 34. CIVIL LAW AND PROCEDURE
- Title 35. CRIMINAL LAW AND PROCEDURE
- Title 36. LOCAL GOVERNMENT

== See also ==
- Alcohol laws of Indiana
- Capital punishment in Indiana
- Constitution of Indiana
- Government of Indiana
- Gun laws in Indiana

== Sources ==
- History of Official Indiana Statutes, 2016 Replacement Volume, Indiana Code, Titles 1 to 3, Edited and Published by the Office of Code Revision, Legislative Services Agency, Under the Direction of the Indiana Legislative Council.
- Woollen, William Wesley (1975). Biographical and Historical Sketches of Early Indiana. Ayer Publishing. ISBN 0-405-06896-4.
