= Nevada wine =

Wine made in U.S. state of Nevada

Nevada
- Wine region
- Official name: State of Nevada
- Type: U.S. State Appellation
- Year established: 1864
- Years of wine industry: 1990 to present
- Country: United States
- Sub-regions: None
- Total area: 70.3 million acres (109,781 sq mi)
- Size of planted vineyards: Under 40 acres
- No. of vineyards: 8
- Grapes produced: Cabernet Sauvignon, Chardonnay, Cinsault, Frontenac, Gewürztraminer, La Crosse, Merlot, Riesling, Roussillon, Ruby Cabernet, Petite Sirah, Semillon, Syrah, Tempranillo, Zinfandel
- No. of wineries: 4

Nevada wine refers to wine made from grapes grown in the U.S. state of Nevada, where wine has been produced since 1991. There are currently no designated American Viticultural Areas in Nevada.

Locally high boron content of the soil, soil salinity, and hard water provide a few challenges to growing grapes, especially Vitis vinifera. Some environmental elements common to Nevada however are favorable for viticulture; these include the ample sunshine, low humidity (which decreases the risk for rot and mildew and thus the need for fungicides) University of Nevada, Reno professor Dr. Grant Cramer studied the best varietals and techniques at UNR's Valley Road Vineyard. Wine grapes have been successfully grown in both the northern and southern part of the state since 1991, and all five wineries produce wines from Nevada grapes.

Until recently, state law restricted commercial wineries so that they were illegal in counties with more than 100,000 people (Washoe and Clark Counties). This was due to lobbying by the liquor distributors in the State for fight to control the liquor supply. With the passage of Assembly Bill 4 (AB4)in November 2015 AB4 Overview this law was changed. Since then three wineries have filed for licenses and began winemaking in Reno (Basin and Range Cellars, Nevada Sunset Winery and Great Basin Winery. The laws for winemaking in Nevada are still considered to be restrictive when compared to neighboring states that have successful wine industries. Additionally, instructional wine-making facilities (such as the Valley Road Vineyard) may operate in any county but must meet special license requirements and are restricted to selling or distributing no more than 60 gallons of wine in any 12-month period.

== See also ==
- Alcohol laws of Nevada
- American wine
