= Alcohol laws of Indiana =

Alcohol laws of Indiana, United States are enforced by the Indiana Alcohol and Tobacco Commission since 1933, following the Repeal of Prohibition.

Until 2018, Indiana was one of nearly a dozen U.S. states to ban all Sunday alcohol sales outside of bars and restaurants. That ban was repealed when Senate Bill 1 was signed by Gov. Eric Holcomb on February 28, 2018. Effective March 4, 2018, convenience stores, grocers, and liquor stores may sell alcohol from 12:00 PM to 8:00 PM on Sundays and from 7:00 AM to 3:00 AM Monday-Saturday.

Effective July 4, 2010, beer sold in microbreweries may be sold on Sundays pursuant to Senate Bill 75. The sales must take place where the brewing is done. However, off-site sales may take place in trade shows and similar back door events.

A beer dealer shall not be entitled to sell beer and deliver beer for carry-out, or for delivery to a customer's residence or office, in a quantity that exceeds 864 US fluid ounces (25.6 L) in a single transaction. The limit for grocery or drug store retailers is 864 ounces.

Grocers, convenience stores and pharmacies are not allowed to sell cold beer, although liquor stores may do so.

Establishments that sell beverages by the "drink" must have food service for 25 persons at a minimum (hot soups, hot sandwiches, coffee, milk, and soft drinks) available at all times. Prior to 2024, it was unlawful for establishments to provide discounts on alcohol to certain customers or at certain times of day (e.g., during "happy hour") that are not available to everyone. Happy hours were made legal on July 1, 2024, with the restrictions that a price reduction cannot last more than four hours in one day and fifteen hours in one week and cannot take place between 9 p.m. and 3 a.m.

Sale or serving of alcoholic beverages from 3 a.m. Christmas Day until 7 a.m. December 26 was banned until HB 1542 was passed in 2015.

Indiana is not an alcoholic beverage control state.

Public intoxication is a class B misdemeanor in Indiana. Merely being intoxicated in public is not a violation. One must either be endangering one's own life, someone else's life; breaching the peace or in imminent danger of breaching the peace; or is harassing, annoying or alarming another person.

Public intoxication is a class B misdemeanor. Indiana has a photo identification requirement for all off-premises transactions to anyone younger than 40 years old.

== See also ==
- U.S. history of alcohol minimum purchase age by state
- Alcohol laws of the United States by state
- Alcohol monopoly
- Three-tier (alcohol distribution)
- Dry county
- Category:State alcohol agencies of the United States
- National Minimum Drinking Age Act of 1984
