= Everclear =

Brand name of rectified spirit

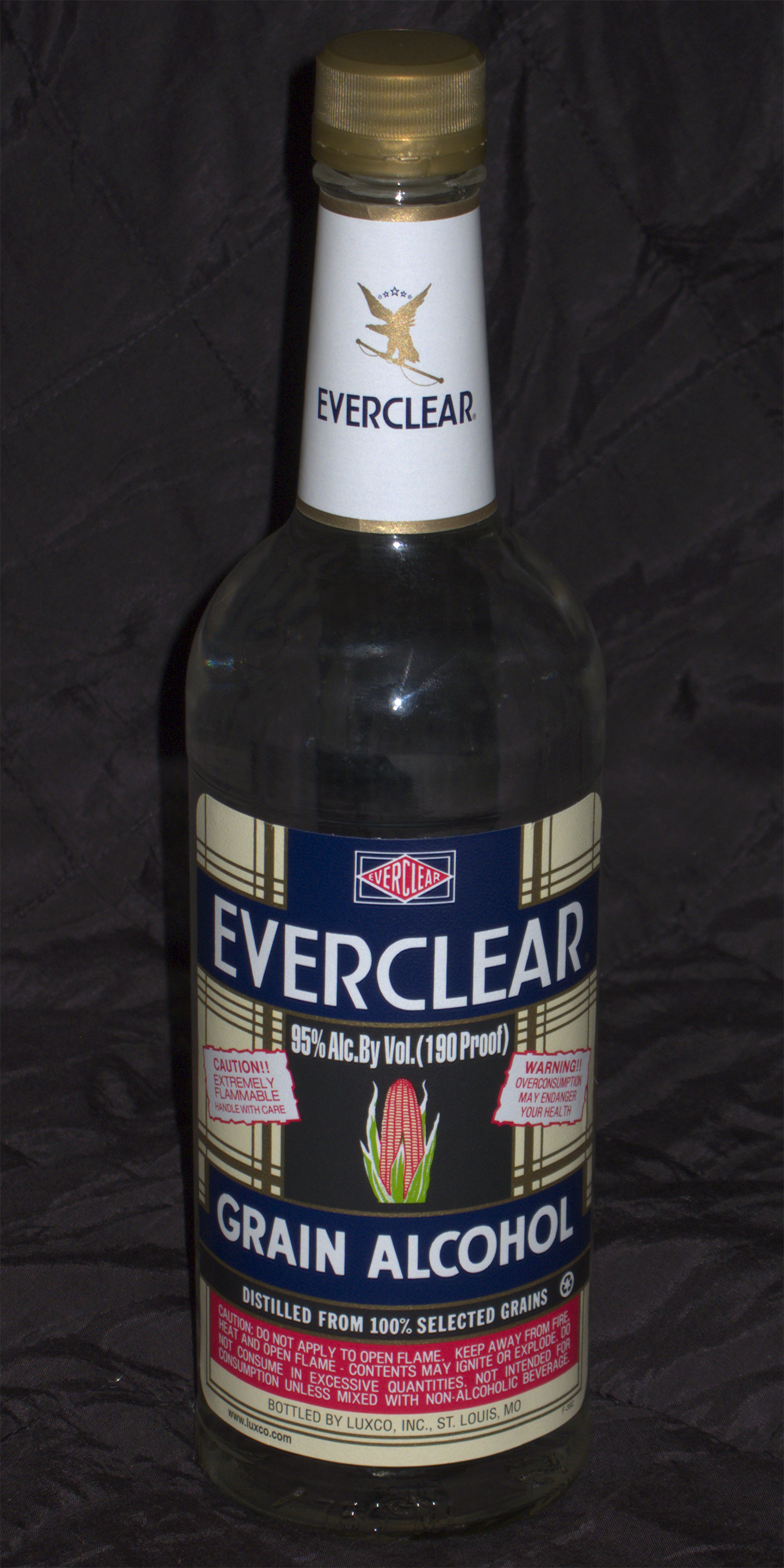
- A bottle of 190-proof Everclear, featuring the pre-2018 label design.
- Type: Rectified spirit
- Manufacturer: Luxco
- Origin: United States
- Introduced: c. 1922
- Alcohol by volume: 60%, 75.5%, 94.5% and 95%
- Proof (US): 120, 151, 189 and 190
- Color: Colorless
- Website: diywitheverclear.com

Everclear is a line of rectified spirits produced by the American company Luxco. It is made from grain and bottled at up to 95% alcohol by volume (190 U.S. proof). It has been criticized for its potency and has been at the center of public safety controversies. These concerns include risks of acute alcohol poisoning, its role as a facilitator in sexual assaults, and its high flammability, which has led to documented incidents of burn injuries. The manufacturer, Luxco, has faced legal action over an allegation of deceptive marketing practices after it removed explicit fire warnings from its labels while simultaneously promoting the product for dangerous uses.

== History and reputation ==
Everclear's notoriety was solidified in 1968 when the Guinness Book of World Records named it the "Most Potent Potable." For decades, it became culturally synonymous with college binge drinking, often treated as a rite of passage or used in hazardous party punches and drinking games. This reputation was built almost entirely through word-of-mouth, as Luxco did little to no formal marketing for the product, relying solely on notoriety until Luxco launched promotional campaigns in the mid-2010s. The name itself has become a generic term for any high-proof grain alcohol, and it inspired the name of the American rock band Everclear.

== Safety and health risks ==
The alcohol concentration of Everclear presents two primary dangers: rapid alcohol poisoning and extreme flammability.

=== Acute alcohol poisoning and sexual assault ===
At 95% ABV (190-proof), Everclear is more than twice as potent as standard spirits. This allows for the rapid consumption of a large quantity of alcohol, often masked in punches, leading to a dangerously high blood alcohol content and potentially fatal alcohol poisoning. University officials have singled out the product for its role in binge drinking and sexual assault. Frostburg State University President Jonathan C. Gibralter warned that "most of the time students don't even know they're consuming it," while other university leaders have called it a date rape drug. University of Virginia President Teresa Sullivan specifically compared the odorless and colorless Everclear to a "date rape" drug for its ability to create conditions in which sexual assaults can occur.

=== Extreme flammability and flame jetting ===
The burning alcohol can adhere to skin and fabric, causing deep and extensive third-degree burns.

== Labeling and marketing controversy ==
=== Removal of explicit warnings ===
For decades, Everclear bottles featured a prominent, explicit warning on the front label, often in a red box, stating:

CAUTION: DO NOT APPLY TO OPEN FLAME. KEEP AWAY FROM FIRE, HEAT AND OPEN FLAME – CONTENTS MAY IGNITE OR EXPLODE.

In 2018, as part of a major rebranding effort, Luxco removed this detailed warning. The new label relegated safety information to a small box on the back, containing only the words:

WARNING: FLAMMABLE LIQUID. HANDLE WITH CARE.

According to a 2025 lawsuit, Luxco's other chemically identical products retained more comprehensive warnings, suggesting the removal from the flagship Everclear brand was a deliberate choice.

=== Shift to "DIY" marketing ===
Coinciding with the removal of the explicit fire warnings, Luxco launched a marketing campaign called "Make It Your Own," repositioning Everclear from a party beverage to a versatile "DIY ingredient." Through a dedicated website and social media, the company began promoting the product for making infusions and tinctures, but also for uses involving ignition sources, such as for cooking, flambéing, and as fuel for fondue pots and homemade candles. Plaintiffs in subsequent lawsuits argued that this marketing was reckless, encouraging consumers to engage in the very behaviors the old warning labels had explicitly cautioned against.

== Incidents ==
Everclear's high alcohol content and flammability have been linked to several incidents involving severe burns, prompting legal and regulatory scrutiny. Notable cases include:

- January 2016: University of Toledo runner Janelle Noe was burned over more than 50% of her body with second and third degree burns at a party. The incident occurred when a former teammate poured Everclear onto a lit candle. Doctors told her that if she had "burned seconds longer, [she] would’ve died."
- October 2018: An accident occurred at a fraternity house at the University of Illinois Urbana-Champaign involving the use of Everclear. A student ignited the alcohol, resulting in a fire that caused injuries to another individual. The incident led to an investigation, but the student responsible did not face criminal charges.
- August 2024: Two patrons at a Dallas, Texas, bar, Abigael Hance-Briscoe and Dustin Johnson, suffered second and third-degree burns when a "Flaming Pineapple" cocktail made with Everclear exploded. A bartender allegedly added more Everclear to the flaming drink, causing it to ignite "in our direction." Hance-Briscoe stated, "My skin was falling off of my arms," and that her bra had "melted into [her] skin."
- May 2025: 22-year-old Boston University student Yvette Digan suffered severe burns during a party at the Zeta Psi fraternity house at Worcester Polytechnic Institute in Worcester, Massachusetts. The student alleged in a lawsuit that another student "poured Everclear near or onto an open fire in the backyard of the fraternity house, whose flames may not have been visible due to the way ethanol burns. When the Everclear vapors contacted the open flame, an enormous fireball instantly erupted [which] ignited her clothing and caused severe, life-altering burn injuries to substantial portions of her body."

After the May 2025 incident Digan filed a lawsuit in federal court accusing Luxco of negligence and deceptive practices for removing the explicit warnings while simultaneously marketing the product for dangerous uses. The suit alleged that Luxco "chose marketing aesthetics over preventing third-degree burns to unsuspecting young adults" and sought to force the company to halt sales until the original, comprehensive warnings were restored.

== State bans and regulation ==
While Everclear must comply with federal labeling and production standards, manufacturers remain subject to state law claims regarding product design, marketing practices, and failure to warn of specific risks not covered by federal requirements.

Due to its high alcohol content and associated risks, the 190-proof version of Everclear is illegal to sell in at least a dozen U.S. states, including Maryland, Virginia, West Virginia, and Pennsylvania. In 2014, Maryland banned the sale of all 190-proof grain spirits, with lawmakers hoping the measure would help reduce sexual assaults and binge drinking on college campuses. To circumvent these bans, Luxco created a 189-proof version as well as the lower 151- and 120-proof versions. Additionally, the Federal Aviation Administration (FAA) prohibits the transportation of alcoholic beverages exceeding 70% alcohol by volume (140 proof) on aircraft, classifying high-proof products like 190-proof Everclear as hazardous materials not permitted in either carry-on or checked baggage.
