= List of breweries in Nevada =

Nevada ranks 24th nationally in craft breweries per capita as of 2013. (Map based on 2012 statistics.)

This is a list of breweries in Nevada, both current and defunct. Brewing companies usually produce a range of beers in different styles that are marketed locally, regionally, and internationally. Brewing companies vary in the volume and variety of beer produced, usually being small nanobreweries and microbreweries or nationally owned brewpubs.

In 2012, Nevada's 27 brewing establishments (including breweries, brewpubs, importers, and company-owned packagers and wholesalers) employed 130 people directly, and more than 10,000 others in related jobs such as wholesaling and retailing. Altogether 19 people in Nevada had active brewer permits in 2012.

Including people directly employed in brewing, as well as those who supply Nevada's breweries with everything from ingredients to machinery, the total business and personal tax revenue generated by Nevada's breweries and related industries was more than $286 million. Consumer purchases of Nevada's brewery products generated more than $124 million extra in tax revenue. In 2012, according to the Brewers Association, Nevada ranked 24th in the number of craft breweries per capita with 21.

For context, at the end of 2013 there were 2,822 breweries in the United States, including 2,768 craft breweries subdivided into 1,237 brewpubs, 1,412 microbreweries and 119 regional craft breweries. In that same year, according to the Beer Institute, the brewing industry employed around 43,000 Americans in brewing and distribution and had a combined economic impact of more than $246 billion.

== History ==
Brewing in the Nevada predates statehood, as the Carson City Brewery opened in 1860 four years before admission to the Union. Brewing in Nevada virtually ceased with statewide prohibition starting one year prior to nationwide prohibition. Only Carson Brewery and Reno Brewery remained to continue production in the 1930s, but statewide beer production had ceased in 1957. Breweries have regained popularity in the state since brewpubs were legalized in 1993.

== Northern Nevada breweries ==
- Great Basin Brewing Company-Sparks, Reno.
- Revision Brewing - Reno, NV
- Lead Dog Brewing Company - Reno & Sparks, NV

== Southern Nevada breweries ==
- Triple 7 Restaurant and Brewery, Las Vegas
- Joseph James Brewing Company, Henderson (closed 2020)
- Holy Cow Brewery, Las Vegas (closed 2002)
- Ellis Island Casino & Brewery, Las Vegas

== National chains ==
- BJ's Restaurant & Brewery (three locations in the Las Vegas Valley and two in Reno/Sparks)
- Gordon Biersch Brewery Restaurant (two locations in the Las Vegas Valley)

== See also ==
- Beer in the United States
- List of breweries in the United States
- List of microbreweries
