= Montgomery County Alcohol Beverage Services =

Government agency of Montgomery County, Maryland, US

Agency overview
- Formed: July 1, 1951; 75 years ago
- Superseding agency: Montgomery County Liquor Dispensary
- Jurisdiction: Montgomery County, Maryland
- Headquarters: 201 Edison Park Drive, Gaithersburg, Maryland 20878, U.S. 39.113087°N 77.232878°W
- Employees: 442
- Annual budget: $264 million (2021)
- Agency executive: Kathie Durbin, Director
- Website: www.montgomerycountymd.gov/abs/

Alcohol Beverage Services, previously known as the Department of Liquor Control is a government agency within the County of Montgomery, Maryland, and is the wholesaler of beer, wine and spirits alcoholic beverage throughout the county's 507-square-mile (1,310 km^{2}) area. Montgomery County Department of Liquor Control also exercises control over retail sales for off-premises consumption, either through government-operated package stores or designated agents.

Alcohol Beverage Services (ABS) distributes beer, wine and spirits to approximately 1,100 licensed businesses and sells alcohol to go through its 25 owned and operated retail stores throughout the county. ABS is the only authorized seller of spirits for off-premises consumption in the county. Revenue generated from the sale of alcohol, about 30-35 million dollars annually, is deposited in the Montgomery County General Fund for the county to use on projects and services. The Public Health community, including the CDC, has identified the control model as a public safety initiative because it limits alcohol outlet density and associated issues.

For the fiscal year ended June 30, 2021, Montgomery County recognized $304 million of revenue from alcohol, and it incurred $264 million of operating expenses from alcohol, resulting in a net gain of $40 million.

== History ==
Between 1880 and 1933, sale of alcohol was prohibited within Montgomery County.

In December 1933, when prohibition was repealed in the United States, Montgomery County only allowed dispensaries located in Bethesda, Rockville, and Silver Spring to sell alcoholic beverages. The dispensaries then could sell beer and light wine to retailers in the county for resale. The dispensaries were not allowed to sell hard liquor for on-premises consumption. Country clubs were also allowed to sell beer and light wine for on-premises and off-premises consumption.

The first beer-and-wine license in Montgomery County was issued to Fred Salamy for Fred's Country Store. In 1961, the license was transferred to Henry J. Dietle to be used at Hank Dietle's in Rockville. Hank Dietle's had originally opened in 1916 as a general store named Offutt's.

Montgomery County Liquor Dispensary, a state-run agency, used to control liquor sales in the county. Stores selling beer were only allowed to buy beer from the Montgomery County Liquor Dispensary, not from beer wholesalers. On February 1, 1951, Montgomery County's representatives in the Maryland General Assembly introduced a law to change the agency from a state-run agency to a county-run agency. The law passed and was effective July 1 1951.

The Montgomery County Department of Liquor Control was officially established on July 1, 1951. Montgomery County's Liquor Control Board was created under the terms of Section 159 of Article 2B of the Annotated Code of Maryland. The Board of License Commissioners, which had been created on December 5, 1933, became a completely separate entity. The Board is responsible for licensing and regulation of liquor, a responsibility which they share with the county police department.

A Maryland law passed in 1978 prohibited chain and discount stores from having alcohol licenses. The same law said that only a Maryland resident could have an alcohol license and that each person could only have one alcohol license. The chain-store law was enacted in the early 1980s after a push from small, local retail businesses. A grandfather clause to the law allowed four grocery chains, namely Giant Food, Safeway, Shoppers Food & Pharmacy, and Magruder's, were each allowed to have an alcohol license for exactly one location in Montgomery County. 7-Eleven was allowed one alcohol license, which was located Aspen Hill. An alcohol license was able to be transferred to any of the chain's other locations in Montgomery County, subject to approval by the county Board of License Commissioners. The 7-Eleven license was challenged in 2017 by small business retailers and eventually revoked in 2018 for violating the chain-store restriction. The chain store law is independent of ABS. In fact, the majority of control jurisdictions have alcohol sales in chain stores. The state law changed since then, and grocery stores and other stores are now allowed to have licenses to sell beer and wine.

== See also ==
- Alcohol laws of Maryland
