= Liquor regulation in the United States =

In the United States, production of liquor is regulated at the national level under USC Title 26 subtitle E Ch51. Numerous requirements must be met to do so, and production carries an excise tax. Owning or operating a distillation apparatus without filing the proper paperwork and paying the taxes carries federal criminal penalties. In addition, the Twenty-first Amendment to the United States Constitution grants each state and territory the power to regulate intoxicating liquors within their jurisdiction. As such, laws pertaining to the production, sale, distribution, and consumption of alcohol vary significantly across the country.

== Federal regulatory framework ==
Distilled spirits fall under the regulatory authority of the Alcohol and Tobacco Tax and Trade Bureau (TTB), a bureau within the U.S. Department of the Treasury. The TTB implements and enforces the Federal Alcohol Administration Act (FAA Act) and relevant portions of the Internal Revenue Code, which govern the production, labeling, and distribution of alcoholic beverages.

== Certificate of Label Approval (COLA) process ==
Before any distilled spirit can be bottled, packaged, sold, or shipped in interstate commerce, manufacturers must obtain a Certificate of Label Approval (COLA) from the TTB. The COLA process requires producers to submit their proposed labels through the TTB's online system, COLAs Online, for review and approval. Processing typically takes 5 to 15 business days.

The COLA process ensures mandatory information is present (brand name, ABV, mandatory health hazard statement, bottler identity), but does not provide comprehensive safety review. TTB Form 5100.31 states that approval "does not relieve" manufacturers of liability under federal or state law. Courts have held that COLA issuance does not immunize producers from state law claims. In O'Hara v. Diageo‑Guinness USA, Inc. (D. Mass. 2019), Chapter 93A consumer‑protection claims were reinstated when the court found the TTB had never approved the challenged carton statements, despite approving bottle labels.

== Absence of federal preemption ==
TTB approval of a COLA does not create federal preemption of state law claims or provide immunity from product liability lawsuits. Unlike some federal regulatory schemes that explicitly preempt state tort claims, the FAA Act and TTB regulations do not contain broad preemption provisions that would shield manufacturers from state court litigation.

The Alcoholic Beverage Labeling Act (ABLA) of 1988 does provide limited preemption, but only regarding health warning statements on containers. Under 27 U.S.C. § 216, states cannot require additional health-related warnings beyond the federally mandated statement about pregnancy risks and impaired driving. However, this preemption is narrowly construed and applies only to the specific health warning language on labels, not to broader product liability claims or marketing practices.

Federal courts have consistently held that COLA approval does not immunize producers from lawsuits alleging customer deception, inadequate warnings, or product liability theories. The TTB's own COLA form makes clear that approval "does not relieve you from liability for violations" of federal or state law.

== State regulatory authority ==
States retain significant authority to regulate alcohol sales and distribution within their borders under the Twenty-first Amendment to the United States Constitution. While federal law governs interstate commerce in alcoholic beverages, states can impose additional requirements for products sold within their jurisdictions, provided they do not directly conflict with federal labeling mandates.

Several states have banned or restricted the sale of high-proof grain alcohols like Everclear, demonstrating that federal approval does not preclude state-level restrictions. These state bans are generally upheld as valid exercises of state police power over alcohol regulation.

== Regulatory gaps and limitations ==
The current federal regulatory framework has notable limitations regarding high-proof alcohol products. The TTB's review process does not include comprehensive safety assessments of alcohol products beyond ensuring compliance with labeling requirements. Unlike the Food and Drug Administration's oversight of other consumer products, the TTB does not conduct pre-market safety reviews or require manufacturers to demonstrate that their products are safe for intended use.

The TTB has acknowledged that its labeling requirements may need updating, with proposed rules in 2025 requiring new alcohol content and allergen disclosures.
