= Drug policy of Maryland =

Overview of the drug policy of the U.S. state of Maryland

The U.S. state of Maryland has various policies regarding the production, sale, and use of different classes and kinds of drugs.

== Specific drugs ==
=== Alcohol ===
As of July 2024, the sales tax for purchasing alcohol in Maryland is 9 percent. The tax was raised from 6 percent effective July 1, 2011; the increase was expected to generate $85 million for state programs in its first year.

Businesses that operate in the state of Maryland have certain requirements if they serve alcohol. Any employee that handles alcohol must be at least 18 years of age. Bartenders and restaurant servers also have the responsibility of monitoring their customers' alcohol consumption in order to help prevent drunk driving. If the bartender or server is shown to have known and purposefully neglected this responsibility, the employee can be held criminally responsible. They are also required to verify the age of those purchasing alcohol, to ensure consumers are of the legal age. As of right now, the minimum legal age to purchase alcohol in Maryland is 21.

It is against the law to misrepresent one's age by using another's identification or a fake identification. The penalties for this include:

- fines of up to $2,000
- imprisonment of up to 3 years
- suspension or revocation of one's driver's license

If the violator is under the age of 18, she or he may be required to attend a supervised work or alcohol rehabilitation program, and the violator's guardian(s) may be asked to withdraw consent for the violator to hold a license.

==== Drinking and driving ====
When a prospective driver is given a license in the state of Maryland, they are required to sign an agreement to submit to a blood alcohol test if asked by a police officer. Refusal to take the test results in a 120-day suspension of the offender's license. If the offender is detained a second time, and again refuses to take a blood alcohol test, an automatic one-year suspension of the offender's license goes into effect.

Driving drunk is punished with fines, license suspension, and jail time. The penalties vary depending on the circumstances.

If the offender is under the age of 21 and shown to have a blood alcohol level of 0.02% or higher, the offender's license may be revoked or suspended and the offender may face a fine of up to $500.

The legal blood alcohol content limit for anyone over the age of 21 is 0.08%, in which case the driver may be charged with a DWI (driving while intoxicated). If the offender is driving with a blood alcohol content of 0.04-0.08%, they may be cited for driving under the influence. If the offender is considered to be intoxicated, the penalties are as follows:

- a 45-day license suspension for the first offense
- a 90-day license suspension for the second offense
- loss of driving privileges

If the offender is transporting a minor at the time, the offender may face a fine of up to $4,000 and a prison sentence of up to four years.

If the offender is a first-time offender, or has not had any convictions of DUI/DWI in the past ten years, then the offender can plead for Probation Before Judgement (PBJ). PBJ is pleading "not guilty" with intention that the offender gets placed on probation before they have been found guilty of the crime they have been charged for. This prevents the charge on the individuals record in compliance that the violation never occurs again, and that their record will maintain being charge-free.

=== Cannabis ===
In May 2003, Governor Bob Ehrlich signed legislation into law that allowed those being prosecuted for marijuana-related crimes to raise an “affirmative defense of medical necessity” at trial. At the time, the courts were required to consider such a mitigating factor, whereafter only a maximum penalty of $100 could be imposed.

In April 2014, Governor Martin O'Malley signed a law that decriminalized the possession of 10 grams or less of marijuana. The measure made such possession a civil infraction, similar to that of a traffic ticket.

In 2016, the Maryland General Assembly, under Democratic control, passed SB 517, which decriminalized the possession of marijuana paraphernalia and decriminalized the smoking of marijuana in public.

In Pacheco v. State (2019), the Maryland Court of Appeals determined that "the mere odor of marijuana coupled with possession of what is clearly less than ten grams of marijuana, absent other circumstances, does not grant officers probable cause to effectuate an arrest and conduct a search".

In 2022, Maryland voters approved a referendum on the legalization of cannabis for adult use in Maryland. The law allows for the possession of up to 1.5 ounces of marijuana for recreational use, as well as the growing and maintaining of no more than two cannabis plants out of public view. It came into force on July 1, 2023.

=== Cocaine ===
The decade spanning 2008–2018 saw a surge of 590% in cocaine-related deaths. This sharp spike is largely attributable to cocaine usage in combination with opioids — in 2018, 88.9% of cocaine-related deaths occurred in combination with fentanyl. Almost 900 people died from cocaine-related overdoses in Maryland in 2018. Of these, 423 deaths occurred in Baltimore. Despite only accounting for 10% of Maryland’s population, Baltimore accounts for nearly half of cocaine-related deaths.

The sale, distribution and production of cocaine is illegal and is a felony in every state. Possession of small amounts of cocaine can lead to serious penalties. Additionally, the severity of the punishment varies depending on whether the defendant has prior drug convictions and the quantity of drugs involved.

The table below outlines the charges and penalties under Maryland's cocaine laws.

Code Section	Art. 27 §§276, et seq
Possession	Misdemeanor with penalty of up to 4 yrs. and/or $25,000; Bringing 28 g. into state: felony with penalty of up to $50,000 and/or 25 yrs.; Subsequent offense: double penalties
Distribution	Felony with penalty of 20 yrs. and/or $25,000; Sale of more than 448 g. or 50 g. of crack: not less than 40 yrs.; Subsequent offense: double penalties; 2 yrs. mandatory, not less than 10 yr. sentence; Third offense: not less than 40 yrs. Sale to minors or near school property: stricter penalties
Trafficking	If "drug kingpin" 20-40 yrs. and/or $1,000,000 fine

However, these penalties may not be applied to all offenders as prosecutors can offer plea bargains in exchange for helping to build a case against those higher up the chain such as producers and dealers. Furthermore, first-time or second-time offenders may be offered time spent in rehabilitation rather than in jail.

Additionally, violating Maryland’s controlled dangerous substances laws as a first time offender allows the individual to qualify pleading Probation Before Judgement. Utilizing this statute is pleading not guilty and for probation before the charged crime is to be found guilty. There are guidelines to whom this applies to and any individual who has two or subsequent violations of Maryland’s controlled dangerous substances laws are not eligible.

== See also ==
- Annotated Code of Maryland
- Federal drug policy of the United States
