= History of alcohol minimum purchase age by U.S. jurisdiction =

The alcohol laws of the United States regarding minimum age for purchase have changed over time. In colonial America, generally speaking, there were no purchase ages, and alcohol consumption by young teenagers was common, even in taverns. In post-Revolutionary America, such freedom gradually reduced due to religious sentiments (as embodied in the temperance movement) and a growing recognition in the medical community about the dangers of alcohol. The more modern history is given in the table below. Unless otherwise noted, if different alcohol categories have different minimum purchase ages, the age listed below is set at the lowest age given (e.g. if the purchase age is 18 for beer and 21 for wine or spirits, as was the case in several states, the age in the table will read as "18", not "21"). In addition, the purchase age is not necessarily the same as the minimum age for consumption of alcoholic beverages, although they have often been the same.

As one can see in the table below, there has been much volatility in the states' purchase ages since the repeal of Prohibition in 1933. Shortly after the ratification of the 21st amendment in December, most states set their purchase ages at 21 since that was the voting age at the time. Most of these limits remained constant until the early 1970s. From 1969 to 1976, some 30 states lowered their purchase ages, generally to 18. This was primarily because the voting age was lowered from 21 to 18 in 1971 with the passing into law of the 26th amendment. Many states started to lower their minimum purchase age in response, most of this occurring in 1972 or 1973. Twelve states kept their purchase ages at 21 since repeal of Prohibition and never changed them.

From 1976 to 1983, several states voluntarily raised their purchase ages to 19 (or, less commonly, 20 or 21), in part to combat drunk driving fatalities. In 1984, Congress passed the National Minimum Drinking Age Act, which required states to raise their ages for purchase and public possession to 21 by October 1986 or lose 10% of their federal highway funds. By mid-1988, all 50 states and the District of Columbia had raised their purchase ages to 21 (but not Puerto Rico, Guam, or the Virgin Islands, see Additional Notes below). South Dakota and Wyoming were the final two states to comply with the age 21 mandate. The current purchase age of 21 remains a point of contention among many Americans, because of it being higher than the age of majority (18 in most states) and higher than the purchase ages of most other countries. The National Minimum Drinking Age Act is also seen as a congressional sidestep of the Tenth Amendment. Although debates have not been highly publicized, a few states have proposed legislation to lower their purchase age, while Guam raised its purchase age to 21 in July 2010.

Minimum legal purchase age as of 1969 (two years before the 26th Amendment was enacted in 1971):

Minimum legal purchase age as of 1975 (when most states had their lowest age limit):
Detail on dual age limits
Both age limits apply for following states:
Illinois: The legal purchase age is 19 for beer and wine, and 21 for liquor.
Maryland, North Carolina, South Carolina, Virginia, and Washington, D.C.: The legal purchase age is 18 for beer and wine, and 21 for liquor.
Kansas, Ohio, Oklahoma, and South Dakota: The legal purchase age is 18 for 3.2% ABV beer, and 21 for beer stronger than 3.2% ABV, wine, and liquor.

Minimum legal purchase age as of 1983 (one year before the National Minimum Drinking Age Act was passed):

Minimum age is 21
Minimum age is 20
Minimum age is 19 and 21
Minimum age is 19
Minimum age is 18 and 21
Minimum age is 18

State	Pre-Prohibition (prior to 1919)	Post-Prohibition (after 1933)	1970s / 26th Amendment (adopted in 1971)	1980s / Drinking Age Act of 1984	21st century
Alabama	Pre 1881: None; 1881: 21 (none with consent of parent)	21	1975: Lowered to 19	1986: Raised to 21	21 (no one underage is allowed consumption Section 28-1)
Alaska	N/A	21	1970: Lowered to 19	1984: Raised to 21 with grandfather clause (if born before January 1, 1965)	21 (unless the underage person is not on a licensed premises and the alcoholic beverage is provided by a parent, legal guardian, or spouse over the age of 21)
Arizona	N/A	21	1972: Lowered to 19	1985: Raised to 21	21
Arkansas	Pre 1925: None; 1925: 21	21	21	21	21
California	Pre 1891: Regulated by municipality/county (common age was 16); 1891: 18 (statewide)	1933: 21	21	21	21 (except small amounts for religious ceremonies)
Colorado	None	(Dec) 1945: 18: for 3.2% near-beer 21: for wine and liquor	18 for 3.2% beer; 21 for wine and liquor	Raised to 21 on Jul 31 1987 (with grandfather clause)	21
Connecticut	21	21	1972: Lowered to 18	1982: Raised to 19; 1983: Raised to 20; 1985: Raised to 21	21 (exemptions: (1) a person over age eighteen who is an employee or permit holder under section 30-90a and who possesses alcoholic liquor in the course of such person's employment or business, (2) a minor who possesses alcoholic liquor on the order of a practicing physician, or (3) a minor who possesses alcoholic liquor while accompanied by a parent, guardian or spouse of the minor, who has attained the age of twenty-one. Nothing in this subsection shall be construed to burden a person's exercise of religion under section 3 of article first of the Constitution of the state in violation of subsection (a) of section 52-571b.
Delaware	N/A	21	1972: Lowered to 20	1984: Raised to 21	21
District of Columbia	N/A	18: for beer and wine 21: for liquor	18: for beer and wine 21: for liquor	1986: Raised to 21 with grandfather clause.	21
Florida	N/A	21	1973:Lowered to 18 1980: 19	1986: Raised to 21 with grandfather clause	21
Georgia	N/A	21	1972: Lowered to 18	1982: Raised to 19; 1985: Raised to 20; 1986: Raised to 21	21
Hawaii	N/A	21	1972: Lowered to 18	1986: Raised to 21	21
Idaho	N/A	20: for beer 21: for wine and liquor	1972: Lowered to 19 (all)	1987: Raised to 21 in 1987 (Apr 11) with grandfather clause	21
Illinois	1872: Age of majority (none with written consent of parent)	pre 1961: Age of majority 1961: Raised to 21	1973: Lowered to 19: for beer and wine 21: for liquor	1980: Raised to 21	21
Indiana	N/A	Post-1934: 21	21	21	21
Iowa	N/A	21	1972: Lowered to 19 in 1972 (Jul 1); 1973: Lowered to 18 in 1973 (Jul 1); 1978: Raised to 19 in 1978 (Jul 1)	1986: Raised to 21 in 1986 (Jul 1) with grandfather clause.	21
Kansas	N/A	1949: 18: for beer and wine with less than 4% ABV; 21: for liquor	18: for beer and wine with less than 4% ABV; 21: for beer and wine with 4% ABV or more 21: for liquor	1985: Raised to 21	21 (However, anyone under 21 may consume cereal malt beverages with parental supervision on their own property)
Kentucky	N/A	1938: 21	21	21	21
Louisiana	None	18	18	1987: Raised to 21 de jure in 1987, but de facto age was still 18 until 1995 due to a sale loophole. 1995: De facto age raised to 21 in 1995 when loophole was closed. 1996: In 1996, briefly lowered by Louisiana Supreme Court to 18 until it reversed its decision, raising to 21 three months later. Other exceptions still remain.	21 (Exceptions to state law include): *Religious purposes; *When accompanied by a parent, spouse, or legal guardian 21 or over; *For medical purposes; *In a private residence, including up to 20 acres; *The sale, handling, transport, or service of alcoholic beverages in lawful ownership of an establishment or lawful employment of a person under 21 by a licensed manufacturer, wholesaler, or retailer.
Maine	N/A	21; 1969: Lowered to 20	1972: Lowered to 18; 1977: Raised to 20	1985: Raised to 21	21 (however minors can drink at home with parental supervision)
Maryland	N/A	21	1974: Lowered to 18: for beer and wine 21: for liquor	1982: Raised to 21 with grandfather clause for those born June 30, 1964, or earlier	21 (however anyone can drink when parents, spouses, teachers are present)
Massachusetts	N/A	21	1973: Lowered to 18; 1979: Raised to 20 in 1979 (Apr 16)	Raised to 21 in 1985 (with grandfather clause)	21
Michigan	N/A	21	1972: Lowered to 18 in 1972 (Jan 1)	1978: Raised to 19 in 1978 (Dec 3); 1978: Raised to 21 in 1978 (Dec 21), 18 days later. First state to raise age to 21 since it was lowered	21
Minnesota	N/A	21	1973: Lowered to 18 (June 1); 1976: Raised to 19 (Sept 1); First state to raise age after lowering.	1986: Raised to 21	21
Mississippi	?	1966: 18: for beer and wine 21: for liquor (alcohol not legalized until 1966)	21	Raised to 21 in 1986	21
Missouri	?	1945: 21	21	21	21
Montana	?	21	1971: Lowered to 19; 1973: Lowered to 18; 1979: Raised to 19	1987: Raised to 21	21
Nebraska	?	21; 1969: Lowered to 20	1972: Lowered to 19	1980: Raised to 20; 1985: Raised to 21	21
Nevada	?	1933: 21	21	21	21
New Hampshire	?	21	1973: Lowered to 18; 1979: Raised to 20	1985: Raised to 21	21
New Jersey	Before 1880: None; Post-1880: 18 (penalties only against businesses)	21	1973: Lowered to 18	1980: Raised to 19; 1983: Raised to 21	21 (As of February 22, 2021, there are no longer any penalties for underage drinking besides warnings.)
New Mexico	?	1934: 21	21	21	21
New York	18 (16 before 1896)	Initially 21 immediately after Prohibition, then reduced to 18 four months later.	18	1982: Raised to 19 in 1982 (Dec); 1985: Raised to 21 in 1985 (Dec)	21 (Any Age with Parental Consent)
North Carolina	?	18	18: for beer and wine 21: for liquor	1983: 19: for beer and wine 21: for liquor 1986: Raised to 21 in 1986 (Sep 1)	21
North Dakota	?	1936: 21	21	21	21
Ohio	?	1933: 16 1935: 18: for 3.2% ABW beer 21: for beer stronger than 3.2% ABW, wine and liquor	18: for 3.2% ABW beer 21: for beer stronger than 3.2% ABW, wine and liquor	1982 ^{(Aug. 19 to Oct. 1)}: 19: for 3.2% ABW beer 21: for beer stronger than 3.2% ABW, wine and liquor 1982 ^{(From Oct. 1)}: 19: beer 21: wine and liquor 1988: 21	21 (However, anyone can drink with parents or legal-age spouse)
Oklahoma	?	Men: 21; Women: 18: 3.2% ABW beer 21: for beer stronger than 3.2% ABW, wine and liquor	1976: Lowered to 18 (for 3.2% ABW beer) for both sexes in 1976 (Dec); Last state to lower the purchase age.	1983: Raised to 21	21
Oregon	?	1933: 21	21	21	21
Pennsylvania	?	1935: 21	21	21	21
Rhode Island	?	21	1970: Lowered to 18	1980: Raised to 19; 1981: Raised to 20; 1984: Raised to 21	21
South Carolina	21	1935: 18: for beer and wine 21: for liquor	18	1984: 19: for beer and wine 21: for liquor 1985: Raised to 20; 1986: Raised to 21	21
South Dakota	?	1934: 21 (all); 1939: Lowered to 18: for 3.2% beer Raised to 19: for 3.2% beer	1972: 18: for 3.2% beer; 21: for wine and liquor	1984: 19: for beer and wine 21: for liquor 1988: Raised to 21	21
Tennessee	Pre 1881: None; 1881: 21	21; 1964: Lowered to 18	1979: Raised to 19	1984: Raised to 21	21
Texas	Pre 1909: 21; None (with written permission of parent or guardian); Post 1909: 21	21	1973: Lowered to 18	1981: Raised to 19; 1986: Raised to 21 in 1986 (Sep 1)	Parent consent
Utah	?	1935: 21	21	21	21
Vermont	?	21	1971: Lowered to 18	1986: Raised to 21	21
Virginia	?	21	1974: Lowered to 18: for beer and wine (21: for liquor remained)	1981: Raised to 19 for off-premises consumption 1983: Raised to 19 (all beer); 1985: Raised to 21	21
Washington	Age of majority since 1877	21	21	21	21
West Virginia	?	18: for beer and wine 21: for liquor	1972: Lowered to 18 (all)	1983: Raised to 19 (& 21 for non-residents); 1986: Raised to 21	21
Wisconsin	1839–1866: 18: for wine and liquor None: for beer Post-1866: 21 (all)	18: for beer 21: for wine and spirits 1957: 21: for residents of bordering states with age limit 21. 1963: Raised to 21 (off-premises beer sales, remained 18 for on-premises).	1972: Lowered to 18 (all) in 1972 (Mar); 1977: Border state restriction lifted.	1984: Raised to 19; 1986: Raised to 21 (September 1, 1986)	21 (however anyone can drink when a parent, guardian or spouse over 21 is present)
Wyoming	N/A	21	1973: Lowered to 19	1988: Raised to 21 in 1988 (Jul 1); Last state to raise de jure purchase age to 21	21
American Samoa	N/A	N/A	N/A	21	21
Northern Mariana Islands	–	–	N/A	21	21
Puerto Rico	N/A	18	18	Kept at 18 despite highway funding penalty under the National Minimum Drinking Age Act.	18
Virgin Islands	N/A	N/A	N/A	18	18
Guam	N/A	21	18	18	Raised to 21 in 2010

== Additional notes ==
- Contrary to popular belief, since the National Minimum Drinking Age Act, not all states specifically prohibit minors' and young adults' consumption of alcohol in private settings. That is because the federal law is concerned only with purchase and public possession, not private consumption, and contains several exceptions. As of January 1, 2007, 14 states and the District of Columbia ban underage consumption outright, 19 states do not specifically ban underage consumption outright, and 17 states have family member or location exceptions to their underage consumption laws. Federal law explicitly provides for religious, medical, employment and private clubs or establishments possession exceptions; as of 2005, 31 states have family member or location exceptions to their underage possession laws.
- In the 1960s the age for buying or drinking beer and wine in the District of Columbia (Washington, D.C.) was 18; the age for hard liquor was 21. Residents from Virginia and Maryland would often drive to D.C. to obtain alcohol. In Louisiana, the 1987 law raising the age from 18 to 21 was deliberately written solely to comply with the National Minimum Drinking Age Act to avoid losing highway funding, while still allowing 18- to 20-year-olds to drink as before. Not only did it still allow 18- to 20-year-olds to consume in private, it contained a major loophole allowing bars and stores to sell alcohol to 18- to 20-year-olds without penalty (despite purchase being technically illegal) which meant that the de facto age was still 18. In other words, the purchase age was 21 only on paper. This loophole was closed in 1995, but in 1996 the Louisiana Supreme Court declared a purchase age of 21 unconstitutional. That briefly lowered the de jure purchase age to 18, causing an uproar which prompted the Louisiana Supreme Court to reverse its decision, raising the age to 21 three months later. Other exceptions still remain to this day, including drinking in a private residence, and Louisiana still has some of the most liberal general alcohol laws of any state.
- Some states were "dry" well before national Prohibition was enacted in 1919, in some cases since achieving statehood. Also, some states did not become fully "wet" until several years after the repeal of Prohibition in 1933 (e.g. Mississippi in 1966). Since 1966, all states and territories of the USA have been "wet", but dry counties and towns still exist in some states.
