= Alcohol laws of South Carolina =

The alcohol laws of South Carolina are part of the state's history. Voters endorsed prohibition in 1892 but instead were given the "Dispensary System" of state-owned liquor stores. Currently, certain counties may enforce time restrictions for beer and wine sales in stores, although there are no dry counties in South Carolina.

== Prohibition ==
Prohibition was a major issue in the state's history. Voters endorsed prohibition in 1892 but instead were given the Dispensary System of state-owned liquor stores. They soon became symbols of political corruption controlled by Ben Tillman's machine and were shut down in 1907. Today, the retail sale of liquor statewide is permitted from 9 a.m. until 7 p.m. Monday–Saturday, and Sunday sales are banned by state law. However, counties and cities may hold referendums to allow Sunday sales of beer and wine only. Counties currently allowing Sunday beer and wine sales: Abbeville, Berkeley, Beaufort, Charleston, Darlington, Dorchester, Georgetown, Greenwood, Horry, McCormick, Newberry, Oconee, Richland (unincorporated areas only), and York. Lancaster and Lexington allow in cities with referendums. Cities and towns that have passed laws allowing Sunday beer and wine sales include Columbia, Spartanburg, Charleston, Greenville, Aiken, Rock Hill, Summerville, Santee, Daniel Island, Clemson, Hardeeville and Tega Cay.

== Varied stances ==
While there are no dry counties in South Carolina, and retail liquor sales are uniform statewide, certain counties may enforce time restrictions for beer and wine sales in stores (e.g., no sales after 2 a.m. in Pickens County) while others do not (in-store beer and wine sales are allowed 24 hours a day, 7 days a week in Charleston). Columbia, the state's capital, second largest city, and the home of the University of South Carolina, took one of the more relaxed stances on alcohol sales in bars compared to other cities in the state. Many bars, especially those catering to younger crowds in the busy Five Points district, served alcohol until sunrise, and it was not unheard of for bars and clubs to serve alcohol until 7 or 8 a.m., although the legality of this practice is questionable. In 2011, however, Columbia City Council voted to force bars to close at 2 a.m., requiring a special permit to stay open further. Requirements for the permit involved having trained security staff and no events that violate "the public peace" (wet T-shirt contests, etc.). In Greenville city limits, it is illegal to serve alcohol after 2 a.m. at bars and restaurants.

== Minibottles ==
Before 2006, South Carolina was infamous amongst tourists and residents alike for being the last state in the nation to require cocktails and liquor drinks to be mixed using minibottles, like those found on airplanes, instead of from free-pour bottles. The original logic behind this law was twofold: it made alcohol taxation simpler and allowed bar patrons to receive a standardized amount of alcohol in each drink. However, minibottles contain 1.75 oz (52 ml) of alcohol, approximately 30% more than the typical 1.2 oz (35 ml) found in free-pour drinks, with the obvious result of overly strong cocktails and inebriated bar customers. The law was changed in 2006 to allow both free-pour and minibottles in bars, and the vast majority of bars quickly eschewed minibottles in favor of free-pour.
