= Alcohol laws of North Dakota =

The alcohol laws of North Dakota include the following provisions.

- A person must be 21 to purchase or consume alcohol.
- It is illegal to drive with a blood alcohol level over 0.08%.
- Public Intoxication is not a crime.
- Grocery stores, gas stations, and supermarkets may carry all forms of liquor, but only if the liquor is rung up in a separate enclosed part of the store.
- Alcohol may not be served between 2am and 8am Mon-Sat. Alcohol may be served and sold on Sundays 8am to 12am. SB 2220
- Alcohol may not be sold on Thanksgiving Day (after 2 am), Christmas Eve (after 6 pm) or Christmas Day (all day).
