= Alcohol laws of Utah =

Location of Utah

The alcohol laws of Utah regulate the selling and purchasing of alcohol in the U.S. state of Utah and are some of the most restrictive in the United States. A person must be 21 years old or older to buy or consume alcohol. The Utah Department of Alcoholic Beverage Services (UDABS) has regulated the sale of alcoholic beverages since 1935, two years after the end of Prohibition. Utah is one of seventeen control states, meaning the state has a monopoly over the wholesaling and/or retailing of some or all categories of alcoholic beverages.

Current Utah law sets a limit of 4.0 percent alcohol by weight (5% ABV) in beer sold at grocery and convenience stores and at establishments operating under a "beer only" type license, such as taverns, beer bars and some restaurants. Beer over 4.0 percent by weight (5% ABV) is available in State Liquor Stores and Package Agencies and at clubs and restaurants licensed to sell liquor.

In commercial facilities, the time at which alcohol may be served is limited, and alcohol may not be sold any later than 1:00 a.m. under any circumstance.

== Background ==
The Church of Jesus Christ of Latter-day Saints, to which 55% of Utah residents belong, advises against the consumption of alcohol for its members in the Word of Wisdom given in the Doctrine and Covenants. Because of this traditional LDS teaching and the large population of Latter-day Saints in Utah, the alcohol laws of Utah have generally been strict. However, several attempts to make Utah a dry state also failed, and due to a need to address violence caused by bootlegging, on December 5, 1933, the 21 members of the Utah delegation to the constitutional convention unanimously cast the 36th deciding state vote to repeal the Eighteenth Amendment and ratify the Twenty-first Amendment, thus repealing national alcohol prohibition.

Since 1935, Utah's liquor industry (all except 4.0% beer) has been controlled through state-run liquor store outlets.

=== Zion curtains ===
Zion curtains was a nickname (adapted from Iron Curtain) for partitions unique to Utah restaurants that separate restaurant bartenders preparing alcoholic drinks from the customers who order them. The partitions are mandated for restaurants with "Limited-Service Restaurant Licenses" and "Full-Service Restaurant Licenses". These partitions are often made of frosted glass since they are required to be "solid, translucent, [and] permanent". They were mandated in hopes of combating excessive drinking by keeping alcohol out of sight of restaurant patrons who choose not to consume alcohol. In the spring 2017 legislative session, the Zion Curtain laws were reformed.

==== Zion Curtain reform ====
Legislation enacted in 2010 restored the barriers as part of a broader compromise on alcohol reform; in 2013, the Utah legislature considered legislation removing the barriers permanently from all establishments, although the legislation ultimately did not pass.

Abolishing the Zion curtains was an often proposed and contentious issue affecting Utah politics for years. Many restaurants feel it introduces one more hardship in a state with too many alcohol restrictions, while others feel like it is a much-needed instrument to protect children and teens from exposure to alcohol consumption. A new bill, HB 339, was introduced that would allow restaurant owners to abolish their Zion curtain provided the owners established a separate bar area that would not be accessible to anyone under the age of 21.

Lawmakers insist that a wall or partition obscuring any alcoholic beverages from view helps to shield children and teens from the glamorization of alcohol. Jim Fell, a research scientist with the Pacific Institute for Research and Evaluation, points out that "... no research has been conducted to establish whether there is any actual benefit to this law's implementation. Exposure to alcohol does have an effect on teen drinking, but I worry that the multimedia, including alcohol advertising, would overwhelm any effects that the Utah law might have," said Fell. "It's important to evaluate this — but it would have to be done by an independent, objective researcher, not someone who is an advocate or who opposes the law."

In 2017, another bill, HB 442, was passed that took down the requirement of the Zion Curtain in restaurants, but initially replaced it with a rule that created a minimum 10-foot distance from the location where the alcoholic drinks were prepared and tables where people under the age of 21 could be seated. It also required signage on restaurants and bars that clearly stated at the entrance that "This premise is licensed as a restaurant, not a bar" or vice versa. As part of the changes included in HB 442, it removed the "Dining Club license" that allowed restaurants with the license to serve alcohol without the "intent to dine" clause used in the standard restaurant liquor license, with existing dining club licensees required to choose to be either a restaurant or a bar by July 1, 2018. However, there was push back from restaurant owners for the odd signs they had to use stating they were not a bar, owners in small facilities where there is not enough space in the establishment to meet the 10-foot requirement, and existing dining club establishments that would need to remodel their business practices to be either a bar (where no one under 21 is allowed) or the sales restrictions of a restaurant (where patrons must have "intent to dine" and all sales come from less than 30% alcohol sales). In March 2018, legislature revamped the bill again removing the requirement for restaurants to use the "not a bar" signs.

=== 2002 Winter Olympic Games ===
During the 2002 Winter Olympic Games, the Department of Alcoholic Beverage Control (UDABC) relaxed enforcement of Utah's alcohol laws. This led to the passing of less restrictive laws effected in May 2003. This came after complaints, particularly after an incident in which an International Olympic Committee official complained.

=== 2009 efforts for reform ===
Governor Jon Huntsman, Jr. (in office 2005–2009), a member of The Church of Jesus Christ of Latter-day Saints, was a proponent for less restrictive alcohol laws during his time in office. He believed reform would be favorable to the state's tourism industry. He signed legislation allowing existing restaurants to remove the partitions, although future restaurants would be required to prepare alcoholic drinks outside of their patron's immediate view. Effective in June 2009, bars and clubs were no longer required to charge a cover, or a membership fee, making liquor more accessible to tourists and locals.

Even though homebrewing of beer and wine had been popular for many years in Utah, with multiple retail and even wholesale outlets for purchasing supplies, and ingredients, there was no law forbidding it or allowing it on the books. In March 2009, homebrewing for the citizens of the state was formally made legal.

== Current Utah laws ==
Utah laws restrict supermarkets operating within the state to only sell packaged beer up to 5.0% ABV (or 4.0% alcohol by weight); beer containing alcohol greater than this amount (as well as liquor and wine) can only be sold at state-controlled liquor stores. On November 1, 2019, the law increased the permitted ABV in beers to 5.0% (or 4.0% alcohol by weight) after passing Utah SB 132 in March 2019. The bill initially proposed a 4.8% ABV, but received push back from local breweries as the arbitrary limit seemed to favor the major national brands.

Bars, clubs, taverns, and other establishments selling in-house or "on premise" alcohol (excluding restaurants) are allowed to sell alcohol from 10:00am – 1:00am. Locations defined as a restaurant under Utah law require that any alcohol be ordered along with food (though they do not have to be ordered at the same time), and can sell alcohol from 11:30am – 1:00am. Restaurant liquor licenses also require the establishment to have less than 30% of all sales be alcohol.

On March 8, 2013, the Utah legislature passed a law allowing restaurant patrons to order alcohol before ordering food after a controversial series of citations was issued to several restaurants.

In February 2025, the Utah legislature passed HB 437, which allows courts to prohibit alcohol sales to people who are convicted of "extreme" DUI ("interdicted person"), and mandates stricter ID verification rules (known as "100% ID") to enforce this provision. Beginning January 1, 2026, anyone who purchases alcohol must present a valid photo ID with no exception, removing the previous exemption to ID checks for people who clearly appeared to be over the age of 35. Valid photo ID includes state-issued identification or driver's license cards (excluding driving privilege cards), passports, and military IDs with a photo and date of birth. Interdicted persons will be issued state identification cards marked with a red stripe reading "NO ALCOHOL SALE": businesses must visually inspect IDs to check for this marker, and must not furnish alcohol sales to interdicted persons.

=== Drunk driving ===
In 1983, Utah was the first state to lower its statewide blood alcohol content (BAC) limit for operating a vehicle to 0.08% from the standard 0.10%. On December 30, 2018, Utah became the first state to further lower its limit to 0.05% BAC.

== Public opinion ==
A 2014 poll through UtahPolicy.com found 62 percent of Utahns were in favor of removing the requirement that new restaurants install Zion curtains to hide the preparation of alcoholic beverages from consumers. Thirty-one percent opposed such a change.

== Economic impact ==
Utah is growing at a moderate growth rate and has unemployment below 4%, with fairly large gains in the tech industry. Many new companies have located in Utah due to their friendly business practices. According to the Governor's Economic report, liquor sales have risen 7.9% in 2014, "as consumption, demographic patterns, and economic factors combined to push sales up". "Travel research firm TNS Global, reported total Utah person trips during the first six months of 2014 had increased an estimated 12 percent from 2013, with an 18 percent increase in nonresident visitors. Similarly, during the first three quarters of 2014, total visits to Utah's five national parks and places had increased 10 percent from the previous year."

=== Business and tourism ===
No cost analysis research has been done by the state of Utah to determine if Utah's liquor laws have affected Utah's business, economic growth, or tourism industry. Businesses who have chosen to expand or relocate their businesses in other states appear to be mostly alcohol related.

=== Grocery stores ===
Trader Joe's, which began in California as a convenience store that started selling wine, did not open its first store in Utah until 2012. The store's founder, Joe Coulombe, said, "We built Trader Joe's on wine first, then food." A cornerstone of their store's sales are beer, wine, and in some cases liquor. Due to Utah's stringent liquor laws, alcoholic beverages initially were not stocked in the Salt Lake City store. Some theorize that Utah's strict liquor laws, and the inevitable impact on the store's margin, was responsible for Trader Joe's late entry into the Salt Lake City market.

=== Conventions ===
Scott Beck, president and CEO of Visit Salt Lake, says perception is the problem Utah has in attracting tourism, specifically conventions. His company tracks business that is lost, and Beck says it is a considerable amount of lost revenue. Scott says "We are told there are not enough restaurants and nightlife to keep the visitors occupied outside of the convention, because they can't get a drink. We call it nightlife, but we're not talking about nightlife in terms of strip clubs and gaming; we're talking about nightlife like Gracie's or nightlife like The Bayou—places where visitors can network or socialize with their friends and peers. But our liquor laws create a sense, and in some cases a reality, that you can't do that in Utah. And we lose hundreds of millions of dollars a year in delegate spending because of that perception."

Bruce Fery, CEO of The Grand America Hotel and Resorts and also a proponent of alcohol "normalization" in Utah, said, "From a guest service perspective, Utah's liquor laws are really awkward and make us look like we are still in covered wagons. Utah's liquor laws make us appear to be inhospitable." He also cites many instances where out-of-towners were befuddled, put off, or downright angry at the policies that are in place to keep in accordance of the law.

=== Restaurants ===
Unlike grocery stores, restaurants are able to apply for a license to sell and serve liquor, wine, flavored malt beverages, and heavy beer (over 4.0%). Limited restaurant licenses may not sell flavored malt beverages or distilled spirits. And while the restaurant may be able to obtain a liquor license, they are restricted to how and when they are able to serve alcohol. One such restriction is the "intent to dine" law; customers must have the intent to dine in order to be served an alcoholic beverage. Restaurants are only able to serve liquor from 11AM-midnight or 1AM, depending on the license, and many times the amount per glass is restricted. This creates problems with customers from out of town. Co-owner of Fratelli Ristorante, Dave Cannell, said, "People from out of state ask for a 'real' glass of wine and I can't give them one … I can only give them 5oz per glass".

==== Chain restaurants ====
Casual restaurants like Chili's and Applebee's have had to spend extra money on reconfiguring their restaurants' layouts in order to accommodate the laws and hide alcohol from view. Ruth's Chris, which has a large contingent of out-of-town businesspeople who are used to ordering alcoholic drinks after work, have to inform their patrons of laws requiring that no more than 1.5 oz. of alcohol be poured into any drink and that an order of a food item is also required. Out-of-state restaurants that rely heavily on brunch revenue would suffer due to the ban on bloody marys and mimosas before 12 p.m.

Many chains fear they would face unfair competition and costs when going head-to-head with restaurants that are grandfathered in and not required to have the zion curtain installed. Restaurants that did not have zion curtains before May 12, 2009, are not required to build them, giving owners with those licenses a "grandfathered" bar structure. Any modification to the existing structure would result in the loss of the grandfathering. Hersh Ipaktchian, founder of Iggy's Sports Grill, says that factoring in costs to change floor plans would make it difficult and more expensive for him to expand. He indicated that he is looking for options to expand outside of the state of Utah. The Porcupine Pub and Grille also reported intent to expand outside of the state due to Utah's stringent and precarious liquor laws.

=== Breweries ===
Epic Brewing Company chose to expand in Colorado with a $2 to $3 million dollar facility instead of Utah due to Utah's constantly changing liquor laws. "Who knows ... what things they'll dream up next to punish an industry that pays millions of millions of taxes in this state," David Cole said. While he predicts state laws will eventually change, "It's going to change a lot slower than we are as a company."
