= Magruder's =

American grocery chain

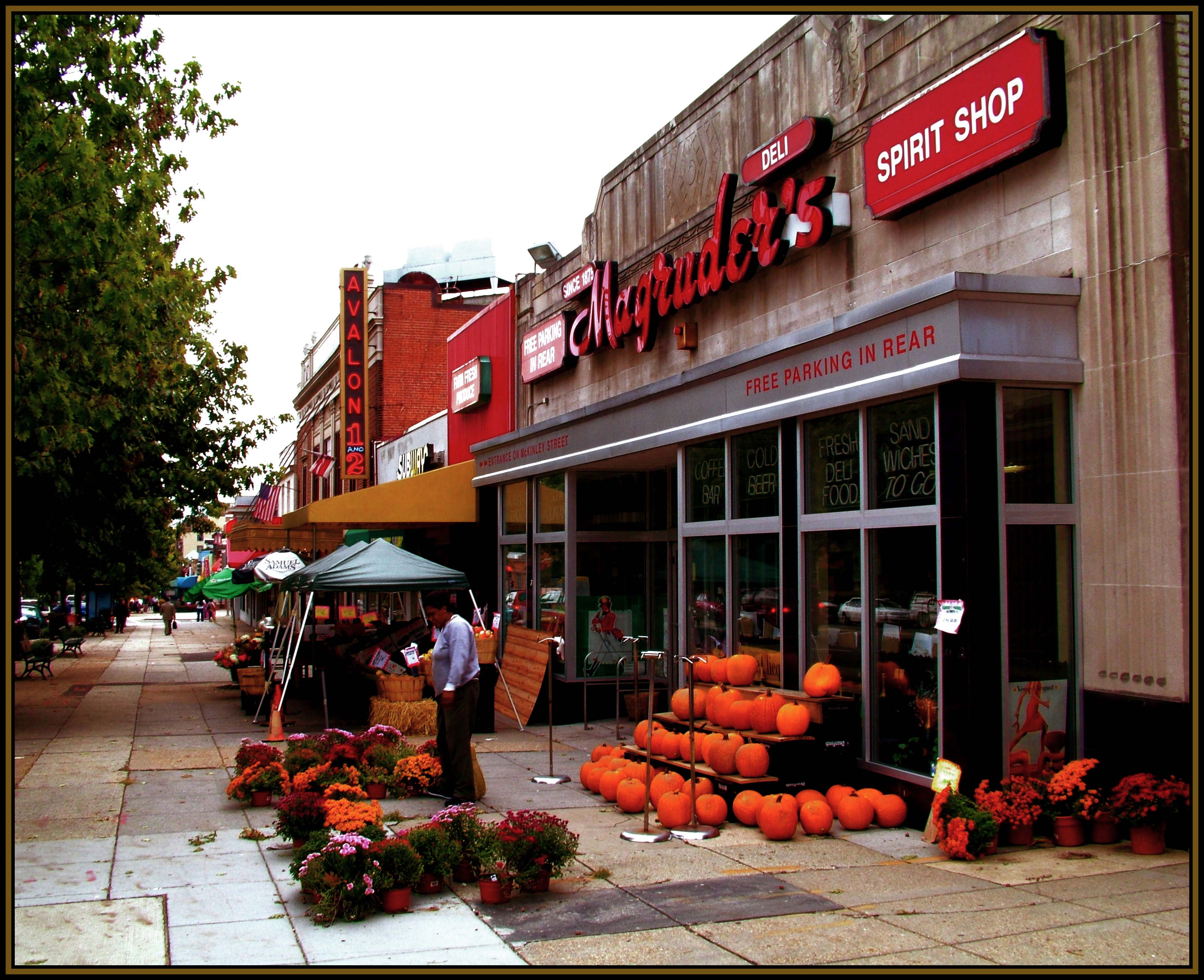
- Magruder's Chevy Chase location in 2005
- Founded: 1875; 151 years ago Washington, D.C., U.S.
- Founder: John Magruder
- Headquarters: Washington, D.C., U.S.
- Area served: Washington metropolitan area
- Website: https://www.magrudersofdc.com/

Magruder's is a grocery store and former chain in and around the Washington, D.C. metropolitan area, founded in 1875.

== History ==
In 1875, John H. Magruder purchased the grocery store at 1417 New York Avenue NW, Washington, D.C. where he had worked for ten years. Some, including the owners since 2013, claim a link to "Commodore John Magruder", presumably Confederate general John B. Magruder.

The store is owned by a family who were born and grew up in the Washington area. In 2006, Magruder's removed their loyalty cards, allowing regular customers to save money on purchases. In 2009, stores located in Cleveland Park, Annandale and Falls Church closed.

In January 2013, Magruder's sold its Chevy Chase Connecticut Avenue store, which continues to operate under the Magruder's name as the sole flagship location. It also began liquidation sales at its other four stores, in Alexandria, Gaithersburg, Rockville and Vienna.
