= Alcohol laws of Nevada =

There are few restrictions on the sale and consumption of alcohol in Nevada except for age.

== Production ==
=== Breweries ===
Breweries have regained popularity in the state since brewpubs were legalized in 1993. As of 2014, beer manufacturers pay $0.16 per gallon in taxes to the state.

=== Distilleries ===
Legalized distilling was formalized with the passage of AB159, which set standards for producing and distributing spirits in the state. Craft distillers are limited to selling 10,000 cases in the state and 20,000 cases exported per annum. Liquor cannot be sold directly to consumers, and must first be sold to a distributor. Samples at distilleries are limited to two ounces per person per day and sales are limited to two bottles per person per month. As of 2014, spirit manufacturers pay between $0.70 and $3.60 per gallon in taxes to the state, depending on the alcohol by volume.

=== Wineries ===
State law restricts commercially operated wineries to counties with no more than 100,000 people. Instructional wine-making facilities may operate in any county but must meet special license requirements and are restricted to selling or distributing no more than 60 gallons of wine in any 12-month period.

== Consumption ==
=== Open containers ===
While there are no statewide open container laws, local ordinances usually prohibit open consumption. Plastic and paper open containers are allowed on the Las Vegas Strip and the Fremont Street Experience if the alcohol was purchased from a casino.

=== Public intoxication ===
State law renders public intoxication legal, and explicitly prohibits any local or state law from making it a public offense on the strip.

=== Dry municipalities ===
Alcohol purchase is only controlled in Panaca.
