= Youth in the United States =

Youth is an age group in the demographics of the United States. This group of young people in the United States are privileged to have multiple opportunities which they can take advantage of to have a bright and better future. However, there are also many concerns about the youth in the United States. In the 2010 United States census, 20.2% of the total population were 0–14 years old (30,305,704 females and 31,639,127 males).

== Concerns from parents ==
According to a survey of parents in 2011, the issues of greatest concern about children are as follows, with percentages of adults who rate each item as a "big problem":

1. Childhood obesity: 33%
2. Drug abuse: 33%
3. Tobacco smoking: 25%
4. Teen pregnancy: 24%
5. Bullying: 24%
6. Internet safety: 23%
7. Stress: 22%
8. Alcohol abuse: 20%
9. Driving accidents: 20%
10. Sexting: 20%

== Sexuality ==
Adolescent sexuality in the United States relates to the sexuality of American adolescents and its place in American society, both in terms of their feelings, behaviors and development and in terms of the response of the government, educators and interested groups. There have been several concerns with youth sexuality specially when they are sexually active without the proper care and guidance. Teen pregnancy is very common in the United States, but it also has problems with it. Teen pregnancy most of the time experience perinatal outcomes. These outcomes also appear to have high blood pressure, infection in the uterus, sexually transmitted infections and more. Teen pregnancies have a high risk of negative birth outcomes compared with adult individuals.

== Youth rights ==
The National Youth Rights Association is the primary youth rights organization in the United States, with local chapters across the country and constant media exposure. The organization known as Americans for a Society Free from Age Restrictions is also an important organization. The Freechild Project has gained a reputation for interjecting youth rights issues into organizations historically focused on youth development and youth service through their consulting and training activities. The Global Youth Action Network engages young people around the world in advocating for youth rights, and Peacefire provides technology-specific support for youth rights activists.

Choose Responsibility and their successor organization, the Amethyst Initiative, founded by Dr. John McCardell Jr., exist to promote the discussion of the drinking age, specifically. Choose Responsibility focuses on promoting a legal drinking age of 18, but includes provisions such as education and licensing. The Amethyst Initiative, a collaboration of college presidents and other educators, focuses on discussion and examination of the drinking age, with specific attention paid to the culture of alcohol as it exists on college campuses and the negative impact of the drinking age on alcohol education and responsible drinking.

== Youth politics ==
With roots in the early youth activism of the newsboys and Mother Jones' child labor protests at the turn of the 20th century, youth politics were first identified in American politics with the formation of the American Youth Congress in the 1930s. In the 1950s and 1960s organizations such as the Student Nonviolent Coordinating Committee and Students for a Democratic Society were closely associated with youth politics, despite the broad social statements of documents including the liberal Port Huron Statement and the conservative Sharon Statement and leaders such as Martin Luther King Jr.

Our answer is the world's hope; it is to rely on youth. The cruelties and obstacles of this swiftly changing planet will not yield to obsolete dogmas and outworn slogans. It cannot be moved by those who cling to a present which is already dying, who prefer the illusion of security to the excitement of danger. It demands the qualities of youth: not a time of life but a state of mind, a temper of the will, a quality of the imagination, a predominance of courage over timidity, of the appetite for adventure over the love of ease. - Robert F. Kennedy, South Africa, 6-6-1966

=== Youth vote ===
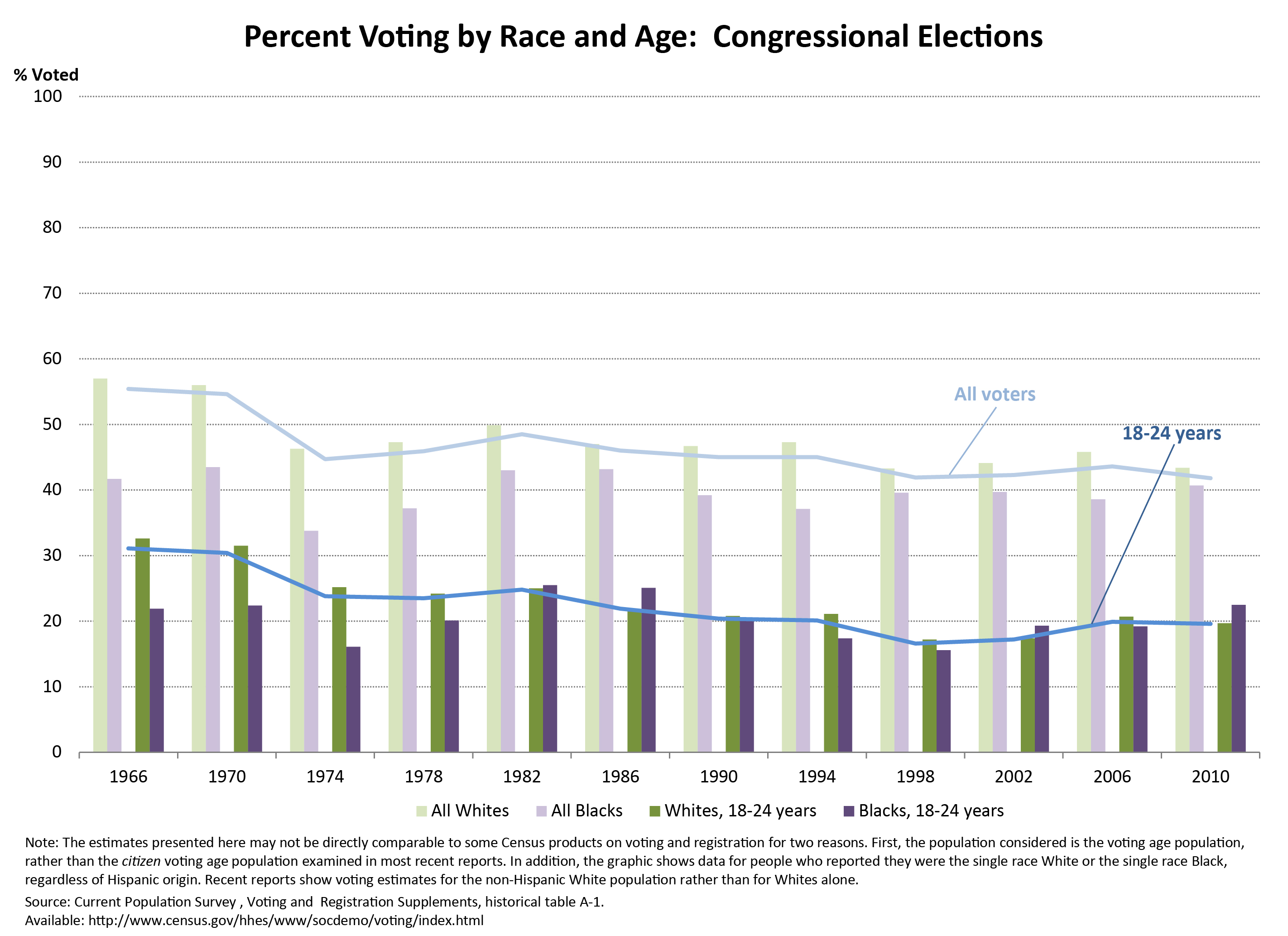
Congressional voting trends by race and age in the United States, 1966–2010

The youth vote in the United States is the cohort of 18–24 year-olds as a voting demographic, though some scholars define youth voting as voters under 30. Many policy areas specifically affect the youth of the United States, such as education issues and the juvenile justice system; however, young people also care about issues that affect the population as a whole, such as national debt and war.

Young people have the lowest turnout, though as the individual ages, turnout increases to a peak at the age of 50 and then falls again. Ever since 18-year-olds were given the right to vote in 1971 through the 26th Amendment to the Constitution, youth have been under represented at the polls as of 2003. In 1976, one of the first elections in which 18-year-olds were able to vote, 18–24 year-olds made up 18 percent of all eligible voters in America, but only 13 percent of the actual voters – an under-representation of one-third. In the next election in 1978, youth were under-represented by 50 percent. "Seven out of ten young people…did not vote in the 1996 presidential election… 20 percent below the general turnout." In 1998, out of the 13 percent of eligible youth voters in America, only five percent voted. During the competitive presidential race of 2000, 36 percent of youth turned out to vote and in 2004, the "banner year in the history of youth voting," 47 percent of the American youth voted. In the Democratic primaries for the 2008 U.S. presidential election, the number of youth voters tripled and even quadrupled in some states compared to the 2004 elections. In 2008, Barack Obama spoke about the contributions of young people to his election campaign outside of just voter turnout.

== Mental health ==
According to the National Institute of Mental Health, approximately 46% of American adolescents aged 13–18 will suffer from some form of mental disorder. About 21% will suffer from a disorder that is categorized as "severe," meaning that the disorder impairs their daily functioning, but almost two-thirds of these adolescents will not receive formal mental health support. According to the World Health Organization, physical, emotional, and social problems such as poverty, abuse, or violence cause students to be vulnerable to mental health illnesses. An estimated one in seven (14.3%) of 10- to 19-year-olds experience mental health conditions that remain unrecognized and untreated. The most common types of disorders among adolescents as reported by the NIMH is anxiety disorders (including generalized anxiety disorder, phobias, post-traumatic stress disorder, obsessive-compulsive disorder, and others), with a lifetime prevalence of about 25% in youth aged 13–18 and 6% of those cases being categorized as severe. Next are mood disorders (major depressive disorder, dysthymic disorder, and/or bipolar disorder), with a lifetime prevalence of 14% and 4.7% for severe cases in adolescents. A similarly common disorder is attention deficit hyperactivity disorder (ADHD), which is categorized as a childhood disorder but oftentimes carries through into adolescence and adulthood. The prevalence for ADHD in American adolescents is 9%, and 1.8% for severe cases. It is important to understand that ADHD is a serious issue in not only children but adults. When children have ADHD a number of mental illnesses can come from that which can affect their education and hold them back from succeeding.

According to Mental Health America, more than 10% of young people exhibit symptoms of depression strong enough to severely undermine their ability to function at school, at home, or whilst managing relationships.

A 2021 study conducted by NIMH managed to link 31.4% of suicide deaths to a mental health disorder, the most common ones being attention-deficit/hyperactivity disorder (ADHD) or depression. Suicide was the second leading cause of death among persons aged 10–29 years in the United States during 2011–2019. More teenagers and young adults die from suicide than cancer, heart disease, AIDS, birth defects, stroke, pneumonia, influenza, and chronic lung disease combined. There are an average of over 3,470 attempts by students in grades 9–12.

According to APA, the percentage of students seeking college mental health counselling has been rising in recent years. With anxiety as the most common factor, depression as the second, stress as the third, family issues as the fourth, and academic performance and relationship problems as the fifth and sixth.

== Juvenile delinquency ==
Juvenile delinquency in the United States refers to crimes committed by children or young people, particularly those under the age of eighteen (or seventeen in some states).

Juvenile delinquency has been the focus of much attention since the 1950s from academics, policymakers and lawmakers. Research is mainly focused on the causes of juvenile delinquency and which strategies have successfully diminished crime rates among the youth. Though the causes are debated and controversial, much of the debate revolves around the punishment and rehabilitation of juveniles in a youth detention center or elsewhere.

== Child support ==
In the United States, child support is the ongoing obligation for a periodic payment made by an "obligor" (or paying parent or payer) to an "obligee" (or receiving party or recipient) for the financial care and support of children of a relationship or a (possibly terminated) marriage. The laws governing this kind of obligation vary dramatically state-by-state and tribe-by-tribe among Native Americans. Each individual state and federally recognized tribe is responsible for developing its own guidelines for determining child support.

Typically the obligor is a non-custodial parent. Typically the obligee is a custodial parent, caregiver or guardian, or a government agency, and does not have to spend the money on the child. In the U.S., there is no gender requirement for child support; for example, a father may pay a mother or a mother may pay a father. In addition, where there is joint custody, in which the child has two custodial parents and no non-custodial parents, a custodial parent may be required to pay the other custodial parent.

Today, the federal child support enforcement program is the responsibility of the Office of Child Support Enforcement, an office of Administration for Children and Families in the Department of Health and Human Services. Federal regulations promulgated pursuant to Title IV-D of the Social Security Act require uniform application of child support guidelines throughout a state, but each state can determine its own method of calculating support. At a minimum, 45 CFR 302.56 requires each state to establish and publish a Guideline that is presumptively (but rebuttably) correct, and review the guideline, at a minimum, every four years. Most states have therefore adopted their own "Child Support Guidelines Worksheet" which local courts and state Child Support Enforcement Offices use for determining the "standard calculation" of child support in that state. Courts may choose to deviate from this standard calculation in any particular case. The US has reciprocal agreements with a number of countries regarding recovery of child support and is a party to the Hague Maintenance Convention 2007.

== Child labor ==
Child labor laws in the United States address issues related to the employment and welfare of working children in the United States. The most sweeping federal law that restricts the employment and abuse of child workers is the Fair Labor Standards Act of 1938 (FLSA), which came into force during the Franklin D. Roosevelt administration. Child labor provisions under FLSA are designed to protect the educational opportunities of youth and prohibit their employment in jobs that are detrimental to their health and safety. FLSA restricts the hours that youth under 16 years of age can work and lists hazardous occupations too dangerous for young workers to perform.

== Youth unemployment ==
In the United States, the issue of youth unemployment intersects with racial inequalities, resulting in a more complex crisis. There is more pronouncedly high youth unemployment in inner cities of urban areas with high concentrations of poverty, which intersect with high racial minority populations. In particular, young Black men are the most vulnerable to youth unemployment. The 1965 Moynihan report, published by Daniel Patrick Moynihan, predicted that youth unemployment among young Black men would only continue to increase. This prediction remained accurate throughout the 90s and through to the 2000s as well. Moynihan attributed this high unemployment to several factors, including employers' reluctance to hire young Black men due to negative stereotypes as well as issues related to low skill levels, delinquency, and a general sense of discouragement toward pursuing employment or higher education among young Black men.

There are many causes of youth unemployment, and even more emerge when the issue is viewed through the lens of race relations. In some cities in the United States, geographic disparities related to urbanization and spatially concentrated poverty have exacerbated the unemployment crisis. This issue became more pronounced following the suburbanization of American cities, marked by the migration of middle and high-income (disproportionately white) families to suburbs on the periphery outside the urban core.

In 2007, before the Great Recession began in the United States, youth unemployment was already at 13%. By 2008, this rate had jumped to 18% and in 2010 it had climbed to just under 21%. The length of time the youth were unemployed expanded compared to prior recessions. Many youth in the United States remained unemployed after more than 12 months of searching for a job. This has caused the emergence of a scarred generation. An estimated 9.4 million young people aged 16 to 24 in the United States, that is 12.3%, were neither working nor in school.

As of July 2017, approximately 20.9 million young people aged 16 to 24 were employed in the United States. However, youth unemployment remained at 9.6%, a decrease of 1.9% compared to July 2016. The unemployment rates within this group varied: young men faced a 10.1% unemployment rate, while young women had a slightly lower rate of 9.1%. In terms of ethnicity, the unemployment rate for young whites was 8.0%, for young blacks it was 16.2%, for young Asians it was 9.9%, and for young Hispanics, it was 10.1%. By August 2020, youth unemployment had risen to 14.7%, reflecting the economic impact of the COVID-19 pandemic. However, by August 2024, young workers began to see significant wage increases. In response to difficulties in filling job vacancies, businesses raised wages for teenage workers by 36%, with the average hourly pay reaching $15.68. This wage boost helped attract more young people into the workforce, contributing to a reduction in youth unemployment.

== See also ==
- History of childhood in the United States, for youth before 2010.
- Adolescent and young adult oncology
- Demographics of the United States
- Education in the United States
  - History of education in the United States
- American family structure
- Child poverty in the United States
- Youth incarceration in the United States
- Street children in the United States
- Childhood obesity in the United States
- Boy
- Girl

Other countries:

- Category:Youth by country
