= Alcohol consumption by youth in the United States =

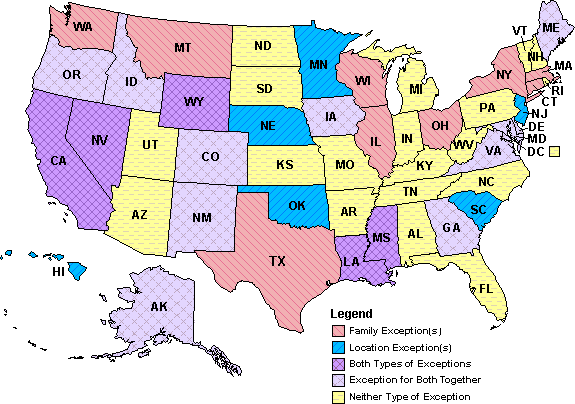
Exceptions to Minimum Age of 21 for Consumption of Alcohol as of 2007

Although the minimum legal age to purchase alcohol is 21 in all U.S. states and most territories, the legal details for consumption vary greatly. Although some states prohibit alcohol usage for people under 18, the majority have exceptions that permit consumption.

Underage drinking has become an activity primarily done in secrecy. In what is known as pre-gaming or pre-partying, underage drinkers may hide their alcohol consumption by drinking quickly before they go out. Brittany Levine explained in her article "Pre-Gaming" in USA Today that "of all drinking events involving pre-partying, 80% involved additional drinking afterward," and that pre-partying is involved in approximately 45% of all drinking events.

== Drinking age ==
Most states decided on 21 as the drinking age after Prohibition, but the 26th Amendment allowed individuals 18 and older to vote and serve in the military, so several states lowered the drinking age as well. However, President Ronald Reagan, influenced by groups such as Mothers Against Drunk Driving (MADD) and Remove Intoxicated Drivers (RID), decided to federally establish a 21+ drinking age by signing the National Minimum Drinking Age Act of 1984. He believed that doing so would decrease the number of crashes related to drunk driving, because, he claimed, states with a drinking age of 21+ did not have as many drunk driving crashes. Reagan said that although he wished states would create their own legislation to increase the drinking age, a federal law had to be implemented to avoid blood borders, or teenagers driving to the nearest state with a lower drinking age. Reagan threatened states with withholding 5% of federal funding for highways if they did not comply with increasing the drinking age to 21.

In 2007, the drinking age debate in the United States was renewed when nonprofit organization Choose Responsibility began promoting the lowering of the drinking age coupled with education and rules to persuade people to drink responsibly before they are of legal age. Before one is eligible to buy, possess and consume alcohol, an alcohol education class must be completed in its entirety and each teen must pass a final examination before licensing can occur. If a teen has any alcohol-related law violations before they turn 18, including a zero-tolerance DUI triggered by a BAC of 0.01% or higher, they will face a minimum one-year delay per violation before becoming eligible to be licensed.

In 2008, McCardell and the presidents of over 100 U.S. colleges and universities launched the Amethyst Initiative, a campaign to debate the effectiveness of present alcohol laws. In 2008, Gallup reported that 77% of the population over 18 oppose the 18-year drinking age. As it stands, any state that lowers its alcohol purchase or possession age would lose five percent of its federal highway funding. This could range from a $6 million–150 million loss for any single state.

== Prevention programs ==
According to Frances M. Harding of the Substance Abuse and Mental Health Services Administration's (SAMHSA) Center for Substance Abuse Prevention, "Our target is to change social norms."

=== Brief Alcohol Screening and Intervention for College Students ===
The Brief Alcohol Screening and Intervention for College Students (BASICS) program consists of a brief survey given to students to help them assess their alcohol usage against other students. It also consists of one or two counseling sessions granted to the students to provide support and not be confrontational regarding their alcohol use.

=== "Talk. They Hear You" ===
The Substance Abuse and Mental Health Services Administration created the "Talk. They Hear You" campaign in 2013 that involved a mobile app, and to assist parents with having conversations about alcohol usage to their children, the "Talk. They Hear You" campaign was expanded in 2017 to cover drugs and underage drinking

== Motivations ==
To summarize the motivations for underage drinking, cultural norms allow underage drinking while social pressures facilitate them. Although the legal drinking age is set at 21, drinking at age 18 or upon entrance into college is the culturally accepted limit. This cultural permission is the primary reason many college students ignore laws concerning drinking. In addition to cultural motivations, students are socially expected to drink. Many social gatherings are centered on drinking. Furthermore, besides feeling the need to drink in order to be accepted, alcohol intoxication provides students who may be shy or feel out of their element with enough liquid courage to enjoy themselves. Another major factor is for adolescents who grew up in households where drinking was common, encouraged, or provided to them. One study from 2005 showed that 26% of adults think underage drinking is okay if an adult is present.

Those that are for lowering the drinking age generally argue that the moderate consumption of alcohol frequently as a complement to a meal or drink with friends is preferable to and healthier than the binge drinking habits more often associated with dry countries such as the United States. These opinions generally lead to the argument that it is far more effective and beneficial for laws to monitor, limit, and guide healthy drinking habits rather than to outright ban it. Furthermore, it is argued that alcohol misuse occurs—at least in part—as a result of the stringent drinking laws. It is said that if a drinking age weren't strictly enforced and people below the age of 18 had opportunities to learn how to drink responsibility before college, fewer teenagers would misuse alcohol. Dwight B. Heath, a Professor at Brown points out the ‘forbidden fruit’ syndrome that is created when the drinking age is so high. In contrast, in countries with low drinking ages, "Alcohol has no mystique. It's no big deal.” Many of these proponents also argue that instead of there being a strict age limit, laws should be more gradual with suggestions such as having to take a test to get licensed to drink or implementing laws such as those in Europe that limit the type of alcohols or the setting under which they may be consumed.

Those who argue for maintaining and even strengthening current drinking laws, however, citing past examples, generally argue that injuries and deaths related to drinking are bad enough presently. They also argue that initiatives to implement gradual drinking laws or educational programs are optimistic and unrealistic. Furthermore, they propose that drinking and driving related problems are rampant enough among those who are not legally of age and that lowering the drinking age would only enable these habits further, causing an even higher volume of alcohol-related problems.

== Statistics ==
=== Rates ===
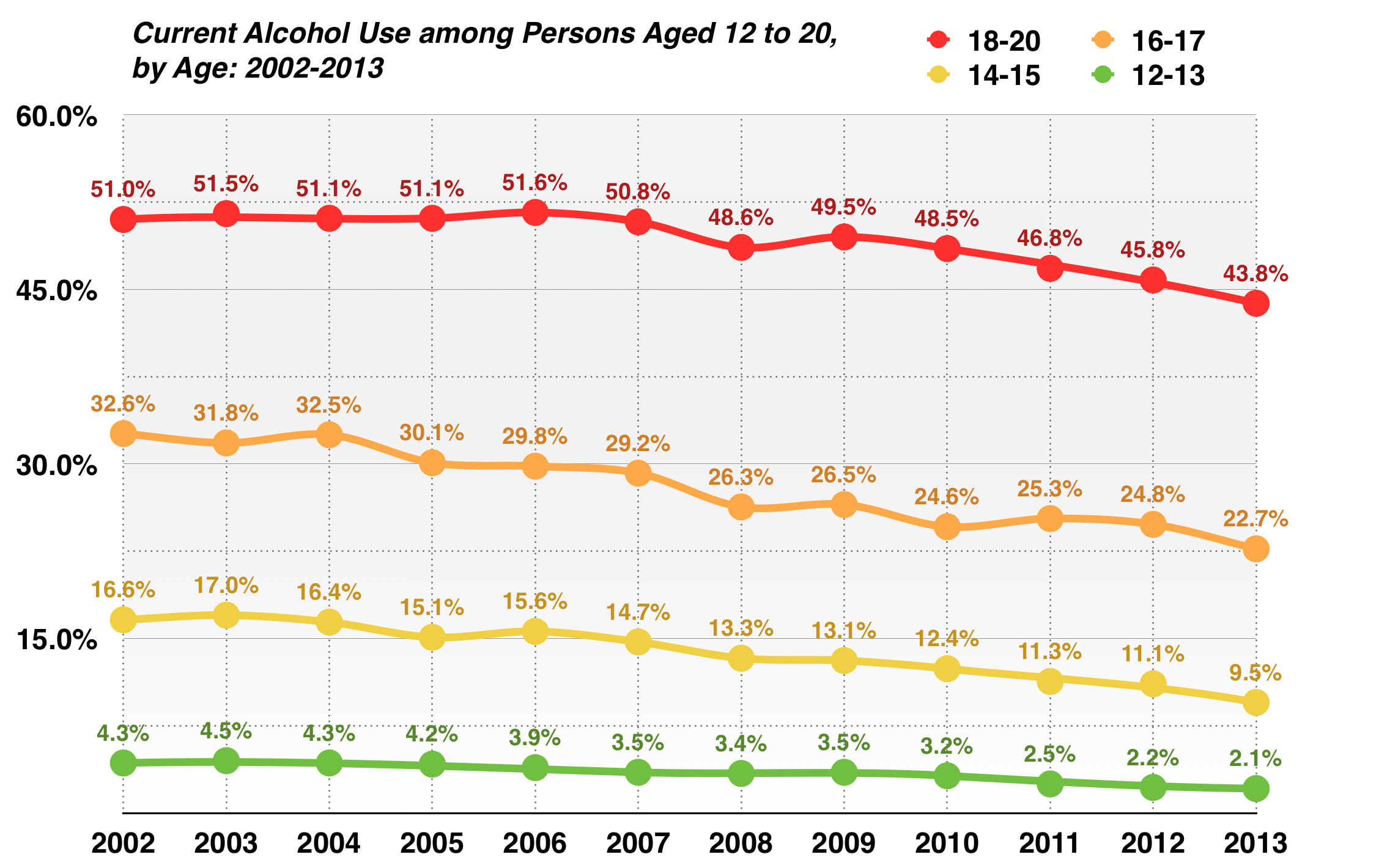
Current Alcohol Use among Persons Aged 12 to 20 in the United States. Source: SAMHSA

Although the incidence of underage drinking is still significant, government, university and national statistics have confirmed that alcohol use and binge drinking among high school students has declined steadily over the past three decades, and continues to decline annually. According to a United States Substance Abuse and Mental Health Services Administration study involving 30,000 youths 12 to 20 years of age, between 2002 and 2013 the percentage of underage drinkers declined from 28.8% to 22.7%. Underage binge drinkers decreased 19.3% to 14.2%. A study conducted in December 2014 by the University of Michigan also found that 75% of senior high school students disapproved of drinking excessively on the weekends. Alcohol still proved to be the favored substance among American youths however, with tobacco and illicit drugs following in rank. According to data from the Centers for Disease Control and Prevention, obtained by The Hill, drug and alcohol-related deaths among children aged 15 to 19 have increased from 788 in 2018 to 1,755 in 2021.

== Parental supervision of alcohol consumption for minors ==
Those who oppose a complete ban on underage drinking argue that it is important that minors be introduced to alcohol in a controlled environment, so that supervision and guidance might occur instead of experimentation. Some parents are willing to provide alcohol for their children if they drink it in a controlled environment. Furnishing alcohol to one's own children is permitted in 31 states, while it's illegal to do so for other people's children in all fifty states. Social host ordinances have been enacted in a number of jurisdictions to attempt to limit the parties where adults may permit minors to drink. Social host laws or ordinances have proliferated in the last ten years because it has been too difficult for law enforcement to prove which adults furnished or served alcohol to minors in their own home, so it permits them to cite or arrest the adult who has control of the premises. Due to the difficulty in proving these cases, some states make this an affirmative defense that the defendant must prove consumption was legally permissible.

== Current state (upto 2025 data) ==
According to the National Institute on Alcohol Abuse and Alcoholism's 2024 report, most Americans report ever drinking: 79.2% of those 12+, including 85.0% of adults 18+ and 21.3% of teens 12–17. In 2023, 62.0% of people 12+ drank (66.5% among adults; 16.4% among teens). Men consistently report slightly higher prevalence than women across lifetime, past-year, and past-month measures.

Patterns vary by race/ethnicity: among people 12+, White respondents generally show higher prevalence, while Asian respondents show lower prevalence. Taken together, the 2024 snapshot shows alcohol use remains common, especially among adults, with notable demographic differences and substantially lower (but non-trivial) prevalence among adolescents.

According to the 2025 Monitoring the Future survey, underage drinking continued a long-term decline among U.S. 8th, 10th, and 12th graders, with lifetime, past-year, and past-30-day alcohol use at or near historic low levels; binge drinking rates among teens also remained low in 2025.

== See also ==
- Alcohol advertising on college campuses
- California Department of Alcoholic Beverage Control
- Legal drinking age in the United States
