= Expungement in Missouri =

Missouri has two forms of expungement, one generally applicable to criminal cases and a unique one for the crime of being a minor in possession of alcohol. On July 13, 2016, governor Jay Nixon signed Senate Bill 588 into law, which expands the opportunities available for expungement of criminal convictions in Missouri. The new law went into effect January 1, 2018.

== Ordinary expungement ==
If certain requirements are met, Missouri law allows a person to have an arrest record expunged, which the law of Missouri defines as the process of legally destroying, obliterating or striking out records or information in files, computers and other depositories relating to criminal charges.

A person is eligible for expungement in Missouri if the arrest was based on false information and the following conditions exist:

1. There is no probable cause to believe the person committed the offense;
2. No charges will be pursued as a result of the arrest;
3. The person has no prior or subsequent misdemeanor or felony convictions;
4. The person did not receive a suspended imposition of sentence for the offense; and
5. No civil action is pending relating to the arrest or records sought to be expunged.

If a person qualifies, in order to have the records expunged, they must file a verified petition for expungement in the civil division of the Circuit Court in the county of the arrest. The court sets a hearing on the matter no sooner than thirty days after the petition was filed. If the court finds that the petitioner is entitled to expungement of any record, it will enter an order directing expungement.

Records expunged under this provision still may be opened to law enforcement if the person is charged with a subsequent offense or if any of the requirements of expungement no longer are met.

== The Missouri Expungement Law Senate Bill 588 ==
With the 2018 Missouri Expungement Law, a process has been created where around 1,900 eligible offenses can be sealed. There have been several amendments since its passage. Under current law, some individuals with misdemeanor convictions can file petitions after one year and those with felonies, after three years. This law opens the door for thousands of offenders to petition the courts to seal or remove their records of arrests and convictions as of January 1, 2018. After a successful petition, those with no other criminal record will be able to honestly answer “no” to inquiries about whether they have a criminal record (Unless a specific employer is required by law to exclude certain applicants).

For individuals who are eligible to start their petition process they have to file them in the court where they were charged or found guilty of the crime (offenses, violations, infractions). The petition must include all names of municipal prosecuting attorneys, law enforcement agencies, courts, state repositories of criminal records – basically any entity that might possess records of the items they wish to have expunged. They must also list every offense they wish to have expunged.

The state will then have 30-days to file objections to the petition you have filed. If there is an objection the court must hold a hearing within 60-days, or 30-days if there is no objection. While the one and three year waiting period has been stated, the bill does not explicitly demand this, so there might be avenues open for an earlier expungement date. The individual will also have to show the court that their habits and personal conduct, since their release, make them a good candidate for expungement. This is the key element to the success of their petition.

The petition process can take as little as 120-days resulting in a removal of their criminal record from potential landlords, employers and financial institution immediately.

== Minor in possession of alcohol ==
In 2005, the Missouri General Assembly enacted a special new section in the state's Liquor Control Law allowing for the complete and total expungement for the offense of being a minor in possession of alcohol. Unlike ordinary expungement, the MIP expungement exists with the explicit legislative mandate that the effect of an order of expungement under it "shall be to restore such person to the status occupied prior to such arrest, plea or conviction, as if such event had never happened."

After not less than one year since the offense was disposed of, or upon reaching the age of twenty-one, whichever occurs first, a person who pleaded guilty to or was found guilty of the crime of minor in possession of alcohol for the first time, and who since such conviction has not been convicted of any other alcohol-related offense, may apply to the civil division of the circuit court of the county in which the person was sentenced for an order to expunge all official records of the arrest, plea, trial and conviction.

The person also must meet the following requirements:

1. The person has not been convicted of any other alcohol-related offense at the time of the application for expungement; and
2. The person has had no other contacts with law enforcement (i.e. arrest, charge) which were alcohol-related (such as for drunk driving or violation of the terms of a liquor license).

If a person has had an MIP record expunged this way, the law states they cannot "be held thereafter under any provision of any law to be guilty of perjury or otherwise giving a false statement by reason of failure to recite or acknowledge such arrest, plea, trial, conviction or expungement in response to any inquiry made for any purpose whatsoever."

A person is only entitled to one MIP expungement under this special provision.

== Legalization of Marijuana and Expungement ==
Amendment 3 was passed with 53% of the vote in November 2022, making Missouri the 21st state to legalize recreational marijuana. Missouri's new marijuana law went into effect on January 1, 2023, making it legal for anyone older than 21 to buy, possess, deliver, use, manufacture, and sell marijuana in the state. It also sets the stage for thousands of Missourians to have their criminal records expunged, a move that some say is a step in the right direction for criminal justice reform. The amendment also sets aside funds to pay for the expungement process, which can cost upwards of $250 per expungement.

The amendment decriminalizes recreational marijuana and prevents arrests and penalties for personal possession and cultivation of limited amounts of marijuana. Almost all marijuana related offenses are eligible for expungement, with the exception of distribution to minors.

== Resources to seek Expungement ==
While people can hire a private attorney to help them get an expungement, the process can be expensive, and lawyer fees can be hefty, as well. The expungement process can also be navigated by a Pro Se litigant. A Pro Se Litigant represents themselves in court without an attorney. Not all court proceedings are Pro Se litigants (felony or capital criminal prosecutions, for example). For this reason, there are multiple organizations in Missouri that seek to assist Pro Se litigants obtain an expungement.

The most expansive is the Clear My Record Project, which is partnered with the University of Missouri at Kansas City School of Law Expungement Clinic, which is run by Dean Emeritus Ellen Y. Suni, and Sydney Ragsdale. This organization originated in 2017 to meet the unmet need for legal assistance for individuals seeking expungement. The Expungement Clinic advises low-income expungement seekers with Missouri convictions about their eligibility for an expungement, and how an expungement will assist them in their day-to-day needs. In 2020, the clinic entered its first appearance on behalf of a client, and there are multiple attorneys in the clinic now that represent indigent clients through their expungement proceeding. The Expungement clinic does not charge for their services, but will some times require clients to pay the court fees, which are around $250.

The current case load of the Expungement Clinic is large, so it can take a long time to get response from an attorney, but their attorneys and law students provide services year-round for qualifying clients. To get more information about the Clear My Record Project, and the Expungement Clinic, go to https://clearmyrecordmo.org/index.php/get-started. Additionally, you can call the clinic at 816-235-1671.

Gateway Legal Services is an organization based in St. Louis, Missouri, and also helps low-income clients obtain an expungement of a Missouri conviction. Contact them at gatewaylegal.org or call them at 314-534-0404.

== Limitations of Expungements in Missouri ==
One major limitation of getting an expungement in Missouri is that some private, proprietary background checking websites do not update frequently enough to immediately recognize the sealing of a criminal record. So, even with an expungement, private parties are not forced to clear their records of the criminal conviction. This means that landlords and employers that use a private background checking service may still see an arrest or conviction that should have been sealed.

The only way to get around this is to list the private background checking as a party to the expungement proceeding, which would mean that the private service has the ability to object to an expungement, and therefore inhibit a person's ability to reap the rewards of an expungement.

Additionally, expungements only apply to certain felony charges, and a person may only get 1 felony and 2 misdemeanors expunged. So if a person has more than 1 felony, expunging one but still having another may not accomplish the goals that a person may seek.

Scholars and Lawyers studying the effects of this law are not sure how an expungement of a marijuana charge will affect federal gun prohibitions for felons. Expunged Missouri felonies are only recognized by Missouri and other states.

== See also ==
- Expungement in the United States
