= Minor in Possession =

U.S. person under 21 years old owning or consuming alcohol

In the United States, a Minor in Possession or a MIP (also referred to as a Possession of Alcohol Under the Legal Age or PAULA), is any person under the legal drinking age of 21 who possesses or consumes alcohol. Underage consumption is illegal, typically a misdemeanor. In California, depending on the county in which the person is charged, the crime may also be charged as an infraction. Anyone under the age of 21 who possesses alcohol in the United States with the exception of special circumstances is violating the law of the state.

== Punishments ==
Punishments for minors in possession vary by state. Since alcohol enforcement and the establishment of drinking ages is the responsibility of the individual states, only local and state agencies can legally write a minors in possession citation. As such, each state levies its own fines and punishments for a minors in possession.

In some states, a simple first-time minors in possession without any other circumstances (such as driving or public intoxication) may only involve a fine of $100–200. Often fines are reduced or eliminated provided the person convicted completes a program such as alcohol education, probation, or community service. In some states, a fine is eliminated, supplemented or accompanied with a loss of the accused driver license for a period of time ranging from 30 days to 12 months. For example, violation of California's Business & Professions Code Section 25662, regarding persons under 21 in possession of alcohol, carries a punishment of $250 and a mandatory revocation of driving privileges for one year in accordance with Vehicle Code Section 13202.5.

Some states, such as Virginia, allow social drinking with parental approval on private property. However, it is an affirmative defense to a charge of underage possession of alcohol, and a defendant would need to prove it was permissible.

Subsequent offenses or a person with a preexisting criminal record may frequently receive a full fine, or in some extreme cases, several days in jail. In many cases a third MIP may result in a loss of the accused driver's license until the age of 21.

In Washington state, the statutes impose that: providing to and possession of alcohol by minors (persons under 21) is a gross misdemeanor with a potential of $5,000 and a year in jail. Washington State's law does not apply to liquor given or permitted to be given to a person under the age of twenty-one years by a parent or guardian and consumed in the presence of the parent or guardian. Additionally, this RCW does not authorize consumption or possession of liquor by a person under the age of twenty-one years on any premises licensed by the state, such as a bar or restaurant. Also, A person under the age of twenty-one years who experiences alcohol poisoning and is in need of medical assistance shall not be charged or prosecuted under subsection (2)(a) of this section, if the evidence for the charge was obtained as a result of the poisoning and need for medical assistance.

== See also ==
- Alcohol consumption by youth in the United States
- National Minimum Drinking Age Act
- National Youth Rights Association
