= Lawrence Schall =

American academic administrator

Lawrence M. "Larry" Schall is the president of the New England Commission of Higher Education and the former and sixteenth president of Oglethorpe University, a private liberal arts college in Atlanta, Georgia.

== Early life and education ==
Schall was born in Manhattan and grew up in Wilmington, Delaware. He received his undergraduate degree from Swarthmore College in 1975 and his Juris Doctor degree from the University of Pennsylvania Law School in 1978.

== Career ==
After receiving his J.D., Schall practiced law in Philadelphia before returning to Swarthmore College, where he worked for fifteen years. Prior to becoming president of Oglethorpe University, he was the vice president for administration at Swarthmore. In March 2005, he was elected president of Oglethorpe University; he assumed the position of president on June 23, 2005. As president, Schall faced financial challenges as the university was spending $4 million more than it received in revenue when he assumed the presidency. With respect to Oglethorpe, Jack Guynn, the former president of the Federal Reserve Bank of Atlanta, has said that "Every indicator of success has moved in the right direction under [Schall's] leadership — enrollment, markers of academic strength such as SAT scores, philanthropic giving and on and on." Under his presidency, as of 2009, annual applications to Oglethorpe have more than quadrupled, revenue has increased by 40 percent, and annual fund-raising has doubled. Schall was inducted into Omicron Delta Kappa as a faculty/staff initiate in 2017 at Oglethorpe.

== Advocacy ==
Schall is a signatory of the Amethyst Initiative, which calls for "informed and unimpeded debate" regarding the United States' legal drinking age of 21. In 2013, he joined with Elizabeth Kiss, the president of Agnes Scott College, to start a letter urging reform of gun safety laws. Schall has said he had the idea to start this letter, which more than 300 college presidents have signed, in "a fit of sleeplessness" after the Sandy Hook Elementary School shooting.

== Personal life ==
Schall began working as an Uber driver in the summer of 2015. He and his wife, Betty Londergan, have four children.
