= Legal drinking age in the United States =

The legal drinking age varies from country to country. In the United States, the legal drinking age is currently 21, except in Puerto Rico and the U.S. Virgin Islands, where it is 18. To curb excessive alcohol consumption by younger people, instead of raising the drinking age, other countries have raised the prices of alcohol beverages and encouraged the general public to drink less. Setting a legal drinking age of 21 is designed to discourage reckless alcohol consumption by youth, limiting consumption to those who are more mature, who can be expected to make reasonable and wise decisions when it comes to drinking.

== History behind alcohol consumption ==
Fermented alcoholic beverages contain ethanol (C_{2}H_{5}OH), a consumable member of the alcohol class of chemical compounds, often simply called "alcohol." These beverages are legal in most countries.

The US, along with only a handful of other countries, maintains the highest drinking age worldwide at 21 (known as the Minimum Legal Drinking Age of 21, or MLDA-21). In 1984, the United States Congress passed the National Minimum Drinking Age Act (NMDAA), which penalized any state that allowed persons under the age of 21 to purchase alcoholic beverages by reducing that state's annual federal highway apportionment. In 1985, South Dakota challenged the NMDAA, but in 1987, the Supreme Court ruled the Act was constitutional for the purchase of alcoholic beverages. The Court indicated that the states still had the right to set their own drinking ages; if this action is taken, the federal government can assess a 10% penalty on highway funds for states that choose to set their drinking age lower than 21. Less than a year after the Supreme Court ruling, all 50 states in the United States officially made 21 the minimum legal drinking age. Motor vehicle accidents decreased after the legal drinking age was raised, but the MLDA-21 is not the only variable that can be identified as a reason for the declining accident rate. The shift in demographics, increased enforcement, increased seat belt use, safer cars, increased parental monitoring, and "designated driver" emphasis are also factors that are likely to have played a part in lowering the vehicle accident rate in the U.S.

== Epidemiology ==
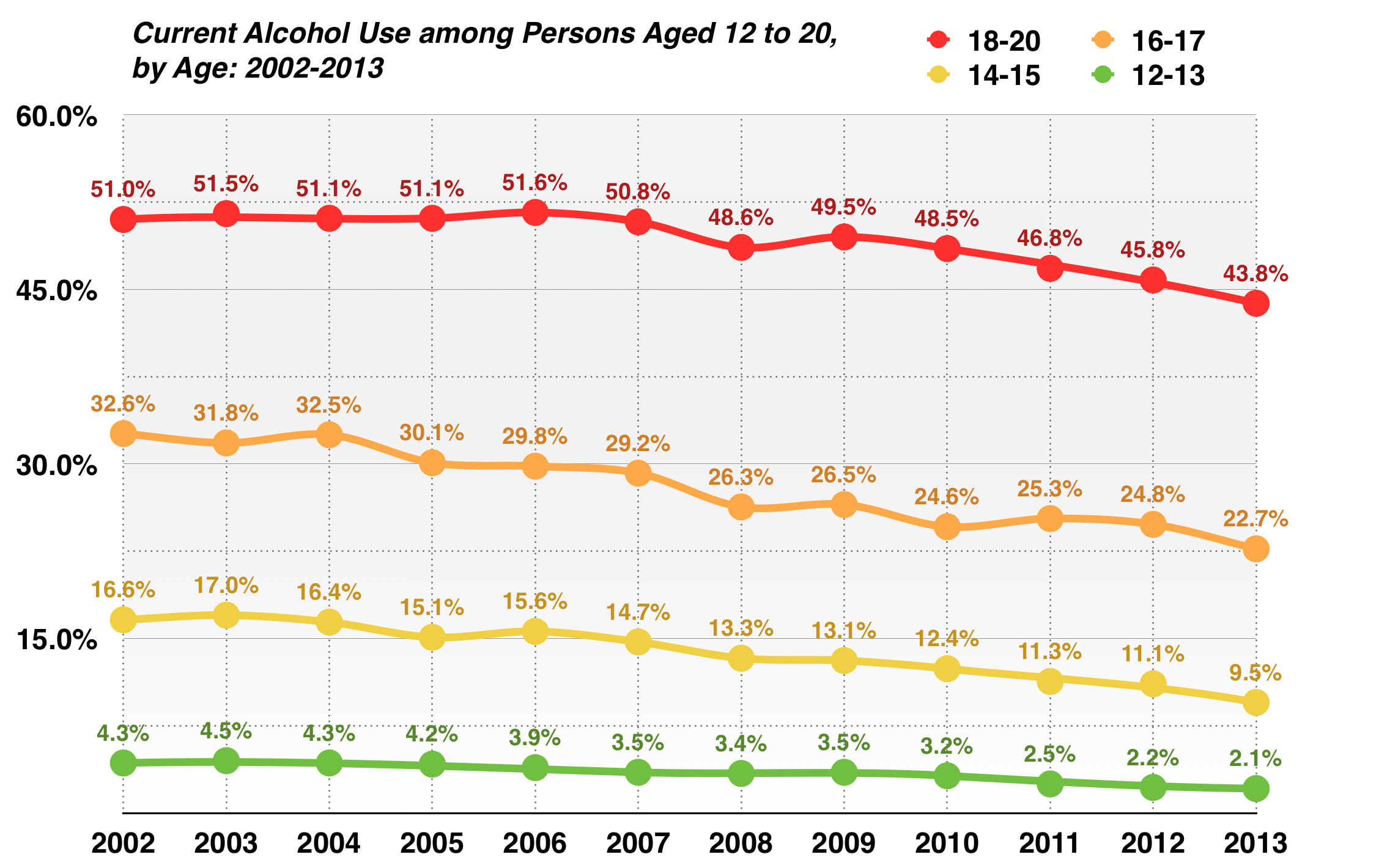
Current alcohol use among persons aged 12 to 20 in the United States. Source: SAMHSA

Alcohol is the most commonly used and abused drug among youth in the United States, more so than tobacco and illicit drugs. Although the purchase of alcohol by persons under the age of 21 is illegal, people aged 12–20 years old consume 11% of all alcohol consumed in the US. Among the 14 million adults aged 21 or older who were classified as having alcohol dependence or abuse in the past year, more than 13 million had started using alcohol before age 21. Since 1984, when the National Minimum Drinking Age Act made the minimum legal drinking age for every state in the nation 21, there has been a steady increase in the prevalence of alcohol use, heavy use, and frequent use among underage drinkers as the age increases. Across all ages, the highest rates of alcohol abuse occur among persons 19 years old due to illegality of their behavior, and peak alcohol dependence occurs at age 22.

In 2013, more than two-thirds of American students had consumed alcohol by the end of high school; and more than half of 12th graders had been drunk at least once in their lifetime.

== Socioeconomic effects ==
The US economy loses hundreds of billions of dollars from lost productivity and earnings, with alcohol-related illness being a primary factor. The most dangerous social problem involved in underage drinking is driving under the influence because of its contribution to fatalities and injuries among adolescents. One-third of all car accidents among adolescents have to do with alcohol consumption. Some states have lower alcohol taxes and even made alcohol available to be purchased tax-free at state-owned stores to compete with Maine, Vermont, and Massachusetts. Teen drinking in high school is down 23% since 1983, when the minimum legal drinking age was enacted, and binge drinking is down 17%. Alcohol can cause problems throughout life, it is not only young adults that are affected, people into their sixties struggle with alcoholism. The movement of young adults from high school to college shows that 44% of college students were binge drinkers and that binge drinking peaked at age 21. Approximately three quarters of college students aged 18–20 years old drank alcohol in 2009. Within the U.S., youth are being targeted by social media in order to drive sales higher by highlighting alcohol consumption in a positive way. The legal drinking age was set at 21 years of age because studies showed that the leading cause of death among people aged 1 to 34 accounted for one third of deaths due to unintentional injury from alcohol consumption.

== Psychological effects ==
The liver is the organ that is most affected by alcohol. The brain is also affected, however, and can be damaged, leading to the drinker's behavioral changes and emotional distress. Three noticeable effects of alcohol injury to the brain are memory loss, confusion, and augmentation. An adult is legally considered to be over the age of 18, has the right to vote, contractual capacity, and financial responsibility. By age 15, adolescents are as capable as adults at logically assessing the likelihood of risk due to their development of emotional and behavioral self-regulation by this age. Studies on adolescent sensitivity to alcohol showed that there were few gross behavioral changes between children (10–15) after they were given a dose of alcohol that would cause intoxication in adults. Good parental communication and high levels of parental nurture can lead to lower levels of alcohol abuse in adolescents.

== Physiological effects ==
Alcohol abuse can lead to many problems, including an increased risk of cardiovascular disease, a depressant effect resulting in decreased attention and slow reaction speeds, loss of control of actions, mood changes, addiction, brain deterioration, and pregnancy issues. Alcohol increases the flow of insulin, which speeds up glucose metabolism and results in low blood sugar. This could be fatal for diabetics. Peak blood alcohol concentrations are reached in an average time of 0.75 to 1.35 hours depending on dose and last time of meal. Several factors affect a person's intoxication rate, including absorption rate factors such as food intake and drink strength, distribution factors, such as body fat, type, and weight, and elimination factors such as rate of consumption, tolerance, and gender differences.

== Views ==
There are multiple views on the drinking age and how it should be handled. Most people argue one of three views, whether it should stay at 21, lower to 16 or 20, or raise to 25 or 28. Some people, such as sociology professor David Hanson, suggest lowering it. Underage drinking is already common, but NHTSA spokeswoman Evelyn Avant believes that lowering the drinking age would lead to even more alcohol use among young people. Many people say they would not mind the high drinking age as long as the enlistment age was also 21. There are also some who believe the age should stay the same for hard liquor while being lowered for wine and beer.
