= Underage club =

Type of youth entertainment venue

An underage club is a type of entertainment venue or nightclub that caters exclusively to the needs of individuals below the legal drinking age.

This is not to be confused with underage clubbing, where individuals below the legal age (mostly younger teenagers) pretend to be older than their ages, by using a fake ID or other means, in order to be allowed into a club where they are not legally of age to be admitted into.

== Complaints ==
Some complaints from people who are skeptical about the concept of underage clubs are from underage clubs creating an avenue for teenagers to be introduced to drugs. Another complaint is the introduction and subsequent practice of sexual activities by underage individuals within the club venues. A different complaint is the lack of adequate adult supervision within the premises of these clubs.
