= John McCardell Jr. =

American academic

- Born: June 17, 1949 (age 77); Maryland, U.S.
- Education: Washington and Lee University; Harvard University
- Occupations: Historian, academic administrator
- Employer: Sewanee: The University of the South

John Malcolm McCardell Jr. (born June 17, 1949) is an American historian and academic administrator. He served as the President of Middlebury College from 1992 to 2004 and as the Vice-Chancellor and President of Sewanee: The University of the South from 2010 to 2020.

As of 2023, he is a history professor at Sewanee.

== Early life ==
McCardell was born on June 17, 1949, in Frederick, Maryland. He graduated from Washington and Lee University in 1971. He earned a PhD in History from Harvard University in 1976. For his dissertation, The Idea of a Southern Nation, he was awarded the 1977 Allan Nevins Prize by the Society of American Historians.

== Academic career ==
McCardell joined the History department at Middlebury College in 1976 and was professor there until 2010. He served as the president of the college from 1992 to 2004. An anonymous donor of $50 million in the spring of 2004 asked that Middlebury's science center, Bicentennial Hall, be renamed John M. McCardell Jr. Bicentennial Hall.

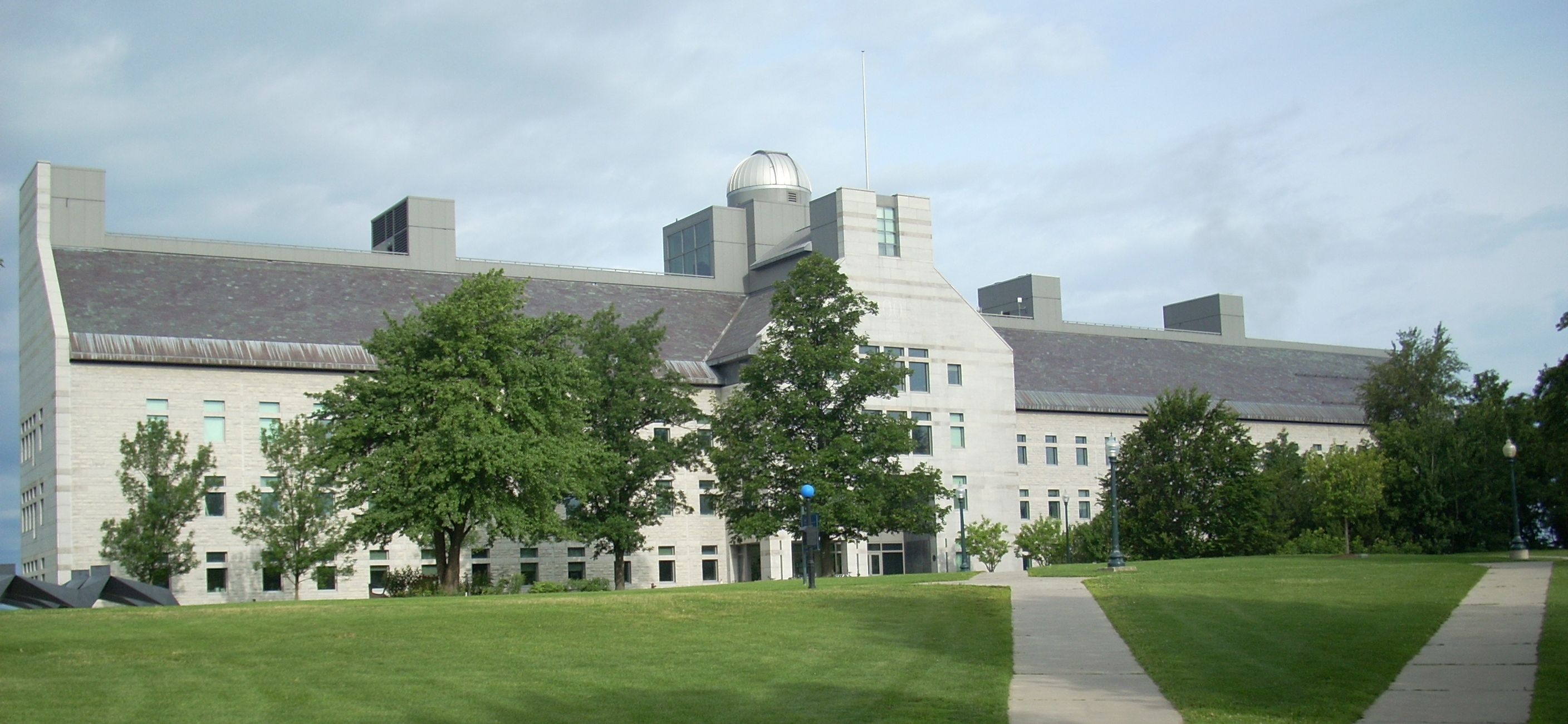
McCardell Bicentennial Hall at Middlebury College.

McCardell served as Vice-Chancellor of Sewanee: The University of the South from 2010 until June 17, 2020. As of 2023, he continues as a professor of history at the University.

=== Lowering the drinking age ===
McCardell is the founder and director of Choose Responsibility, an organization dedicated to exploring and advocating the lowering of the legal drinking age to 18 and issuing drinking learner permits to adults age 18, 19, and 20 in an effort to promote responsible consumption. He authored an op-ed in The New York Times in 2004 saying, "the 21-year-old drinking age is bad social policy and terrible law". He later spearheaded the creation of the Amethyst Initiative, a statement of over 120 college presidents across the United States calling for reconsideration of drinking age laws.

== Personal life ==
McCardell has a wife, Bonnie Greenwald, and two sons.

== Bibliography ==
- 2009: Editor with William J. Cooper, In the Cause of Liberty:How the Civil War Redefined American Ideals, Baton Rouge, LA.: Louisiana State University Press ISBN 978-0-8071-3444-3

Preceded by Timothy Light	President of Middlebury College; 1991–2004	Succeeded by Ronald D. Liebowitz
