= Amethyst Initiative =

Group aiming to change U.S. drinking age

- Logo of Amethyst Initiative
- Purpose: Legal drinking age reform

The Amethyst Initiative is an organization made up of U.S. college presidents and chancellors that, in July 2008, launched a movement calling for the reconsideration of U.S. legal drinking age, particularly the minimum age of 21.

The National Minimum Drinking Age Act of 1984 requires all US states to raise their minimum age for purchase and public possession of alcohol to 21 or face a reduction in highway funds under the Federal-Aid Highway Act.

== Background ==
The Amethyst Initiative was initiated by John McCardell, founder of Choose Responsibility, a former professor of history at Middlebury College in Middlebury, Vermont and current Vice-Chancellor of Sewanee: The University of the South, and is currently supported by 136 college presidents who signed a statement proclaiming, "It’s time to rethink the drinking age".

The idea of the organization's name came from a Greek and Roman legend, that amethysts protected their owners from drunkenness.

== Purpose ==
The Amethyst Initiative states that, in their experience as university presidents, they have observed, "Alcohol education that mandates abstinence as the only legal option has not resulted in significant constructive behavioral change among our students," and therefore they urge lawmakers "to invite new ideas about the best ways to prepare young adults to make responsible decisions about alcohol".

Gustavus Adolphus College President Jack R. Ohle said in a statement that the initiative is not about lowering the drinking age, but to open a debate on alcohol policies that affect young people and their choices about alcohol use.

We need serious, sustained, unfettered debate about the drinking age and the reality of life on a college campus and how these two things are aligned. I signed the statement in hopes that it would encourage debate on our campus about the seriousness of drinking in general but more importantly the high-risk drinking that has become so common on college campuses today. As an educator, I feel a responsibility to encourage a discussion about responsibility. That responsibility rests with not only the students but with those of us who work to provide for their education, safety, and well being. We must engage in civil, informed, and dispassionate debate and consider all policy alternatives no matter how controversial.

== Statement ==
The Amethyst Initiative states the following:

It’s time to rethink the drinking age

In 1984, Congress passed the National Minimum Drinking Age Act, which imposed a penalty of 10% of a state's federal highway appropriation on any state setting its drinking age lower than 21.

Twenty-four years later, our experience as college and university presidents convinces us that…

Twenty-one is not working

A culture of dangerous, clandestine “binge-drinking”—often conducted off-campus—has developed.

Alcohol education that mandates abstinence as the only legal option has not resulted in significant constructive behavioral change among our students.

Adults under 21 are deemed capable of voting, signing contracts, serving on juries and enlisting in the military, but are told they are not mature enough to have a beer.

By choosing to use fake IDs, students make ethical compromises that erode respect for the law.

How many times must we relearn the lessons of prohibition?

We call upon our elected officials:

To support an informed and dispassionate public debate over the effects of the 21-year-old drinking age.

To consider whether the 10% highway fund “incentive” encourages or inhibits that debate.

To invite new ideas about the best ways to prepare young adults to make responsible decisions about alcohol.

We pledge ourselves and our institutions to playing a vigorous, constructive role as these critical discussions unfold.

== Signatories ==
Signatories of the initiative include:

- President Vincent Maniaci, American International College
- President Jerry M. Greiner, Arcadia University
- President Ronald Slepitza, Avila University
- President Elizabeth Coleman, Bennington College
- President Scott D. Miller, Bethany College
- President Bobby Fong, Butler University
- President Jerry Wallace Campbell University
- President David Wolk, Castleton State College
- President Mark J. Tierno, Cazenovia College
- President Carmen Twillie Ambar, Cedar Crest College
- President James L. Doti, Chapman University
- President Esther L. Barazzone, Chatham University
- Interim President Frank G. Pogue, Chicago State University
- President John Bassett, Clark University
- President Anthony G. Collins, Clarkson University
- President James R. Phifer, Coe College
- President Rebecca S. Chopp, Colgate University
- President Robert Hoover, College of Idaho
- President Mary Pat Seurkamp, College of Notre Dame of Maryland
- President Frank Miglorie, College of St. Joseph
- President Richard F. Celeste, Colorado College
- President Dennison W. Griffith, Columbus College of Art & Design
- President James E. Wright, Dartmouth College
- President G.T. Smith, Davis and Elkins College
- President Brian W. Casey, DePauw University
- President William G. Durden, Dickinson College
- President Joseph R. Fink, Dominican University of California
- President Richard Brodhead, Duke University
- President Donald R. Eastman III, Eckerd College
- President Theodore Long, Elizabethtown College
- President Thomas Meier, Elmira College
- President Jacqueline Liebergott, Emerson College
- President Richard E. Wylie, Endicott College
- President Jeffrey Von Arx, Fairfield University
- President Judith L. Kuipers, Fielding Institute
- President Janet Morgan Riggs, Gettysburg College
- President Mark Scheinberg, Goodwin College
- President Sanford J. Ungar, Goucher College
- President Jack Ohle, Gustavus Adolphus College
- President Joan Hinde Stewart, Hamilton College
- President Walter M. Bortz, Hampden-Sydney College
- President Ralph J. Hexter, Hampshire College
- President Susan DeWine, Hanover College
- President Nancy O. Gray, Hollins University
- President Richard Gilman, C.S.C., Holy Cross College
- President William Brody, Johns Hopkins University
- President John J. Bowen, Johnson & Wales University
- President Barbara Murphy, Johnson State College
- Chancellor Leon Richards, Kapiʻolani Community College
- President S. Georgia Nugent, Kenyon College
- President Rev. Thomas J. O'Hara, King's College
- President Daniel H. Weiss, Lafayette College
- President Stephen D. Schutt, Lake Forest College
- President Thomas J. Hochstettler, Lewis & Clark College
- President James E. Collins, Loras College
- President Carol Moore, Lyndon State College
- President Leonard Tyler, Maine Maritime Academy
- President Thomas J. Scanlan, F.S.C., Manhattan College
- President Richard Berman, Manhattanville College
- President Ghazi Darkazalli, Marian Court College
- President Tim Foster, Mesa State College
- President Stephen M. Jordan, Metropolitan State College of Denver
- President Ronald Liebowitz, Middlebury College
- President Frances Lucas, Millsaps College
- President Mary Ellen Jukoski, Mitchell College
- President Susan Cole, Montclair State University
- President Christopher Thomforde, Moravian College
- President John Reynders, Morningside College
- President Joanne V. Creighton, Mount Holyoke College
- President Peyton R. Helm, Muhlenberg College
- President Randy Dunn, Murray State University
- President Thomas B. Coburn, Naropa University
- President Fran Voigt, New England Culinary Institute
- President Debra Townsley, Nichols College
- President Robert A. Skotheim, Occidental College
- President Lawrence Schall, Oglethorpe University
- President E. Gordon Gee, Ohio State University
- President Bonnie Laing-Malcolmson, Oregon College of Art & Craft
- President Loren J. Anderson, Pacific Lutheran University
- President Phil Creighton, Pacific University
- President John Mills, Paul Smith's College
- President David W. Oxtoby, Pomona College
- President Robert A. Gervasi, Quincy University
- President Robert R. Lindgren, Randolph-Macon College
- President William E. Troutt, Rhodes College
- President David C. Joyce, Ripon College
- President Gregory Dell'Omo, Robert Morris University
- President Charles R. Middleton, Roosevelt University
- President Eric R. Gilbertson, Saginaw Valley State University
- President Timothy R. Lannon, Saint Joseph's University (PA)
- President Arthur F. Kirk, Saint Leo University
- President Patricia Maguire Meservey, Salem State College
- President Paul L. Locatelli, S.J., Santa Clara University
- President Joel L. Cunningham, Sewanee: University of the South
- President Carol T. Christ, Smith College
- President Paul LeBlanc, Southern New Hampshire University
- President Beverly Daniel Tatum, Spelman College
- President Robert E. Ritschel, Spoon River College
- President Pamela Trotman Reid, Saint Joseph College (Connecticut)
- President Daniel F. Sullivan, St. Lawrence University
- President Harold J. Raveche, Stevens Institute of Technology
- President Thomas Schwarz, SUNY College at Purchase
- President L. Jay Lemons, Susquehanna University
- President Elisabeth S. Muhlenfeld, Sweet Briar College
- Chancellor Nancy Cantor, Syracuse University
- President J. Patrick O'Brien, Texas A&M University, West Texas
- President Robert Caret, Towson University
- President James F. Jones, Jr., Trinity College
- President John M. Stamm, Trinity Lutheran College
- President Lawrence S. Bacow, Tufts University
- President Thomas P. Rosandich, United States Sports Academy
- President Walter Harrison, University of Hartford
- President Jennifer Hunter-Cevera, University of Maryland Biotechnology Institute
- President C.D. Mote Jr., University of Maryland, College Park
- President Jack M. Wilson, University of Massachusetts
- Chancellor Robert C. Holub, University of Massachusetts Amherst
- President George M. Dennison, University of Montana - Missoula
- President Steven H. Kaplan, University of New Haven
- President Louis J. Agnese Jr., University of the Incarnate Word
- Chancellor John P. Keating, University of Wisconsin, Parkside
- Chancellor William E. Kirwan, University System of Maryland
- President Geoffrey Shields, Vermont Law School
- Chancellor Robert Clarke, Vermont State Colleges
- President Ty J. Handy, Vermont Technical College
- President Charles W. Steger, Virginia Tech
- President Cleveland L. Sellers Jr., Voorhees College
- President William E. Hamm, Wartburg College
- President Tori Haring-Smith, Washington & Jefferson College
- President Kenneth P. Ruscio, Washington & Lee University
- President L. Baird Tipson, Washington College
- President Michael Bassis, Westminster College of Salt Lake City
- President Ronald A. Crutcher, Wheaton College (MA)
- President Sharon D. Herzberger, Whittier College
- President James T. Harris, Widener University
- President M. Lee Pelton, Willamette University
- President Lorna Duphiney Edmundson, Wilson College

== Public reaction ==
The initiative's proposal has been criticized by several groups and government and industry officials, including Mothers Against Drunk Driving (MADD). Joining MADD's criticism are other groups, including the Insurance Institute for Highway Safety, the American Medical Association, and the National Transportation Safety Board. A spokesman for the Governors Highway Safety Association told The Washington Post that university leaders "are really just punting on the issue and leaving the high school principals to deal with it." However, Amethyst Initiative's parent organization, Choose Responsibility, proposes that only high school graduates should be eligible.

In a press release, MADD argues that lowering the drinking age would result in greater numbers of fatal automobile accidents, and that the presidents are "looking for an easy way out of an inconvenient problem" and "misrepresenting science." MADD cited former U.S. Department of Health and Human Services Secretary, and current University of Miami president Donna Shalala statement that "maintaining the legal drinking age at 21 is a socially and medically sound policy that helps parents, schools and law enforcement protect our youth from the potentially life-threatening effects of underage drinking."

In addition, MADD debates that: "minimum drinking ages have saved approximately 25,000 lives", "[l]owering the age will cause even younger people to begin drinking", and that "[b]inge drinking on college campuses should be combated with stricter enforcement of current laws."

Choose Responsibility argues that scientific evidence supports the Amethyst Initiative's views and goals, and refutes some of MADD's past claims. Sanford Ungar, president of Goucher College and signee of the initiative argues that opponents should not fear because the Amethyst Initiative is about opening up the debate to improve alcohol policy. He brings about the misconception that they want to "polarize" the issue at hand, but instead wishes to find a better alternative to the current drinking age.

Radley Balko, of Reason, wryly noted inconsistency in opponents' arguments and supporting evidence against the Amethyst Initiative in that they believe that it "would be a "national tragedy" to, for example, allow 19- and 20-year-old men and women returning from Iraq and Afghanistan to have a beer in celebration of completing their tours of duty." Balko, also, noting research showing that underage drinking laws had not reduced highway deaths.

In November 2008, the Student Senate at the University of Wisconsin–La Crosse rejected a proposal to urge that university's chancellor to sign the Amethyst Initiative. Supposedly the first such attempt by a student body to ask a president or chancellor to sign on, the measure at UW–L was defeated 14–19 after three weeks' debate. Chancellor Joe Gow said this vote, "certainly defies the 'conventional wisdom' regarding young people being eager to lower the drinking age."

In 2014, a pair of researchers published a literature review in Journal of Studies on Alcohol and Drugs of studies on the effect of the drinking age in response to the Amethyst Initiative; the review indicates support for the drinking age remaining at 21.

== See also ==
- Alcohol consumption by youth in the United States
- Legal drinking age
- Choose Responsibility
- Young adult (psychology)
- Youth development
- Adolescent psychology
- Age of criminal responsibility
