= Legal drinking age =

Minimum age at which a person can legally purchase or drink alcoholic beverages

The legal drinking age is the minimum age at which a person can legally consume alcoholic beverages. The minimum age alcohol can be legally consumed can be different from the age when it can be purchased in some countries. These laws vary between countries and many laws have exemptions or special circumstances, up to no laws about consumption at all. Most laws apply only to drinking alcohol in public places with alcohol consumption in the home being mostly unregulated (one of the exceptions being England and Wales, which have a minimum legal age of five for supervised consumption in private places). Some countries also have different age limits for different types of alcohol drinks.

Minimum legal age to purchase alcohol by country: Prohibited at any age 25 or older 25 (supervised drinking/fermented alcoholic beverages from the age of 21) 21 21 (supervised drinking/fermented alcoholic beverages from the age of 18) 20 20 (supervised drinking/fermented alcoholic beverages from the age of 18) 19 18 18 (supervised drinking/fermented alcoholic beverages from the age of 16) 17 16 15 or younger No regulation/no age set

The majority of countries have a minimum legal drinking age of 18. The most commonly known reason for the law behind the legal drinking age is the effect on the brain in adolescents. Since the brain is still maturing, alcohol can have a negative effect on the memory and long-term thinking. Alongside that, it can cause liver failure, and create a hormone imbalance in teens due to the constant changes and maturing of hormones during puberty. Some countries have a minimum legal drinking age of 19 to prevent the flow of alcoholic beverages in high schools, while others like the United States have a minimum legal purchasing age of 21 (except in P.R. and USVI, where the drinking age is 18) in an effort to reduce the amount of drunk driving rates among teenagers and young adults.

There are underage clubs, where people below the legal drinking age are catered for and are served non-alcoholic beverages.

== Africa ==
The most common minimum age to purchase alcohol in Africa is 18. However, Angola (except Luanda Province), Central African Republic, Comoros, Equatorial Guinea, Guinea-Bissau, and Mali have no laws on the books restricting the sale of alcohol to minors. In Libya, Somalia and Sudan the sale, production and consumption of alcohol is completely prohibited.

Country	State/ region/ province	De jure		Notes
Country	State/ region/ province	Drinking age	Purchase age	Notes
Algeria		None	18	Order No. 26-75 (1975), Article 14
Angola		None		There is no national legislation prohibiting the sale of alcohol to minors.
Angola	Luanda Province	18		Legislation in Luanda Province: It is prohibited to sell alcohol beverages to anyone under the age of 18. It is also prohibited for minors to buy and consume alcohol.
Benin		None	20	Republic of Benin Report to UN Committee on the Rights of the Child CRC/C/BEN/2 (2005): Article 8 of the decree of 10 June 1942 regulating the production, import, advertisement, sale, and consumption of alcohol beverages in French West Africa, prohibits the sale or free supply of alcohol beverages to minors under 20.; Article 13 stipulates fines ranging from CFAF 200,000 to CFAF 1 million for such offences, doubled in the case of repeat offences.; There are no official measures prohibiting children from consuming alcohol, tobacco or other substances harmful to their health.
Botswana		None (prohibited for any person to supply)	18	It is prohibited for any person with a liquor license to sell or supply alcohol beverages to minors under the age of 18 years. Since the law only applies to licenses, it is not prohibited for minors to buy, consume, or possess alcohol beverages. It is also prohibited for any person to expose or supply alcohol to a minor under the age of 18 years.
Burundi		None	18 (unless accompanied by parent or legal guardian)	It is prohibited for any person with a liquor license to sell or supply alcohol beverages to unaccompanied minors under the age of 18 years.
Cameroon		21; 18 (if accompanied by a person 21 years of age or older)		It is prohibited for any person with a liquor license to sell or supply alcohol beverages to anyone under 18 years of age. The law permits adults from the ages 18 to 21 to consume, purchase and buy alcohol beverages if accompanied by a person 21 years of age or older. Anyone over the age of 21 years may buy or consume alcohol unaccompanied.
Cape Verde		None	18	It is prohibited for any person to sell or supply alcohol beverages to minors under the age of 18 years.
Central African Republic		15 (off-premises), or 21 (on-premises)		It is prohibited for any person to sell or supply alcohol beverages to minors under the age of 15 years when sold or supplied off-premises (e.g., liquor stores, wine stores, and supermarkets). It is prohibited for any person to sell or supply alcohol beverages to minors under the age of 21 years when sold or supplied on-premises (e.g., restaurants, bars, and cafes).
Chad		None	18	Law 2017-01 Penal Code Chapter 6 Articles 376–378 establish penalties for licensees who permit entry to youth below age 16 unaccompanied by a supervising adult, sell or offer alcohol beverages to youth below age 18 unaccompanied by a supervising adult, or serve a person below age 18 to intoxication.
Comoros		18		It is prohibited for any person to sell or supply alcohol beverages to minors under the age of 18 years.
Democratic Republic of the Congo		18		
Djibouti		None		
Egypt		21		Law No. 371 of 1956 concerning public shops and the resolutions implementing it
Equatorial Guinea		21		
Eritrea		None	18	It is prohibited for any person to sell or serve alcohol beverages to minors under the age of 18 years.
Eswatini		18		Liquor Licenses Act (1964) Section 27
Ethiopia		21		It is prohibited for any person to sell, offer, serve or allow to serve alcohol beverages "in substantial quantities" to any infant or young person. The criminal code defines a young person as any person under the age of 18 years. But the Criminal Code Proclamation 414 (2004) states: "Whoever endangers the health of another, intentionally and unscrupulously, by administering or serving, or by causing or permitting to be administered or served, to minors (defined as anyone under the age of 18 years) (...) alcohol beverages or spirituous liquors of such kind or in such quantity as to make their injurious effect certain or probable, is punishable with simple imprisonment not exceeding one year, and fine." The Revised Family Code Proclamation No. 213 (2000) Article 215 defines a minor as anyone who has not attained the full age of 18. In 2019, the Ethiopian parliament passed a bill that bans a specific category of alcohol advertising in the media and also increases the age limit for purchasing alcohol from 18 to 21 years of age.
Gabon		None	18	Penal Code (1963), Article 209bis-1
Gambia		None	16	Under the Liquor License Act (1957) it is prohibited to sell, serve or supply alcohol beverages to "anyone under the apparent age of 16". A "young person" is defined as anyone under the age of 17 by the Children and Young Persons Act, 1949 Section 2.
Ghana		None	18	
Guinea-Bissau		None		
Kenya		None	18	It is prohibited to sell, serve or supply alcohol beverages to anyone under the age of 18 years.
Lesotho		18		It is prohibited to sell, serve or supply any alcohol beverage to a minor under the age of 18 years. It is also prohibited for minors to consume, buy or attempt to buy alcohol.
Liberia		None	18	It is prohibited to sell, serve or supply alcohol beverages to anyone under the age of 18 years; "this section shall not apply to a parent or guardian who serves an alcoholic beverage to his child or ward" Penal Law of 1976 Sec 16.
Libya		Prohibited for all ages		Previously Article 498 of the Libyan Penal Code prohibited the sale of alcohol beverages to juveniles under the age of 16 years. The ban on alcohol makes no exception for foreigners or tourists.
Malawi		None	18	It is prohibited to sell, serve or supply alcohol beverages to anyone under the age of 18 years.
Mauritania		Prohibited for all ages		All forms of alcohol are prohibited.
Mauritius		None	18	It is prohibited to sell, serve, or supply alcoholic beverages to anyone under the age of 18 years.
Morocco		None	Restricted to 18 for non-Muslims, Prohibited for Muslims	Legislative Decision No. 3.177.66 of 1967 Art 28–29
Mozambique		18		Decree 54/2013 Regulations on the Control of the Production, Sale and Consumption of Alcoholic Beverages (2013), Article 5 (Prohibitions)
Namibia		None	18	It is prohibited to sell, serve or supply alcohol beverages to anyone under the age of 18 years.
Niger		18		Penal Code Article 302
Nigeria		None (at national level)	None (all other states); 18 in Abuja; Prohibited in northern states	For Abuja: Municipal Area Council Bye-Law 2001 Sec 15
Republic of the Congo		None	18	
Rwanda		18		Organic Law implementing the Penal Code N°01/2012/OL Articles 217 and 219
Senegal		None	18	
Saint Helena		18		
Seychelles		None	18	Chapter 113 Licenses Act (2010): Subsidiary Legislation: Licenses (Manufacturing) Regulation (1987), Article 8(5)(page 20): In the case of manufacturing and processing of liquor, tobacco and tobacco products, the license holder shall (i) not deliver or sell liquor to, or allow any consumption of liquor by, any person under the age of 18 years or deliver or sell tobacco or tobacco products or allow it to be used on the premises by such a person; Subsidiary Legislation: Licenses (Liquor and Outdoor Entertainment) Regulations (1998), Article 14 (page 28): (1) The holder of a license, his servant or agent shall not (a) employ or allow a person under the age of 18 years, ... (b) sell or deliver liquor, cigarettes or tobacco products to, or allow liquor to be consumed or cigarettes or any tobacco products to be used by any person under the age of 18 years on the premises; ... (i) admit any person under the age of 18 years to a premises licensed as a public bar, toddy bar or at the premises licensed to manufacture and sell baka or lapire;...
Somalia		Prohibited for all ages		
South Africa		None	18	The parent, adult guardian of a minor or a person responsible for administering a religious sacrament, may on occasion supply to that minor a moderate quantity of liquor to be consumed by the minor in the presence and under the supervision of that parent, guardian or other person.
South Sudan		18		
Sudan		Restricted to non-Muslims; Muslims: Prohibited for all ages Non-Muslims: None		Penal Code 1991, Art 78–79. There is no statutory minimum age for non-Muslims, but there are strict restrictions regarding location. Non-Muslim citizens (such as the country's Christian minority) have been granted legal permission to consume alcohol. However, this is permitted only in strictly private settings; drinking in public or in the company of Muslims is expressly prohibited.
Tanzania		None	18	
Togo		None	20; 18 ^{(beer, wine and cider)}	Ordinance No. 34 of 1967 Code of alcohol beverage outlets and anti-alcoholism measures Art 29
Tunisia		None	18	Law 2004-75 Article 4 prohibits entry to night clubs to those under 18 with an exception for accompanied persons between 16 and 18 in certain venues, sale of alcohol beverages to whom is prohibited.
Uganda		None	18	It is prohibited for any licensee to sell, serve or supply alcohol beverages to anyone under the age of 18 years.
Western Sahara		None		
Zambia		18; 16 ^{(traditional beer)}		It is prohibited for any person with a liquor license, to sell, serve or supply alcohol beverages to anyone under 18 years of age. Before the Liquor Licensing Act was enacted in 2011, the minimum age to sell, serve and supply alcohol beverages was 14 years.
Zimbabwe		None	18 (except with parent or guardian consent)	Liquor Act Article 116 Prohibited conduct by persons in general (1) No person shall— ... (l) being a person to whom in terms of this Act the sale of liquor is prohibited, purchase or attempt to purchase liquor in contravention of such provision; .... (o) sell, lend, give, supply or deliver, or offer so to do, any liquor to any person under the age of eighteen years except with the consent of the parent or guardian of that person. Children's Act Section 78 – It is prohibited for any person to sell, lend, give, supply, deliver or offer alcohol beverages to any child under the age of 16 years, except upon production of a written order signed by the parent or guardian of the child known to such person. The police has the duty to seize any alcohol beverage in the possession of a child under the age of 16 years without a written consent of the parents or legal guardian.

== Americas ==
In Central America, the Caribbean, and South America the legal drinking age and legal purchase age varies from 0 to 20 years (see table below). In South America in particular, the legal purchase age is 18 years, with two exceptions:

- In Paraguay, the legal drinking age and purchase age is 20 years.
- In Guyana, minors aged 16 or 17 may consume a glass of beer or wine in a restaurant provided they buy a meal.

In North America the legal drinking age and legal purchase age varies from 18 to 21 years:

- In Mexico, the drinking age is 18 in all states.
- In the United States, the minimum legal age to purchase alcoholic beverages is mainly 21 years of age; the two exceptions are Puerto Rico and the Virgin Islands where the age is 18. The legal drinking age varies by state, and many states have no age requirements for supervised drinking with one's parents or legal guardians.
- In Canada, most provinces have a minimum age of 19 years to buy or consume alcohol, while in Alberta, Manitoba, and Quebec, the minimum age is 18 years. Several provinces permit minors to consume alcohol if it was served to them by their parents/guardians, and it is consumed under their supervision in their home. For further information see Alcoholic drinks in Canada § Age.

In the late 20th century, much of North America changed its minimum legal drinking ages (MLDAs) as follows:

In the 1970s, provincial and state policy makers in Canada and the United States moved to lower MLDAs (which were set at 21 years in most provinces/territories and states) to coincide with the jurisdictional age of majority — typically 18 years of age.... As a result, MLDAs were reduced in all Canadian provinces [and] in more than half of US states. In Canada, however, two provinces, Ontario [in 1979] and Saskatchewan [in 1976], quickly raised their subsequent MLDAs from 18 to 19 years in response to a few studies demonstrating an association between the lowered drinking age and increases in alcohol-related harms to youth and young adults, including increases in motor vehicle accidents (MVAs) and alcohol intoxication among high school students. Following MLDA reductions in the US, research in several states provided persuasive evidence of sharp increases in rates of fatal and nonfatal MVAs appearing immediately after the implementation of lower drinking ages. These scientific findings galvanized public pressure on lawmakers to raise MLDAs and, in response, the federal government introduced the National Minimum Drinking Age Act of 1984, which imposed a reduction of highway funds for states if they did not increase their MLDA to 21 years. All states complied and implemented an MLDA of 21 years by 1988.

Country	State/ region/ province	De jure		Notes
Country	State/ region/ province	Drinking age	Purchase age	Notes
Anguilla		None	18	It is prohibited to sell or serve alcohol drinks to anyone under the age of 18 years. Violating the regulation is punished with a $9,600 fine.
Antigua and Barbuda		None	16 (on premises) None (off premises)	The sale and distribution of alcohol to a person under 16 years of age, and purchase by persons under 16 years of age, for consumption in licensed premises are prohibited. ID is rarely requested.
Argentina		None	18	Drinking age is rarely enforced. ID is almost never requested.
Bahamas		18		It is prohibited for any adult to sell, serve or supply any alcohol beverage to a child (defined as anyone under the age of 18 years). The law provides an exception to treat an illness in urgent cases or upon order by a medical doctor.
Barbados		None	18	It is prohibited to sell or serve any alcohol beverage to anyone under the age of 18 years. Previously 16, the President of the Barbados Road Safety Association pushed to raise the drinking age to 18 years because the law was often violated.
Belize		18		Drinking age is rarely enforced. ID is almost never requested.
Bermuda		18		It is prohibited to sell or serve any alcohol beverage to a child under the age of 18 years.
Bolivia		None	18	It is prohibited to sell or serve alcohol beverages to minors under the age of 18 years. Law 259 Against the Sale and Consumption of Alcoholic Beverages (2012) Article 20
Brazil		18		It is prohibited to sell, serve or supply any alcohol beverage to a person under 18 years of age. The presidential law enacted on 17 March 2015 made any violation of the law a criminal offence. Any adult person selling, serving, giving or supplying alcohol beverages to a minor is punished with imprisonment of 2 to 4 years, a fine of R$3.000 to R$10.000 and a ban to operate any business selling or serving alcohol.
British Virgin Islands		16		It is prohibited to sell or to supply alcohol to anyone under the age of 16. ID is rarely requested.
Canada	Alberta; Manitoba; Quebec	18		In Alberta no person may give or sell or permit any person to give or sell liquor to a minor in licensed premises. In Manitoba a person must not give, sell or otherwise supply liquor to a minor. The law provides exceptions for a doctor, dentist, pharmacist or other health care professional for medical purposes; for sacramental purposes and by the parent, guardian, spouse or common-law partner, if it is given or supplied in a residence. In Quebec the law prohibits the sale of alcohol beverages to a minor under the age of 18 years.
Canada	Ontario; Saskatchewan; British Columbia; Newfoundland and Labrador; Nova Scotia; New Brunswick; Prince Edward Island; Northwest Territories; Yukon; Nunavut	19		Ontario's Liquor Licence Act permits the supply and consumption of liquor to those under the age of 19. However, supplying a person under the age of 19 is restricted to the person's parent or legal guardian, and may only occur in a residence or in a private place of the parent or legal guardian. A person under the age of 19 who was supplied liquor in this manner is permitted to consume the liquor only in the place it was supplied.
Cayman Islands		18		It is prohibited to sell, serve or supply alcohol beverages to anyone under the age of 18 years. It is also prohibited for any minor to buy, attempt to buy or consume alcohol beverages. Violation of the law is punished with a fine of five thousand dollars, and the court may, if the offence was committed by the licensee, order that the licensee shall forfeit his licence and that no licence may be issued to that person for a period not exceeding ten years from the date of his conviction.
Chile		18		The minimum age is 18 to enter an enclosure that sells alcohol beverages. Selling alcohol to a minor may incur a fine. One must provide identification upon request. Residents of Chile over the age of 18 must carry their Chilean identification card issued by the Civil Registry and Identification Service at all times.
Colombia		None	18	The law prohibits the sale of alcohol to a minor (anyone under the age of 18 years). It is not prohibited for minors to buy, attempt to buy or consume alcohol.
Costa Rica		None	18	The law prohibits the sale of alcohol to a minor (anyone under the age of 18 years). Selling alcohol to a minor will be punished with a fine equivalent to ten basic salaries. Whoever permits minors to maintain in any establishment which main purpose is to sell alcohol beverages, will be sanctioned with a fine equivalent to five salaries. It is not prohibited for minors to buy, attempt to buy or consume alcohol.
Cuba		None	16	The penal code prohibits any adult to induce any young person under the age of 16 years, to habitually consume alcohol beverages. However this means that de facto anyone selling, serving or supplying alcohol should check if the buyer has attained the age of 16 years. In most cases this law is not strictly enforced.
Dominica		None	16	Laws of Dominica Liquor Licences Act Chapter 70:03, Part IV, Sec 15(f)
Dominican Republic		None	18	
Ecuador		None	18	It is prohibited to sell alcohol beverages to a minor under the age of 18 years of age. The law obligates establishments to place a visible notice at the point of sale and to check identification to enforce the law. However it is not prohibited for minors to buy, attempt to buy or consume alcohol.
El Salvador		None	18	It is strictly prohibited to sell or serve alcohol beverages to a minor under the age of 18 years. Violation of the law is punished with ₡25,000.00 and if convicted once more the license will be suspended for a period of six months. It is legal for minors to buy, attempt to buy and consume alcohol.
Falkland Islands		18		It is prohibited for any adult to sell, give or provide alcohol to a minor under the age of 18 years in any public place or licensed premises. Parents may permit their children to consume alcohol on private premises. Minors consuming alcohol in public are committing a criminal offence. The law provides exceptions for the consumption of alcohol by minors for prescription of or at the direction of a government medical officer or in the course of the administration of Holy Communion according to the rites of any Christian denomination.
Grenada		None	16; None (off-premise)	Chapter 174 Liquor Dealers' Licenses Act (1988), accessible through the Laws of Grenada Portal
Guatemala		None	18	It is prohibited to sell, serve or supply any alcohol drink to a minor under 18 years of age on any establishment or in the street.
Guyana		None	18; 16 (on-premise for wine or malt liquor with a meal)	It is prohibited to sell or serve alcohol to a person under 18 years of age. The law provides an exception for minors aged 16 and 17, if they consume a glass of beer, wine or cider with a meal in a restaurant. Otherwise attempting to buy alcohol or buying alcohol as a minor is an offence.
Haiti		None	None (at national level)	In the capital Port-au-Prince, it is prohibited to sell or serve alcohol to minors under 18 years old from 17 May 2017. Vendors are required to check identification. The Senate voted on a proposed Law on the protection of minors from alcohol beverages, to establish a legal purchase age of 18 and related implementation measures, in December 2012. The law has not yet been approved and enacted. Law prohibiting minors entry to entertainment venues Article 1 prohibits those under the age of 16 from entering cinemas and theaters (except during children's programming), clubs, cafes, or venues licensed to sell alcohol beverages.
Honduras		None	18	Law for Police Enforcement and Social Coexistence Decree 226 (2001) Article 68 bans the sale of alcohol to minors; The definition of punishable gang activity for minors aged 12–18 includes drinking alcohol beverages in public places (Art 90–91). Code of Children and Adolescents Decree 73 (1996)
Jamaica		None	18	It is prohibited to sell or serve any alcohol beverage to a child (which is defined as anyone under the age of 18 years).
Mexico		18		All Mexican states prohibit the sale of alcohol to any person under 18 years old. Identification is required for age verification. Some states may allow minors to consume alcoholic beverages with parental consent.
Nicaragua		None	18	
Panama		None	18	
Paraguay		None	20	The Law 6316 (2019) raised the drinking age from 18 to 20.
Peru		None	18	
Saint Kitts and Nevis		None	18	Liquor Licences Act Sec 32(f)
Saint Lucia		None	16	Chapter 13.17 Liquor Licence Act Art 37
Saint Vincent and the Grenadines		None	16	Chapter 342 Liquor License Act (1990), Sections 27 and 28
Trinidad and Tobago		None	18	It is prohibited to sell, serve or supply alcohol beverages to child under the age of 18 years. It is also prohibited for an adult to send a child to buy alcohol on behalf. It is not prohibited for children to buy or consume alcohol.
Turks and Caicos Islands		None	18	It is prohibited to serve or sell liquor to a young person under the age of eighteen years. Minors under the age of sixteen years may not present in a licensed premises mainly serving and selling alcohol beverages.
United States	(50 states and Washington, D.C.)	21	21	The National Minimum Drinking Age Act requires all states and territories to have a minimum purchasing age of 21 or lose 8% of their federal highway funding. The act does not apply to the age of alcohol consumption (i.e., states may allow alcohol consumption by those under 21 years of age without penalty). Exceptions to the drinking age are governed by state law. Some states do not allow those under the legal drinking age to be present in liquor stores or in bars (usually, the difference between a bar and a restaurant is that food is served only in the latter). Only a few states prohibit minors and young adults from consuming alcohol in all private settings. The National Institute on Alcohol Abuse and Alcoholism maintains a database that details state-level regulations on consumption and sale age limits. See also: Minor in Possession and List of alcohol laws of the United States
United States	Puerto Rico	18		Law 118 Penalties for Provision of Alcoholic Beverages to Minors under 18 years of age (1984)
United States	United States Virgin Islands	18		
Uruguay		None	18	Selling alcohol to minors under the age of 18 is prohibited, with fines between 50 and 200 Unidades Reajustables (UY$89,000-355,000 or US$2,000-8,000 as of January 2025). Consumption and purchase by minors is not prohibited.
Venezuela		None	18	

=== United States ===
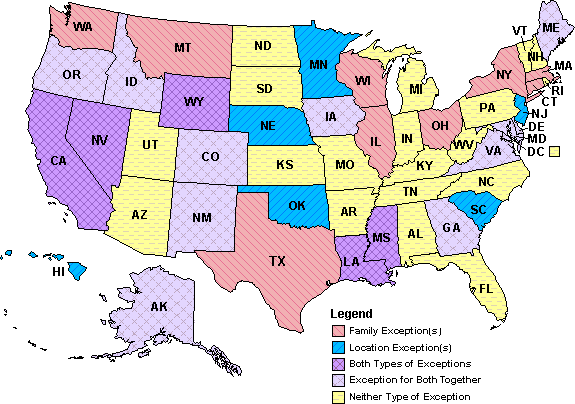
Exceptions to the minimum age of 21 for drinking alcohol in the United States, as of 1 January 2007

In the United States, the minimum legal age to purchase alcoholic beverages has mainly been 21 years of age since shortly after the passage of the National Minimum Drinking Age Act in 1984. The two exceptions are Puerto Rico and the Virgin Islands where the age is 18. The legal drinking age varies by state, and many states have no age requirements for supervised drinking with one's parents or legal guardians.

Despite a rekindled national debate in 2008 on the established drinking age (initiated by several university presidents), a Fairleigh Dickinson University PublicMind poll found in September 2008 that 76% of New Jerseyans supported leaving the legal drinking age at 21 years. No significant differences emerged when considering gender, political affiliation, or region. However, parents of younger children were more likely to support keeping the age at 21 (83%) than parents of college-age students (67%).

Seventeen states (Arkansas, California, Connecticut, Florida, Kentucky, Maryland, Massachusetts, Mississippi, Missouri, Nevada, New Hampshire, New Mexico, New York, Oklahoma, Rhode Island, South Carolina, and Wyoming) and the District of Columbia have laws against possession of alcohol by minors, but they do not prohibit its consumption by minors.

Fourteen states (Alaska, Colorado, Delaware, Illinois, Louisiana, Maine, Minnesota, Missouri, Montana, Ohio, Oregon, Texas, Wisconsin, and Virginia) specifically permit minors to drink alcohol given to them by their parents or by someone entrusted by their parents.

Many states also permit the drinking of alcohol under the age of 21 for religious or health reasons.

Puerto Rico, a territory of the United States, has maintained a drinking age of 18.

United States customs laws stipulate that no person under the age of 21 may bring any type or quantity of alcohol into the country.

== Asia ==
Country	De jure		Notes
Country	Drinking age	Purchase age	Notes
Afghanistan	Prohibited for all ages		The country enforces a policy of absolute prohibition on alcohol, based on its interpretation of Sharia law. With the Taliban regime's return to power, restrictions and punishments have become even more severe and integrated into the country's security structure.
Armenia	None	18	There are no laws mandating alcohol vendors to ID potential underage drinkers. ID checks are very rarely, if ever, carried out Criminal Code the Republic of Armenia (2003), Article 166: "Involvement, by a person who reached 18 years, of a child into regular use of alcohol drinks... is punished with correctional labor for up to 1 year, or with arrest for the term of 1–2 months, or with imprisonment for the term of 5 years"
Azerbaijan	None	18	Law No. 499-IG on Children's Rights (1998)
Bahrain	21		
Bangladesh	21	21 (for non-Muslims and foreigners) (Muslims require medical prescription for purchasing)	In 2021, reforms were introduced to alcohol regulations, for the first time a minimum age was defined, 21 years was chosen. Muslims can consume alcohol if they obtain a medical prescription.
Bhutan	None	18	
Brunei	Prohibited (for Muslims and public consumption); 17 (for non-Muslims' private residence consumption)	Prohibited for all ages	Non-Muslims over 17 years of age are allowed to import alcohol not to exceed maximum total volume 2 litres of liquor and 12 cans of beer at 330 mL for personal use, once in 48 hours. This alcohol must be "stored and consumed at the place of residence of the importer" and is "not to be given, transferred or sold to another person.".
Cambodia	None		The Health Ministry drafted a law to regulate the sale and consumption of alcohol in June 2015, with emphasis on establishing a minimum legal purchase age of 21 and preventing underage drinking. The draft law has not yet been enacted.
China	None	18	Law of the People's Republic of China on the Protection of Minors (2006 Revision) [Revised in 2012] Ministry of Commerce Decree No. 25 (2006)
Cyprus	17	18	It is prohibited to sell or serve alcohol to anyone under the age of 18 years, and for those under 17 years old to consume alcohol beverages.
Georgia	None	18	Under the Law on Protecting Minors from Harmful Influences 2001 the sale of alcohol beverages to minors is prohibited. Juvenile Justice Code (2015) Article 3 defines minors as those under 18.
Hong Kong	None	18	Private drinking is also not regulated.
India	18–25 (varies by jurisdiction); 21 is the legal drinking age in the majority of the states of India		Main article: Alcohol laws of India 18 in Andaman and Nicobar Islands, Andhra Pradesh, Goa, Himachal Pradesh, Karnataka, Puducherry, Rajasthan, and Sikkim. 21 in Arunachal Pradesh, Assam, Chandigarh, Chhattisgarh, Dadra and Nagar Haveli and Daman and Diu, Delhi, Haryana, Jammu and Kashmir, Jharkhand, Kerala, Ladakh, Madhya Pradesh, Mizoram, Odisha, Tamil Nadu, Telangana, Tripura, Uttarakhand, Uttar Pradesh, and West Bengal. 25 in Maharashtra, Meghalaya and Punjab. Consumption of alcohol is prohibited in the states of Bihar, Gujarat, Lakshadweep, Manipur, and Nagaland.
Indonesia	21; Prohibited in Banda Aceh and Papua		Prohibited in Banda Aceh and Papua; 21 elsewhere for both on- and off-premise sale. According to Minister of Trade Regulation No. 20 Year 2014, Qanun Laws of Aceh No. 6 Year 2014, and Regional Regulation of Papua Province No.15 Year 2013.
Iran	Prohibited for all ages		There is a ban on alcohol, but religious minorities may purchase small amounts from shops owned by the same religious minority.
Iraq	Prohibited for all ages		Starting in 2023, the Iraqi federal government implemented a nationwide ban on alcohol, formally making the import, production, and sale of alcoholic beverages illegal across most of the country. 18 is the minimum age to consume alcohol in Iraqi Kurdistan.
Israel	No limit in private places, 18 in public spaces	18	Israel law prohibits selling or serving alcohol to minors. Minors are prohibited to drink alcohol in public places and the police may confiscate alcohol drinks from them.
Japan	20		Majority lowered to 18 as of April 2022, but drinking age still stays at 20.
Jordan	18		Instructions issued by the Ministry of Interior Concerning Liquor Store Permits (2010), Article 6
Kazakhstan	None	21	Law 235 of 2014 Code of Administrative Offences Section 200
Kuwait	Prohibited for all ages		Law No. 46 (1964)
Kyrgyzstan	None	18	Law No.269 Government Regulation of the Production and Sale of Alcohol (2009), Article 13.2
Lebanon	None	18	Penal Code (1943), Articles 625–626 (promulgated by Legislative Decree No. 340 (2011) According to a global school health study, 40% of minors over 13 drink alcohol and up to 25% buy it from stores.
Macau	None	18	Private drinking is also not regulated.
Malaysia	None	Restricted to non-Muslims; Prohibited for Muslims; 21 for non-Muslims	Food Act 1983 Food Regulations (1985) Regulation 361 (2014) and Food (Amendment) Regulations 2016 Increased from 18 to 21 in December 2017, effective 16 October 2018. Anyone caught selling to persons under 21 can be fined up to RM10,000 and jailed up to 2 years. Malaysian identity cards display the word "ISLAM" if the holder is Muslim (and otherwise blank if the holder is non-Muslim) on the bottom right corner, which allows enforcement of the religion-based sales restriction.
Maldives	Restricted to tourists Prohibited for citizens 18 for tourists		Sale of alcohol is limited to tourist resorts. It is prohibited to sell alcohol to local Maldivians
Mongolia	21 / 18 with parent consent	21	Those under 21 are prohibited from drinking alcohol; parents and guardians are prohibited from supplying alcohol to those under 18.
Myanmar	None	18	Child Law (1993) Art 65 Excise Act (1958) Art 40(7)
Nepal	None	18	A policy has reportedly been adopted that would make the legal purchase age 21. However, there are exceptions to underage consumption for purposes of religious ceremonies.
North Korea	18		This law is often not enforced.
Oman	21		Residents need personal liquor licenses to consume alcohol in their private residences.
Pakistan	Prohibited (for Muslims); 21 (for non-Muslims)		Prohibited for Muslims. Purchase age for Non-Muslims is 21.
Palestine	18 in West Bank Prohibited in Gaza Strip		Alcohol consumption is prohibited in the Gaza Strip.
Philippines	None	18	Minors (defined as under 18 years old) are prohibited to purchase alcohol and adults are prohibited to purchase or provide alcohol to minors. Minors are not prohibited to consume alcohol. Act Regulating the Access of Minors to Alcohol Section 4
Qatar	Prohibited (for Muslims); 21 (for non-Muslims)	21	Muslims are allowed to purchase alcohol but not consume it. Only residents with a liquor license from the Qatar Distribution Company (owned by Qatar Airways) are allowed to purchase alcohol outside of hotels and restaurants and must make a minimum of QAR 4000 per month.
Saudi Arabia	Prohibited for all ages		Drinking or possessing alcohol is prohibited in the Kingdom of Saudi Arabia. Persons who drink or possess alcohol are subject to arrest and trial. Punishments range from heavy fines, lengthy prison terms and whippings.
Singapore	None; 18 (at licensed premises)	18	It is prohibited to sell alcohol to those under 18. Anyone caught selling, furnishing or acquiring alcohol in any licensed premise to persons below 18 can be fined up to $10,000. It is also prohibited for minors to purchase, or attempt to purchase alcohol from any licensed premises, in which the minors can also be fined up to $10,000. However, the authorities rarely enforced this on minors. It is technically legal for minors to possess and consume alcohol at home and in public (not in any licensed premises) as there is no law prohibiting it. It is also technically legal for someone to purchase alcohol and pass it to minors outside the store or licensed premise.
South Korea	None	19	The age limit for alcohol is 19 calculated by the year of birth. This means that an 18-year-old will be legally allowed to purchase and consume alcohol if they will be turning 19 that year. For example, two persons born on 1 January 2007 and 31 December 2007 both turned 19 years of age at the same time on 1 January 2026 and hence, both of them are considered to be of legal age to purchase and consume alcohol on and after that date, despite the latter being only 18 years and 1 day old based on western age. The method of calculating the legal age for alcohol slightly differs from Korean age reckoning in which another one year will be added to the person's age, whereas this method only doesn't take into account the month and day of birth but only the year instead. On 28 June 2023, the law that requires measuring age in the western way came into force. However, the previous system to determine the age to drink alcohol will be maintained.
Sri Lanka	None	21 (for men) prohibited (for women)	Sri Lanka is the only country which has banned the purchase of alcohol based on gender.
Syria	18		
Taiwan	18		Parents, guardians, and others taking care of people under 18 shall not supply alcohol to them or risk administrative fines of 10000 to 50000 new Taiwan dollars (Art 55). No person shall supply alcohol to anyone under the age of 18 (Art 91).
Tajikistan	None / 20	18	Sale to minors under 18 years old is prohibited by Article 12 of Law No. 451 on State Regulation of Production and Turnover of Ethyl Alcohol and Alcohol Products. Parents are required to forbid their children who have not reached age 20 to consume alcohol beverages.
Thailand	None	20	The Alcoholic Beverage Control Act of 2008 increased the drinking age in Thailand from 18 to 20, private drinking is not regulated in private locations.
Turkey	18		See also: Alcohol laws of Turkey
Turkmenistan	None	21; Prohibited in airports and stores	Law on Prevention of the Harmful Impact of Alcohol 2018 Art. 22-2; Law no Trade Art. 33; Code of Administrative Offences Art. 315, 356
United Arab Emirates	18 in Ras Al Khaimah; 21 in Dubai, Abu Dhabi, and all Northern Emirates except in Sharjah where alcohol consumption is banned	21; Completely prohibited in Sharjah	In November 2020, Drinking became legal in UAE without requiring a license and regardless of the religion. Previously, expatriate non-Muslim residents had to request a liquor permit to purchase alcohol beverages, but it was prohibited for such holders to provide drinks to others. The legal age for drinking alcohol is 18 in Ras Al Khaimah; 21 in Dubai, Abu Dhabi, Fujairah, Ajman, Umm Al Quwain. Alcohol consumption is prohibited in Sharjah. It is a punishable offence to drink, or to be under the influence of alcohol, in public.
Uzbekistan	None	21	In 2023, President Shavkat Mirziyoyev signed a law prohibiting the sale of alcohol and nicotine products to those under 21 years of age, increasing it from 20 years.
Vietnam	18		Decree 94/2012/ND-CP on Liquor Production and Trading (2012), Article 19.7
Yemen	Prohibited for all ages		Exception is in Aden Region where it's legal for 21 and up

== Europe ==
Laws banning minors from consuming alcohol in public/private: Minimum age to consume alcohol in public and private Minimum age to consume alcohol in public No minimum age to consume alcohol in public or private

Most countries in Europe have set 18 as the minimum age to purchase alcohol. Although Austria, Belgium, Denmark, Germany, Gibraltar, Liechtenstein, Luxembourg, Malta, Portugal and Switzerland (except Ticino) maintain a minimum purchase age below 18 years, minors are permitted either full or limited access to alcohol. In 2005, 2007 and 2015 harmonization at the European Union level toward a minimum purchase age of 18 was discussed, but not agreed.

Timeline of changes to drinking/purchase age or laws restricting the access to alcohol for minors:

- In 2002 the Spanish autonomous communities of Madrid, Valencia and Catalonia raised their minimum purchase age to 18 years. Previously, Valencia and Madrid had a minimum purchase age of 16 years, and in Catalonia minors aged 16 or 17 could purchase alcohol up to 23% ABV on- and off-premise.
- In 2004 Denmark raised its off-premise purchase age from 15 to 16 years.
- In November 2005 Switzerland passed its Food and Commodities Regulation (German: Lebensmittel- und Gebrauchsgegenständeverordnung), introducing a ban on alcohol sales to anyone under the age of 16. The Alcohol Law (German: Alkoholgesetz) passed in 1980 requires a minimum age of 18 years for the retail sale of distilled spirits. Therefore, it is prohibited to sell fermented alcohol (e.g. beer, wine, sparkling wine or cider) to anyone under the age of 16, and any distilled alcohol beverages to anyone under the age of 18 years. The canton of Ticino has a cantonal law since 1989 that makes the purchase age limit for all alcohol beverages 18 years.
- In 2006 the Spanish autonomous community Castile and León raised its minimum purchase age from 16 to 18 years.
- In late 2006, Gibraltar lawmakers passed the Children and Young Persons (Alcohol, Tobacco and Gaming) Act 2006, which raised the minimum purchase age from 16 to 18 years. But the new law made an exception: minors aged 16 or 17 can purchase and consume beer, wine or cider under 15% ABV on-premise, and pre-packed containers of an alcohol strength not exceeding 5.5% ABV (e.g. alcopops).
- In 2009 France raised its minimum purchase age to 18 years, and fines were increased for selling or serving alcohol to a minor (up to €7,500). Previously, the minimum age was 16 years for off-premise and on-premise purchases of low-alcohol beverages (up to 3% ABV) such as wine, beer, cider, perry, mead, crème de cassis and juices from fermented fruits or vegetables that contain 1.2 to 3° alcohol, natural sweet wines from controlled cultivation and 18 for higher-ABV beverages.
- In October 2009, the government of Malta passed a new law raising its drinking and purchase age from 16 to 17 years.
- In 2010 the Spanish autonomous community of Galicia raised its minimum purchase age from 16 to 18 years.
- In 2011 Denmark passed a law raising the minimum age for off-premise sale of alcohol beverages of >16.5% ABV to 18 years of age. The minimum age to purchase alcohol beverages of <16.5% ABV remains 16.
- In March 2012 Moldova raised the minimum purchase age to 18, from 16 previously.
- Italy raised its minimum purchase age from 16 to 18 in 2012. Previously Italy did not have a purchase age for off-premise sales, and the minimum age of 16 years for on-premise sales was not well enforced.
- As of 1 January 2014, the minimum legal purchase and consumption age was raised from 16 to 18 in the Netherlands. Previously young people over the age of 16 could purchase and consume alcohol beverages of <15% ABV, and those aged 18 and over could purchase all alcohol beverages.
- As of March 2015, the Spanish autonomous community of Asturias raised its drinking age from 16 to 18 years. Asturias was Spain's last community with a drinking age of 16 years. The new law brings the drinking age into line with the rest of Spain, with the exception of Balearic Islands where no purchase age limit is set.
- In 2013 the government of Portugal restricted alcohol sales to young people: distilled spirits cannot be sold to anyone under the age of 18, and other alcohol beverages (e.g. beer, wine, or cider) cannot be sold to anyone under the age of 16. Previously the minimum age for all alcohol beverages was 16 years. As of December 2015, Portugal harmonized its minimum drinking age to 18 years across all beverage types. Previously the purchase age was 16 years for low-alcohol beverages such as beer, wine or cider.
- As of 1 January 2018, Lithuania raised its minimum drinking age from 18 to 20 years.
- From January 2019 the federal states of Austria decided to align their drinking and purchase ages. The states Burgenland, Lower Austria and Vienna therefore raised their age limits for alcohol beverages containing spirits to 18. Prior to 2019 these states had a general drinking and purchase age of 16 years. The sale and consumption of beer, wine and other fermented alcohol beverages is now prohibited to children and young people under the age of 16 years, and the sale and consumption of spirits to minors under the age of 18 years is prohibited throughout Austria.

Country	Administrative division	De jure				Notes
Country	Administrative division	Drinking age		Purchase age		Notes
Country	Administrative division	Private	Public	On-premise	Off-premise	Notes
Albania		None	18	18		The sale of alcohol beverage in bars, restaurants or other licensed premises, as well as other points of sale, is prohibited to minors under the age of 18 years. Vendors and operators of licensed premises are required to post a clearly legible notice in A4 format stating "Ndalohet shitja e alkoolit personave nën 18 vjeç" (It is prohibited to sell alcohol beverages to people under 18 years). Consumption by those under age 18 in public places is prohibited.
Andorra		None	18	18		Selling, serving or supplying alcohol beverages is prohibited as well as public consumption of alcohol beverage by minors under the age of 18 years.
Austria		None	16 ^{(beer, wine and cider)} 18 ^{(distilled beverages)}			The age limits are set out by the legislation of each federal state but were harmonized in January 2019. Carinthia also requires 16-18-year-olds to maintain a blood alcohol level below 0.05%.
Belarus		None		18		
Belgium		None		18 for distilled beverages of higher than 1.2%ABV and fermented beverages of higher than 22%ABV 16 for other alcohol beverages		Since 10 January 2010, it is prohibited to "sell, serve, or offer" any distilled alcohol beverages to those under the age of 18 or any alcohol beverage to those under 16. Previously, it was prohibited to sell alcohol drinks to under-16s, but accompanying adults could buy drinks for them.
Bosnia and Herzegovina		None		18		Selling alcohol to a minor under the age of 18 years is an offence. The law does not prohibit minors from buying, attempting to buy or consuming alcohol.: Law on Public Peace and Order (2015) Article 25 prohibits providing alcohol beverages to minors.; Law on Internal Trade (2010), Article 10 prohibits the sale in the retail trade of alcohol beverages to persons under 18 years of age.
Bulgaria		None		18		It is prohibited to sell or offer alcohol beverages to anyone under the age of 18.
Croatia		None		18		It is prohibited to sell or serve alcohol to anyone under 18 years of age. There is no minimum age to buy or consume alcohol by law.
Czech Republic		None		18		It is prohibited to provide alcohol to minors but consumption itself is not prohibited by law.
Denmark		None		18	16 ^{(beverages of up to 6% ABV)} 18 ^{(beverages over 6% ABV)}	While there is no age requirement for drinking alcohol beverages in Denmark, there are laws that prohibit minors from buying alcohol from on-premise and off-premise outlets. Since 1 April 2025, beverages with an alcohol content of more than 6 percent have been illegal to sell to anyone under the age of 18. The minimum age to buy lighter alcoholic beverages remains 16. If a shop or bar fails to ask for an ID card and is identified as having sold alcohol to an underage person, it is subject to a fine. A national ID card, obtained in the local town hall, can serve as age verification. This card is rarely used though since a passport or driver's license is more commonly used. Both the legal drinking and purchasing age in the Faroe Islands is 18.
Estonia		18		18		It is prohibited to sell, serve or supply alcohol beverages to anyone under the age of 18 years. Alcohol found in possession of any child can be confiscated by the police.
Finland		18 ^{(1.2–22% ABV)} 20 ^{(>22% ABV)}		18	18 ^{(1.2–22% ABV)} 20 ^{(>22% ABV)}	All major grocery chains have implemented a policy to ask for ID if the customer looks under 30. Stores may refuse to sell alcohol if the customer is accompanied by a minor, or if proxy purchasing is suspected. Purchasing alcohol on behalf of a minor is a criminal offence. Police may search minors in public places and confiscate or destroy any alcohol beverages in their possession. Incidents are reported to the legal guardian and child protective services, who may intervene with child welfare procedures. In addition, those aged 15 or above are subject to a fine. In private, offering alcohol to a minor is considered a criminal offence if it results in drunkenness and the act can be deemed reprehensible as a whole, considering the minor's age, degree of maturity and other circumstances.
France		None, minors are under parental authority up to 18 years old, and the parent must even remain present if they offer alcohol to their child under the age of 16. In addition, making a minor drink until intoxication is an offense.		18		France has no explicitly stated consumption age, but selling alcohol beverages to a minor (under 18) is prohibited and can be fined 7500 euros.
Germany		None	14 ^{(beer, wine and cider if accompanied)} 16 ^{(beer, wine and cider)} 18 ^{(spirits and foods containing spirits above negligible amounts)}			It is prohibited to sell, serve or supply fermented alcohol beverages (beer, wine, cider and sparkling wine) to anyone under 16 years of age. However this age limit drops down to 14 if a minor is accompanied by a parent or legal guardian. It is generally prohibited to serve, sell or supply any beverage containing spirits and foods containing spirits above negligible amounts, to anyone under the age of 18 years. Violation of the "Protection of Young Persons Act" can be punished with imprisonment up to 10 years. See also: Alcohol laws in Germany See also: Protection of Young Persons Act (Germany)
Gibraltar		None		16 ^{(beer, wine and cider)} 18 ^{(spirits)}	18	It is prohibited to sell alcohol drinks to anyone under the age of 18, other than the following two exceptions. The minimum age to be served in licensed premises is 16 if: The alcohol beverage is beer, wine or cider below 15% ABV, or; The alcohol beverage is served in a bottle, or a pre-packaged container below 5.5% ABV.
Greece		None	18	18		In 2008, the consumption of alcohol beverages was prohibited for minors in public. However, the law does not apply to private events or private premises. However, the law is rarely enforced with authorities reporting high numbers of teen alcohol consumption yearly. ID checks are rare.
Hungary		None		18		
Iceland		None		20		Possession or consumption of alcohol by people under the age of 20 is not an offence, but police will contact parents of those under 18 and send a report to the child protection agency, supplying them with alcohol is an offence. Drinking in public is prohibited, though this is rarely enforced in public places.
Ireland		None	18	18		It is prohibited for minors to buy alcohol or for a third party to attempt to buy it for minors. Minors are prohibited to drink in private residences unless it is with their parent or guardian's permission.
Italy		None		18		In 2012 the then Health Minister Renato Balduzzi proposed to raise the minimum purchase age from 16 to 18. Selling alcohol to those under the age of 18 in shops carries a fine between €250 and €1000. Serving alcoholic beverages to those under 16 is a criminal offense and is punishable with prison up to one year. If the individual served is 16 or 17 it will be treated as an offense that is fined between €250 and €1000 (Legge n. 189/2013).
Kosovo		None		18		
Latvia		None		18		It is prohibited to sell or serve alcohol beverages to any minor under the age of 18 years. Persons between the ages of 18 and 25 are required to present an identity document to the retailer when purchasing alcoholic beverages, regardless of whether the retailer has requested it. There is no minimum age to consume or possess alcohol.
Liechtenstein		18 ^{(spirits and spirit-based beverages)} 16 ^{(other alcohol beverages)}				Spirits and alcopops may be sold only to people at least 18, and other alcohol beverages to people at least 16. Consumption and possession is prohibited at the same ages.
Lithuania		20		20		It is prohibited to sell, serve or supply alcohol beverages to anyone under the age of 20 years. People under the age of 20 are prohibited from consuming alcohol beverages or from possessing them. The minimum age was raised from 18 to 20 in 2018.
Luxembourg		None		16		It is prohibited to sell or serve alcohol beverages of >1.2% ABV to any person under the age of 16 years. Violation is fined €251 to €1,000.
Malta		None	17	17		Must provide identification upon request.
Moldova		None		18		It is prohibited to sell, or serve alcohol beverages to anyone under the age of 18 years. It is not prohibited for minors to buy, attempt to buy or consume alcohol.
Montenegro		None		18		
Netherlands		None	18	18		The legal age for purchase and consumption of alcohol beverages was raised from 16 to 18 in 2014. Selling alcoholic beverages to people under 18 is prohibited, while buying alcoholic beverages for someone else under the age of 18 is also prohibited.
North Macedonia		None		18		
Norway		None		18 ^{(<22% ABV)} 20 ^{(≥22% ABV)}		Alcohol possessed by minors may be confiscated as evidence. Drinking in public is prohibited, though this is rarely enforced in recreational areas.
Poland		None	None ^{(within designated drinking zones)} Prohibited ^{(elsewhere)}	18		Article 15 of The Act on Upbringing in Sobriety and Counteracting Alcoholism prohibits sale or serving of alcohol beverages to anyone under 18 and that if doubt exists as to age, sellers/servers should require ID as proof of age. Drinking in public places, with the exception of designated drinking zones, is prohibited regardless of age.
Portugal		None		18		
Romania		None		18		Whoever offers or supplies alcohol beverages to a child under the age of 14 years in an amount which is resulting death to one is punished with imprisonment for 3 to 12 years.
Russia		None		18		The legal purchase age limits are 18.
San Marino		None		16		Criminal Code Article 165
Serbia		None		18		Possession of alcohol is regulated by Article 23 of Consumer protection law which prohibits selling, serving and giving alcohol to a person under the age of 18. However, the law is loosely enforced.
Slovakia		None		18		
Slovenia		None		18		
Spain		18		18		
Sweden		None		18	None under 2.25% ABV 20 18 ^{(beer, above 2.25% ABV and below or equal to 3.5% ABV)}	See also: Alcohol in Sweden It is legal for anyone at any age to drink, but off-premise sale or supply to anyone under the age of 20 is prohibited and on-premise establishments are prohibited from serving alcohol beverages to anyone under 18. It is legal to serve an underage person alcohol in a private place, provided it's a limited amount and done in moderation. The reason for the lower limit in bars than in Systembolaget shops is that bartenders have a legal responsibility for how drunk a guest gets. Class II beer (up to 3.5% ABV), called folköl ("people's beer"), is sold in regular stores, but with the minimum purchase age of 18. Class I beer (2.25% ABV and under) has no age restriction.
Switzerland	Switzerland (federal law)	None		16 ^{(fermented beverages with up to 15% ABV and natural wines with up to 18% ABV)} 18 ^{(spirits)}		Whoever offers or supplies alcohol beverages to a child under the age of 16 years in an amount which is harmful to one's health is punished with imprisonment up to 3 years or a fine. Whoever sells or supplies spirits to a person under the age of 18 years is punished with a fine up to 10,000 CHF.
Switzerland	Ticino	None		18		Canton Ticino prohibits the selling of any type of alcohol beverage to minors under the age of 18.
Ukraine		None		18		Law No. 1824-VI on state regulation of production and turnover of ethyl, cognac and fruit, alcoholic beverages and tobacco products Article 15-3
United Kingdom	England; Wales	5 On licensed premises: 18 or 16 ^{(for beer, wine or cider with a table meal and if accompanied by adult)}		18		It is prohibited to give a child under the age of 5 alcohol, unless for medical reasons.; It is prohibited to sell alcoholic beverages to anyone under the age of 18, but 16-17 year olds may consume beer, wine, or cider on licensed premises when at a table meal with an adult who is accompanying them.; It is not illegal for under 18s to possess or consume alcohol, but the police can confiscate alcohol from under 18s in public.; Import: People over 17 are entitled to a duty-free allowance for alcohol beverages.
United Kingdom	Scotland	None	18; 16 ^{(beer, wine, cider or perry with a meal if purchased by an adult aged 18 or older)} 16 (liquor confectionery)	18		It is prohibited to sell alcoholic beverages to persons under the age of 18, and liqueur confectionery to persons under the age of 16.; The police can confiscate alcohol from those below the drinking age in public. Those aged 16–17 may consume beer, wine, cider, or perry on licensed premises with a meal.; Import: People over 17 are entitled to a duty-free allowance for alcoholic beverages.
United Kingdom	Northern Ireland	14	18	18		It is illegal for persons under 14 to be given alcohol, and then only for medical purposes.; It is prohibited to sell, serve, or offer alcohol beverages to anyone under the age of 18. Minors are prohibited to consume alcohol beverages in public and the police can confiscate alcohol from under 18s in public.
United Kingdom	United Kingdom					Under the BBPA's Challenge 21 and Challenge 25 schemes, customers attempting to buy alcohol beverages are asked to prove their age if in the retailer's opinion they look under 21 (or optionally 25) even though the law states they must be a minimum of 18. Many supermarket and off-licence chains display Challenge 21 (or Challenge 25) notices stating that they will not serve people who look under 21 (or 25) without ID.

== Oceania ==
Country	State/ region/ province	De jure		Notes
Country	State/ region/ province	Drinking age	Purchase age	Notes
Australia		18		Main article: Alcohol laws of Australia All states restrict purchasing to over 18, but exceptions may apply if accompanied by a parent or guardian. The government-supported Youth Law Australia portal offers details on consumption and supply age limits by state.
Fiji		18		The drinking age was previously 21 but was lowered to 18 in 2009.
Kiribati		21		Liquor Ordinance 1973 Art 11 Liquor (Amendment) Act 12-2005 Art 27
Marshall Islands		21		Alcoholic Beverage Control Act 1971 Art 111(i) Alcohol Restriction Act of 1994 Art 202(1)
Micronesia, Federated States of	Chuuk; Kosrae	18		
Micronesia, Federated States of	Pohnpei; Yap	21		
Nauru		21		Liquor Ordinance 1967 Art 33
New Zealand		None	18	Minimum age applies for beverages with 1.15% ABV or over; no restrictions on beverages less than 1.15% ABV. Persons under 18 may drink outside private residences or private functions if accompanied by their parent or legal guardian. Alcohol may be supplied to minors only by, or with express consent from, their parent or legal guardian.
Palau		21		It is prohibited to sell or serve any alcohol beverage to a person under 21 years of age. Minors may access a bar or licensed premises only if accompanied by a parent or legal guardian. Minors buying, consuming or attempting to buy alcohol are committing an offence. The law provides an exception for the consumption of alcohol by minors as part of a religiously recognized ceremony.
Papua New Guinea		18		It is prohibited for a minor to purchase, consume or attempt to purchase alcohol beverages. Any licence holder has to ensure that the customer who he sells or serves alcohol to, is at least 18 years of age. Violation of this law is punishable by a fine. Liquor Licensing Act (1963) Art 102–103
Samoa		21		Selling or serving alcohol to a person under the age of 21 years is punishable with a three hundred dollar fine, imprisonment for nine months, or both. "does not apply to a licensee of a food and beverage license provided that the person under the age of 21 years is under the supervision of an attending parent."
Solomon Islands		None	21	Selling or serving alcohol to a person under the age of 21 years is punishable with a three hundred dollar fine, imprisonment for nine months, or both.
Tokelau		18		
Tonga		18		Selling, serving or supplying alcohol to anyone under 18 years is prohibited. It is also prohibited for minors to buy, attempt to buy or consume alcohol in any public place and any violation of this law is punishable by a $1,000 fine.
United States	American Samoa	21		
United States	Guam	21		As of July 2010, the drinking age in the territory of Guam has been raised to 21.
United States	Northern Mariana Islands	21		
Vanuatu		18		It is unlawful to sell, serve or supply alcohol to any person under the age of 18 years. Violation of the law is fined up to VT 25,000 or by a term of imprisonment not exceeding 3 months, or by both, fine and imprisonment. Any minor under the age of 18 years, being found in possession or consumption of alcohol is fined up to VT 10,000.

== See also ==
- Age of candidacy
- Alcohol consumption by youth in the United States
- Alcohol law
- Alcoholism
- Amethyst Initiative
- Choose Responsibility
- Foundation for Advancing Alcohol Responsibility
- Gambling age
- Legal drinking age controversy (USA)
- Legal smoking age
- Mature minor doctrine
- National Minimum Drinking Age Act
- National Youth Rights Association
- Shoulder tap (alcohol)
- Voting age
- Youth rights
- Youth suffrage
- Youth
