= National Minimum Drinking Age Act =

1984 U.S. law which indirectly raised the nationwide minimum drinking age to 21

- Long title: An Act to encourage a uniform minimum drinking age of 21 to combat drugged driving, improve law enforcement and provide incentives to the states to reduce drunk driving.
- Acronyms (colloquial): NMDAA
- Enacted by: the 98th United States Congress
- Effective: July 17, 1984

Citations
- Public law: Pub. L. 98–363
- Statutes at Large: 98 Stat. 435

Codification
- Titles amended: Title 23—Highways
- U.S.C. sections created: 23 U.S.C. § 158

Legislative history
- Introduced in the House as H.R. 4616 by Glenn M. Anderson (D–CA) on January 24, 1984; Committee consideration by House Public Works and Transportation; Passed the House on April 30, 1984; Passed the Senate on June 26, 1984 (voice vote) with amendment; House agreed to Senate amendment on June 27, 1984 (unanimous consent); Signed into law by President Ronald Reagan on July 17, 1984

United States Supreme Court cases
- South Dakota v. Dole, 483 U.S. 203 (1987)

The National Minimum Drinking Age Act of 1984 (23 U.S.C. § 158) was passed by the United States Congress and was later signed into law by President Ronald Reagan on July 17, 1984. The act punished any state that allowed persons under 21 years to purchase alcoholic beverages by reducing its annual federal highway apportionment by 10 percent. The law was later amended, lowering the penalty to 8 percent from fiscal year 2012 and beyond.

Despite its name, this act did not outlaw the consumption of alcoholic beverages by those under 21 years of age, just their purchase or public possession. However, Alabama, Arkansas, Idaho, New Hampshire, and West Virginia extended the law into an outright ban. The minimum purchase and drinking ages are state laws, and most states still permit "underage" consumption of alcohol in some circumstances. In some states, no restriction on private consumption is made, while in other states, consumption is only allowed in specific locations, in the presence of consenting and supervising family members, as in the states of Colorado, Maryland, Montana, New York, Texas, Oregon, Washington, Wisconsin, and Wyoming. Some states even allow persons under 21 years of age to drink alcohol in public places, such as in Ohio, Texas and Louisiana as long as the parent or guardian consents to it and is the one that buys the alcohol and is at least 21 years old. The act also does not seek to criminalize alcohol consumption during religious occasions (e.g., communion wines, Kiddush).

The act was upheld as constitutional in 1987 by the United States Supreme Court in South Dakota v. Dole.

== History ==
Legislation concerning the legal minimum drinking age in the United States can be traced back to the days of Prohibition. In 1920, the Eighteenth Amendment to the U.S. Constitution declared it illegal to manufacture, transport, or sell intoxicating liquors. This was repealed with the passing of the Twenty-first Amendment in 1933, which was followed by the adoption of minimum legal drinking age policies in all states, with most states electing a minimum legal drinking age (MLDA) of 21. Between 1970 and 1975, 29 states lowered the MLDA from 21 to 18, 19, or 20. This was primarily due to the passing of the Twenty-sixth Amendment, which lowered the required voting age from 21 to 18.

During the 1960s, both Congress and the state legislatures came under increasing pressure to lower the minimum voting age from 21 to 18. This was in large part due to the Vietnam War, in which many young men who were ineligible to vote (or legally drink) were conscripted to fight in the war, thus lacking any means to influence the people sending them off to risk their lives. "Old enough to fight, old enough to vote," was a common slogan used by proponents of lowering the voting age. The slogan traced its roots to World War II, when President Franklin D. Roosevelt lowered the military draft age to 18. With the lowering of the voting age to 18, the minimum legal drinking age (MLDA) was similarly lowered under the notion that by being able to vote (and for males, be subject to being involuntarily drafted into the enlisted ranks of the military), one should also be able to legally consume alcoholic beverages.

However, these changes were soon followed by studies showing a significant increase in motor vehicle fatalities attributable to the decreased MLDA. In response to these findings, many states raised the minimum legal drinking age to 19 (and sometimes to 20 or 21). In 1984, the National Minimum Legal Drinking Act, written by Senator Frank Lautenberg (D-NJ) and influenced by Mothers Against Drunk Driving (MADD), required all states to set their minimum purchasing age to 21. Any state that chooses not to comply with the act would have up to 10 percent of its federal highway funds withheld.

As the MLDA was still left to the discretion of the state, the act did not violate the Twenty-first amendment which reserved the right to regulate alcohol for all responsibilities not specifically appointed to the federal government to the states. However, as the act controlled the distribution of anywhere from $8 million to $99 million, depending on the size of the state, the act gave a strong incentive for states to change the drinking age to 21. By 1995, all 50 states, two permanently inhabited territories, and D.C. were in compliance, but Puerto Rico and the Virgin Islands (and Guam until 2010) remained at 18 despite them losing 10% of federal highway funding.

Professor of law Tim Jost noted that the Roberts Court ruling in NFIB v. Sebelius, though upholding South Dakota v. Dole, had serious implications for future laws that incentivize state action.

The Court expressly distinguished South Dakota v. Dole, the drinking age case, because only a small portion of highway funds were at risk. ... There will certainly be future litigation when other federal programs are changed and all of the funding for the existing program is at risk, however.

Constitutional lawyer Adam Winkler disagrees saying

The health care decision on Medicaid is likely to be limited to its facts. ... Where a state's budget is truly dependent on federal dollars to survive, then conditional spending offers will be called into question. The health care decision doesn't purport to call into question any previous conditional spending law. And it's not likely to have much impact because there's no clear majority opinion establishing new limits.

The Conservative Party of New York opposed the passage of the law in 1984. In 2001, New York State Assembly member Félix Ortiz introduced a bill that would lower the drinking age back to 18. He cited unfairness and difficulty with enforcement as his motivations.

In 1998, the National Youth Rights Association was founded, in part, to seek to lower the drinking age back to 18. In 2004, the president of Vermont's Middlebury College, John McCardell, Jr. wrote in The New York Times that "the 21-year-old drinking age is bad social policy and terrible law" that has made the college drinking problem far worse. Groups that oppose the 21 minimum include Choose Responsibility, the Amethyst Initiative, and Students for Sensible Drug Policy.

Organizations that support upholding the 21 minimum age limit include Mothers Against Drunk Driving, American Medical Association, Centers for Disease Control and Prevention, and the American Board of Pediatrics.

A key cluster of philosophical opposition to the minimum lies in the natural human need for education and experience; young adults do not receive the opportunity to educate themselves and drink responsibly before the age of 21. A related line of thought emphasizes the importance of individual rights and freedoms. Another cluster comes from pragmatism, emphasizing the reality that young people are unlikely to stop drinking, and point to statistics on underage drinking as a reason to institute a lower drinking age, which would provide the opportunity to help "young people learn to make healthy and responsible choices". Social environmental theories are also cited; making alcohol a forbidden fruit may encourage more dangerous drinking than would occur if the drinking age were lowered. With a lower drinking age, young people would have access to "publicly moderated drinking environments", rather than "model their behavior after the excessive consumption typical of private student parties", though the perception of excessive drinking on college campuses is often overstated.

When brewing magnate Pete Coors raised the drinking age as a campaign issue during the 2004 U.S. Senate race in Colorado, Republican leaders praised his stand on states' rights but distanced themselves from apparent self-interest.

== Application on college campuses ==
College campuses across the nation continue to struggle with issues of underage drinking, despite the nationwide MLDA of 21. The National Institute on Alcohol Abuse and Alcoholism (NIAAA) took special interest in this issue, and compiled a list of recommendations for colleges to implement in order to combat underage drinking on campus. However, few schools have actually implemented these recommendations, and according to a recent study, most of the intervention programs currently in place on college campuses have proven ineffective. Underage drinking is nearly impossible to prevent on college campuses because access to alcoholic beverages is extremely easy.

Though it is not the only factor that contributes to student drinking, liquor's contraband status seems to imbue it with mystique. As a result, use and abuse of liquor is seen as sophisticated and is expected.

Of the colleges surveyed, 98% offered alcohol education programs to their students. Only 50% of surveyed colleges offered intervention programs, 33% coordinated efforts with the surrounding community to monitor illegal alcohol sales, 15% confirmed that surrounding establishments offered responsible beverage service training, and 7% restricted the number of alcohol outlets within the community. Special services for "problem drinkers" were available at 67% of the surveyed schools; 22% of the schools referred problem drinkers to off-campus resources, and 11% offered no intervention program whatsoever. 34% of the surveyed schools were located in communities that actively instituted compliance checks, but 60% of these checks occurred without university involvement. One-fifth of surveyed schools were altogether unaware of the NIAAA's recommendations.

Many factors may explain colleges' failure to implement the NIAAA's recommendations to control underage drinking on campus: a lack of university funding, a lack of time, a perceived lack of authority or jurisdiction within the community, or even a lack of interest on the part of the university, many universities even see the program as a waste of resources. Whatever the reasons may be, a multitude of options are available should colleges choose to institute programs to decrease instances of underage drinking on campus. These options include, but are not limited to, alcohol education programs, social norms campaigns, substance-free housing, individual interventions, parental notification policies, disciplinary procedures for alcohol-related violations, and amnesty policies to protect the health and safety of students.

== Effects ==
The Institute of Medicine reviewed a large number of studies on the minimum legal drinking age, including peer-reviewed academic reviews, and largely viewed the policy as a success—so much so that they argued for similar restrictions on tobacco. For example, they quote a study by Kypri and colleagues stating that "No traffic safety policy, with the possible exception of motorcycle safety helmet laws, has more evidence for its effectiveness than do the minimum legal drinking age laws." In contrast, several studies, including a 2011 review, showed data that went against the idea that raising the drinking age to 21 actually saved lives in the long run. For example, Miron and Tetelbaum (2009) found that when the federally coerced and non-coerced states were separated out, any lifesaving effect is no longer statistically or practically significant in the coerced states, and even in the voluntary-adopting states the effect does not seem to last beyond the first year or two. They also find that the 21 drinking age appears to have only a minor impact on teen drinking. There is also some evidence that traffic deaths were merely shifted from the 18-20 age group to the 21-24 age group rather than averted. Additionally, Canada, Australia, the UK, and several other nations saw similar or faster declines in traffic fatalities than the USA did since the early 1980s despite not raising their drinking ages to 21.

== See also ==
- Age of majority
- Legal age
- Legal drinking age
- Legal smoking age
- U.S. history of alcohol minimum purchase age by state
- Youth rights
