= Choose Responsibility =

American non-profit organization

Choose Responsibility is a non-profit organization in the United States, that promotes public awareness of the dangers of excessive and reckless alcohol consumption by young adults. The main goal is to lower the minimum legal drinking age by educating the public. It was founded and is directed by Dr. John McCardell, Jr., president emeritus of Middlebury College.

== Purpose ==
Choose Responsibility has examined many industrialized societies with drinking ages less than 21 but scientifically measured to have more responsible drinking habits than Americans. The organization believes that current drinking laws "infantilize" young adults and promote immature behaviors. Therefore, it promotes public policies that it believes would empower young adults age 18 to 20 to make mature decisions about the place of alcohol in their own lives. Choose Responsibility compares the results of current drinking laws to the failure of laws associated with Prohibition to maintain and enforce a reduction in alcohol use.

== Founder ==
McCardell has a PhD in history from Harvard University, and attended Johns Hopkins University and Washington and Lee University. He has two adult children; he also received the Allan Nevins Prize from the Society of American Historians.

== Board ==
Experts in several fields of research make up Choose Responsibility's board of directors.

== Projects ==
The organization promotes its views through a program of research, publication, education, and related activities. Choose Responsibility has proposed a comprehensive program that combines incentives and rewards for responsible behavior by young people, and punitive measures for irresponsible behavior (i.e. the carrot and stick approach). The organization promotes a multi-faceted approach that combines education, certification, and provisional licensing for 18- to 20-year-old high school graduates who choose to consume alcohol.

Choose Responsibility notes Vermont introduced a bipartisan bill in 2006, to attempt a program similar to that which Choose Responsibility advocates, but Vermont would lose federal highway funding if the measure were approved. The Amethyst Initiative, a project run by Choose Responsibility asks lawmakers "to consider whether the 10% highway fund 'incentive' encourages or inhibits [an informed and dispassionate] debate" Since the enactment of the National Minimum Drinking Age Act of 1984, most states allow for very few instances where someone under the age of 21 can possess or drink alcohol, and a pilot program such as what Vermont considered is not an exception that is provided for, under current federal law. The act is up for review next year.

In July 2008, McCardell and over 100 other college presidents launched the Amethyst Initiative, which calls for discussion and reconsideration of the drinking age. The project received major press coverage and both praise and criticism.
