= Glossary of alcohol (drug) terms =

This page is a list of terms related to the psychoactive drug alcohol.

== 0-9 ==
0-0-1-3

== A ==
Acamprosate
Acamprosate, sold under the brand name Campral, is a medication which reduces alcoholism cravings.
Administrative License Suspension
License suspension or revocation traditionally follows conviction for alcohol-impaired or drunk driving.
Adult Children of Alcoholics
Adult Children of Alcoholics (ACA or ACOA) founded circa 1978 is a fellowship of people who desire to recover from the effects of growing up in an alcoholic or otherwise dysfunctional family.
Al-Anon/Alateen
Al-Anon Family Groups, founded in 1951, is an international mutual aid organization for people who have been impacted by another person's alcoholism.
Alcohol
Alcohol (from the Arabic word al-kuḥl, الكحل), sometimes referred to by the chemical name ethanol, is one of the most widely used and abused psychoactive drugs in the world. It is a central nervous system (CNS) depressant, decreasing electrical activity of neurons in the brain. The World Health Organization (WHO) classifies alcohol as a toxic, psychoactive, dependence-producing, and carcinogenic substance.
Alcohol (Minimum Pricing) (Scotland) Act 2012
The Alcohol (Minimum Pricing) (Scotland) Act 2012 is an Act of the Scottish Parliament, which introduces a statutory minimum price for alcohol, initially 50p per unit, as an element in the programme to counter alcohol problems.
Alcohol abuse
Alcohol abuse encompasses a spectrum of alcohol-related substance abuse, ranging from the consumption of more than 2 drinks per day on average for men, or more than 1 drink per day on average for women, to binge drinking or alcohol use disorder.
Alcohol advertising
Alcohol advertising on college campuses
Alcohol and Native Americans
Alcohol and breast cancer
Alcohol and cancer
Alcohol and cortisol
Alcohol and pregnancy
Alcohol and sex
Alcohol and spaceflight
Alcohol and weight
Alcohol congener analysis
Alcohol consumption by youth in the United States
Alcohol consumption recommendations
Alcohol detoxification
Alcohol detoxification (also known as detox) is the abrupt cessation of alcohol intake in individuals that have alcohol use disorder. This process is often coupled with substitution of drugs that have effects similar to the effects of alcohol in order to lessen the symptoms of alcohol withdrawal. When withdrawal does occur, it results in symptoms of varying severity.
Alcohol education
Alcohol enema
Alcohol exclusion laws
Alcohol flush reaction
Alcohol in association football
Alcohol in the Bible
Alcohol inhalation
Alcohol intolerance
Alcohol intoxication
Alcohol intoxication, also known in overdose as alcohol poisoning, commonly described as drunkenness or inebriation, is the behavior and physical effects caused by a recent consumption of alcohol.
Alcohol law
Alcohol monopoly
Alcohol myopia
Alcohol myopia is a cognitive-physiological theory on alcohol use disorder in which many of alcohol's social and stress-reducing effects, which may underlie its addictive capacity, are explained as a consequence of alcohol's narrowing of perceptual and cognitive functioning.
Alcohol packaging warning messages
Alcohol packaging warning messages (alcohol warning labels, AWLs) are warning messages that appear on the packaging of alcoholic drinks concerning their health effects.
Alcohol powder
Alcohol prohibition
Alcohol server training
Alcohol tax
Alcohol tolerance
Alcohol use among college students
Alcohol use and sleep
Alcohol withdrawal syndrome
Alcohol-free zone
Alcohol-induced respiratory reactions
Alcohol-related brain damage
Alcohol-related crime
Alcohol-related dementia
Alcohol-related traffic crashes in the United States
Alcoholic beverage
Alcoholic beverage control state
Alcoholic cardiomyopathy
Alcoholic hallucinosis
Alcoholic hepatitis
Alcoholic ketoacidosis
Alcoholic liver disease
Alcoholic lung disease
Alcoholic polyneuropathy
Alcoholic spirits measure
Alcoholics Anonymous
Alcoholism
Alcoholism is the continued drinking of alcohol despite it causing problems. Some definitions require evidence of dependence and withdrawal.
Alcoholism in adolescence
Alcoholism in family systems
Alcoholism in rural Australia
Andrew Johnson alcoholism debate
Austrian syndrome
Austrian syndrome, also known as Osler's triad, is a medical condition that was named after Robert Austrian in 1957. The presentation of the condition consists of pneumonia, endocarditis, and meningitis, all caused by Streptococcus pneumoniae. It is associated with alcoholism due to hyposplenism (reduced splenic functioning) and can be seen in males between the ages of 40 and 60 years old.
Auto-brewery syndrome

== B ==
Ban on caffeinated alcoholic drinks in the United States
Bathtub gin
Beer Street and Gin Lane
Beer bong
Beer chemistry
The chemical compounds in beer give it a distinctive taste, smell and appearance.
Beer goggles
The term "beer goggles" is the phenomenon that people find other people more attractive after having consumed alcohol. The term is especially used for people who, when sober, will otherwise not be found as relatively attractive or attractive at all.
Beer mile
A beer mile is a 1-mile (1.6 km) drinking race combining running and speed drinking. Typically, the race takes place on a standard 400-metre or 1/4-mile running track.
Binge drinking
The National Institute on Alcohol Abuse and Alcoholism (NIAAA) defines binge drinking as a pattern of alcohol consumption that brings a person's blood alcohol concentration (BAC) to 0.08 percent or above. This typically occurs when men consume five or more US standard drinks, or women consume four or more drinks, within about two hours. The Substance Abuse and Mental Health Services Administration (SAMHSA) defines binge drinking slightly differently, focusing on the number of drinks consumed on a single occasion. According to SAMHSA, binge drinking is consuming five or more drinks for men, or four or more drinks for women, on the same occasion on at least one day in the past month.
Blackout
Blackout Wednesday
Blackout Wednesday (also known as Drinksgiving) refers to binge drinking on the night before the Thanksgiving holiday in the United States.
Blood alcohol content
Blood alcohol content (BAC), also called blood alcohol concentration or blood alcohol level, is a measurement of alcohol intoxication used for legal or medical purposes.
Breathalyzer
Brief intervention

== C ==
Caffeinated alcoholic drink
Calcium carbimide
Chlordiazepoxide
Christian views on alcohol
Coca wine
Coca wine is an alcoholic beverage combining wine with cocaine.
Collaborative Study on the Genetics of Alcoholism
Comparison of psychoactive alcohols in alcoholic drinks
Congener
Cyanamide

== D ==
DWI court
Delirium tremens
Denatured alcohol
Designated driver
Dionysian Mysteries
Dipsomania
Disease theory of alcoholism
Disulfiram
Drinking culture
Drinking game
Drinking in public
Drug rehabilitation
Drunk dialing
Drunk driving
Drunk driving (or drink-driving in British English) is the act of driving under the influence of alcohol.
Drunk driving in the United States
Drunk driving law by country
Drunk tank
A drunk tank is a jail cell or separate facility accommodating people who are intoxicated, especially with alcohol.
Drunken monkey hypothesis
The drunken monkey hypothesis proposes that human attraction to alcohol may derive from dependence of the primate ancestors of Homo sapiens on ripe and fermenting fruit as a dominant food source.
Drunkorexia
Drunkorexia is a colloquialism for anorexia or bulimia combined with an alcohol use disorder. The term is generally used to denote the utilization of extreme weight control methods to compensate for planned binge drinking.
Dry January
Dry July
Dry campus
Dry drunk
Dry state
Dutch courage
Dutch courage, also known as pot-valiance or liquid courage, refers to courage gained from intoxication with alcohol.

== F ==
Fetal alcohol spectrum disorder
Field sobriety testing
Flaming drink
Foundation for Advancing Alcohol Responsibility
French paradox
Fusel alcohol

== G ==
Gateway drug effect
Get Your Sexy Back
Gilbert Paul Jordan
Gin Act 1751
Gin Craze

== H ==
Hair of the dog
"Hair of the dog", short for "hair of the dog that bit you", is a colloquial expression in the English language predominantly used to refer to alcohol that is consumed as a hangover remedy (with the aim of lessening the effects of a hangover).
Hangover
Hangover remedies
Hangxiety
Hangxiety, short for hangover anxiety, is the colloquial term that refers to the anxiety some people experience during a hangover following alcohol consumption. It describes the sense of worry, stress, and unease that can occur alongside the physical symptoms of a hangover, such as headache, nausea, and fatigue. Hangxiety affects about 12% of people.
Health effects of wine
Heavy drinking
Heavy alcohol use is defined differently by various health organizations. The CDC defines "Current heavier drinker" as consuming more than 7 drinks per week for women and more than 14 drinks per week for men. Additionally, "Heavy drinking day (also referred to as episodic heavy drinking" is characterized as having 4 or more drinks on a single occasion for women and 5 or more for men, in the past year. The National Institute on Alcohol Abuse and Alcoholism (NIAAA) provides gender-specific guidelines for heavy drinking. According to NIAAA, men who consume five or more US standard drinks in a single day or 15 or more drinks within a week are considered heavy drinkers. For women, the threshold is lower, with four or more drinks in a day or eight or more drinks per week classified as heavy drinking. In contrast, the Substance Abuse and Mental Health Services Administration (SAMHSA) takes a different approach to defining heavy alcohol use. SAMHSA considers heavy alcohol use to be engaging in binge drinking behaviors on five or more days within a month. This definition focuses more on the frequency of excessive drinking episodes rather than specific drink counts.
High-functioning alcoholic
Hip flask defence
In places like the United Kingdom, a hip flask defence is a defence to an allegation of drink driving that a driver had consumed alcohol between the time of a vehicular offence, such as a traffic collision, and a breathalyser test, so that a positive result does not actually indicate that they were driving while intoxicated.
Holiday heart syndrome
Holiday heart syndrome, also known as alcohol-induced atrial arrhythmias, is a syndrome defined by an irregular heartbeat and palpitations associated with high levels of ethanol consumption.
Homebrewing
Homotaurine

== I ==
Ignition interlock device
Impact of alcohol on aging
In vino veritas
Index of alcohol-related articles
Intermittent sobriety
Intermittent sobriety refers to planned periods of abstinence from alcohol, often as part of awareness campaigns or personal health initiatives. Notable examples include:
- Dry January: An annual campaign encouraging people to abstain from alcohol for the month of January.
- Dry July: A similar initiative held in July, often with a fundraising component for cancer-related charities.
- Ocsober: An October-based challenge to abstain from alcohol.
International Beer Day
International Women's Collaboration Brew Day
International whisk(e)y day

== K ==
Khamr
Korsakoff syndrome

== L ==
Ladies' night
A ladies' night is a promotional event, often at a bar or nightclub, where female patrons pay less than male patrons for the cover charge or alcoholic beverages.
Last call
Legal drinking age in the United States
Legal drinking age
Lifetime abstainer
"Current light drinker – At least 12 drinks in the past year but 3 drinks or fewer per week, on average over the past year.", according to the Centers for Disease Control and Prevention (CDC).
Light drinking
"At least 12 drinks in the past year but 3 drinks or fewer per week, on average over the past year.", according to the Centers for Disease Control and Prevention (CDC).
Liquor license
Long-term effects of alcohol
Long-term impact of alcohol on the brain
Low-alcohol beer
Low-alcohol beer is beer with little or no alcohol by volume that aims to reproduce the taste of beer while eliminating or reducing the inebriating effect, carbohydrates, and calories of regular alcoholic brews. Low-alcohol beers can come in different beer styles such as lagers, stouts, and ales. Low-alcohol beer is also known as light beer, non-alcoholic beer, small beer, small ale, or near-beer.

== M ==
Managed alcohol program
Marchiafava–Bignami disease
Medicinal Liquor Prescriptions Act of 1933
Moderate drinking
The CDC defines "Current moderate drinker – More than 3 drinks but no more than 7 drinks per week for women and more than 3 drinks but no more than 14 drinks per week for men, on average over the past year.".
Mood disorder
Moonshine
Moonshine is high-proof liquor, traditionally made or distributed illegally.

== N ==
Neo-prohibitionism
Nicotini
Nightcap
A nightcap is a drink taken shortly before bedtime. For example, a small alcoholic beverage or glass of warm milk can supposedly promote a good night's sleep.
Nip joint
Nitrous oxide
Non-alcoholic drink
Non-alcoholic fatty liver disease

== O ==
Ocsober
Ocsober is an Australian fundraising initiative that encourages people to give up alcohol for the month of October.
Open-container law

== P ==
Pantsdrunk
Passive drinking
Passive drinking, analogous to passive smoking, refers to the adverse consequences experienced by those around someone who is experiencing alcohol intoxication.
Pharmacology of ethanol
Positional alcohol nystagmus
Potomania
Potomania (From Latin pōtō "I drink (liquor)" + mania) is a specific hypo-osmolality syndrome related to massive consumption of beer, which is poor in solutes and electrolytes. With little food or other sources of electrolytes, consumption of large amounts of beer or other dilute alcoholic beverages leads to electrolyte disturbances, where the body does not have enough nutrients known as electrolytes, namely sodium, potassium, and magnesium. The symptoms of potomania are similar to other causes of hyponatremia and include dizziness, muscular weakness, neurological impairment and seizures, all related to hyponatremia and hypokalaemia. While the symptoms of potomania are similar to other causes of hyponatremia and acute water intoxication, it should be considered an independent clinical entity because of its often chronic nature of onset, pathophysiology, and presentation of symptoms.
Pregaming
Pruno
Public intoxication
Public intoxication, also known as "drunk and disorderly" and "drunk in public", is a summary offense in some countries rated to public cases or displays of drunkenness.
Pájaro verde

== Q ==
Quit lit
Quit lit is a literary genre on alcohol cessation, the name can be interpreted as "literature of quiting" or "quit being lit (drunk)".[1] Examples include the Alcoholics Anonymous Big Book, as well as self-help books.

== R ==
Red wine headache
Red wine headache ("RWH") describes a headache, often accompanied by nausea and flushing, that occurs after consuming red wine by susceptible individuals. White wine headaches have been less commonly reported.
Religion and alcohol
Rum Rebellion
Rum ration
Rum-running

== S ==
Sconcing
Sconcing is a tradition at Oxford University of demanding that a person drink a tankard of ale or some other alcoholic beverage as a penalty for some breach of etiquette.
Seeing pink elephants
Self-medication
Shebeen
Short-term effects of alcohol consumption
Shoulder tap
A shoulder tap is an act in which a minor asks an adult to purchase alcohol beverages for the minor. The definition of minor and adult vary by jurisdiction depending on the drinking age, but is usually between ages 18–21. Typically, the minor will walk around a convenience store and solicit help from a passing adult stranger.
Six o'clock swill
Sly-grog shop
Small beer
Small beer (also known as small ale or table beer) is a lager or ale that contains a lower amount of alcohol by volume than most others, usually between 0.5% and 2.8%.
Sober companion
Sober curious
Sober curious is a cultural movement and lifestyle of consuming no or limited alcohol that started in the late 2010s. It differs from traditional abstinence in that it is not founded on asceticism, religious condemnation of alcohol or previous alcohol abuse, but motivated by a curiosity of a sober lifestyle. Markets have reacted by offering a wider selection of non-alcoholic beverages.
Sober living house
Sobering center
Sobrietol
Speakeasy
Spins
Standard drink
Subjective response to alcohol
Surrogate alcohol
Surrogate alcohol is a term for any substance containing ethanol that is intentionally consumed by humans but is not meant for human consumption. Some definitions of the term also extend to illegally produced alcoholic beverages.

== T ==
Teetotalism
Teetotalism is the practice or promotion of total personal abstinence from the consumption of alcohol, specifically in alcoholic drinks. A person who practices (and possibly advocates) teetotalism is called a teetotaler (US) or teetotaller (UK), or is simply said to be teetotal. Globally, almost half of adults do not drink alcohol (excluding those who used to drink but have stopped). A number of temperance organisations have been founded in order to promote teetotalism and provide spaces for non-drinkers to socialise.
Temperance bar
Temperance movement
Town drunk
The town drunk (also called a tavern fool) is a stock character in Anglo-Saxon culture, almost always male, who is drunk more often than exhibiting sobriety.

== V ==
Vodka eyeballing

== W ==
Whiskey Rebellion
Wine and food pairing
Wine fraud
Women in brewing

== Y ==
Yard of ale

== Z ==
Zieve's syndrome

== See also ==
- Glossary of cannabis terms
- Index of alcohol-related articles
