= Index of alcohol-related articles =

Alcohol is any organic compound in which a hydroxyl functional group (-OH) is bound to a carbon atom, usually connected to other carbon or hydrogen atoms. An important class are the simple acyclic alcohols, the general formula for which is C_{n}H_{2n+1}OH. Of those, ethanol (C_{2}H_{5}OH) is the type of alcohol found in alcoholic beverages, and in common speech the word alcohol refers specifically to ethanol. Articles related to alcohol include:

- Under the Volcano
- Alcohol abuse
- Alcohol advertising
- Alcohol and breast cancer
- Alcohol and cancer
- Alcohol and health
- Alcohol and sex
- Alcohol and weight
- Alcohol congener analysis
- Alcohol consumption by youth in the United States
- Alcohol consumption recommendations
- Alcohol dementia
- Alcohol detoxification
- Alcohol education
- Alcohol enema
- Alcohol equivalence
- Alcohol flush reaction
- Alcohol fuel
- Alcohol in the Bible
- Alcohol inhalation
- Alcohol intolerance
- Alcohol intoxication
- Alcohol law
- Alcohol myopia
- Alcohol packaging warning messages
- Alcohol powder
- Alcohol septal ablation
- Alcohol server training
- Alcohol tolerance
- Alcohol use among college students
- Alcohol-related crime
- Alcoholic beverage
- Alcoholic spirits measures
- Alcoholism
- Alcohols (medicine)
- Amyl alcohol
- Anstie's limit
- Aromatic alcohols
- Beer snake
- Beer
- Blackout (alcohol-related amnesia)
- Blood alcohol content
- Christian views on alcohol
- Comparison of psychoactive alcohols in alcoholic drinks
- Denatured alcohol
- Dipsomania
- Distilled beverage
- Drinking culture
- Drinking game
- Driving under the influence
- Drunkenness
- Ethanol
- Ethyl glucuronide
- Ethylphenidate
- Fatty alcohol
- Fluoroalcohol
- Fusel alcohol
- Get Your Sexy Back
- Hangover
- Impact of alcohol on aging
- Islam and alcohol
- Legal drinking age
- Liquor
- List of cocktails
- List of countries by alcohol consumption
- Long-term effects of alcohol
- Methanol
- Patent medicine
- Positional alcohol nystagmus
- Potomania
- Primary alcohol
- Alcohol consumption recommendations
- Roman eating and drinking
- Rubbing alcohol
- Secondary alcohol
- Spins
- Sugar alcohol
- Surrogate alcohol
- Tertiary alcohol
- Wine and health
- Wine

== See also ==
- Glossary of alcohol (drug) terms
