= Night safe =

Night Safe or Nightsafe can refer to:

- A deposit slot on, e.g., the outside of a bank, allowing money etc. to be deposited into the bank's safe outside of bank opening hours, e.g. at night
- A scheme in the UK to reduce alcohol-related crime
- A UK charity for young homeless people in Blackburn.
