= Glossary of alcohol =

Glossary of alcohol is a title that could refer to either:

- Glossary of alcohol (drug) terms, a list of terms related to the psychoactive drug alcohol.
- Bartending terminology, an article detailing terms and phrases used among those who prepare and order alcoholic beverages
