= New Mexico Alcohol and Gaming Division =

The Alcohol and Gaming Division is a division of the New Mexico Regulation and Licensing Department.

== Background ==
The Alcohol and Gaming Division administers New Mexico's licensing provisions, while the Special Investigations Division of the Department of Public Safety enforces the provisions of the New Mexico Liquor Control Act. The Alcohol and Gaming Division also reviews applications for New Mexico Liquor Licenses, supervises the state's Alcohol Server Training program, and adjudicates administrative citations for violation of the Liquor Control Act.
