= Alcohol and health =

Health effects of alcohol may refer to:

- Health effects of alcohol
- Alcohol intoxication
- Short-term effects of alcohol consumption
- Long-term effects of alcohol consumption
- Health effects of wine
