= Sobrietol =

Brand of nutritional supplement

Sobrietol is a North American brand of nutritional supplement marketed as a remedy for hangovers and to prevent symptoms associated with alcohol flush reaction. The list of ingredients includes the enzymes quinoprotein alcohol dehydrogenase (QADH) and quinoprotein aldehyde dehydrogenase (QALDH) from Glucanobacter suboxydans or Acetobacter suboxydans or oxydans, either in purified form or as cell extracts, together with buffering agents and protectants designed to ensure that the enzymes remain biologically active after oral ingestion, and "a source of oxygen in an amount sufficient for the enzymes to metabolize ethanol after administration to a patient."

A 2008 controlled study of breath alcohol levels indicated significantly greater ethanol elimination in subjects given sobrietol vs. placebo. Sobrietol has also been covered by a number of television news programs. Sobrietol has not been evaluated for safety or efficacy by any regulatory agency, such as the U.S. Food and Drug Administration, or the European Medicines Agency.
