= Nip joint =

Illegal liquor selling establishment

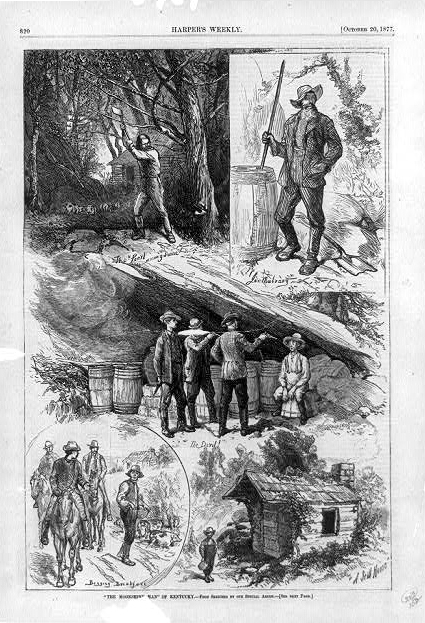
Illustration rom Harper's Weekly, 1877, showing five scenes from the life of a Kentucky moonshiner

A nip joint was an illicit establishment during the Prohibition era where patrons could surreptitiously purchase and consume small servings ("nips") of alcohol. These covert operations provided a discreet venue for those seeking to circumvent the alcohol ban, offering tiny portions to minimize detection risk.

== Etymology ==
The term combines "nip," referring to a small amount of spirits, with "joint," a colloquial expression for a place or establishment, similar to how "beer joint" is used to describe a bar or tavern.

== History ==
Nip joints—found most commonly in Appalachia and similar areas where corn is grown in abundance—are venues where illegal liquor (i.e., moonshine) is sold, often by the drink. Most nip joints are located in residential areas inside homes. The individual in charge is therefore referred to as the "House Man" or "House Lady". Some nip joints have more amenities than others.

== Government tax revenue ==
By not paying the taxes levied on ethanol sold for consumption (and also typically not paying the taxes on their own income from the practice), moonshiners, bootleggers, and nip joint operators are able to make a significant tax-free profit. The enforcement of laws against bootlegging and moonshining is therefore necessary to protect a significant source of government revenue, as well as to provide a fair competitive environment for businesses that comply with the law.

In 2007, the U.S. federal government took in over $5.6 billion in taxes on alcoholic beverages. This government revenue source is protected by the law enforcement activities against those who do not pay the taxes.

As the government of the Commonwealth of Virginia put it, "a nip joint operation deprives the licensed restaurant owner of a legitimate source of income, and deprives the citizens of the Commonwealth and its localities of a legitimate source of tax revenues."

== See also ==
- Black market
- Moonshine
- Sin tax
