= Subjective response to alcohol =

Individual's experience of drinking alcohol

Subjective response to alcohol (SR) refers to an individual's unique experience of the pharmacological effects of alcohol and is a putative risk factor for the development of alcoholism. Subjective effects include both stimulating experiences typically occurring during the beginning of a drinking episode as breath alcohol content (BAC) rises and sedative effects, which are more prevalent later in a drinking episode as BAC wanes. The combined influence of hedonic and aversive subjective experiences over the course of a drinking session are strong predictors of alcohol consumption and drinking consequences. There is also mounting evidence for consideration of SR as an endophenotype with some studies suggesting that it accounts for a significant proportion of genetic risk for the development of alcohol use disorder.

== Theoretical models ==
=== Low Level of Response Model ===
The Low Level of Response Model proposes that individuals who are less sensitive to the effects of alcohol are at greater risk for developing alcohol use disorder. One explanation for this phenomenon is that the experiences of elevated intoxication constitutes a feedback mechanism, which prompts drinking cessation. Low-level responders need to consume more alcohol than high responders to achieve a similar level of intoxication and experience the aversive effects of alcohol; consequently, these individuals must consume more alcohol to trigger the negative feedback loop. Escalating alcohol consumption may ultimately contribute to the development of tolerance, which further dampens sensitivity to alcohol's unpleasant effects. Notably, there is no population-level demarcation separating low from high responders and so level of response is arbitrarily defined (generally in terciles) within a given sample.

Early studies compared SR in individuals (mostly males) with (FH+) and without (FH-) a family history of alcohol dependence in order to demonstrate that individual differences in SR could be considered genetically linked determinants of alcohol use disorder. Non-placebo controlled studies conducted by Schuckit and colleagues found that FH+ males experienced less of the aversive effects of alcohol as compared to FH- males matched on key demographic and body mass variables. Furthermore, FH+ young males and their fathers showed similar SR after reaching peak BAC, suggesting that SR is a heritable risk factor for the development of alcohol use disorder. Schuckit's placebo-controlled studies generally reported lower SR among FH+, as compared to FH-, subjects along declining BAC, with differences more evident among men than women. Additional studies found that FH+ subjects who experienced low-level of response were more than 4 times as likely to meet criteria for alcohol use disorder at 10-year follow-up as compared to FH- subjects who reported the same SR pattern. Subsequent follow-up studies conducted primarily by Schuckit's group established that low-level of response is a genetically linked risk factor for alcohol use disorder, which is not better explained by robust confounding factors such as age of first drink, current alcohol use and impulsivity. A 1992 meta-analysis further buttressed the Low Level of Response Model by reporting that sons of alcoholics exhibited lower responses to alcohol on both the ascending and descending limbs of the BAC curve. Importantly, differences in SR by family history were significant only in the alcohol condition and not the placebo condition, suggesting that SRs observed in the alcohol condition could be attributed to the pharmacological effects of alcohol, rather than to a confounding factor. A 2011 meta-analysis revealed that FH+ individuals reported lower SR in comparison to FH- individuals across both limbs of intoxication, consistent with the Low Level of Response Model. These findings were more robust along the descending limb of the BAC curve where sedative effects of alcohol are more prevalent and among males who comprised the overwhelming majority of participants in early SR studies.

Critics noted that studies supporting the Low Level of Response Model only accounted for the negatively valenced sedative effects of alcohol and that while decreased sensitivity to aversive effects of alcohol would likely lead to increased drinking frequency and severity, the subjective effects of alcohol are, in actuality, quite varied. For example, it is widely accepted that the rewarding properties of alcohol are reinforcing. Yet, according to the Low Level of Response Model, reduced sensitivity to these rewarding effects is an indicator of problematic drinking. To that end, critics have noted that in Schuckit's seminal SR study, FH+ males experienced more "energy" than FH- males along rising BAC, suggesting that heightened sensitivity to the stimulating effects of alcohol may convey risk for developing alcohol problems. Another study found that FH+ subjects reported experiencing less intoxication than FH- subjects in response to a placebo drink, indicating that alcohol expectancies may account for differences in risk more so than SR. That is, individuals at greatest risk for developing alcohol use disorder may expect alcohol to be more enjoyable and less aversive than low-risk individuals.

=== Differentiator Model ===
The Differentiator Model is based on the widely accepted notion that alcohol's effects are biphasic. That is, the stimulating effects of alcohol (i.e., euphoria, sociality, energy) are more prevalent as BAC rises (i.e., ascending limb), while alcohol's sedative effects (i.e., relaxation, nausea, headaches) are experienced most strongly as BAC falls (i.e., descending limb). The Differentiator Model proposes that individuals at greatest risk for developing alcohol use disorder (or those who already meet criteria for alcohol use disorder) are more sensitive to the stimulating effects of alcohol on the ascending limb of intoxication and less sensitive to the sedative effects on the descending limb. Additionally, the combination of heightened rewards and diminished consequences over the course of a drinking episode increases motivation to consume alcohol, leading to longer and more frequent drinking episodes. Repeated engagement in these risky drinking occasions may ultimately contribute to the development of alcohol use disorder.

Support for the Differentiator Model is mixed, perhaps reflecting the paucity of studies designed to test the model itself or record SR over both limbs of intoxication. Both oral and intravenous alcohol administration studies reported that FH+ subjects experienced elevated sensitivity to stimulating effects of alcohol along rising BAC, without the corresponding attenuation of sedative effects as BAC fell. A study using an intravenous alcohol clamping method (participants were titrated to a BAC of .06 g/dl whereupon alcohol was infused to maintain a stable BAC for the duration of the study) reported that FH+ subjects experienced heightened stimulation on the ascending limb of intoxication, consistent with the Differentiator Model. However, FH+ subjects reported decreased stimulation during clamping, indicative of acute tolerance.

Findings by King and colleagues, which are largely corroborated by a recent meta-analysis, suggest that the Differentiator Model best characterizes heavy drinkers at risk for developing alcohol use disorder. Specifically, over the course of several studies, heavy drinkers reported greater positive SR on the ascending limb of intoxication and lower negative SR on the descending limb, in relation to light drinkers. Increased sensitivity to alcohol's stimulating effects along rising BAC and muted sensitivity to alcohol's sedative effects along waning BAC were subsequently predictive of future increases in binge drinking, blackouts, hangovers and alcohol use disorder symptomatology.

== Measurement ==
The Subjective High Assessment Scale (SHAS) captures sensations frequently associated with intoxication such as "clumsy," "dizzy," "drunk" and "high" and was administered extensively in early SR studies. The SHAS is typically administered as a visual analog scale, allowing subjects to rate the extent to which they experienced each symptom during a given experiment. Critics of the measure argue that it primarily captures the sedative effects of alcohol while omitting many of alcohol's stimulating properties. The Biphasic Effects of Alcohol Scale (BAES) assesses 7 stimulating (elated, energized, excited stimulated, talkative, up, vigorous) and 7 sedative (difficulty concentrating, down, heavy head, inactive, sedated, slow thoughts, sluggish) effects of alcohol along an 11-point scale. Studies supporting the Differentiator Model have almost universally used the BAES, rather than the SHAS, as a measure of SR. Critics of the BAES assert that it does not adequately capture positive sedative effects. The Subjective Effects of Alcohol Scale (SEAS) was published in 2013 to address this apparent limitation by referencing positive and negative stimulating and sedative effects; to date, this scale has not been widely used in alcohol challenge studies.

== Genetic moderators ==
Most genetic studies in addiction research focus on the genetic determinants of diagnostic phenotypes such as alcohol use disorder. However, because the causes of alcohol use disorder are so numerous and varied, researchers have turned their attention to endophenotypes, or distinct, genetically linked phenotypes associated with a broad disorder. Endophenotypes are especially useful in addictions research because they are more closely linked to genetic variations than the broad disorder. Therefore, investigators have explored the effects of genetic variation in the endogenous opioid system and the GABAergic system on SR.

Alcohol activates endogenous opioid receptors, potentiating dopamine release which increases the rewarding effects of alcohol. To that end, the A118G single nucleotide polymorphism (SNP) of the mu-opioid receptor gene (OPRM1), has garnered much interest as a potential moderator of SR. Numerous laboratory studies have demonstrated that G-allele carriers experience the stimulating, hedonic effects of alcohol more strongly than A homozygotes. However, a study of non-treatment seeking participants with alcohol dependence found that A homozygotes experienced more stimulation than G carriers, and a study of heavy drinkers reported no differences in SR between OPRM1 genotype. These mixed findings may stem from differences in alcohol use severity among samples, as the allostatic model of addiction contends that individuals shift from reward to relief drinking as alcohol use disorder progresses. Thus, it is possible that social drinkers and individuals with mild alcohol use disorder may experience the hedonic effects of alcohol as most salient while individuals with more severe alcohol use disorder may consume alcohol for its negative reinforcing properties (i.e., to reduce withdrawal symptoms). The use of retrospective, instead of real time, self-reports of SR as well as differences in ethnicities of samples may further contribute to discrepancies in studies exploring the effects of the OPRM1 gene and SR. Taken together, the literature pertaining to the expression of SR by OPRM1 genotype suggests that the A118G SNP of the OPRM1 gene is associated with enhanced sensitivity to the stimulating, but not sedative, effects of alcohol.

Expression of the DAT1 dopamine transporter gene has also been shown to predict severity of alcohol use disorder symptoms with a recent study linking simultaneous carriers of the OPRM1 G-allele and DAT1 A10 allele homozygotes to pleasurable subjective effects along rising BAC.

Alcohol researchers have also evaluated the role of gamma-Aminobutyric acid (GABA) receptors as moderators of SR. Most investigation has focused on genes coding for GABA_{A} receptors, which are involved in dopamine release. Some studies have linked GABRA2 and GABRG1 genes to reductions in the experience of positive and negative subjective effects.

== Clinical implications ==
Because SR is such a strong predictor of future alcohol consumption and problems, medication development has focused on drugs which either reduce the pleasant or increase the unpleasant effects of alcohol.

Naltrexone, an opioid receptor antagonist, is frequently prescribed to patients suffering from alcohol use disorder, with moderate effectiveness. Studies have demonstrated that naltrexone reduces the stimulating and heightens the aversive sedative effects of alcohol in individuals at-risk for alcohol use disorder, contributing to decreases in self-reported subjective high and liking of alcohol. Only one study has reported on the effects of naltrexone on SR in a sample of participants with alcohol dependence: naltrexone, in comparison to a placebo, attenuated subjective stimulation within 10 minutes of administration of a moderate dose of alcohol, but not thereafter.

Laboratory studies have shown that OPRM1 genotype moderates the subjective effects of naltrexone in social and heavy drinkers, such that G carriers reported reduced sensitivity to the stimulating effects of alcohol. Moreover, a placebo-controlled study of heavy drinkers of East Asian descent demonstrated that G carriers experienced greater sensitivity to alcohol's aversive effects as compared to A homozygotes.

There is limited evidence suggesting that quetiapine and varenicline increase the aversive effects of alcohol.
