= Sober curious =

Cultural movement and lifestyle

Share of over-fifteen-year-old population who haven't drunk alcohol in the past year (interactive version); in most countries, it exceeds a third.

Sober curious is a cultural movement and lifestyle of practicing none or limited alcohol consumption that started spreading in the late 2010s, in particular among people from the millennials generation, and was coined by Ruby Warrington in her 2019 book Sober Curious. It differs from traditional abstinence in that it is not founded on asceticism, religious condemnation of alcohol or previous alcohol abuse, but motivated by a curiosity of a sober lifestyle. Markets have reacted by offering a wider selection of non-alcoholic beverages.

== Definition and characteristics ==
[Being sober curious] means, literally, to choose to question, or get curious about, every impulse, invitation, and expectation to drink, versus mindlessly going along with the dominant drinking culture.

— Ruby Warrington

Sober curiosity is often defined as having the option to question or change one's drinking habits, for mental or physical health reasons. It may be practised in many ways, ranging from complete abstinence to thinking more about when and how much one actually wants to drink.

According to Kristine Goddiksen, a Danish opinion columnist on KForum writing on the so-called “sober curious” phenomenon, the fear of being different and being rejected by one's friends is one of the reasons why people drink. If you say no to alcohol, you risk being sober shamed, i.e. labeled as boring, antisocial or restrained, or people may think you are either pregnant, religious or an ex-alcoholic. Goddiksen believes alcohol can be seen as a symbol of the weekend, freedom, and celebration, and the belief may be widespread that alcohol is the only way to loosen up. Goddiksen explains that, in the mindset of certain teetotalers or “sober curious” individuals, if one only feels alive and happy when drinking alcohol, and one's life is centered about when it is the weekend or when one can drink again, that person's life apparently tends to become “paltry” and “artificial”, in the estimation of or according to “sober curious” people.

According to Ida Fabricius Bruun, CEO of the Danish NGO Alkohol & Samfund, parents play an important role in showing their children that socializing is quite possible without drinking alcohol.

== By region ==
Global per capita alcohol consumption has shown a downward trajectory since the 20th century, suggesting a shift towards prioritizing health and well-being.

=== Europe ===
Since the onset of the COVID-19 pandemic, more people in Europe have reduced their alcohol consumption.

Almost 20% of Danes drink more alcohol than the limit recommended by the Danish Health Authority, while year after year, Danish teenagers hold the European record of alcohol intake. Every summer, when first year students start college, Danish media bring stories of how the introductory social activities challenge students, who do not like to be drunk. However, between 2010 and 2023, the sale of non-alcoholic beer in Denmark was six-doubled, while lately the sale of non-alcoholic wine and spirits has also risen. By early 2023, non-alcoholic beverages have a Danish market share of about 4%.

At the 2023 Roskilde Festival, known for its binge drinking among young people, an increased interest among festival guests in staying sober led the organisers to provide a wider selection of non-alcoholic beverages, especially beer, and display messages of 'Drink responsibly' and 'Enjoy the music' on big screens and banners.

=== Asia ===
In Japanese business life, drinking alcohol with colleagues after work is considered standard and difficult to refuse. This has led to some non-drinking colleagues having a disadvantage, in particular regarding promotions. The Japanese sober curious movement experienced increased prominence when in 2020 non-drinking Yoshihide Suga was appointed prime minister.

=== United States ===
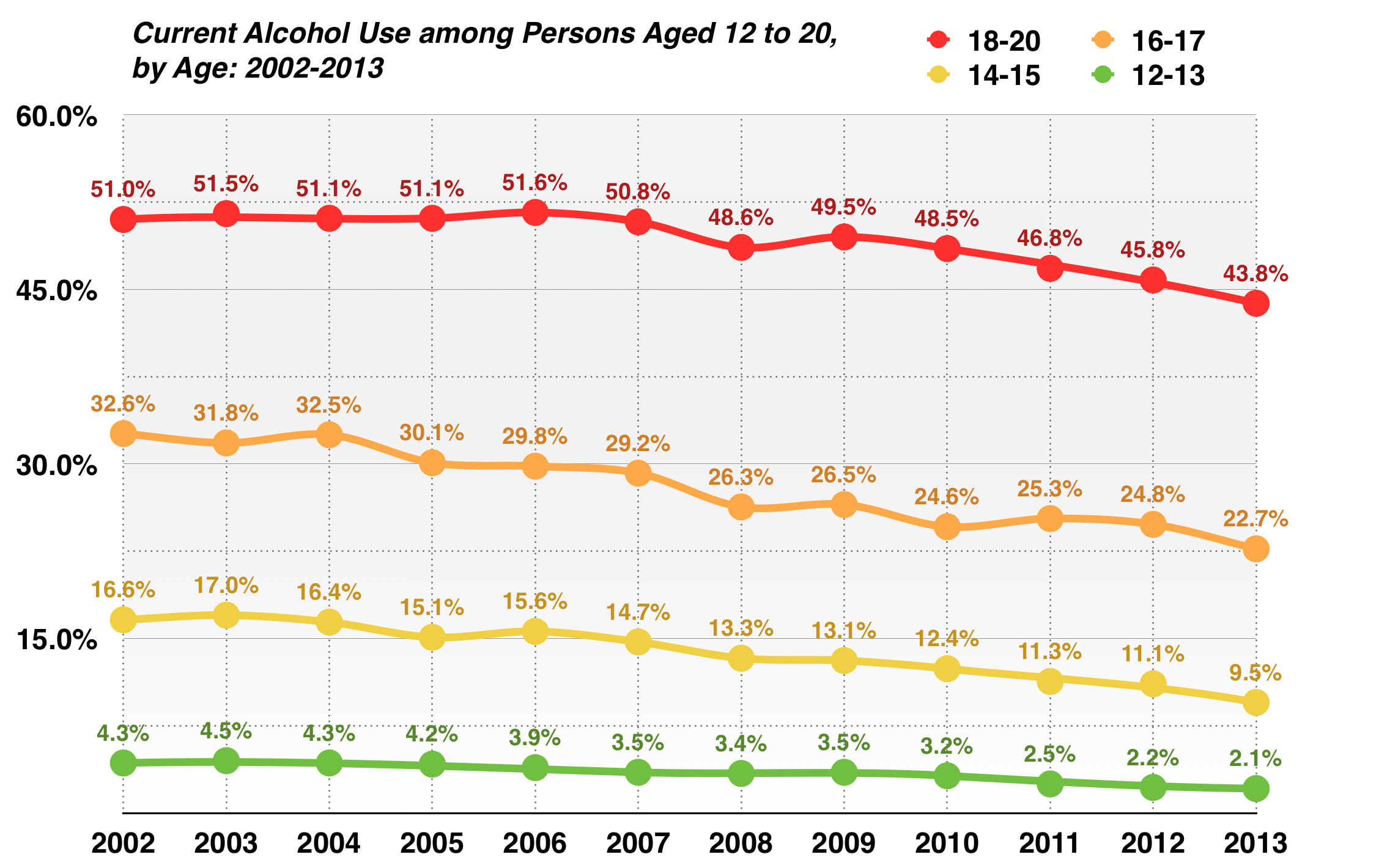
Current Alcohol Use among Persons Aged 12 to 20 in the United States. Source: SAMHSA

In comparison to their parents, more American millennials seem more concerned with maintaining their health, e.g. through physical activity and limited alcohol intake, yet believe that a healthier relationship with alcohol doesn't require them to give up drinking entirely. Moreover, cannabis seems to some degree to replace alcohol: A 2017 study found that in US counties with legalized medicinal cannabis, alcohol sales dropped more than 12% when compared with similar counties without cannabis.

== See also ==
- Health benefits of quitting alcohol
- Brief intervention
- Dry January
- Neo-prohibitionism
- Teetotalism
- Temperance bar

== Literature ==
- Grace, Annie (2015). This Naked Mind: Control Alcohol, Find Freedom, Discover Happiness & Change Your Life. Avery. ISBN 978-0996715003.
- Warrington, Ruby (2019). Sober Curious - The Blissful Sleep, Greater Focus, Limitless Presence, and Deep Connection Awaiting Us All on the Other Side of Alcohol. HarperCollins. ISBN 978-0-06-286903-6.
