= Dry campus =

College where alcohol is banned

"Dry campus" is the term used for the banning of alcohol at colleges and universities, regardless of the owner's age or intention to consume it elsewhere. The policy has received media attention in the United States, although dry campuses and debate regarding the switch from a "wet campus" to a dry one occurs in many other countries. One in three American campuses bans alcohol, and dry campuses are most common in the Midwest and Southern United States.

Many private colleges institute "dry campus" rules as they may be affiliated with churches who would not condone such behavior in any circumstance. In some states, laws exist which prohibit alcohol on all state property, including state college campuses.
