= Alcohol server training =

Occupational education

Alcohol server training is a form of occupational education typically provided to servers, sellers and consumers of alcohol to prevent intoxication, drunk driving and underage drinking. This training is sometimes regulated and mandated by state and local laws, predominantly in North America, and increasingly in other English-speaking countries such as Australia. In some places, such as Australia, gaining such qualifications is required by law, before one can work to sell alcohol.

The training can be used to mitigate liability during a lawsuit involving intoxication by providing evidence of intent on the part of the establishment that serves and sells alcoholic beverages – a "reasonable efforts defense". This training is intended to lower liquor liability insurance premiums, offer compliance with local laws and regulations, reduce penalties for alcohol violations and prevent alcohol-related crimes such as property damage and assault.

This training can be delivered in the classroom by certified trainers or via web-based eLearning programs. Most providers or states offer both options. The training duration can vary from two to six hours, depending on the course content and provider. Many programs include a certification that requires participants to complete an assessment at the end of the training. Additionally, many providers offer specialized programs tailored to different venues where alcohol is served, sold, or consumed, such as grocery stores, liquor stores, convenience stores, restaurants, bars, hotels, nightclubs, stadiums, arenas, amphitheaters, and casinos.

Establishments that train their employees benefit from reduced risk and a safer, more responsible work environment.

Effective training enhances the fundamental people skills of servers, sellers, and consumers of alcohol. It helps individuals understand the difference between people enjoying themselves and those who are getting into trouble with alcohol. Employees and managers who participate in this training can spot underage drinkers and prevent sales to minors, recognize signs of intoxication, effectively intervene to prevent problem situations, and handle refusal situations with greater confidence.

== Australia ==
In Australia, Responsible Service of Alcohol (RSA) training is mandatory nationally for all people selling, offering or serving alcohol, including bar staff, sommeliers, waiting staff and airline staff.

In Queensland, South Australia, Tasmania and Western Australia this training is delivered by registered training organisations as part of the nationally recognised unit of competency Provide responsible service of alcohol (SITHFAB002). In New South Wales and Victoria, state-specific training is delivered.

Its primary purpose is harm minimisation as set out in a by the Federal Government. Under this strategy, each state government is responsible for putting legislation and strategies in place to minimise the harm alcohol causes to various vulnerable groups in society including minors. One of the ways state governments are enabling this national strategy is through mandatory staff training.

The type of training delivery allowed also varies between states, with states such as Queensland, Western Australia and South Australia and Northern Territory, accepting online delivery of the National RSA training, while Victoria does not currently recognise online as a valid delivery channel for this type of training. In July 2012 the New South Wales government introduced a trial of the NSW course online which was subsequently suspended in February 2014 until changes made to the "integrity of online certification". Debate continues as to the benefits of online training versus classroom training, with advocates claiming it delivers benefits such as more consistent and provides better access to rural learners to deliver the training online, while opponents argue that classroom training delivers better learning outcomes.

Regardless of the delivery channel, RSA training is generally founded on the concept of duty of care and requires managers and staff to take all reasonable precautions to protect patrons and staff by preventing patrons from becoming disorderly and/or suffering alcohol intoxication. Other topics covered include blood alcohol content, the effects of alcohol on human health, a standard drink, how to serve responsibly and how to refuse service.

=== New South Wales ===
In New South Wales, the national training unit is accepted if provided by a registered training organisation (RTO) approved by Liquor & Gaming New South Wales. Following this training an RSA competency card issued by Service NSW must also be obtained within ninety days.

The Responsible Supply of Alcohol Training (RSAT) and the L&GNSW RSAT assessments certify a person to provide same-day alcohol deliveries to the general public in NSW. From 1 December 2021, to deliver alcohol the same day in NSW, a person must have a Liquor & Gaming NSW-issued Certificate of RSAT completion.

=== Queensland ===
In Queensland, the national training unit is accepted. The state previously had alternative training requirements, which were replaced by the national standard on 1 July 2013.

=== Victoria ===
In Victoria, the Victorian Commission for Gambling and Liquor Regulation (VCGLR) designs and regulates an independent RSA course. To retain currency, a VCGLR-operated online refresher course must be completed every three years. The VCGLR also operates an online bridging course for people holding interstate RSA qualifications, including the national training unit.

== Canada ==
In Canada, alcohol server training is offered for those who serve alcohol and usually security staff and managers to complete relevant training in all provinces and territories. Training requirements and compliance depends on the provincial and territorial authorities who administer each course. The training in each province and territory differs depending on the liquor laws and has different names : Serving It Right (British Columbia), Proserve Program (Alberta), Serve it Right (Saskatchewan), Smart Choices (Manitoba), Smart Serve Ontario (Ontario), Service in Action (Quebec), It's Good Business: Responsible Service of Alcohol (New Brunswick), It's Good Business (Nova Scotia), It's Our Business (Prince Edward Island), It's Good Business: Responsible Service of Alcohol (Newfoundland and Labrador) and Be a Responsible Server (B.A.R.S) (Yukon)

== New Zealand ==
In New Zealand, the Health Promotion Agency provides optional online training on server obligations under the Sale and Supply of Alcohol Act.

== United States ==
In the United States, this training is taught by a wide range of educational providers. The cost, quality and content of training varies widely from program to program, state to state, and even jurisdiction to jurisdiction. The term "alcohol server training", as a consequence, is often an umbrella attached to the overall intent of the training, if nothing else. This training usually carries some testing and certification, related to local state regulations, but other than the aforementioned few programs are provided nationally.

Currently, there are 30 states and hundreds of local jurisdictions that regulate alcohol server training. Each state and jurisdiction regulate the training in different ways. Some U.S. states, such as California, will mandate training, meaning they approve and require specific training by law. Others will have voluntary training, which means they don't require the training by law but there are specific perks for completing an approved training course. The remainder are considered non-regulated, which means they do not regulate alcohol server training at all.
