= Alcohol-related crime =

Criminal activities that involve alcohol use

Alcohol related crimes of all crimes

Alcohol-related crime refers to criminal activities that involve alcohol use as well as violations of regulations covering the sale or use of alcohol; in other words, activities violating the alcohol laws. Some crimes are uniquely tied to alcohol, such as public intoxication or underage drinking, while others are simply more likely to occur together with alcohol consumption. Underage drinking and drunk driving are the most prevalent alcohol-specific offenses in the United States and a major problem in many, if not most, countries worldwide. Similarly, about one-third of arrests in the United States involve alcohol misuse, and arrests for alcohol-related crimes constitute a high proportion of all arrests made by police in the US and elsewhere else.

In the early 2000s, the monetary cost of alcohol-related crime in the United States alone has been estimated at over $205 billion, twice the economic cost of all other drug-related crimes. In a similar period in the United Kingdom, the cost of crime and its antisocial effects was estimated at £7.3 billion. Another estimate for the UK for yearly cost of alcohol-related crime suggested double that estimate, at between £8 and 13 billion. Risky patterns of drinking are particularly problematic in and around Russia, Mexico and some parts of Africa. Alcohol use is stereotypically associated with crime, more so than other drugs like marijuana. Policing alcohol-related street disorder and enforcing compliance checks of alcohol-dispensing businesses has proven successful in reducing public perception of and fear of criminal activities.

== Manufacturing-related ==
=== Moonshine ===
Alcohol production is licensed and regulated in most countries and territories. Production of liquor outside of these regulations is referred to as producing moonshine or bootleg liquor, and is often illegal.

=== Methanol laced alcohol ===
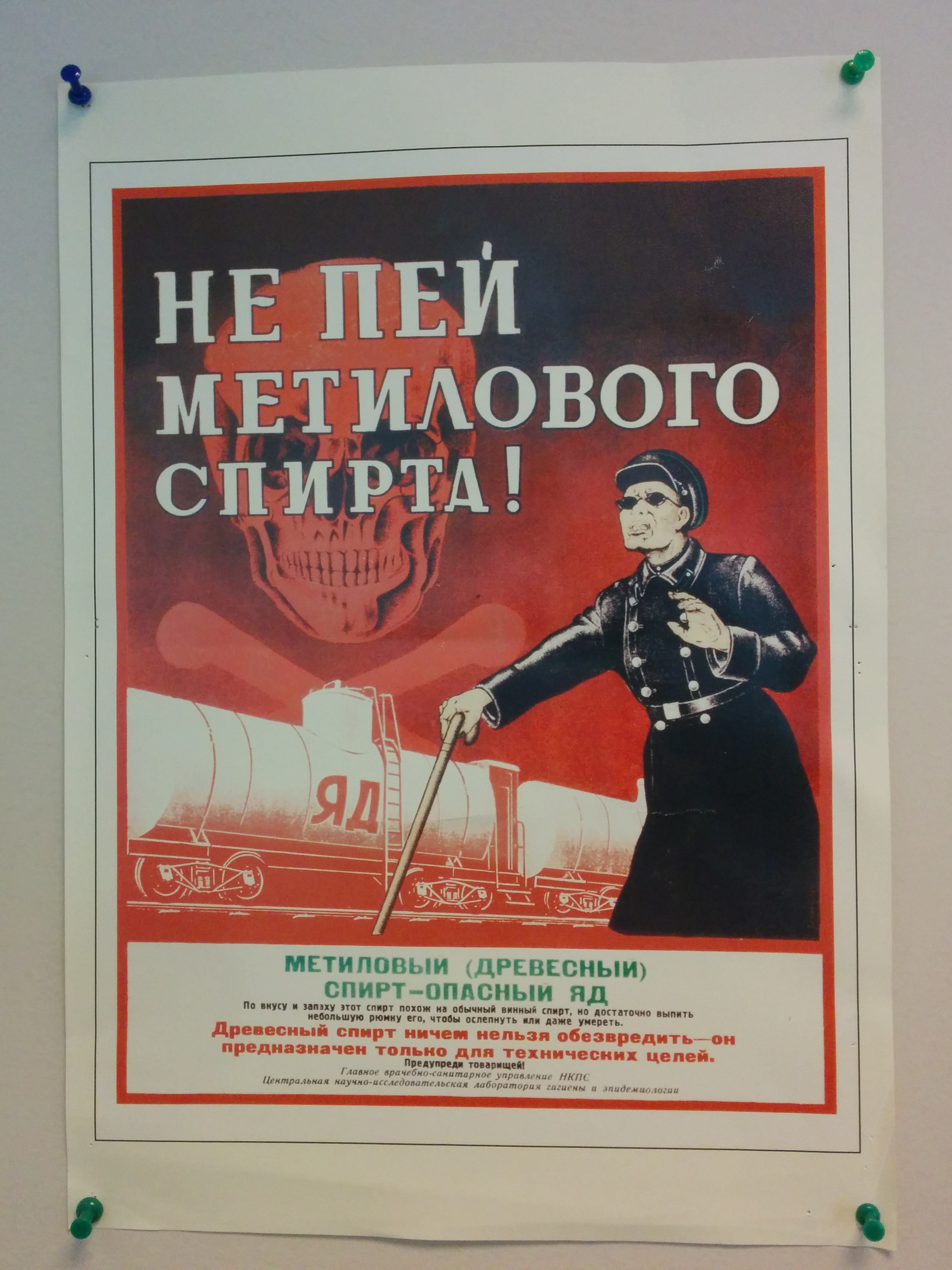
Russian poster warning people about the dangers of drinking methanol.

Outbreaks of methanol poisoning have occurred when methanol is used to adulterate moonshine. Methanol has a high toxicity in humans. If as little as 10 mL of pure methanol is ingested, for example, it can break down into formic acid, which can cause permanent blindness by destruction of the optic nerve, and 30 mL is potentially fatal, although the median lethal dose is typically 100 mL (3.4 fl oz) (i.e. 1–2 mL/kg body weight of pure methanol). The reference dose for methanol is 0.5 mg/kg/day. Toxic effects take hours to start, and effective antidotes can often prevent permanent damage. Because of its similarities in both appearance and odor to ethanol (the alcohol in beverages), it is difficult to differentiate between the two.

=== Pruno ===
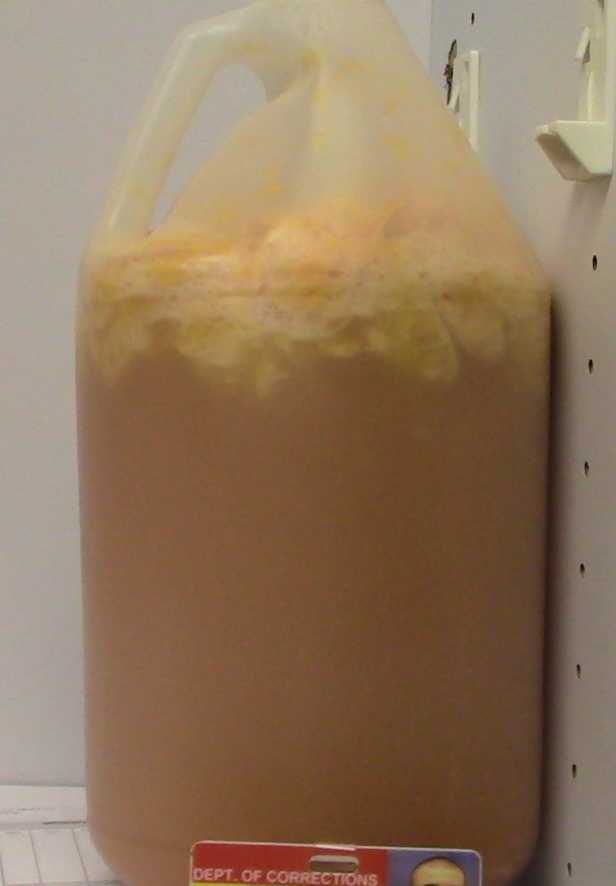
A one-US-gallon (3.8 L) jug of contraband prison wine made from oranges, confiscated from an inmate

Pruno, also known as prison hooch or prison wine, is a term used in the United States to describe an improvised alcoholic beverage. It is variously made from apples, oranges, fruit cocktail, fruit juices, hard candy, sugar, high fructose syrup, and possibly other ingredients, including crumbled bread. Prison officials take a dim view of alcohol and brewing any kind of prison hooch is strictly prohibited. It comes with stiff penalties, from solitary confinement to extended sentences.

=== Wine fraud ===
Wine fraud relates to the commercial aspects of wine. The most prevalent type of fraud is one where wines are adulterated, usually with the addition of cheaper products (e.g. juices) and sometimes with harmful chemicals and sweeteners (compensating for color or flavor).

== Purchase-related ==
=== Rum-running ===
Rum-running is the black market business of smuggling alcoholic beverages where such transportation is forbidden by law.

=== Sly-grog shop ===
In Australia, a sly-grog shop is an unlicensed hotel, liquor-store or other vendor of alcoholic beverages, sometimes with the added suggestion of selling poor-quality products. From the time of the First World War until as late as the 1960s (in Victoria and South Australia), much of Australia had early closing of hotels and pubs serving alcoholic beverages. The term is also used to denote illegal sales in Indigenous areas where alcohol has been banned or restricted.

== Legal drinking age ==
Most countries have prescribed a legal drinking age which prohibits the purchase of alcohol by minors. Most countries also prohibit the consumption of alcohol to minors. Some countries have a tiered structure that limits the sale of stronger alcoholic drinks to older adults (typically based on the percentage of ABV) Other restrictions that some countries impose is based on the place in which alcohol is consumed, such as in the home, in a restaurant, or in a bar. The age at which these restrictions come to an end varies significantly from country to country, as does the degree to which it is enforced, which can also vary within a country.

=== Straw purchase ===
A straw purchase in the context of alcohol law is any purchase wherein a person above the legal age agrees to acquire alcohol for someone who is under the legal drinking age and therefore prohibited from purchasing alcohol themselves. Straw purchases of alcohol are illegal in most jurisdictions. For example, in England and Wales, buying alcohol on behalf of a person under 18 is a summary offence under section 149 of the Licensing Act 2003, punishable by an unlimited fine (level 5 on the standard scale). There is an exception for beer, wine or cider served to a 16 or 17-year-old with a meal at a table.

== Drunk driving ==
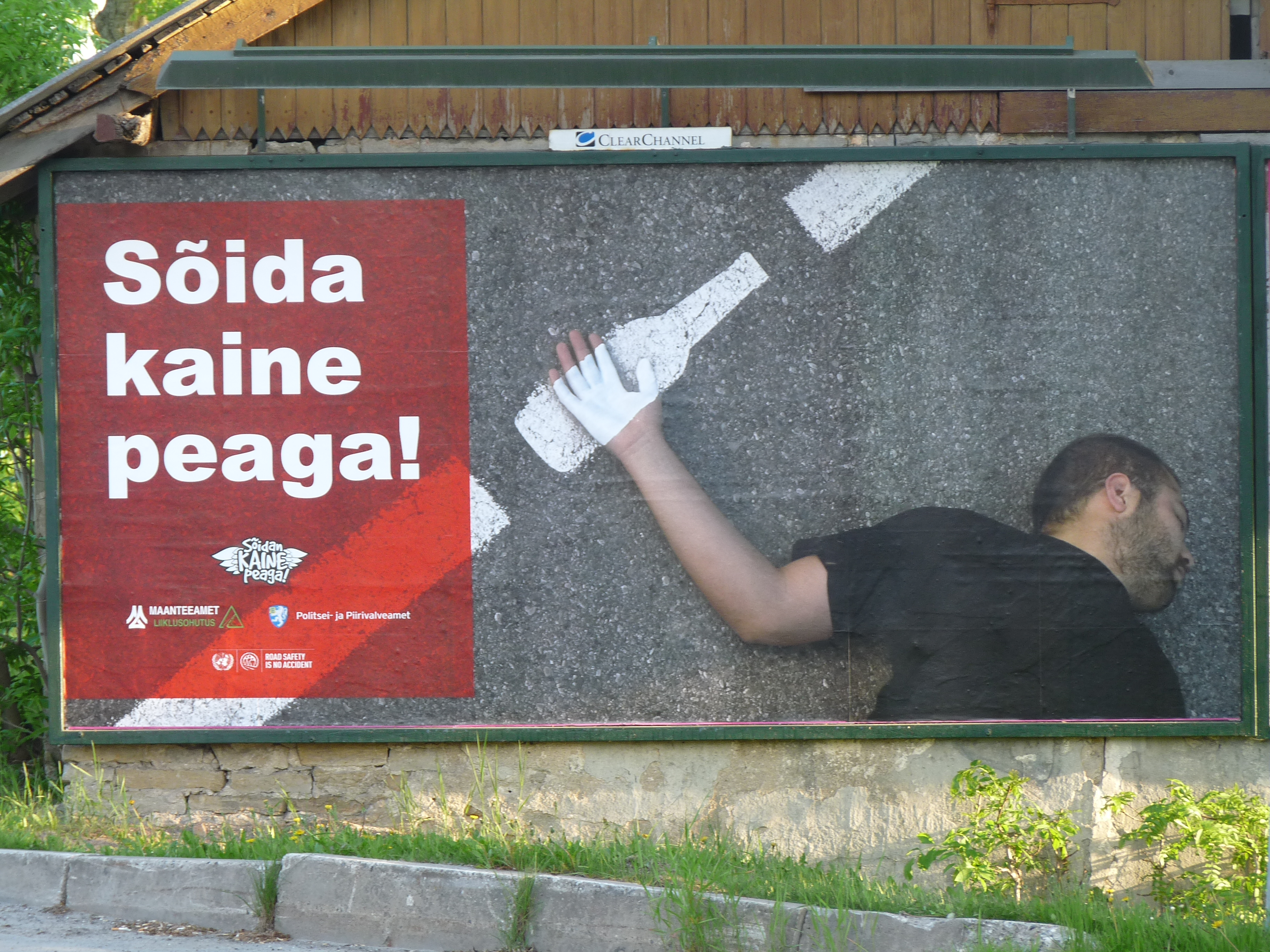
An Estonian billboard warning against drunk driving

Most countries have Driving under the influence laws, specifically for the offense of drunk driving. Driving under the influence (DUI) or driving while intoxicated (DWI), is the crime of driving a motor vehicle while impaired by alcohol or other drugs (including those prescribed by physicians).

With alcohol consumption, a drunk driver's level of intoxication is typically determined by a measurement of blood alcohol content or BAC; but this can also be expressed as a breath test measurement, often referred to as a BrAC. A BAC or BrAC measurement in excess of the specific threshold level, such as 0.08%, defines the criminal offense with no need to prove impairment. In some jurisdictions, there is an aggravated category of the offense at a higher BAC level, such as 0.12%, 0.15% or 0.25%. In many jurisdictions, police officers can conduct field tests of suspects to look for signs of intoxication.

Punishments for violation include fines, temporary or permanent loss of driver's license, and imprisonment. Some jurisdictions have similar prohibitions for drunk sailing, drunk bicycling, and even drunk rollerblading. In many places in the United States, it is also illegal to have an open container of an alcoholic beverage in the passenger compartment of a vehicle.

A 2002 study found 41% of people fatally injured in traffic accidents were in alcohol-related crashes. Misuse of alcohol is associated with more than 40% of deaths that occur in automobile accidents every year. The risk of a fatal car accident increases exponentially with the level of alcohol in the driver's blood.

Drunk cyclists can only be charged if they ride dangerously, cause a crash, or behave disruptively. However, cycling under the influence increases the risk of severe injury, hospital resource use, and even death, according to a study highlighting the importance of safe cycling practices.

== Public intoxication ==
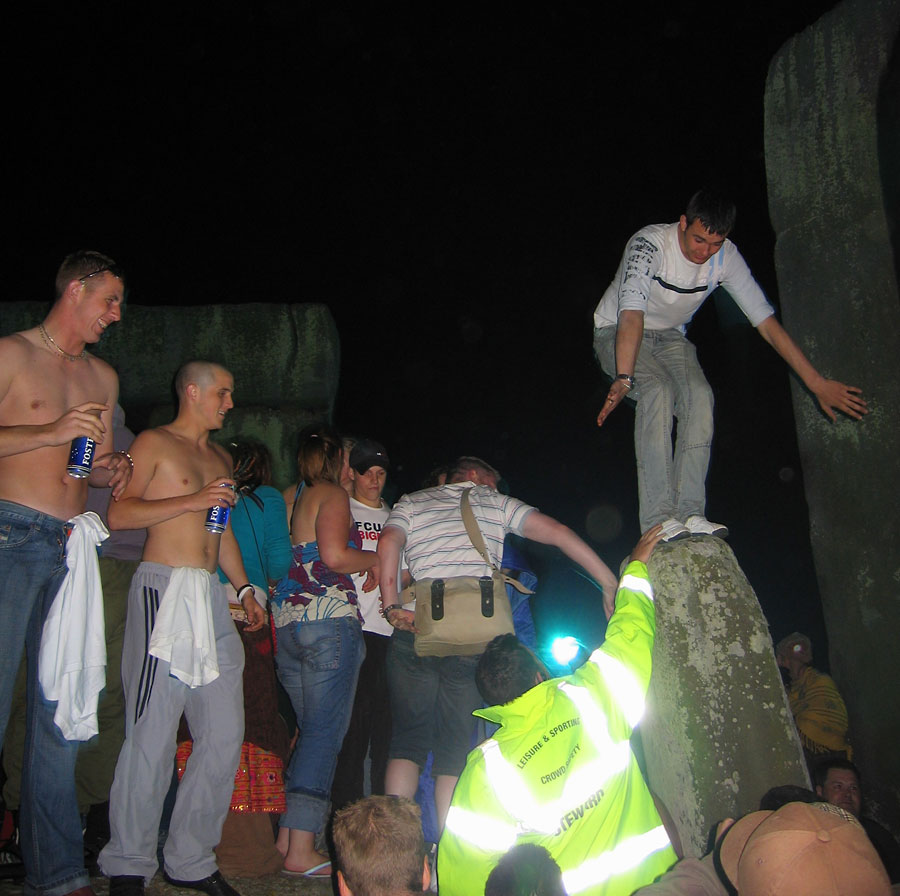
In the United Kingdom, the police normally only enforce the laws against public intoxication if the intoxicated person is unable to act in a reasonable manner, as demonstrated by such activities as climbing on Stonehenge (pictured).

Public drunkenness or intoxication is a common problem in many jurisdictions. Public intoxication laws vary widely by jurisdiction, but include public nuisance laws, open-container laws, and prohibitions on drinking alcohol in public or certain areas. The offenders are often lower class individuals and this crime has a very high recidivism rate, with numerous instances of repeated instances of the arrest, jail, release without treatment cycle. The high number of arrests for public drunkenness often reflects rearrests of the same offenders.

== Involvement in other crimes ==
Alcohol availability and consumption rates and alcohol rates are positively associated with nuisance, loitering, panhandling, and disorderly conduct in open spaces; domestic violence; as well as violent crimes, though specifics differ between particular countries and cultures. Crime perpetrators are much more likely to be intoxicated than crime victims. Research found that factors that increase the likelihood of alcohol-related violence include difficult temperament, hyperactivity, hostile beliefs, history of family violence, poor school performance, delinquent peers, criminogenic beliefs about alcohol's effects, impulsivity, and antisocial personality disorder. The relation between alcohol and violence is not yet fully understood, as its impact on different individual varies. While alcohol use correlates positively with crimes and violence, there is no simple, causal and direct relationship. Studies and theories of alcohol abuse suggest, among others, that use of alcohol likely reduces the offender's perception and awareness of consequences of their actions. The World Health Organization has noted that out of social problems created by the harmful use of alcohol, "crime and violence related to alcohol consumption" are likely the most significant issue.

Heavy drinking is associated with vulnerability to injury, marital discord, and domestic violence. Moderate drinkers are more frequently engaged in intimate violence than are light drinkers and abstainers, however generally it is heavy and/or binge drinkers who are involved in the most chronic and serious forms of aggression. The odds, frequency, and severity of physical attacks are all positively correlated with alcohol use. In turn, violence decreases after behavioral marital alcoholism treatment. Research found that factors that increase the likelihood of alcohol‐related violence include difficult temperament, hyperactivity, hostile beliefs, history of family violence, poor school performance, delinquent peers, criminogenic beliefs about alcohol's effects, impulsivity, and antisocial personality disorder.

Passive drinking, analogous to passive smoking, refers to the adverse consequences experienced by those around someone who is experiencing alcohol intoxication. These include the unborn fetus and children of parents who drink excessively, drunk drivers, accidents, domestic violence and alcohol-related sexual assaults.

=== Domestic violence and child abuse ===
Domestic violence typically co-occurs with alcohol abuse. Alcohol use has been reported as a factor by two-thirds of domestic abuse victims. Moderate drinkers are more frequently engaged in intimate violence than are light drinkers and abstainers, however generally it is heavy and/or binge drinkers who are involved in the most chronic and serious forms of aggression. The odds, frequency, and severity of physical attacks are all positively correlated with alcohol use. In turn, violence decreases after behavioral marital alcoholism treatment. Studies also suggest there may be links between alcohol abuse and child abuse.

=== Football hooliganism ===
Football hooliganism is driven by violence that often is alcohol-fueled. This can be a hard difference to notice as hooligans are regular citizens just like the other fans. Notably, game days can be seen by fans as an opportunity to get drunk, this is supported by a study from Michael Ostrowsky who draws on other research: [f]ans who have been plied with alcohol are more likely than their sober counterparts to engage in a variety of behaviors, some of which can be problematic. Using this information, it is clear that alcohol and sports have a strong connection. However, restricted usage of alcohol as seen in events such as the 2022 Qatar World Cup, was effective in reducing the level of hooliganism that has been previously seen in other major tournaments.

=== Negligence ===
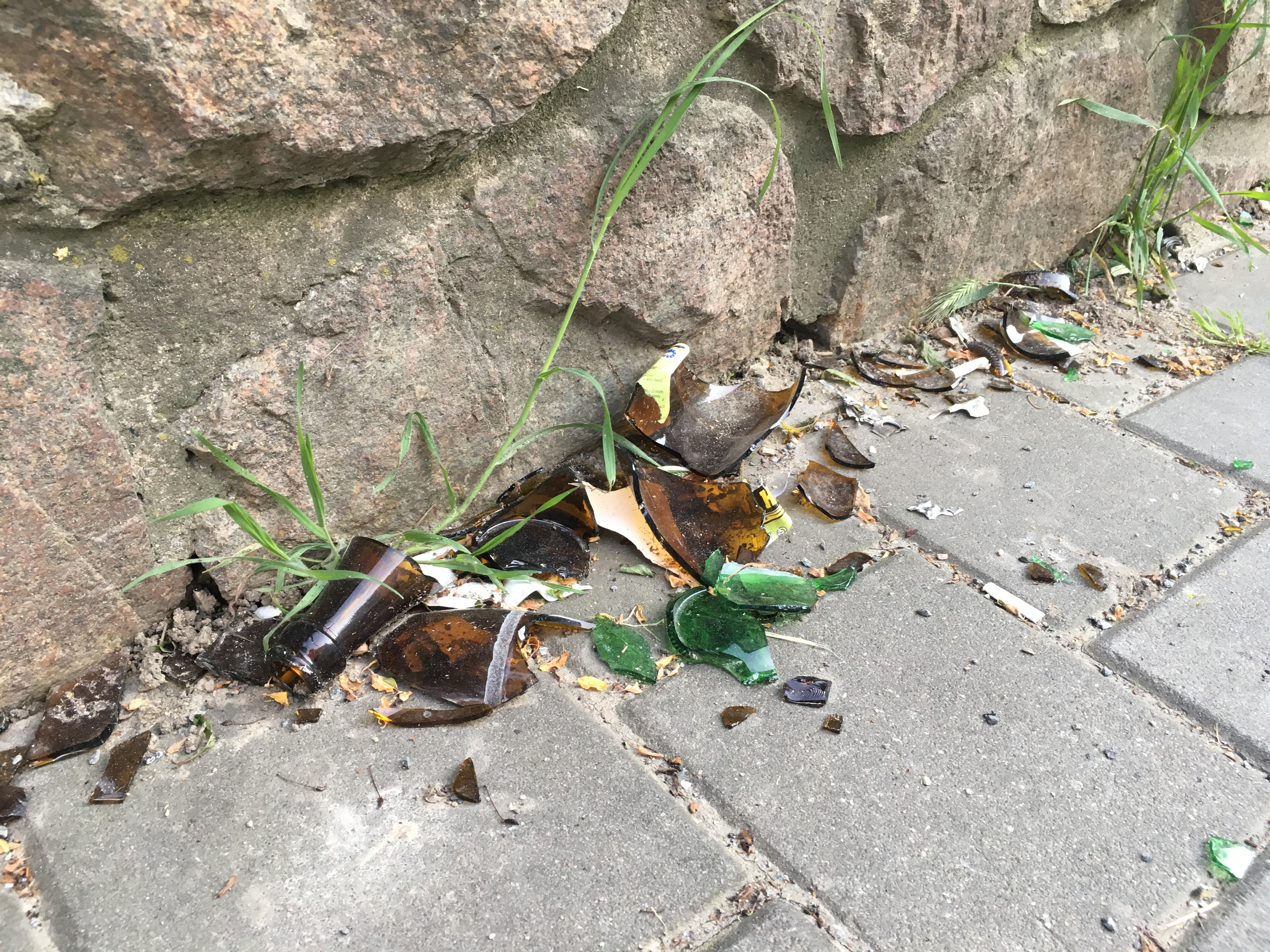
Shards of broken beer bottles

Negligence in alcohol consumption can have a ripple effect on environmentally responsible behavior. For example, improper disposal of alcohol bottles is a common problem. Many are not recycled or left behind in public spaces. Discarded alcoholic beverage containers, especially broken glass shards that are difficult to remove, does not only create an eyesore but may also cause flat tires for cyclists, injure wildlife or kids. Also, people under the influence may forget to extinguish outdoor fireplaces, which may create a fire hazard since unchecked fires can escalate into wildfires. Alcohol consumption can increase urine production and reduce social inhibitions, which may increase the likelihood of urinating in public. In many jurisdictions, public urination may be subject to fines or other penalties depending on local bylaws, the circumstances, and enforcement discretion.

Alcohol consumption can contribute to nighttime noise pollution, especially through loud music played by intoxicated individuals. This disrupts sleep and relaxation for nearby residents, impacting health and productivity. Municipal noise ordinances often establish quiet hours and penalties for violations.

=== Robbery and violent crimes ===
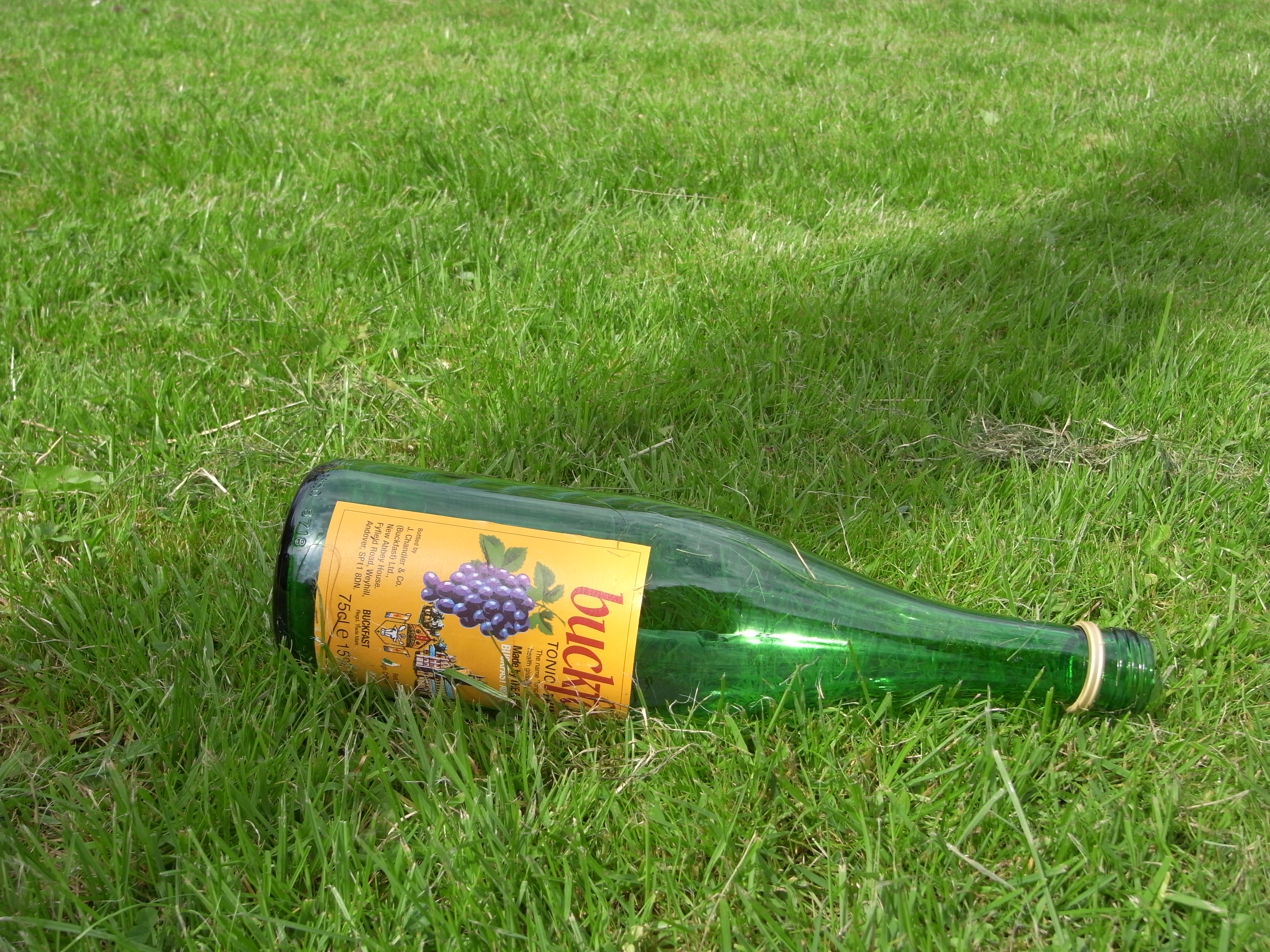
In certain parts of Scotland, the caffeinated alcoholic drink Buckfast Tonic Wine (originally made by monks at Buckfast Abbey) is associated with drinkers who are prone to committing anti-social behaviour when drunk.

Robbery and violent crimes often involve alcohol use, and there is a positive correlation between such crimes and alcohol use. 15% of robberies, 63% of intimate partner violence incidents, 37% of sexual assaults, 45–46% of physical assaults and 40–45% of homicides in the United States involved use of alcohol. A 1983 study for the United States found that 54% of violent crime perpetrators, arrested in that country, had been consuming alcohol before their offenses. In the United Kingdom, in 2015/2016, 39% of those involved in violent crimes were under alcohol influence. A significant portion, 40%, of homicide victims tested positive for alcohol in the US. International studies are similar, with an estimate that 63% of violent crimes worldwide involves the use of alcohol. In 2002, it was estimated that 1 million violent crimes in the U.S. were related to alcohol use. More than 43% of violent encounters with police involve alcohol.

=== Glassing ===
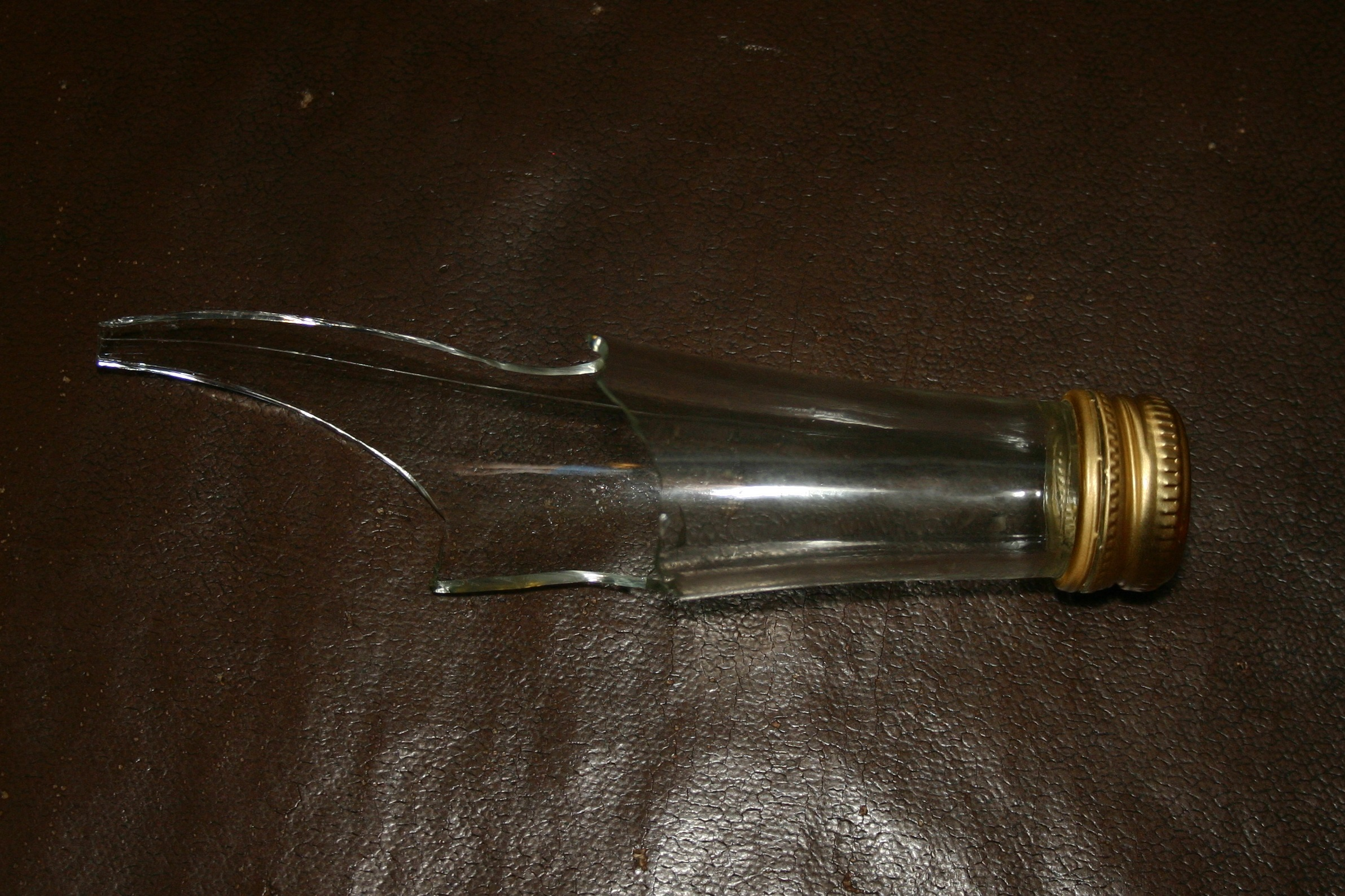
A broken bottle for glassing.

Glassing (or bottling in New Zealand) is a physical attack using a glass or bottle as a weapon. Glassings can occur at bars or pubs where alcoholic beverages is served and such items are readily available. The most common method of glassing involves the attacker smashing an intact glass vessel in the face of the victim, though it can also be smashed onto a surface, then gripped by the remaining base of the glass or neck of the bottle with the broken shards protruding outwards and used in a manner similar to a knife.

=== Alcohol-facilitated sexual assault ===
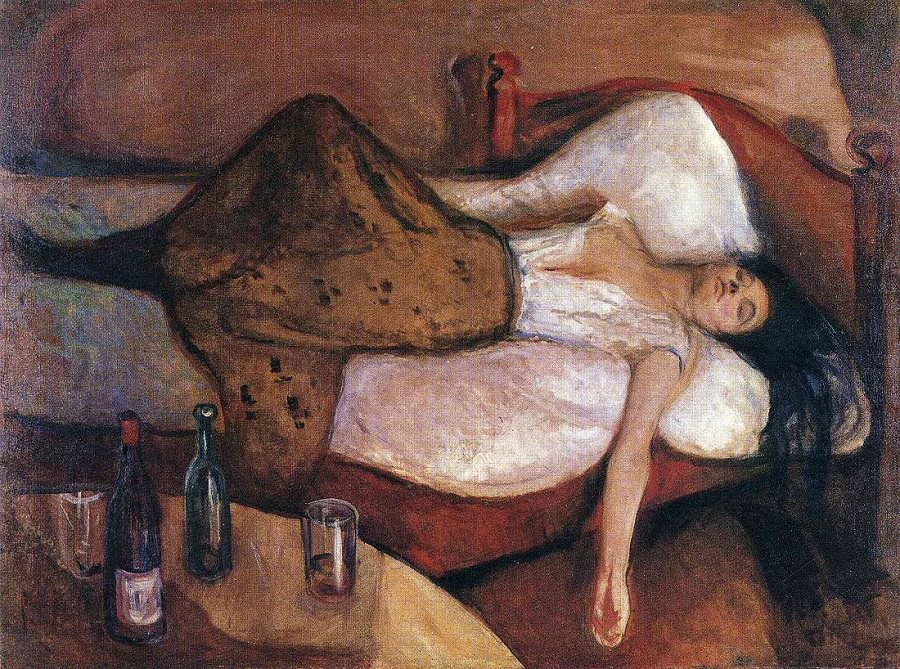
Most sexual assaults occur when the victim has consumed alcohol, rather than "spiked" drinks.

Rape is any sexual activity that occurs without the freely given consent of one of the parties involved. This includes alcohol-facilitated sexual assault which is considered rape in most if not all jurisdictions, or non-consensual condom removal which is criminalized in some countries (see the map below). A 2008 study found that rapists typically consumed relatively high amounts of alcohol and infrequently used condoms during assaults, which was linked to a significant increase in STI transmission. This also increase the risk of pregnancy from rape for female victims. Some people turn to drugs or alcohol to cope with emotional trauma after a rape; use of these during pregnancy can harm the fetus.

One of the most common date rape drugs is alcohol, administered either surreptitiously or consumed voluntarily, rendering the victim unable to make informed decisions or give consent. The perpetrator then facilitates sexual assault or rape, a crime known as alcohol- or drug-facilitated sexual assault (DFSA). However, sex with an unconscious victim is considered rape in most if not all jurisdictions, and some assailants have committed "rapes of convenience" whereby they have assaulted a victim after he or she had become unconscious from drinking too much. The risk of individuals either experiencing or perpetrating sexual violence and risky sexual behavior increases with alcohol abuse, particularly by the consumption of caffeinated alcoholic drinks.

==== Non-consensual condom removal ====
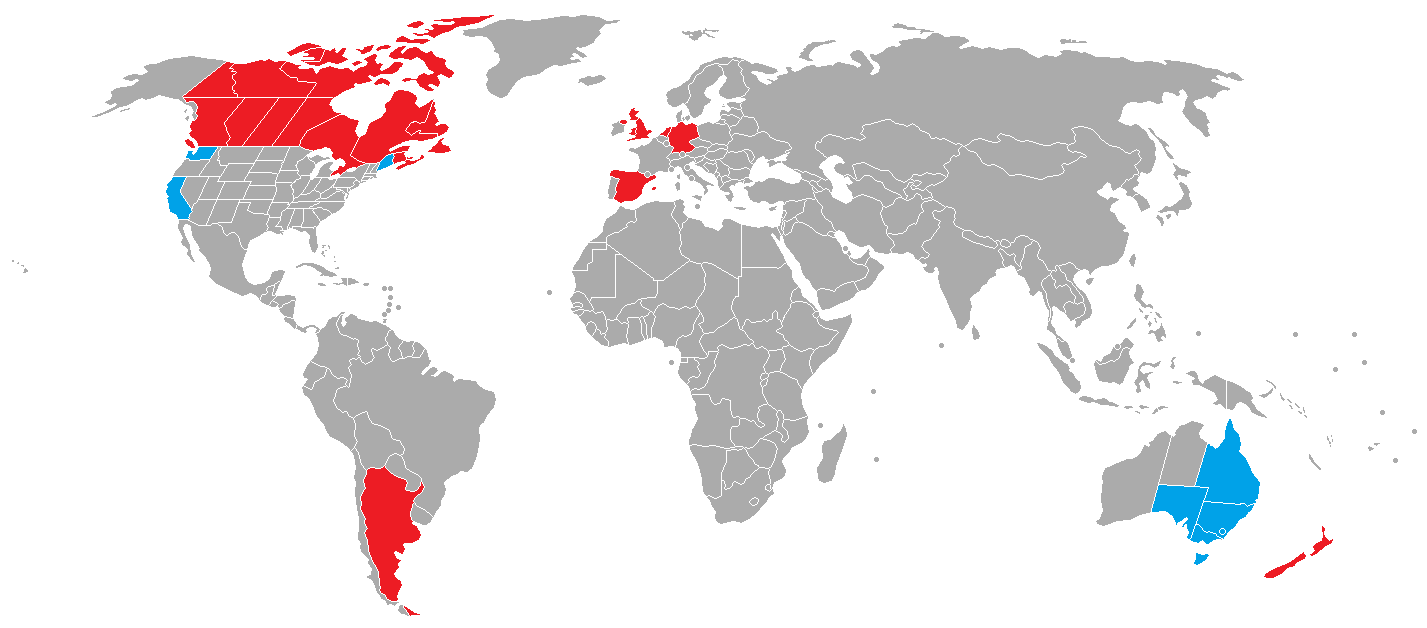
Court decision declaring stealthing as rape or sexual assault Law prohibiting stealthing

Non-consensual condom removal, or "stealthing", is the practice of a person removing a condom during sexual intercourse without consent, when their sex partner has only consented to condom-protected sex. Purposefully damaging a condom before or during intercourse may also be referred to as stealthing, regardless of who damaged the condom.

Consuming alcohol can be risky in sexual situations. It can impair judgment and make it difficult for both people to give or receive informed sexual consent. However, a history of sexual aggression and alcohol intoxication are factors associated with an increased risk of men employing non-consensual condom removal and engaging in sexually aggressive behavior with female partners.

==== Wartime sexual violence ====
The use of alcohol is a documented factor in wartime sexual violence. For example, rape during the liberation of Serbia was committed by Soviet Red Army soldiers against women during their advance to Berlin in late 1944 and early 1945 during World War II. Serbian journalist Vuk Perišić said about the rapes: "The rapes were extremely brutal, under the influence of alcohol and usually by a group of soldiers. The Soviet soldiers did not pay attention to the fact that Serbia was their ally, and there is no doubt that the Soviet high command tacitly approved the rape."

While there was not a codified international law specifically prohibiting rape during World War II, customary international law principles already existed that condemned violence against civilians. These principles formed the basis for the development of more explicit laws after the war, including the Nuremberg Principles established in 1950.

=== Street crime ===
Research suggests a link between alcohol use and involvement in street crime. Intoxication can impair judgment and lower inhibitions, increasing the likelihood of risky behavior like theft or violence. This can escalate situations and lead to more serious crimes. Since the consumption of alcohol negatively impacts the brain function, drunk people fail to assess the situation which often results in overreacting and unpredictable fights. Street fighting is usually illegal due to its disruption of public order. Some fights are driven by alcohol. Alcohol itself does not directly lead to violence but it acts as a catalyst, allowing cheers from the crowds or provocation from opponents to ignite the fight between fighters.

=== Vandalism ===
Alcohol-fueled vandalism is a form of destructive behavior that occurs when individuals under the influence of alcohol damage or destroy property, often public or private, that doesn't belong to them. This vandalism can range from minor acts like spray-painting graffiti or breaking windows to more serious offenses like damaging vehicles or buildings.

Impaired judgment and impulse control are key factors. Alcohol intoxication weakens a person's ability to make sound decisions and control their urges, making them more likely to engage in risky or destructive behavior. Additionally, the disinhibition caused by alcohol can lead to a sense of anonymity or invincibility, further emboldening individuals to commit vandalism. Social settings where heavy alcohol consumption is present, particularly those with large groups, can create a sense of conformity or peer pressure, increasing the likelihood of vandalism.

The consequences of alcohol-fueled vandalism can be significant for both the victims and the perpetrators. Victims may face financial losses to repair or replace damaged property. Beyond the financial impact, vandalism can also create a sense of fear and insecurity within communities. For the perpetrators, vandalism can lead to criminal charges, fines, or even jail time.

=== Currency ===
Alcohol has been used as a currency for transactional sex in South Africa, and Uganda.

== History ==
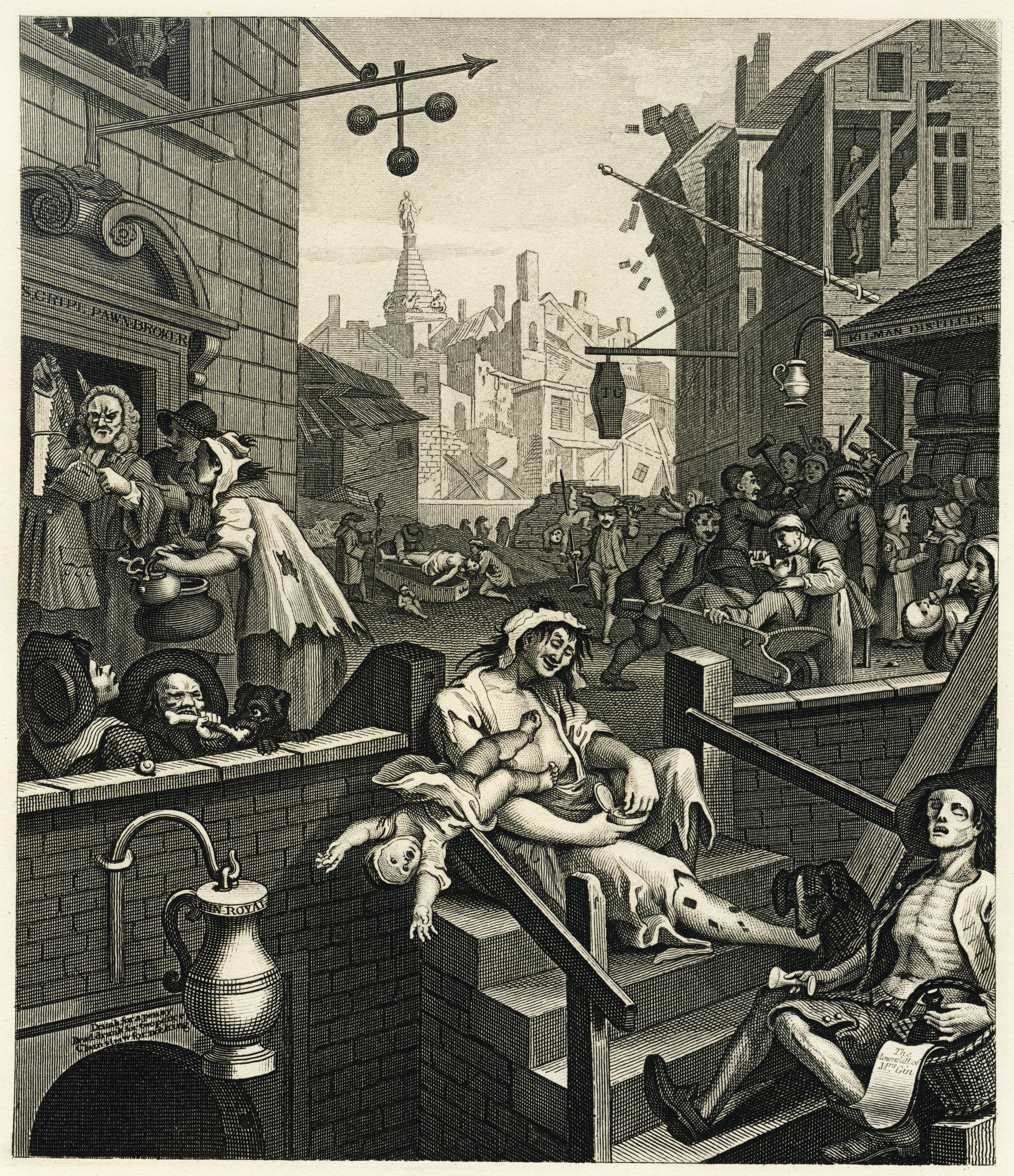
Gin Lane by William Hogarth, 1751

The Gin Craze was a period in the first half of the 18th century when the consumption of gin increased rapidly in Great Britain, especially in London. By 1743, England was drinking 2.2 gallons (10 litres) of gin per person per year. The Sale of Spirits Act 1750 (commonly known as the Gin Act 1751) was an Act of the Parliament of Great Britain (24 Geo. 2. c. 40) which was enacted to reduce the consumption of gin and other distilled spirits, a popular pastime that was regarded as one of the primary causes of crime in London.

Gilbert Paul Jordan (aka The Boozing Barber) was a Canadian serial killer who is believed to have committed the so-called "alcohol murders" between 1965-c. 2004 in Vancouver, British Columbia.

== See also ==
- Alcohol myopia
- Drug-related crime
- List of countries by alcohol consumption per capita
- Prohibition of alcohol
