= Standard drink =

Measure of the pure ethanol in an alcoholic beverage

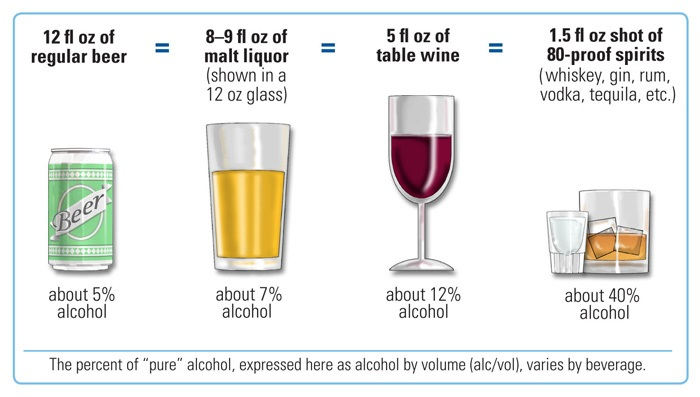
United States standard drinks of beer, malt liquor, wine, and spirits compared. Each contains about 14 grams or 17.7 ml of ethanol. Standard drinks vary widely country by country and often don't represent real world pours.

A standard drink or (in the UK) unit of alcohol is a theoretical measure of alcohol consumption representing a fixed amount of pure alcohol. The notion is used in relation to recommendations about alcohol consumption and its relative risks to health. In theory it helps to inform alcohol users, but in practice standard drink definitions vary widely country by country and typically contain less alcohol than real world drinks.

A hypothetical alcoholic beverage sized to one standard drink varies in volume depending on the alcohol concentration of the beverage (for example, a standard drink of spirits takes up much less space than a standard drink of beer), but in theory it always contains the same amount of alcohol and therefore produces the same amount of intoxication. In reality, research shows that drinkers usually over-pour for drinks like wine and liquor, so real world alcohol intake with those drinks is usually underestimated. Many government health guidelines specify low to high risk amounts in units of grams of pure alcohol per day, week, or single occasion. These government guidelines often illustrate these amounts as standard drinks of various beverages, with their serving sizes indicated. Although used for the same purpose, the definition of a standard drink varies very widely from country to country. Because of the variations across borders and the lack of real world understanding and application, the usefulness of the standard drink has been called into question.

Labeling beverages with the equivalent number of standard drinks is common in some countries.

== Definitions in various countries ==
The definition of what constitutes a standard drink varies very widely between countries, with what each country defines as the amount of pure alcohol in a standard drink ranging from 8 to 20 grams (10 to 25 ml).

The sample questionnaire form for the World Health Organization's Alcohol Use Disorders Identification Test (AUDIT) uses 10 g (0.35 oz), and this definition has been adopted by more countries than any other amount. Some countries choose to base the definition on mass of alcohol (in grams) while others base the unit on the volume (in ml or other volume units). For comparison, both measurements are shown here, as well as the number of standard drinks contained in 500 millilitres (16.9 US fluid ounces) of 5% ABV beer (a typical large size of beer in Europe, slightly larger than a US pint of 473 mL). The terminology for the unit also varies, as shown in the Notes column.

Amount of pure alcohol (in grams or millilitres) contained in a standard drink, as defined in different countries.
Country	Mass (g)	Volume (mL)	Ratio to WHO AUDIT's example (10 g)	Is 10 g	Notes
Albania	10	12.7	1	Yes	
Argentina	14	17.7	1.4	No	
Australia	10	12.7	1	Yes	
Austria	20	25.3	2	No	
Benin	14	17.7	1.4	No	
Bosnia and Herzegovina	10	12.7	1	Yes	
Canada	13.6 or 13.45 or 13.5	17.2 or 17	1.36 or 1.35	No	This specific unit is computed based on the oz definition as: 12 imp fl oz (341 ml) bottle of 5% alcohol beer, cider or cooler; 1.5 imp fl oz (43 ml) shot of 40% hard liquor (vodka, rum, whisky, gin etc.); 5 imp fl oz (142 ml) glass of 12% wine.
Costa Rica	8	10	0.8	No	
Croatia	10	12.7	1	Yes	
Denmark	12	15.2	1.2	No	
Estonia	10	12.7	1	Yes	
Fiji	10	12.7	1	Yes	
Finland	12	15.2	1.2	No	
France	10	12.7	1	Yes	
Georgia	10	12.7	1	Yes	
Germany	11	13.8	1.1	No	Standardglas defined as containing 10–12 g (central value used here)
Guyana	8	10	0.8	No	
Hong Kong	10	12.7	1	Yes	
Hungary	17	21.5	1.7	No	
Iceland	8	10	0.8	No	áfengiseining defined as 8 g but treated as equivalent to 10 mL
Ireland	10	12.7	1	Yes	
Italy	12	15.2	1.2	No	unità standard defined as 12 g
Japan	19.75	25	1.98	No	"unit (tan'i)". MHLW's conventional unit, based on 1 gō (unit) (approx. 180 mL) of sake.
Japan	10	12.7	1	Yes	"drink (dorinku)". Introduced by 2010 to align with the WHO AUDIT, and to avoid the conventional "unit (tan'i)" (20 g) which gave a false impression of "minimum amount to drink". Sometimes this amount (around 10 g) is also called "unit (tan'i)", a term which traditionally meant 20 g.
Latvia	12	15.2	1.2	No	
Luxembourg	10–12	12.7–15.2	1-1.2	No	
Malta	8	10	0.8	No	
Mexico	10–13	12.7–16.5	1-1.3	No	
Namibia	10	12.7	1	Yes	
Netherlands	10	12.7	1	Yes	
New Zealand	10	12.7	1	Yes	
North Macedonia	14.2	18	1.42	No	
Norway	12.8	15	1.28	No	
Philippines	12	15.2	1.2	No	
Poland	10	12.7	1	Yes	
Portugal	11	13.8	1.1	No	10–12 g (central value used here)
Russia	10	12.7	1	Yes	
Saint Vincent and the Grenadines	14	17.7	1.4	No	
Seychelles	8	10	0.8	No	
Singapore	10	12.7	1	Yes	
Slovenia	10	12.7	1	Yes	
South Korea	8	10	0.8	No	
Spain	10	12.7	1	Yes	
Sweden	12	15.2	1.2	No	standardglas corresponds to 33 cl 5% beer, 13 cl wine, or a drink or shot based on 4 cl 40% liquor
Switzerland	12	15.2	1.2	No	
Taiwan (ROC)	10	12.7	1	Yes	
Thailand	10	12.7	1	Yes	
Ukraine	10	12.7	1	Yes	
United Kingdom	8	10	0.8	No	unit of alcohol (Note: The term "standard drink" was used in the United Kingdom in the first guidelines (1984) that published "safe limits" for drinking, but this was replaced by reference to units of alcohol in the 1987 guidelines and that term has been used in all subsequent UK guidance.) defined as 10 mL but treated as equivalent to 8 g.
United States	14	17.7	1.4	No	standard drink defined as .6 US fl oz (18 ml) pure ethanol, approximately 14 g
Uruguay	10	12.7	1	Yes	

== Calculation of pure alcohol by mass ==
It is possible to calculate the pure alcohol mass in a serving from the concentration, density of alcohol, and volume:
$$\text{volume} \times \text{alcohol by volume} \times \text{density of alcohol} = \text{Pure alcohol mass}$$

For example, a 355 ml (12.0 US fl oz) glass of beer with an ABV of 5.5% contains 19.525 ml of pure alcohol, which has a density of 0.78945 g/mL (at 20 °C), and therefore a mass of 15.41 grams (0.544 oz).
$$355\,\mathrm{mL} \times 0.055 \times 0.78945\,\mathrm{g}/\mathrm{mL} \approx 15.41\,\mathrm{g}$$
or
$$0.355\,\mathrm{L} \times 0.055 \times 789.45\,\mathrm{g}/\mathrm{L} \approx 15.41\,\mathrm{g}$$

When the drink size is in fluid ounces (which differ between the UK and the US), the following conversions can be used:

Country	Volume of fl. oz. (mL)	Mass of fl. oz. of alcohol (g)
UK	28.41	22.43
US	29.57	23.35

One should bear in mind that a pint in the UK is 20 imperial fluid ounces, whereas a pint in the US is 16 US fluid ounces, and that 1 imperial fl. oz. ≈ 0.96076 US fl. oz.: this means that 1 imperial pint ≈ 1.20095 US pints.

== Calculation of units of alcohol by volume ==
Calculating alcoholic content in countries that use units of alcohol is straightforward, as the volume multiplied by the Alcohol by volume (ABV) gives the alcohol content. In the UK, one unit of alcohol equals one percentage point per litre, of any alcoholic beverage.

$$\text{volume (in litres)} \times \text{alcohol by volume (ABV)} = \text{alcohol content (units of alcohol)}$$

The standard UK units of alcohol in a drink can be determined by multiplying the volume of the drink (expressed in litres) by its percentage ABV. For example, a standard 750 millilitres (25 US fl oz) bottle of wine at 12% ABV contains:

$$\begin{align}
0.75\mbox{ L} \times 12\% &= 9\mbox{ units}
\end{align}$$

One UK standard measure of spirits (25ml, 0.025 L) at 40% ABV contains:

$$\begin{align}
0.025\mbox{ L} \times 40\%  &= 1\mbox{ unit}
\end{align}$$

One imperial pint (568ml, 0.568 L) of beer at 4% ABV contains:

$$\begin{align}
0.568\mbox{ L} \times 4\%  &= 2.27\mbox{ units}
\end{align}$$

In the UK, both volume and ABV are usually given on bottles, drinks menus and so on, and so are easy to retrieve.

== Reference standard drinks ==
A standard drink is often different from a normal serving in the country in which it is served. For example, in the United States, a standard drink is defined as 0.6 US fluid ounces (18 ml) of ethanol per serving, which is about 14 grams of alcohol. This corresponds to a 12-US-fluid-ounce (350 ml) can of 5% beer, a 5-US-fluid-ounce (150 ml) glass of 12% ABV (alcohol by volume) wine, or a 1.5-US-fluid-ounce (44 ml) so-called "shot" of spirit, assuming that beer is 5% ABV, wine is 12% ABV, and spirits is 40% ABV (80 proof). Most wine today is higher than 12% ABV (the average ABV in Napa Valley in 1971 was 12.5%), hence will be more than a standard drink. Similarly, although 40% ABV is standard for spirits, the amount of spirit in a mixed drink varies widely, and research shows that people vastly overpour liquor when serving themselves.

=== Beers ===
- Because beer comes in bottles, cans, or in set measurements poured on draught, it typically is easier to calculate and keep track of the amount of alcohol consumed compared to free poured drinks like liquor and wine.
- Half an imperial pint 280 ml of beer with 3.5% ABV contains almost exactly one UK unit; however, most beers are stronger. In pubs in the United Kingdom, beers generally range from 3.5 to 5.5% ABV, and continental lagers start at around 4% ABV. An imperial pint 568 ml of such lager (at 5.2% ABV) contains almost 3 units of alcohol rather than the oft-quoted 2 units.
- A half-litre (500 ml) of standard lager or ale (5%) contains 2.5 UK units.
- One litre (1000 ml) of typical Oktoberfest beer (5.5–6%) contains 5.5–6 UK units of alcohol.
- A beer bottle is typically between 333 and 355 ml (11.3 and 12.0 US fl oz), approximately 1.7 UK units at 5%.
- 375 ml (12.7 US fl oz) can of light beer (2.7% alcohol) = 0.8 Australian standard drinks
- 375 ml (12.7 US fl oz) can of mid-strength beer (3.5% alcohol) = 1 Australian standard drink
- 375 ml (12.7 US fl oz) can of full strength beer (4.8% alcohol) = 1.4 Australian standard drinks
- 12 US fl oz (350 ml) of 5% ABV beer = 1 US standard drink

=== Wines ===
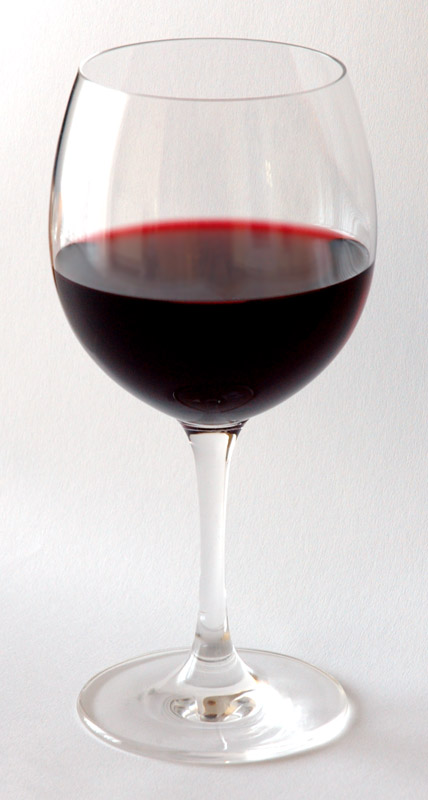
A large (250 ml) glass of 12% ABV red wine has about three UK units of alcohol. A medium (175 ml) glass has about two UK units.

- A "medium" glass (175 ml (5.9 US fl oz) of 12% ABV wine contains around 2.1 units of alcohol. However, British pubs and restaurants often supply larger quantities (large glass ≈ 250 ml (8.5 US fl oz)), which contain 3 units. Red wines often have a higher alcohol content (on average 12.5%, sometimes up to 16%). Even though the sizes of wine glasses are defined in UK law, the terms large, medium, standard, etc. are not defined in law.
- A 750 ml (25 US fl oz) bottle of 12% ABV wine contains 9 units; 16% ABV wine contains 12 units; a fortified wine such as port at 20% ABV contains 15 units.
- 100 ml (3.4 US fl oz) glass of wine (13.5% alcohol) = 1 Australian standard drink
- 150 ml (5.1 US fl oz) glass of wine (13.5% alcohol) = 1.5 Australian standard drinks
- One 5 US fl oz (150 ml) glass of 12% ABV table wine is one US standard drink.

=== Fortified wines ===
- A small glass (50 ml (1.7 US fl oz)) of sherry, fortified wine, or cream liqueur (≈20% ABV) contains about one unit.

=== Spirits ===
Most spirits sold in the United Kingdom have 35%-40% ABV. In England, a single pub measure (25 ml (0.85 US fl oz)) of a spirit contains one unit. However, a larger 35 ml (1.2 US fl oz) measure is increasingly used (and in particular is standard in Northern Ireland), which contains 1.4 units of alcohol at 40% ABV. Sellers of spirits by the glass must state the capacity of their standard measure in ml.

In Australia, a 30 ml (1.0 US fl oz) shot of spirits (40% ABV) is 0.95 standard drinks.

In the US, one shot of 80 proof liquor is 1.5 US fl oz (44 ml), which is one US standard drink.

Research shows that people tend to hugely overpour spirits when drinking at home.

=== Mixed spirits and alcopops ===
- Mixed cocktails can vary widely depending on the person mixing the drink and the recipe.
- 440 ml (15 US fl oz) can of pre-mix spirits (approx. 5% alcohol) = 1.7 Australian standard drinks
- 440 ml (15 US fl oz) can pre-mix spirits (approx. 7% alcohol) = 2.4 Australian standard drinks
- According to Alcohol and You Northern Ireland resource website, "Most alcopops contain 1.1–1.5 units per bottle. For example, a normal 275 ml (9.3 US fl oz) bottle of WKD contains 1.1 units, whereas Bacardi Breezer and Smirnoff Ice both contain 1.5 units of alcohol."

== Recommended maximum ==
From 1992 to 1995, the UK government advised that men should drink no more than 21 units per week, and women no more than 14. (The difference between the sexes was due to the typically lower weight and water-to-body-mass ratio of women). The Times claimed in October 2007 that these limits had been "plucked out of the air" and had no scientific basis.

This was changed after a government study showed that many people were in effect "saving up" their units and using them at the end of the week, a form of binge drinking. Since 1995 the advice was that regular consumption of 3–4 units a day for men, or 2–3 units a day for women, would not pose significant health risks, but that consistently drinking four or more units a day (men) or three or more units a day (women) is not advisable. These guidelines were updated in August 2016 by the Chief Medical Officers of each of the four regions of the UK. The emphasis shifted from a level that does not pose risk towards levels that pose a low risk. This shift in emphasis was on the basis of an evaluation of evidence about the levels and types of health harm from alcohol. In brief, the weekly guideline was no more than 14 units for both men and women, ideally spread evenly over three or more days, with alcohol-free days included. On a single occasion, the emphasis was on limiting drinks on a single occasion, and not drinking at all during pregnancy. Subsequently, research has suggested that the level of consumption that minimises health loss is zero, i.e. to protect health, it is better not to drink alcohol. However, a 2025 review by the National Academies of Sciences, Engineering, and Medicine concluded that while heavy alcohol use is clearly harmful, moderate alcohol consumption was associated with lower all-cause mortality compared to never consuming alcohol.

== Relation to blood alcohol content ==
As a rough guide, it takes about one hour for the body to metabolise (break down) one UK unit of alcohol, 10 ml (8 grams). However, this will vary with body weight, sex, age, personal metabolic rate, recent food intake, the type and strength of the alcohol, and medications taken. Alcohol may be metabolised more slowly if liver function is impaired. For other countries, it may be easiest to convert to UK units. For example, in the United States one standard drink contains 14 grams ≈ 1.75 units of alcohol, and so a US standard drink takes the body about an hour and three-quarters to process. Blood alcohol content can more accurately be estimated by using Widmark's formula.

== Labeling ==
Example of Wine Bottle label in accordance with UK voluntary health labelling scheme

Australia introduced standard drink labelling in the 1990s, and New Zealand followed with a labelling requirement starting in 2002. The labels were criticized for being too small to read. A focus group study found that most student drinkers used the labels to choose stronger drinks and identify the cheapest method of getting drunk, rather than to drink safely.

In the UK in March 2011, alcohol companies voluntarily pledged to the UK Department of Health to implement a health labelling scheme to provide more information about responsible drinking on alcohol labels and containers. The pledge stated:

"We will ensure that over 80% of products on shelf (by December 2013) will have labels with clear unit content, NHS guidelines and a warning about drinking when pregnant."

At the end of 2014, 101 companies had committed to the pledge labelling scheme.

There are five elements included within the overall labelling scheme, the first three being mandatory, and the last two optional:

1. Unit alcohol content per container (mandatory), and per serving (optional). Typical servings deliver 1–3 units of alcohol.
2. Chief Medical Officer's daily guidelines for lower-risk consumption
3. Pregnancy warning (in text or as a graphic)
4. Mention of "drinkaware.co.uk" (optional)
5. Responsibility statement (e.g., "please drink responsibly") (optional)

Further detailed specifications about the labelling scheme are available from the "Alcohol labelling tool kit".

Drinks companies had pledged to display the three mandatory items on 80% of drinks containers on shelves in the UK off-trade by the end of December 2013. A report published in November 2014, confirmed that UK drinks producers had delivered on that pledge with a 79.3% compliance with the pledge elements as measured by products on shelf. Compared with labels from 2008 on a like-for-like basis, information on Unit alcohol content had increased by 46%; 91% of products displayed alcohol and pregnancy warnings (18% in 2008); and 75% showed the Chief Medical Officers' lower risk daily guidelines (6% in 2008).

Studies published in 2021 in the UK showed that the label could be further enhanced by including pictures of units and a statement of the drinking guidelines - this would help people understand the recommended limits better.

== Controversy ==
Research shows that people tend to overpour wine and liquor. Therefore, people may think that they're consuming within the standard drink limits set by their country but in reality drinking much more.

Because the standard drink can be misleading for consumers, there are calls to promote moderate drinking through other means, including encouraging people to choose lower alcohol options, to drink more slowly, and to alternate between drinks with alcohol and drinks without alcohol.

== See also ==
- Alcoholic spirits measure
