= Alcohol and society =

The 2010 ISCD study "Drug Harms in the UK: a multi-criteria decision analysis" found that alcohol scored highest overall and in Economic cost, Injury, Family adversities, Environmental damage, and Community harm.

Alcohol and society have been closely intertwined for a large portion of human history. Some research suggests that our interactions with alcohol can be traced back to our primate ancestors. There are various implications that result from this extensive history between humans and alcohol. Alcoholic drinks can have a range of effects on the individual human, as well as human society as a whole. The topic of alcohol can also spark a variety of opinions on the subject. While some view it as a tool that can be used social situations or as a substance that can calm them down, others criticize it for the ways in which it can degrade human health. According to a 2024 World Health Organization (WHO) report, these harmful consequences of alcohol use result in 2.6 million deaths annually, accounting for 4.7% of all global deaths. Additionally, alcohol can have different uses and societal standards based on where people live and what demographics, cultures, and religions they are part of. The complex nature of society's interaction with this substance is indicative of the diverse way that it's used and perceived.

== Evolutionary history and alcohol consumption standards ==
Humans have had interactions with alcohol for an extensive period of time. Some of the earliest evidence points back to our primate ancestors. One hypothesis known as the "drunken monkey" hypothesis proposes that these ancestors were more attracted to riper fruits due to their increased sugar and ethanol content which provided an energy efficient and nutritional substance for consumption. The earliest physical evidence of alcohol production and consumption by humans was discovered by a Stanford research team in 2018. Near what is now known as Haifa, Israel, the research team discovered remnants of alcohol that ranged between 11,700-13,700 years old. More evidence of early human and alcohol interactions come from 7,000 B.C. in ancient China and 5,980 B.C. in Georgia. There are a variety of theories as to why humans began drinking alcohol in the first place. Some of those most prominent are due to its perceived nutritional value, medicinal abilities, as well as its ability to provide hydration when clean water wasn't readily available. Because alcohol could provide these advantages, it started as a substance used to better and prolong the human life. This provides a stark contrast to the unsafe way that some humans interact with alcohol today.

=== Standard drink ===
A standard drink is a measure of alcohol consumption representing a fixed amount of pure ethanol, used in relation to recommendations about alcohol consumption and its relative risks to health. The size of a standard drink varies from 8g to 20g across countries, but 10g alcohol (12.7 milliliters) is used in the WHO Alcohol Use Disorders Identification Test (AUDIT)'s questionnaire form example, and has been adopted by more countries than any other amount.

=== Consumption recommendations ===
Share of over-fifteen-year-old population who have not drunk alcohol in the past year (interactive version); in most countries, it exceeds a third.

The recommended maximum intake (or safe limits) of alcohol varies from no intake, to daily, weekly, or daily/weekly guidelines provided by health agencies of governments. The WHO published a statement in The Lancet Public Health in April 2023 that "there is no safe amount that does not affect health".

According to the U.S. Department of Agriculture, based on NHANES 2013–2014 surveys, women in the US ages 20 and up consume on average 6.8 grams/day and men consume on average 15.5 grams/day. A March 2023 review found light-moderate daily drinking not significantly associated with increased mortality rate, but higher intake raises risk, with women affected at lower levels than men. However, according to a 2024 systematic review and meta-analysis, even at 20 g/day (1 large beer), the risk of developing an alcohol use disorder (AUD) is nearly 3 times higher than non-drinkers, and the risk of dying from an AUD is about 2 times higher than non-drinkers.

== Misconceptions ==
While the terms "drug" and "medicine" are sometimes used interchangeably, "drug" can have a negative connotation, often associated with illegal substances like cocaine or heroin.

The term narcotic usually refers to opiates or opioids, which are called narcotic analgesics. In common parlance and legal usage, it is often used imprecisely to mean illicit drugs, irrespective of their pharmacology. However, in countries with alcohol prohibition, it is classified and treated as a narcotic. Also, research acknowledges that alcohol can have similar effects to narcotics in head and/or trunk trauma situations. In addition to these findings, recent research indicates that among chronic pain patients on long-term opioid therapy, alcohol consumption is connected to heightened opioid cravings.

The normalization of alcohol consumption, along with past misconceptions about its health benefits, also promoted by the industry, further reinforces the mistaken idea that it is not a "drug". Even within the realm of scientific inquiry, the common phrase "drugs and alcohol" persists, implying that alcohol is somehow separate from other drugs.

Criticism of the alcohol industry may note that the industry argues that "alcohol is not a drug". Also, some religious organizations, such as the Catholic Church, requires alcoholic sacramental wine in the Eucharist and do not explicitly categorize alcohol as a "drug" in the same manner as illicit substances. This practice has been a longstanding tradition within the Church, reflecting its historical, theological significance, and normalization of alcohol use within its rituals. However, the term "Alcohol and Other Drugs", a term frequently used by public health authorities, emphasizes this inclusion by grouping alcohol with other substances that alter mood and behavior.

Paradoxically, despite being legal, alcohol, scientifically classified as a drug, has demonstrably been linked to greater social harm than most illegal drugs. This contradicts the perception some hold of alcohol being a harmless substance.

== Laws, policies, and initiatives ==
=== Legal status ===
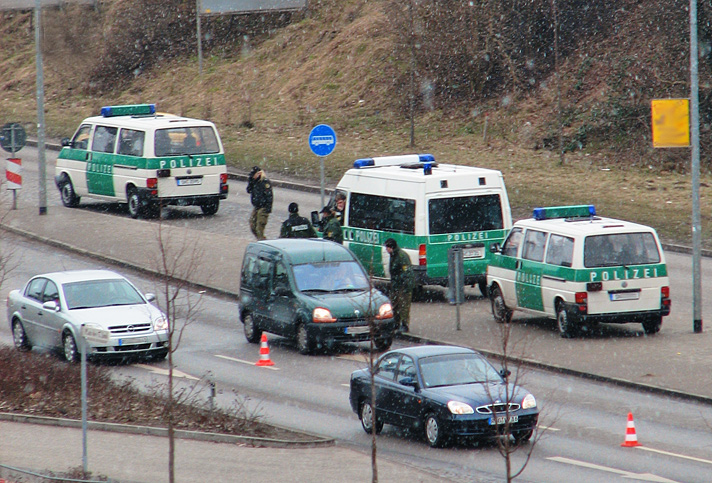
Sobriety checkpoint in Stralsund, Germany

Alcohol consumption is fully legal and available in most countries of the world. Home made alcoholic beverages with low alcohol content like wine, and beer is also legal in most countries, but distilling moonshine outside of a registered distillery remains illegal in most of them.

Some majority-Muslim countries, such as Saudi Arabia, Kuwait, Pakistan, Iran and Libya prohibit the production, sale, and consumption of alcoholic beverages because they are forbidden by Islam. Laws banning alcohol consumption are found in some Indian states as well as some Native American reservations in the U.S.

In addition, there are regulations on alcohol sales and use in many countries throughout the world. For instance, the majority of countries have a minimum legal drinking age to purchase or consume alcoholic beverages, although there are often exceptions such as underage consumption of small amounts of alcohol with parental supervision. Also, some countries have bans on public intoxication. Drinking while driving or intoxicated driving is frequently outlawed and it may be illegal to have an open container of alcohol or liquor bottle in an automobile, bus or aircraft.

In Iran, consumption of alcohol (one glass) is punished by 80 lashes, but repeated offenses may lead to death penalty, although rarely exercised. In 2012, two men were sentenced to death after a third offense in Khorasan.

=== Minimum pricing policies ===
The "R" in WHO's SAFER initiative stands for "Raise prices on alcohol through excise taxes and pricing policies," emphasizing the importance of economic measures to mitigate alcohol-related harm.

The Alcohol (Minimum Pricing) (Scotland) Act 2012 is an Act of the Scottish Parliament, which introduces a statutory minimum price for alcohol, initially 50p per unit, as an element in the program to counter alcohol problems.

The Liquor Act 2019 is an act enacted and signed into legislation by the Northern Territory Legislative Assembly in 2019, which introduces a statutory minimum price for alcohol in order to counter alcohol problems.

The Public Health (Minimum Price for Alcohol) (Wales) Act 2018 (anaw 5) is an Act of the National Assembly for Wales, which introduces a statutory minimum price for alcohol, initially 50p per unit, as an element in the programme to counter alcohol problems.

Austria, Switzerland and Germany determine that a barkeeper has to offer one or more non-alcoholic beverages at a cheaper price than any alcoholic drink. Before the so-called Apfelsaft-Paragraph (apple juice clause) was established in Germany in 2002 beer was often the cheapest beverage available.

=== Alcohol packaging warning messages ===
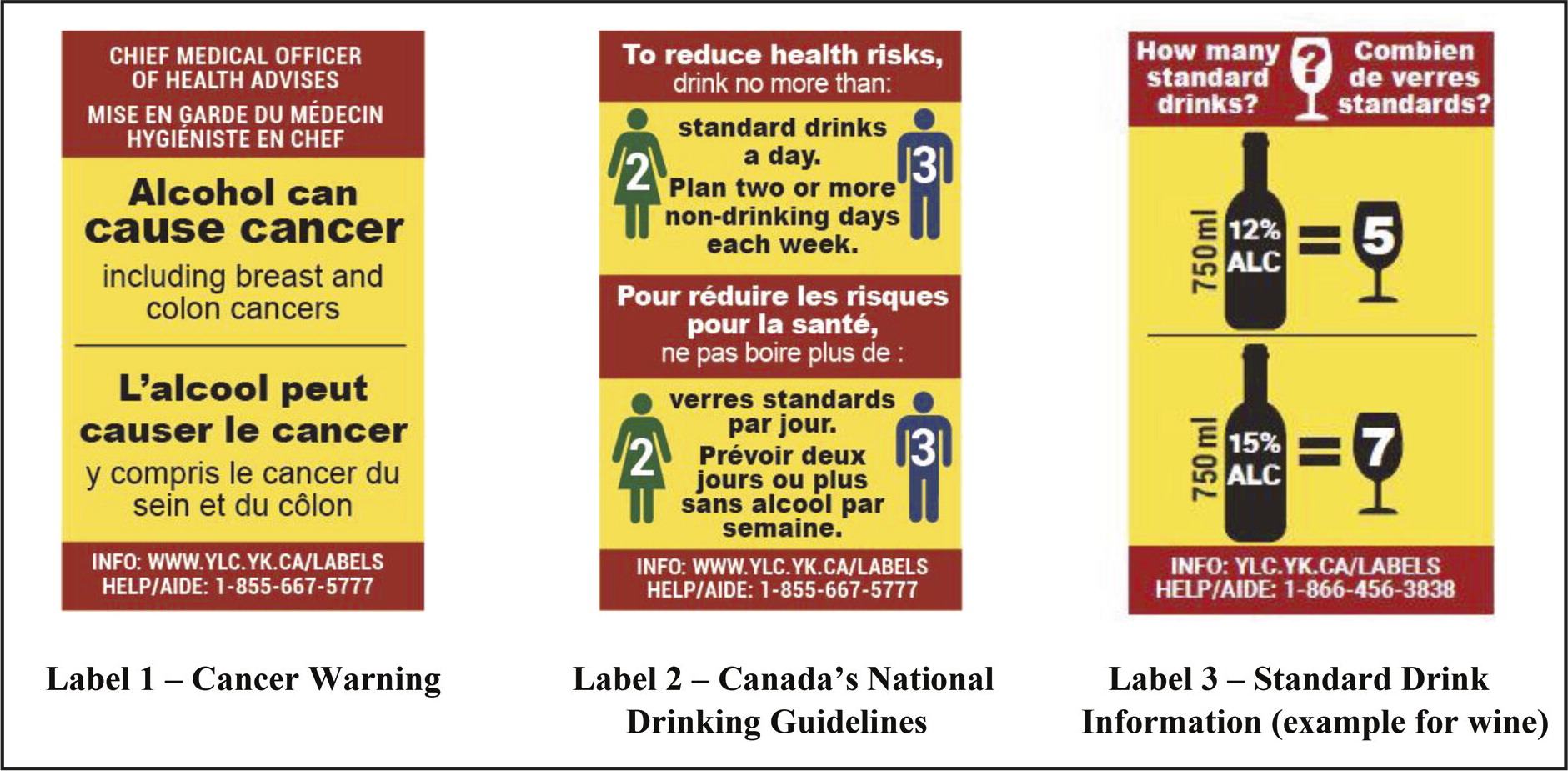
Intervention alcohol warning labels (actual size 5.0 cm × 3.2 cm each). The label intervention included three rotating labels: (a) a cancer warning, (b) national drinking guidelines, and (c) standard drink information (four separate labels were developed for wine, spirits, coolers, and beer; wine example shown above)

Alcohol packaging warning messages (alcohol warning labels, AWLs) are warning messages that appear on the packaging of alcoholic drinks concerning their health effects.

A WHO report, published in 2017, stated:

Alcohol product labelling could be considered as a component of a comprehensive public health strategy to reduce alcohol-related harm. Adding health labels to alcohol containers is an important first step in raising awareness and has a longer-term utility in helping to establish a social understanding of the harmful use of alcohol.

=== Alcohol server training ===
Alcohol server training is a form of occupational education typically provided to servers, sellers and consumers of alcohol to prevent intoxication, drunk driving and underage drinking. This training is sometimes regulated and mandated by state and local laws, predominantly in North America, and increasingly in other English-speaking countries such as Australia. In some places, such as Australia, gaining such qualifications is required by law, before one can work to sell alcohol.

=== Parental supervision of alcohol consumption for minors ===
Some parents are willing to provide alcohol for their children if they drink it in a controlled environment. Furnishing alcohol to one's own children is permitted in 31 states, while it's illegal to do so for other people's children in all fifty states. However, despite research indicating negative consequences, many parents mistakenly believe that providing alcohol to their underage children will protect them from drinking-related harm. This misconception persists even though studies have shown a connection between parental alcohol supply and unfavorable outcomes related to alcohol consumption among minors. Parental provision of alcohol during childhood may raise the risk of risky drinking in adolescence. However, methodological limitations hinder causal conclusions. To clarify this relationship, more robust longitudinal studies are needed that differentiate between sips and full drinks, accurately measure confounding factors, and apply multivariable adjustments.

Parental attitudes that are less restrictive regarding children's alcohol consumption are linked to an earlier onset of alcohol use, increased frequency of use, and higher instances of drunkenness among children. Additionally, when children perceive their parents as having more lenient attitudes towards alcohol, they are more likely to engage in drinking themselves. Adolescents permitted to drink by their parents were more likely to quickly move from their first drink to binge drinking (5 or more drinks at once) and heavy drinking (3 or more times in the past year). These findings contradict the belief that parental approval of underage drinking protects against alcohol misuse, highlighting the risks associated with adolescent heavy drinking.

Parents may face significant legal consequences in various countries and jurisdictions if they knowingly allow their children to drink alcohol without supervision. This liability arises from a perceived failure to protect the child from the risks associated with alcohol consumption, which could lead to investigations by child protective services.

=== Alcohol-use initiatives ===
United Nations Sustainable Development Goal 3 is part of "The Alcohol Policy Playbook"

United Nations Sustainable Development Goal 3 is part of "The Alcohol Policy Playbook," which is a resource for reaching the goals of the WHO European Framework for Action on Alcohol (2022–2025) and the WHO Global Alcohol Action Plan (2022–2030).

The Global Information System on Alcohol and Health (GISAH) is a tool developed by the WHO to collect and analyze data on alcohol consumption, related health issues, and policy responses in countries.

The WHO's SAFER initiative aims to reduce alcohol-related harm through a comprehensive set of strategies. The components of the initiative are as follows:

- Strengthen restrictions on alcohol availability
- Advance and enforce drink driving countermeasures
- Facilitate access to screening, brief interventions, and treatment
- Enforce bans or comprehensive restrictions on alcohol advertising, sponsorship, and promotion
- Raise prices on alcohol through excise taxes and pricing policies

=== Denormalization ===
In October 2024, the WHO Regional Office for Europe launched the "Redefine alcohol" campaign to address alcohol-related health risks, as alcohol causes nearly 1 in 11 deaths in the region. The campaign aims to raise awareness about alcohol's link to over 200 diseases, including several cancers, and to encourage healthier choices by sharing research and personal stories. It also calls for stricter regulation of alcohol to reduce its societal harm. This initiative is part of the WHO/EU Evidence into Action Alcohol Project, which seeks to reduce alcohol-related harm across Europe.

== Criticism of the alcohol industry ==
A 2019 survey conducted by the American Institute for Cancer Research (AICR) showed that only 45% of Americans were aware of the associated risk of cancer due to alcohol consumption, up from 39% in 2017. The AICR believes that alcohol advertising about the healthy cardiovascular benefits of modest alcohol overshadow messages about the increased cancer risks.

The alcohol industry has tried to market its products to appeal to impressionable youth and young adults.

Drinking alcoholic beverages increase the risk for breast cancer. Several studies indicate that the use of marketing by the alcohol industry to associate their products with breast cancer awareness campaigns, known as pinkwashing, is misleading and potentially harmful.

Alcohol industries have marketed products directly to the LGBT+ community. In 2010, of the sampled parades that listed sponsors, 61% of the prides were sponsored by the alcohol industry. A study found that alcohol consumption within LGBTQ+ communities presents a challenge for health promotion efforts. The positive association with alcohol within these communities makes it harder to reduce alcohol-related health issues.

== Sobriety ==
=== Teetotalism ===
Teetotalism is the practice of never consuming alcohol, specifically in alcoholic drinks. A person who practices (and possibly advocates) teetotalism is called a teetotaler (US) or teetotaller (UK), or said to be teetotal. Globally, in 2016, 57% of adults did not drink alcohol in the past 12 months, and 44.5% had never consumed alcohol. A number of temperance organizations have been founded in order to promote teetotalism and provide spaces for non-drinkers to socialize.

=== Intermittent sobriety ===
Intermittent sobriety refers to planned periods of abstinence from alcohol, often as part of awareness campaigns or personal health initiatives.

Notable examples include:

- Dry January: An annual campaign encouraging people to abstain from alcohol for the month of January.
- Dry July: A similar initiative held in July, often with a fundraising component for cancer-related charities.
- Ocsober: An October-based challenge to abstain from alcohol.

=== Sober curious ===
Global per capita alcohol consumption has shown a downward trajectory since the 20th century, suggesting a shift towards prioritizing health and well-being.

Sober curious is a recent cultural movement and lifestyle that focuses on consuming no or limited alcohol for wellness purposes. The movement gained traction through the promotion by social media influencers.

It differs from traditional abstinence in that it is not founded on asceticism, religious condemnation of alcohol or previous alcohol abuse, but motivated by a curiosity of a sober lifestyle. Markets have reacted by offering a wider selection of non-alcoholic beverages.

Sober curiosity is often defined as having the option to question or change one's drinking habits, for mental or physical health reasons. It may be practiced in many ways, ranging from complete abstinence to more thought about when and how much is consumed.

Since the onset of the COVID-19 pandemic, more people in Europe have reduced their alcohol consumption.

== Social uses of alcohol ==
=== Drinking culture ===
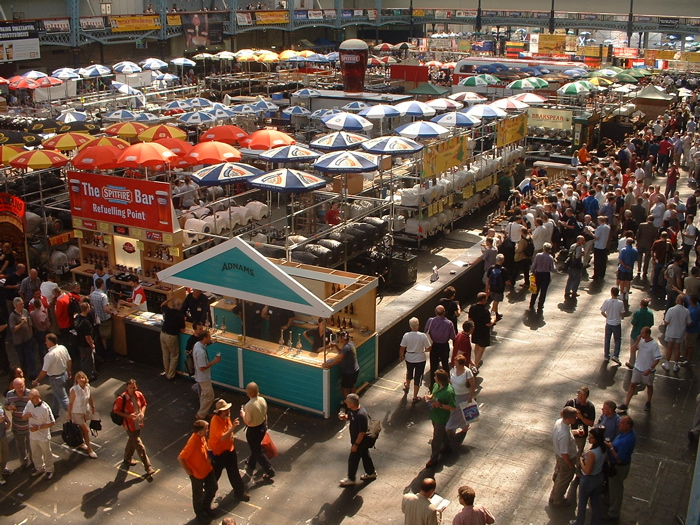
Great British Beer Festival, London

Drinking alcohol is generally socially acceptable and is legal in most countries, unlike with many other recreational substances. Many students attending colleges, universities, and other higher education institutions consume alcoholic beverages. However, there are often restrictions on alcohol sale and use, for instance a minimum age for drinking and laws against public drinking and drinking and driving. A 2024 meta-analysis found that alcohol consumption increased on average each year, with the most significant rise occurring between the ages of 12 and 13. Drinking peaked around 22 years old, then began to decline at 24.

Alcohol holds considerable societal and cultural significance, playing a role in social interactions across much of the world. Drinking establishments, such as bars and nightclubs, revolve primarily around the sale and consumption of alcoholic beverages, and parties, festivals, and social gatherings commonly involve alcohol consumption. Alcohol is related to various societal problems, including drunk driving, accidental injuries, sexual assaults, domestic abuse, and violent crime. Alcohol remains illegal for sale and consumption in a number of countries, mainly in the Middle East.

Research on the societal benefits of alcohol is rare, but a 2017 study suggested there it was beneficial. Alcohol is often used as a social lubricant; it increases occurrences of Duchenne smiling, talking, and social bonding, even when participants are unaware of their alcohol consumption or lack thereof. In a study of the UK, regular drinking was correlated with happiness, feeling that life was worthwhile, and life satisfaction. According to a causal path analysis the cause was vice versa; alcohol consumption was not the cause, but rather that the life satisfaction resulted in greater happiness and an inclination to visit pubs and develop a regular drinking venue. City centre bars were distinguished by their focus on maximizing alcohol sales. Community pubs had less variation in visible group sizes and longer, more focused conversations than those in city centre bars. Drinking regularly at a community pub led to higher trust in others and better networking with the local community, compared to non-drinkers and city centre bar drinkers.

=== Drinking games ===
Drinking games are popular social activities, particularly among young adults and college students, but they come with significant health risks. These games often encourage rapid alcohol consumption, often leading to binge drinking, which can result in severe consequences such as alcohol poisoning:

- Beer pong. Some writers have mentioned beer pong as contributing to "out of control" college drinking.
- Power hour. Players may have difficulty completing the specified number of drinks as the rate of consumption can raise their blood alcohol content to high levels.
- Keg stand is another drinking game known for its extreme consumption style.
- Neknominate. The original rules of the game require the participants to film themselves drinking a pint of an alcoholic beverage. Five people are believed to have died as a result of playing the game, including a Cardiff man thought to have downed a pint of vodka, and a London hostel worker who reportedly mixed an entire bottle of white wine with a quarter bottle of whisky, a small bottle of vodka and a can of lager. In the latter case, the victim's nominator was interviewed by police, but it was ruled an accidental death without coercion.

=== Sports culture ===
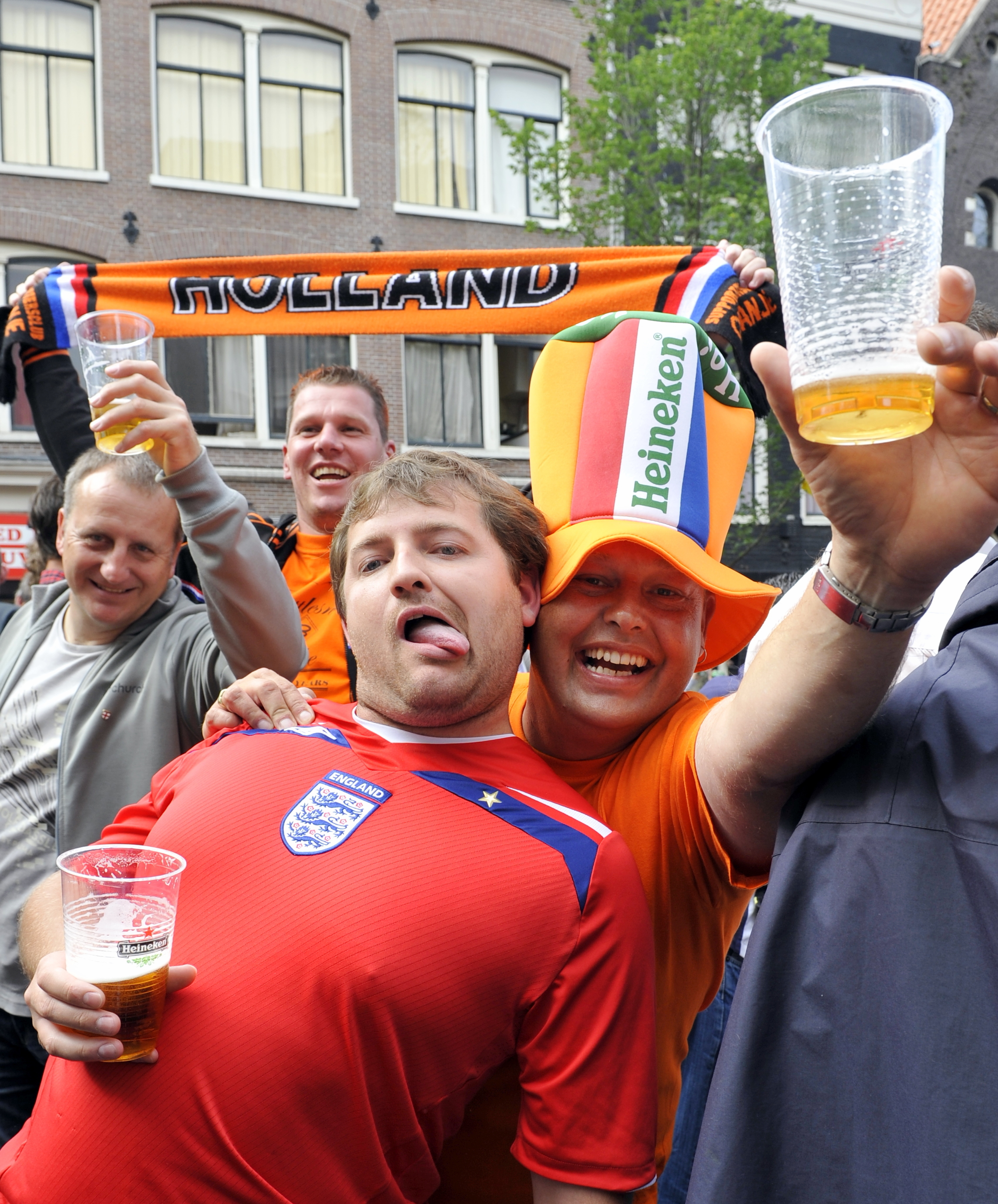
English and Dutch football fans drinking together in 2009

Alcohol in association football has long been a complex issue, with significant cultural and behavioral implications. Football is widely observed in various settings such as television broadcasts, sports bars, and arenas, contributing to the drinking culture surrounding the sport. A 2007 study at the University of Texas at Austin monitored the drinking habits of 541 students over two football seasons. It revealed that high-profile game days ranked among the heaviest drinking occasions, similar to New Year's Eve. Male students increased their consumption for all games, while socially active female students drank heavily during away games. Lighter drinkers also showed a higher likelihood of risky behaviors during away games as their intoxication increased. This research highlights specific drinking patterns linked to collegiate sports events.

=== Work-related ===
Overwork is linked to an increased risk of unhealthy alcohol consumption. Also, unemployment can heighten the risk of alcohol consumption and smoking. As many as 15% of employees show problematic alcohol-related behaviors in the workplace, such as drinking before going to work or even drinking on the job.

== Common behavioral implications linked to alcohol use ==
=== Alcohol and the Human Brain ===
In order to understand all the implications that alcohol has on society, it is important that the effects of alcohol are understood at the neurological level. While the process of absorbing alcohol involves the entire body, the brain is especially impacted. In general, the brain's communication pathways and information processing are greatly altered when alcohol is in the human body. How much the brain is effected depends upon blood alcohol content (BAC). When someone has a minimal to moderate BAC, symptoms can include feelings of euphoria, excitement, and confusion, impaired motor skills, impaired judgement, nausea, and memory loss. When one has a severe BAC level, they are at risk of injury, suffocation, coma, and death. Alcohol can result in irreversible damage when consumption is severe enough. While alcohol can provide a feeling of relief from the stressors occurring in one's life, it's important to note that this relief is temporary. The urge to make this feeling of relief constant in one's life can lead to an addiction cycle that is similar to other forms of drug use which includes intoxication, withdrawal, and anticipation.

=== Risky sexual behavior ===
Some studies have made a connection between hookup culture and substance use. Most students said that their hookups occurred after drinking alcohol. Frietas stated that in her study, the relationships between drinking and the party scene and between alcohol and hookup culture were "impossible to miss".

Studies suggest that the degree of alcoholic intoxication in young people directly correlates with the level of risky behavior, such as engaging in multiple sex partners.

In 2018, the first study of its kind, found that alcohol and caffeinated energy drinks is linked with casual, risky sex among college-age adults.

==== Sexually transmitted infections and unintended pregnancy ====
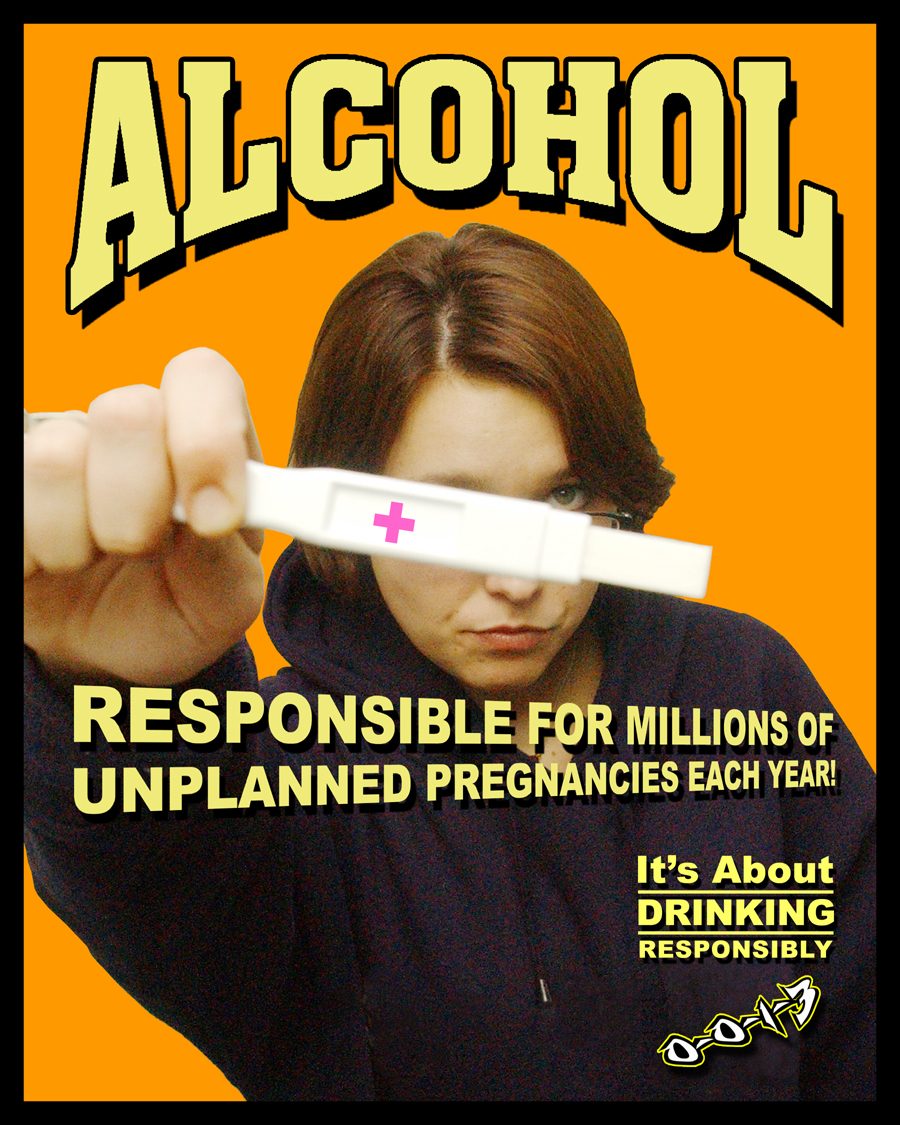
A 0-0-1-3 media campaign poster specifically highlighting that responsible alcohol use may prevent risky sexual behavior that often results in unplanned pregnancy

Alcohol intoxication is associated with an increased risk that people will become involved in risky sexual behaviors, such as unprotected sex. Both men, and women, reported higher intentions to avoid using a condom when they were intoxicated by alcohol.

Coitus interruptus, also known as withdrawal, pulling out or the pull-out method, is a method of birth control during penetrative sexual intercourse, whereby the penis is withdrawn from a vagina or anus prior to ejaculation so that the ejaculate (semen) may be directed away in an effort to avoid insemination. Coitus interruptus carries a risk of sexually transmitted infections (STIs) and unintended pregnancy. This risk is especially high during alcohol intoxication because lowered sexual inhibition can make it difficult to withdraw in time.

Women with unintended pregnancies are more likely to smoke tobacco, drink alcohol during pregnancy, and binge drink during pregnancy, which results in poorer health outcomes. (See also: fetal alcohol spectrum disorder)

The relationship between drinking alcohol and how HIV develops and progresses in people has been the subject of prior research investigations. To date, HIV has been recognized as an alcohol-attributable STI in the WHO's most recent comparative risk assessment or related exercises.

=== Hurtful communication ===
Alcohol may cause hurtful communication.

==== Drunk dialing ====
Drunk dialing refers to an intoxicated person making phone calls that they would not likely make if sober, often a lonely individual calling former or current love interests.

A 2021 study that examined the relationship between drunk texting and emotional dysregulation found a positive correlation. The findings suggest that interventions targeting emotional regulation skills may be beneficial.

==== In vino veritas ====
In vino veritas is a Latin phrase that means 'in wine, there is truth', suggesting a person under the influence of alcohol is more likely to speak their hidden thoughts and desires.

=== Alcohol-related crimes ===
Alcohol-related crime refers to criminal activities that involve alcohol use as well as violations of regulations covering the sale or use of alcohol; in other words, activities violating the alcohol laws. Some crimes are uniquely tied to alcohol, such as public intoxication or underage drinking, while others are simply more likely to occur together with alcohol consumption. Underage drinking and drunk driving are the most prevalent alcohol-specific offenses in the United States and a major problem in many, if not most, countries worldwide. Similarly, about one-third of arrests in the United States involve alcohol misuse, and arrests for alcohol-related crimes constitute a high proportion of all arrests made by police in the US and elsewhere.

=== Binge drinking ===
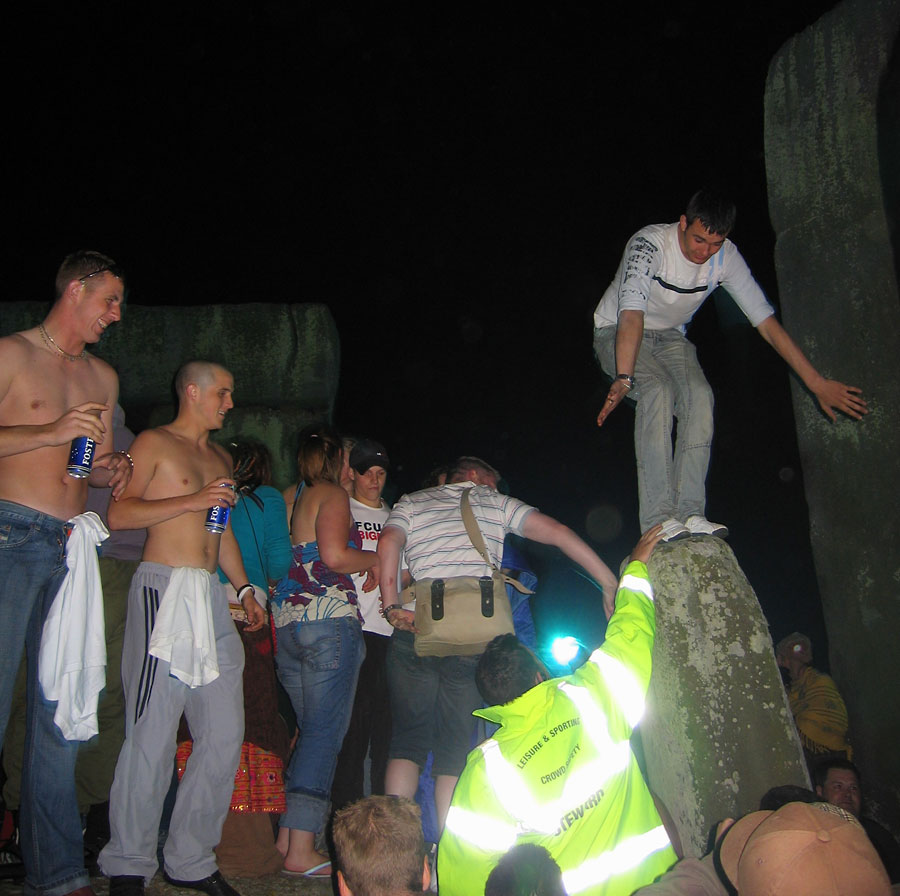
Binge drinking can prompt police action for public intoxication and disturbing the peace.

Binge drinking is a style of drinking that is popular in several countries worldwide, and overlaps somewhat with social drinking since it is often done in groups. The degree of intoxication however, varies between and within various cultures that engage in this practice. A binge on alcohol can occur over hours, last up to several days, or in the event of extended abuse, even weeks. Due to the long term effects of alcohol abuse, binge drinking is considered to be a major public health issue.

Binge drinking is more common in males, during adolescence and young adulthood. Heavy regular binge drinking is associated with adverse effects on neurologic, cardiac, gastrointestinal, hematologic, immune, and musculoskeletal organ systems as well as increasing the risk of alcohol induced psychiatric disorders. A US-based review of the literature found that up to one-third of adolescents binge-drink, with 6% reaching the threshold of having an alcohol-related substance use disorder. Approximately one in 25 women binge-drinks during pregnancy, which can lead to fetal alcohol syndrome and fetal alcohol spectrum disorders. Binge drinking during adolescence is associated with traffic accidents and other types of accidents, violent behavior as well as suicide. The more often a child or adolescent binge drinks and the younger they are the more likely that they will develop an alcohol use disorder including alcoholism. A large number of adolescents who binge-drink also consume other psychotropic substances.

Addiction experts in psychiatry, chemistry, pharmacology, forensic science, epidemiology, and the police and legal services engaged in delphic analysis regarding 20 popular recreational substances. Alcohol was ranked 2nd in social harm, 6th in dependence, and 11th in physical harm.

=== Societal damage ===
Alcohol causes a plethora of detrimental effects in society. A 2023 systematic review estimated the societal costs of alcohol use to be around 2.6% of the GDP. Many emergency room visits involve alcohol use. Alcohol availability and consumption rates and alcohol rates are positively associated with nuisance, loitering, panhandling, and disorderly conduct in public space.

A 2011 study challenged the perception of heroin as the more dangerous substance. The research suggests, when considering the wider social, physical, and financial costs, alcohol may be more harmful.

Individuals who engage with or share alcohol-related content on social networking services tend to exhibit higher levels of alcohol use and related issues.

== Different demographics and their alcohol use ==
=== Racial and ethnic groups ===
Varying trends of alcohol use can be correlated to certain racial groups and ethnicities. For example, compared to other racial and ethic groups, White Americans and Native Americans have a higher risk of developing alcohol use disorders. Specifically for Native Americans, 11.7% of all deaths are related to alcohol. By comparison, about 5.9% of global deaths are attributable to alcohol consumption. Additionally, Hispanic Americans are the least likely to receive treatment for alcohol use disorders in the United States. The differences in alcohol use and many other types of substance use among racial groups and ethnicities can often be attributed to systemic issues involving negative stereotypes and biases based on race.

=== Genders ===
Gaps in alcohol use based on gender exist everywhere. These gaps can vary depending on different countries and cultures. On a global level, alcohol consumption is typically an activity that's dominated by men. This trend also exists in the United States. On average, men consume three times the amount of alcohol that women do. Men also face more alcohol related harm than women do such as injury and death. One possible explanation for this increased consumption is due to the fact that women are affected by smaller amounts of alcohol compared to men which could cause them to consume less of it. Another explanation for these differences is varying societal standards that are associated with drinking. In the United States, there are increased feelings of disapproval associated with heavy drinkers that are women than are men. It's important to note that these trends are subject to change. Recent data from a study done in 2021 from the National Institute on Alcohol Abuse and Alcoholism found that women were binge-drinking more than men for the first time in history.

=== Religious groups ===
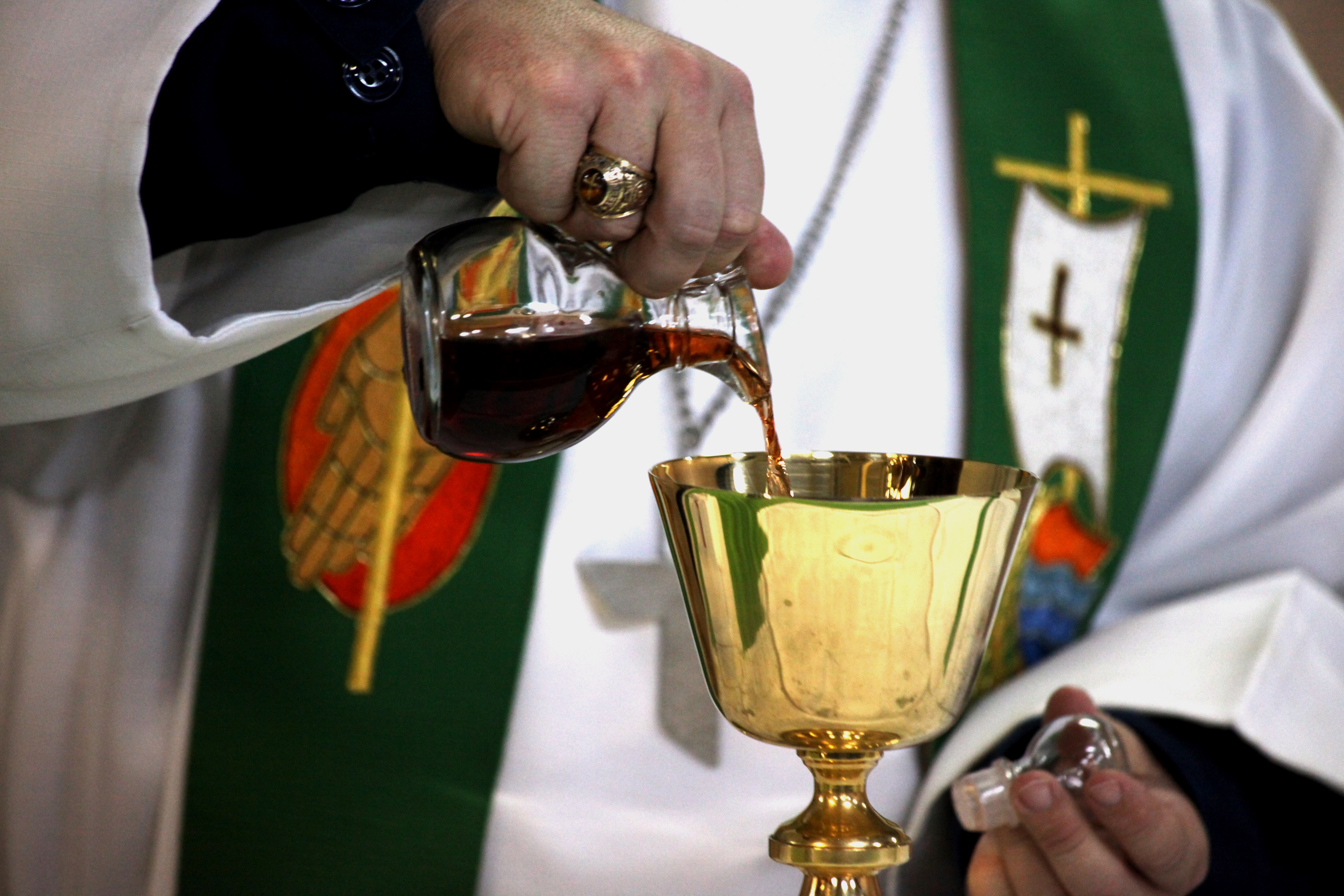
A chaplain pouring sacramental wine from a cruet into a chalice

The relationship between religion and alcohol exhibits variations across cultures, geographical areas, and religious denominations. Some religions emphasize moderation and responsible use as a means of honoring the divine gift of life, while others impose outright bans on alcohol as a means of honoring the divine gift of life. Moreover, within the same religious tradition, there are many adherents that may interpret and practice their faith's teachings on alcohol in diverse ways. Hence, a wide range of factors, such as religious affiliation, levels of religiosity, cultural traditions, family influences, and peer networks, collectively influence the dynamics of this relationship.

The levels of alcohol use in spiritual context can be broken down into:

- Prohibition: Some religions, including Islam prohibit alcohol consumption.
- Symbolic use: In some Christian denominations, the sacramental wine is alcoholic, however, only a sip is taken, and it does not raise the blood alcohol content, and other denominations are using nonalcoholic wine. See also Libation.
- Discourage consumption: Hinduism does not have a central authority which is followed by all Hindus, though religious texts generally discourage the use or consumption of alcohol.
- Inebriating spiritual use: See the spiritual section.

=== Secularity ===
In some cultures, including those with religious traditions, consuming alcohol in moderation to celebrate joyful occasions is accepted in a non-religious, secular context.

During the Jewish holiday of Purim, Jews are obligated to drink (especially Kosher wine) until their judgmental abilities become impaired according to the Book of Esther. However, Purim has more of a national than a religious character.

=== College students ===
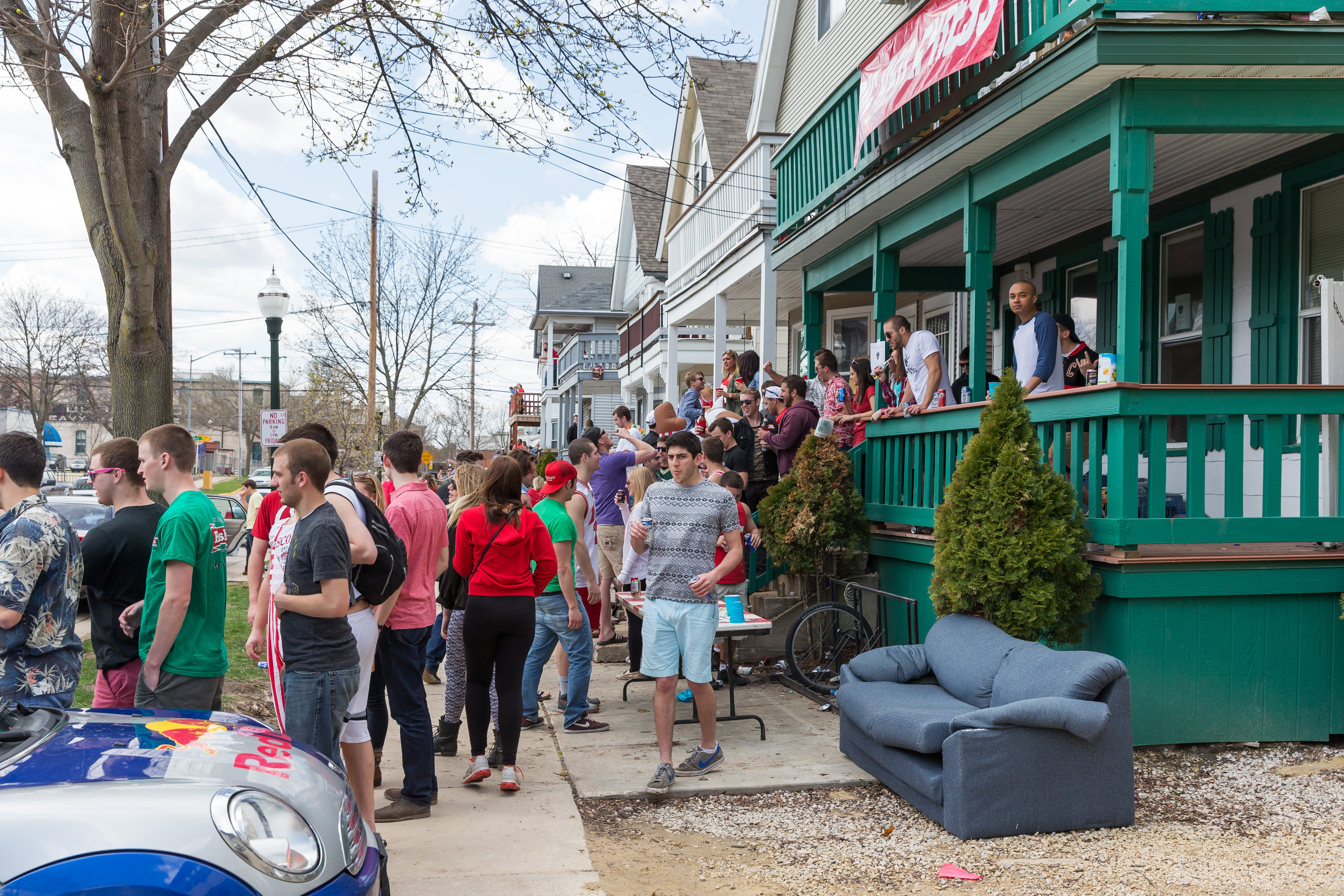
A house party used to draw huge crowds of college-aged people celebrating an alcohol-aided rite of Spring.

Many students attending colleges, universities, and other higher education institutions consume alcoholic beverages. The laws and social culture around this practice vary by country and institution type, and within an institution, some students may drink heavily whereas others may not drink at all. In the United States, drinking tends to be particularly associated with fraternities.

List of hazing deaths in the United States highlights a troubling trend, as there has been at least one university hazing death each year from 1969 to 2021. Over 200 university hazing deaths have occurred since 1838, with 40 deaths between 2007 and 2017 alone. Alcohol poisoning is the biggest cause of death.

Alcohol abuse among college students refers to unhealthy alcohol drinking behaviors by college and university students. While the legal drinking age varies by country, the high number of underage students that consume alcohol has presented many problems and consequences for universities. The causes of alcohol abuse tend to be peer pressure, fraternity or sorority involvement, and stress. College students who abuse alcohol can suffer from health concerns, poor academic performance or legal consequences. Prevention and treatment include campus counseling, stronger enforcement of underage drinking or changing the campus culture.

Recent research indicates that the abundance of alcohol retailers and the availability of inexpensive alcoholic beverages are linked to heavy alcohol consumption among college students.

=== LGBTQ+ community ===
Research shows that people who are part of the LGBTQ+ community typically have higher rates of alcohol consumption compared to the general population. For example, a study completed in 2018 found that alcohol use in gay, lesbian, and bisexual people ages 18–25 was 64.3% which was 9.2% higher than the alcohol use of the general population. Other studies show many similar findings in other LGBTQ+ populations across the world. Additionally, the alcohol industries have marketed products directly to the LGBT+ community. In 2010, of the sampled parades that listed sponsors, 61% of the prides were sponsored by the alcohol industry. A study found that alcohol consumption within LGBTQ+ communities presents a challenge for health promotion efforts. The positive association with alcohol within these communities makes it harder to reduce alcohol-related health issues.

=== Psychosocial factors ===
Research has shown that various psychosocial factors can influence alcohol consumption patterns throughout an individual's life.

A 2024 study from UT Southwestern Medical Center indicates that higher IQ during high school is linked to a greater likelihood of moderate or heavy drinking in midlife, with each one-point increase in IQ correlating to a 1.7% higher probability of such drinking. The study also found that this relationship is influenced by psychosocial factors, particularly income and career stress, highlighting the need for further research in diverse populations.

== Extreme consequences ==
=== Emotional issues ===
In emotional self-regulation, some people turn to drugs such as alcohol. Drug use, an example of response modulation, can be used to alter emotion-associated physiological responses. For example, alcohol can produce sedative and anxiolytic effects. A 2013 study found that immature defense mechanisms are linked to placing a higher value on junk food, alcohol, and television.

There is a two-way street between loneliness and drinking. People who drink more than once a week tend to feel lonelier, according to a study on Japanese workers during the COVID-19 pandemic. On the other hand, feelings of loneliness can also lead people to drink more, as shown in a separate study. Loneliness is a major risk factor for depression and alcoholism.

=== Homelessness ===
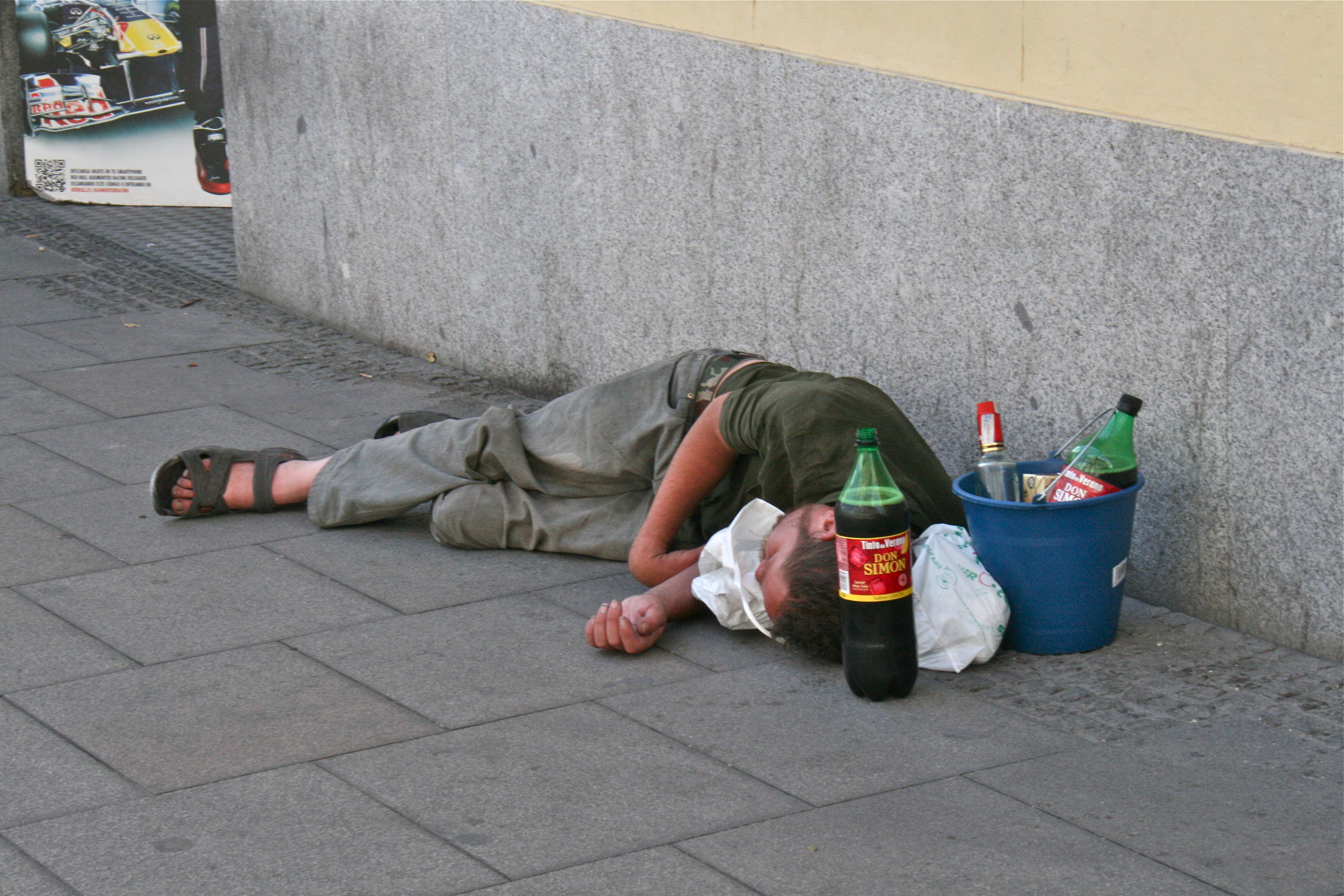
A man lies on the street next to his belongings after having been drinking.

Conditions such as alcoholism and mental illness are often associated with homelessness. For people in Russia, especially the youth, alcohol, and substance use is a major cause and reason for becoming and continuing to be homeless. Also, street children from areas with limited resources have reported a high lifetime prevalence of substance use. The most commonly used substances are inhalants, followed by tobacco, alcohol, and marijuana.

=== Suicide ===
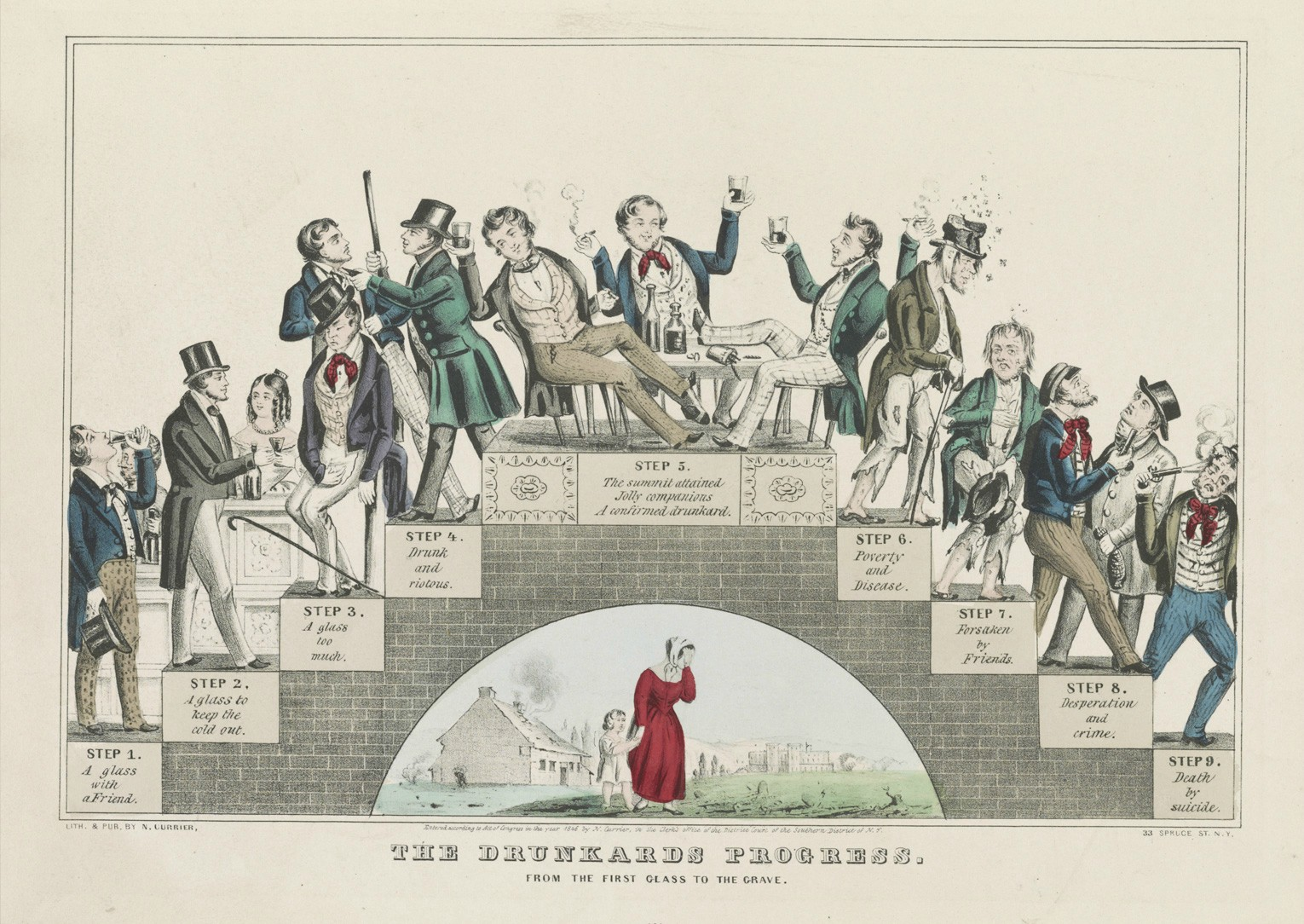
The Drunkard's Progress: from the first glass to the grave, shows how a single drink starts an arc that ends in suicide.

Most people are under the influence of sedative-hypnotic drugs (such as alcohol or benzodiazepines) when they die by suicide, with alcoholism present in between 15% and 61% of cases. Countries that have higher rates of alcohol use and a greater density of bars generally also have higher rates of suicide. About 2.2–3.4% of those who have been treated for alcoholism at some point in their life die by suicide. Alcoholics who attempt suicide are usually male, older, and have tried to take their own lives in the past. In adolescents who misuse alcohol, neurological and psychological dysfunctions may contribute to the increased risk of suicide.

=== Occupational risks ===
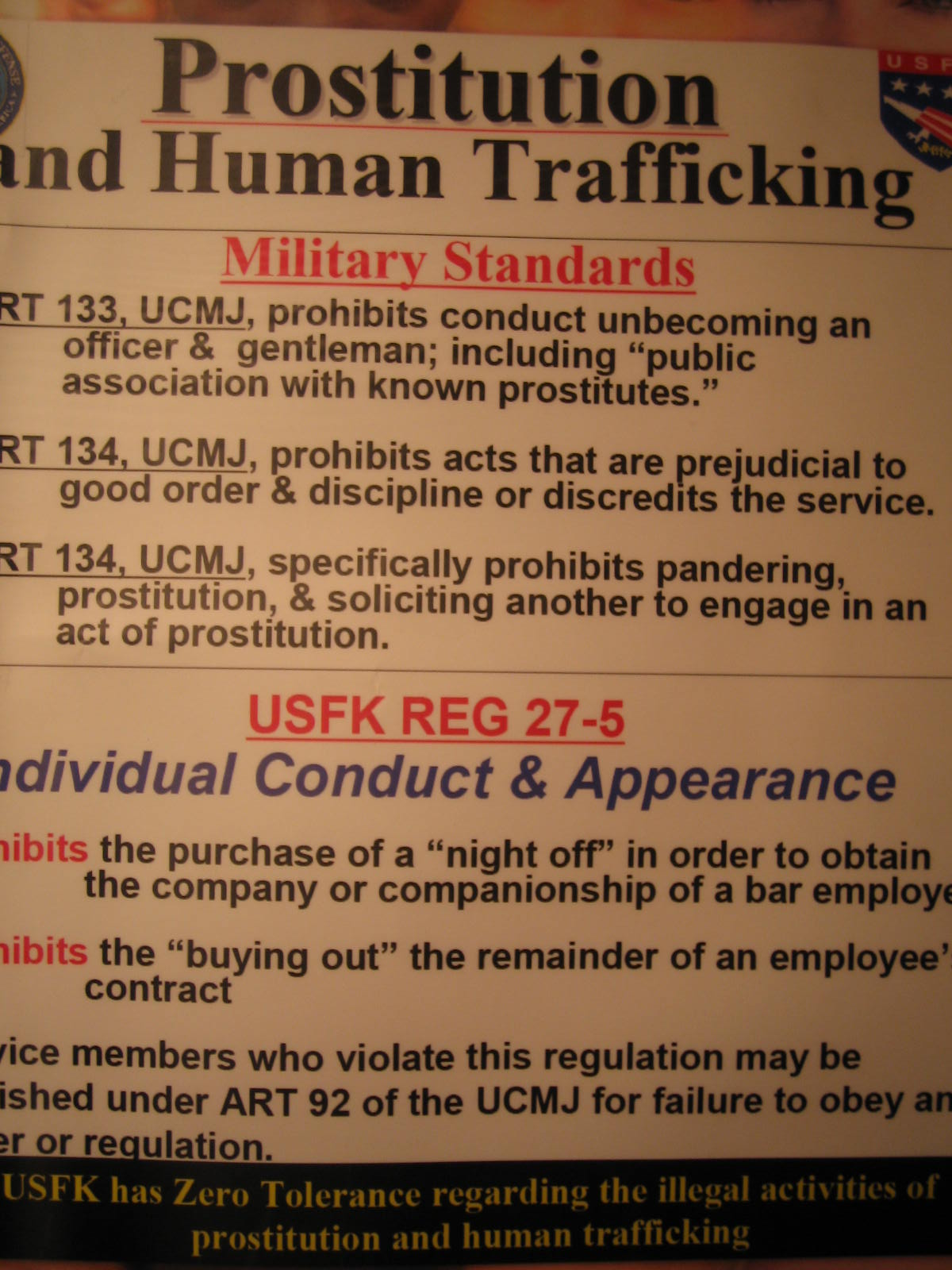
A United States Forces Korea poster, warning soldiers not to engage in prostitution or purchase a "bar fine", here referred to as a "night off"

A bargirl is a woman who is paid to entertain patrons in a bar or nightclub. A bar fine is a payment made by a customer to the operators of a bar or nightclub in East and Southeast Asia, allowing her to leave work early, typically to accompany a customer outside for sexual services. Female sex workers in low- and middle-income countries have high rates of harmful alcohol use, which is associated with increased risk of risky sexual behavior. Screening carried out in the 1990s in Malawi, an African country, indicated that about 80 per cent of bargirls carried the HIV virus. Research carried out at the time indicated that economic necessity was a major consideration in engaging and persisting in sex work.

A 2022 study found that bartenders experience high levels of hazardous alcohol and drug use, particularly among those working over 40 hours a week, with males and individuals aged 26–40 exhibiting the most problematic consumption, underscoring the need for targeted preventative interventions and further investigation into the underlying risk factors.

=== Socioeconomic standing ===
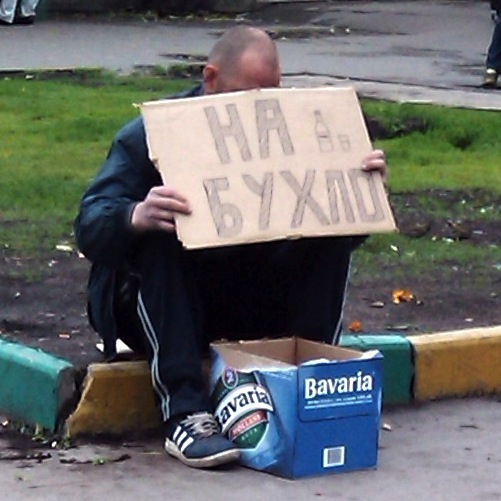
A man on the street of Moscow asks for money for alcoholic drinks.

Various studies show a relationship between higher rates of alcohol consumption with people who have lower socioeconomic standings. People with low socioeconomic standings are also more likely to experience health complications due to alcohol use than people with high socioeconomic standings. Alcohol consumption can contribute to secondary poverty (where people fall back into poverty after escaping it).

=== Unsustainable tourism ===
Some popular tourist destinations, are cracking down on the impacts of tourism from excessive drinking. In an effort to promote a more sustainable tourism industry, these locations are implementing new regulations to curb binge drinking. This includes Llucmajor, Palma, Calvia (Magaluf) in Majorca and Sant Antoni in Ibiza, where late-night sales of alcohol will be banned. This comes after years of issues with rowdy tourists and the negative impacts it has on local residents.

=== Alternative routes of administration ===
Alternative methods of alcohol administration like alcohol enema, alcohol inhalation, vodka eyeballing, or using alcohol powder (which can be added to water to make an alcoholic beverage, or inhaled with a nebulizer), all carry significant health risks.
