= Criticism of the alcohol industry =

The alcohol industry, also known as Big Alcohol, is the segment of the commercial drink industry that is involved in the manufacturing, distribution, and sale of alcoholic beverages. The industry has been criticised in the 1990s for deflecting attention away from the problems associated with alcohol use. The alcohol industry has also been criticised for being unhelpful in reducing the harm of alcohol.

The World Bank works with and invests in alcohol industry projects when positive effects with regard to public health concerns and social policy are demonstrated. Alcohol industry-sponsored education to reduce the harm of alcohol, actually results in an increase in the harm of alcohol. As a result, it has been recommended that the alcohol industry does not become involved in alcohol policy or educational programs.

In the United Kingdom, the New Labour government took the view that working with the alcohol industry to reduce harm was the most effective strategy. However, alcohol-related harms and alcohol use disorders have increased. The alcohol industry has been accused of exaggerating the health benefits of alcohol which is regarded as a potentially dangerous recreational drug with potentially serious adverse effects on health.

Since ethanol is classified as a Class I carcinogen, and there is no safe dose of alcohol; the alcohol industry is considered one of the main contributors to the formation of civilization or lifestyle diseases. The alcohol industry has tried to actively mislead the public about the risk of cancer due to alcohol consumption, in addition to campaigning to remove laws that require alcoholic beverages to have cancer warning labels.

A 2019 survey conducted by the American Institute for Cancer Research (AICR) showed that only 45% of Americans were aware of the associated risk of cancer due to alcohol consumption, up from 39% in 2017. The AICR believes that alcohol-related advertisements about the healthy cardiovascular benefits of modest alcohol overshadow messages about the increased cancer risks.

== Cancer ==
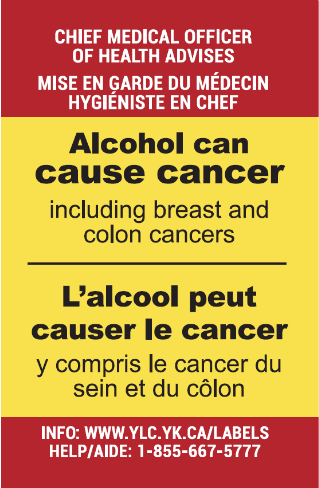
Alcohol warning label put on bottles in the Yukon, Canada (see Northern Territories Alcohol Labels Study)

Since ethanol is classified as a Class I carcinogen, and there is no safe dose of alcohol; the alcohol industry is considered one of the main contributors to the formation of civilization or lifestyle diseases. The alcohol industry has tried to actively mislead the public about the risk of cancer due to alcohol consumption, in addition to campaigning to remove laws that require alcoholic beverages to have cancer warning labels (cf. Northern Territories Alcohol Labels Study).

== Target marketing ==
=== Youth ===
The alcohol industry has tried to market its products to appeal to impressionable youth and young adults.

=== LGBTQ marketing ===
The alcohol industry has marketed products directly to the LGBTQ+ community. In 2010, of the sampled parades that listed sponsors, 61% of the prides were sponsored by the alcohol industry.

The LGBTQ+ community has historically suffered from higher levels of substance abuse than non-LGBTQ+ individuals. As of 2013, LGBTQ+ youth struggle with higher levels of alcohol usage than their non-LGBTQ+ peers, a pattern previously seen in 1998, 2003, and 2008 data.

=== Pinkwashing ===
Drinking alcoholic beverages increases the risk for breast cancer. Several studies indicate that the use of marketing by the alcohol industry to associate their products with breast cancer awareness campaigns, known as pinkwashing, is misleading and potentially harmful. Studies have found that this marketing strategy can increase perceptions of product healthfulness and social responsibility, leading to more favorable brand attitudes and reduced support for alcohol policies that could reduce consumption. However, there is evidence that informing the public about the contradictions and dangers of this practice can increase perceptions of misleadingness and support for measures like requiring alcohol-cancer warning labels. Overall, the research suggests that pinkwashed alcohol marketing exploits women's health concerns for commercial gain and undermines public health efforts to reduce alcohol-related harms.

== See also ==
- Alcoholic beverage industry in Europe
- Alcohol use disorder
- Alcohol advertising
- Alcohol education
- Alcohol and health
  - Short-term effects of alcohol consumption
  - Long-term effects of alcohol consumption
- Temperance movement
