= Der Alkoholismus =

1908 book by Anton Orel

Der Alkoholismus: Einführung in ein soziales Problem
- Author: Anton Orel
- Original title: Der Alkoholismus: Einführung in ein soziales Problem
- Language: German
- Genre: Human Health, Alcoholism
- Publisher: Reichsverbandssekretariat, Wien
- Publication date: 1908
- Publication place: Germany
- Media type: Print
- Pages: 116

Der Alkoholismus: Einführung in ein soziales Problem (English: The Alcoholism: Introduction to a Social Problem) is a 1908 book published by Austrian Catholic sociologist Anton Orel (1881-1959). Its goal was to reduce alcohol consumption and bring attention to the Alkoholfrage (English: the alcohol question). The book contains 25 sections that deal with different alcohol issues, ranging from the explanation of the alcohol question, to an elucidation of the alcohol's devastating health consequences and to the general economic impact of alcohol in the 20th century. Orel primarily aims to establish an abstinence movement against the existing drinking customs in order to save society from the devastating consequences. He frequently quotes experts' opinions on health and economic consequences in order to underline his statements. He particularly appeals to the youth as representing the basis for the planned revolutionary movement against the widespread alcoholism.

== Context ==
After studying law, Anton Orel became redactor of several magazines, among others Arbeiterjugend and Unserer Jugend. Famous for his anti-capitalistic views, Anton Orel founded the Bund der deutschen Arbeiterjugend in 1905, which was known as Verband der christlichen Jugend Österreichs from 1907 onwards. Orel values the possible impact youth can have on society; his book Der Alkoholismus: Einführung in ein soziales Problem (Alcoholism, introduction to a social problem) aims to impact the self-education and ability of the youthful generation to save society from its cultural ruin: "Ihr seid die Träger einer großen Zukunft die uns vom Kulturniedergang emporführen wird" (English: "You are the carriers of a great future that will bring us up from the cultural ruin").

Alcohol consumption represented a controversial societal issue, as shown by the growth of the movement against alcohol during the 19th century. The movement started in the United States, Canada and the United Kingdom. All anti-alcoholic organizations expressed hostility towards alcohol, even though their direct goals were different. Some, such as Anton Orel, fought for a voluntary abstinence, others for the moderation of drinking only. Overall, the health risks, as well as adverse social and national impact, of alcohol were emphasized. The greatest success by means of prohibition took place in the United States. Shortly after Anton Orel's publication, First World War (1914-1918) broke out, causing governments to introduce new and rigorous regulations that limited alcohol consumption. These regulations were largely maintained after the end of the war and were even intensified and extended throughout the Western world.

== Content ==
In total, the book consists of 25 sections. In each section, Orel describes a specific adverse consequence of alcohol consumption on either a personal or societal level, emphasizing the importance of an abstinence movement. Orel first presents the general alcohol problem that societies in the 20th century are faced with. Alcohol was strongly linked to daily life so it was necessary to inspect the linked social issues. Orel presents his plans of a movement against habitual alcohol consumption and the overall goal is the entire elimination of alcohol from daily life. The alcohol question asks how the total elimination of alcohol will be possible. He highlights that people's consumption cannot be excused as normal and rooted in human history, as in his view consumption has become more frequent and people are less resistant to the risks than many decades ago.

In the following sections, Orel emphasises the adverse health consequences. Due to the toxicity of alcohol, its impact on the body is devastating. Among others, alcohol has an adverse effect on the body's organs, metabolic system, immune system, nervous system and life expectancy. Additionally, most of the given adverse consequences are highly heritable causing a single alcoholic to have a negative impact on multiple generations. One possible impact is the inherited inability for women to breast-feed their children, causing child malnutrition in young age. Moreover, crimes are commonly committed by alcoholics.

Trying to investigate factors that facilitate society's alcoholism, Orel highlights that the production and sale of alcohol is especially profitable and that greed is a main factor increasing the prevalence of alcoholism. He portrays the paradoxical relationship of the consequences of alcohol consumption and the destruction of tons of foods in the process of producing alcohol.<

In order to fight alcoholism, Orel says it is indispensable to fight existing drinking customs such as Kein Leben ohne Freude, keine Freude ohne Alkohol (English: "There is no life without happiness, no happiness without alcohol") and people's negative conception of an abstinent person. He also discusses the importance of empowering youth as they are able to have an actual impact on existing customs. Orel proposes to start the abstinence movement by creating abstinent subgroups within existing associations to create a widespread basis for the movement. He concludes that it will overall take a long time to create an alcohol free society and the most important sub-goal to reach is to create a strong anti-alcohol movement in schools and reach a general alcohol ban for children and youth.

== Reception ==
The book was praised for the density of information provided. The Christliche Arbeiterzeitung valued that the book provided an overview of the alcohol problem and outlines the impact of alcohol on society. The Reichspost praised the empirical background of the book combined with its easy-written overall character. Anton Orel was able to separate himself from the pressure of society and criticize the societal habit of alcohol consumption, aiming to entirely ban alcohol consumption. However, caused by its rigor, Orel's publications are seen as utopic and he is criticised for his intransigence. Receptions such as "Es ist schade, dass das sonst tüchtige Werkchen mit solch Übertreibungen beschwert ist (…)." (English: "It is a pity that the otherwise efficient little work is burdened with such exaggerations (…).") confirm this extreme tendency.

Several of Orel's suggestions and warnings are confirmed and still important in the 21st century. Strikingly, the proposed adverse health effects were quite accurate. One possible health consequence already introduced by Orel in 1908 and confirmed by research, is alcohol's depressing effects on the central nervous system (CNS) which can range from mild euphoria to a condition of coma and death. Another health consequence impacting society today is altered immune regulation leading to immunodeficiency and autoimmunity, causing lower resistance to bacterial diseases. Another example of this is Orel's proposed destructive impact of alcohol consumption on life expectancy. This is now supported in research showing that excessive alcohol consumption is associated with increased mortality. Even though Anton Orel's work highlights issues in the early 20th century, alcoholism still appears to be a major social problem in the 21st century.

== See also ==
- Temperance movement
