= Occupational cardiovascular disease =

- Specialty: Cardiology

Occupational cardiovascular diseases (CVD) are diseases of the heart or blood vessels caused by working conditions, making them a form of occupational illness. These diseases include coronary heart disease, stroke, cardiomyopathy, arrhythmia, and heart valve or heart chamber problems. Cardiovascular disease is the leading cause of death in the United States and worldwide. In the United States, cardiovascular diseases account for one out of four deaths. The 6th International Conference on Work Environment and Cardiovascular Diseases found that within the working age population about 10-20% of cardiovascular disease deaths can be attributed to work. Ten workplace stressors and risk factors (shift work, long work hours, low job control, low job security, high job demand, work-family imbalance, low work social support, low organizational justice, unemployment, and no health insurance) were estimated to be associated with 120,000 U.S. deaths each year and account for 5-8% of health care costs.

Research related to the association between work and cardiovascular disease is on-going. Links have been established between cardiovascular disease risk and occupational exposure to chemicals, noise, psychosocial stressors, physical activity, and certain workplace organization factors. Additionally, work-related risk factors for cardiovascular disease may also increase the risk of other cardiovascular disease risk factors such as hypertension, diabetes, obesity, unhealthy diet, leisure-time physical inactivity, and excessive alcohol use. Work may also increase risk of depression, burnout, sleeping problems, and physiological and cardiorespiratory stress mechanisms in the body which may also affect the risk for cardiovascular disease.

== United States trends in cardiovascular disease and the impact of work ==
Age-adjusted cardiovascular disease death rates in the U.S. are no longer declining, as they previously had been since the 1960s. Cardiovascular disease death rates are increasing in older (45–64 years) working-age people. In fact, death rates from all causes have been increasing since about 2012 in working-age people (25–64 years), primarily due to increases in drug (mainly opioid) overdoses, alcohol abuse, suicides, and chronic diseases, such as cardiovascular diseases, hypertension and diabetes. Between 2000-2015, the cardiovascular disease mortality gap between the U.S. and other wealthy countries has widened. These trends are occurring despite improvements in the medical treatment of cardiovascular diseases. Primary prevention of cardiovascular diseases, including workplace health promotion, is key to reducing death rates.

Related explanations for cardiovascular disease trends are increases in the prevalence of other stress-related (including work-related stress) conditions, obesity, diabetes, metabolic syndrome, and short sleeping hours. The age-adjusted prevalence of hypertension increased in the U.S. between 1988-2010 and increased again between 2010-2018 for most gender-race groups. Mental health disorders, including depression and anxiety, are increasing globally and in the U.S.

A 2021 National Academy of Sciences report points out that "social, economic, and cultural changes that have undermined economic security, intergenerational mobility, and social support networks can adversely affect cardiometabolic health through stress-mediated biological pathways and reduced access to care".

Recent research indicates working conditions that may be contributing to the cardiovascular disease trends in the U.S. include,

- increases in
  - annual working hours
  - job stressors, such as low job control, job strain, and work-family conflict
  - income inequality
  - precarious employment (such as temporary or contract work) that involves inadequate pay, job insecurity, changes in working-time arrangements, loss of workers' rights and protections, lack of collective organization (such as unionization)
- decreases in
  - union membership
  - social mobility (movement of people upward or downward in society through job status, education level, income, etc.)
  - work intensification through new technology and "lean production" techniques

== Work-related risk factors for cardiovascular disease ==
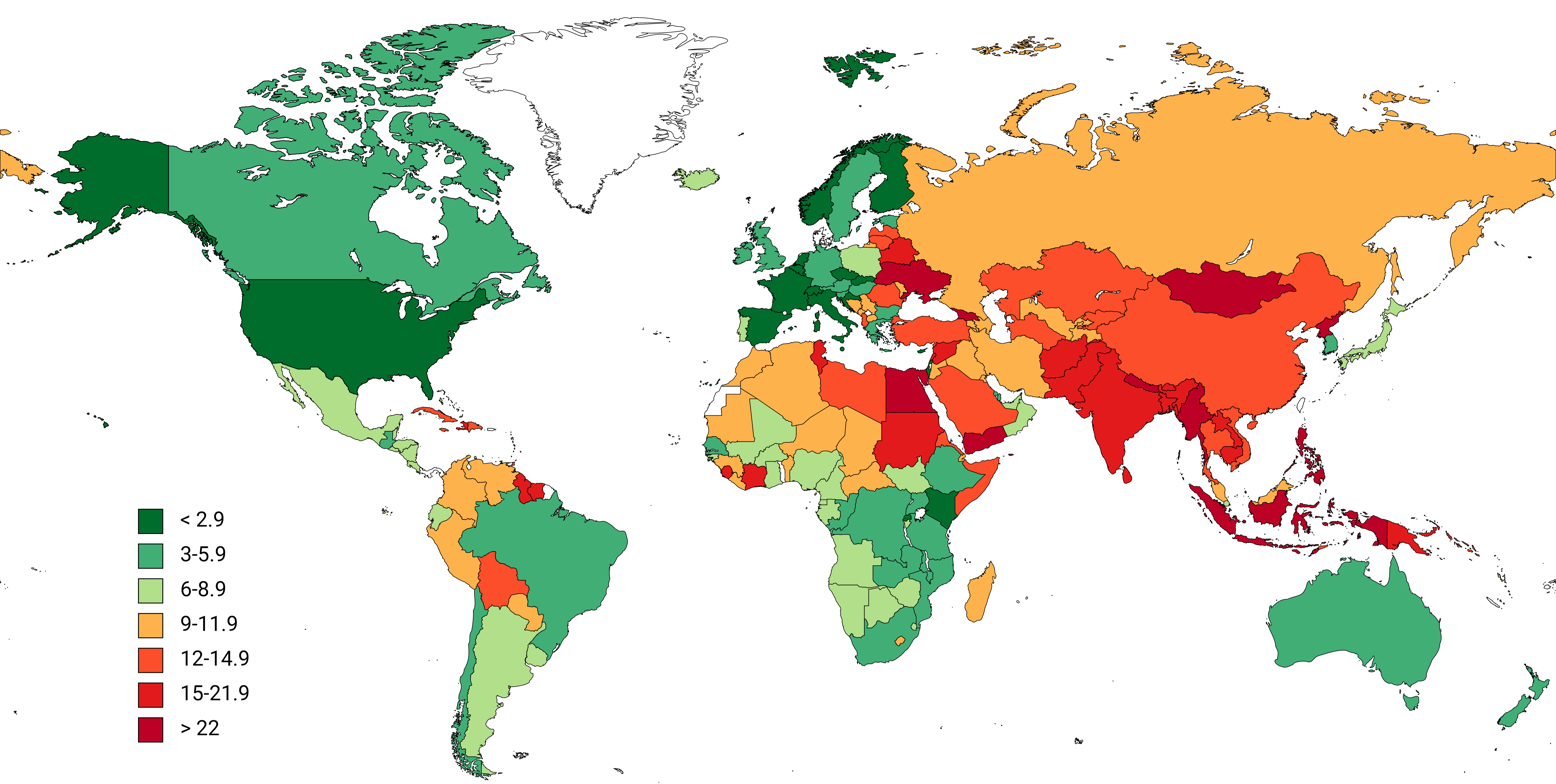
Deaths due to long working hours per 100,000 people (15+), joint study conducted by World Health Organization and International Labour Organization in 2016.

- Psychosocial work stressors
  - High job demands combined with low control (known as job strain)
  - High work efforts combined with low work rewards (known as effort-reward imbalance)
  - Bullying and violence
  - Low social support at work
  - Lack of opportunities for personal development
  - Job insecurity
- Frequent stimulation of the sympathetic nervous system
- Non-standard shift work (such as night or rotating shifts)
- Long work hours (55 or more hours per week)
- Occupational exposure to loud noise
- Occupational exposure to ionizing radiation

Hypertension develops more often in those who experience job strain and who have shift-work. Differences between women and men in risk are small, however men risk having and dying of heart attacks or stroke twice as often as women during working life.

- Occupational exposure to chemicals

Chemicals are used in many workplaces. Workers can be exposed to chemicals by breathing them in, eating or drinking contaminated food and drinks, or absorbing them through the skin.

A 2017 Swedish government report found evidence that workplace exposure to silica dust, engine exhaust or welding fumes is associated with heart disease. Associations also exist for exposure to arsenic, benzopyrenes, lead, dynamite, carbon disulphide, carbon monoxide, metalworking fluids and occupational exposure to tobacco smoke. Working with the electrolytic production of aluminum or the production of paper when the sulphate pulping process is used is associated with heart disease. An association was also found between heart disease and exposure to compounds which are no longer permitted in certain work environments, such as phenoxy acids containing TCDD (dioxin) or asbestos.

Workplace exposure to silica dust or asbestos is also associated with pulmonary heart disease. There is evidence that workplace exposure to lead, carbon disulphide, phenoxy acids containing TCDD, as well as working in an environment where aluminum is being electrolytically produced, is associated with stroke.

According to a 2021 WHO study, working 55+ hours a week raises the risk of stroke by 35% and the risk of dying from heart conditions by 17%, when compared to a 35-40 hours week.

== Occupations at higher risk for cardiovascular disease ==
- First responders, including firefighters and police officers
- NFL Players
- Professional drivers, including long-haul truck drivers
- Food and drink preparatory workers
- Fishery workers
- Cargo workers
- Civil engineer workers
- Plant and machine operators and assemblers

=== Occupational cardiovascular disease in firefighters ===
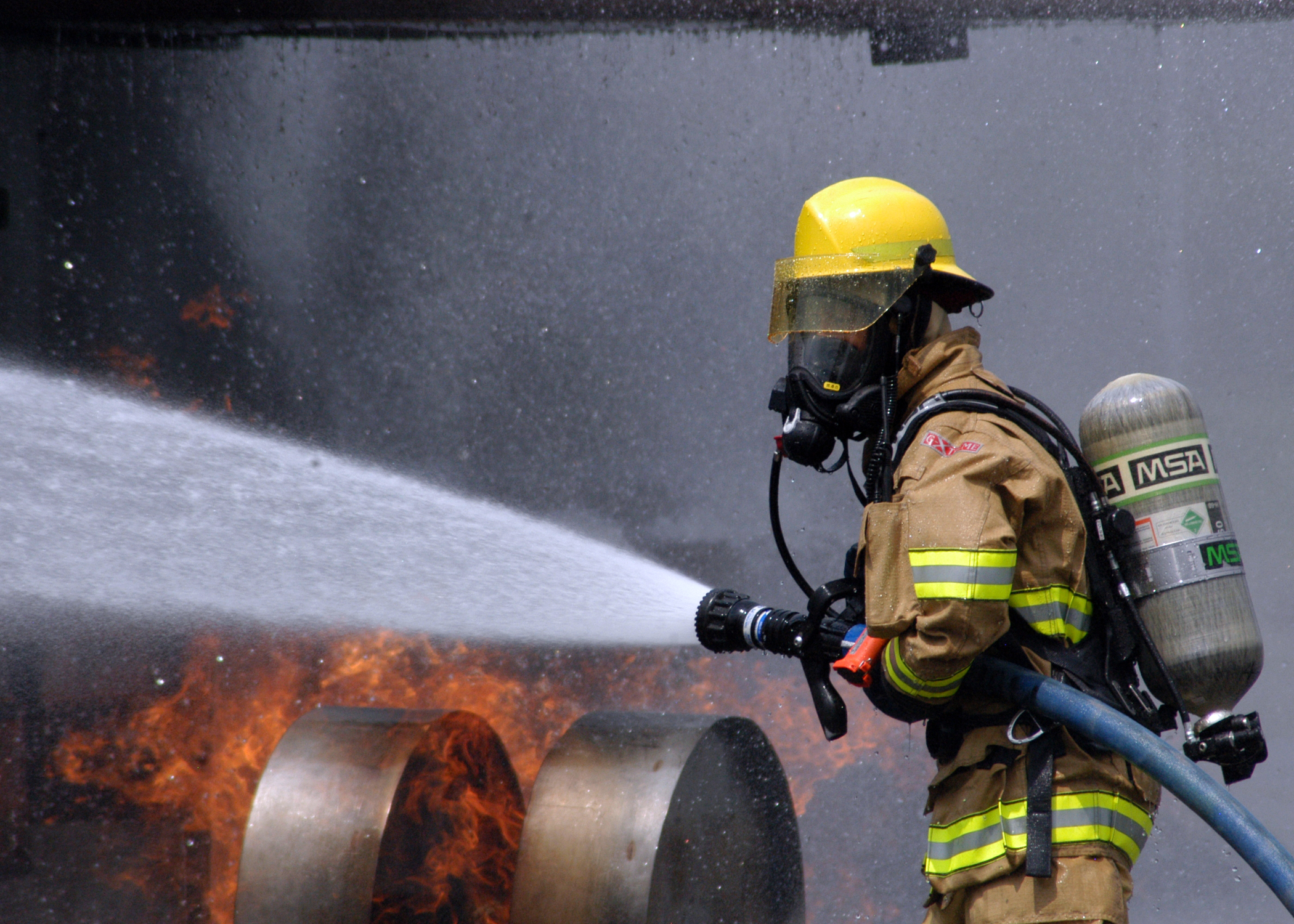
Firefighter using a hose to combat a fire

Given the many hazards present during career firefighting, firefighters are at a greater risk for occupational cardiovascular disease. CVD is the leading cause of death in firefighters, and accounts for 45% of on-duty deaths. About 90% of CVD in firefighters is attributed to coronary heart disease. Other researchers have found that blood plasma volume decreases after just minutes of firefighting which increases blood pressure and causes the heart to work harder to distribute blood systemically. Firefighting has also shown to increase arterial stiffness and overall cardiovascular strain. In a study by Barger, et al., a positive screening for a sleep disorder increased the odds a firefighter would also have cardiovascular disease (OR = 2.37, 95% CI 1.54-3.66, p < 0.0001).

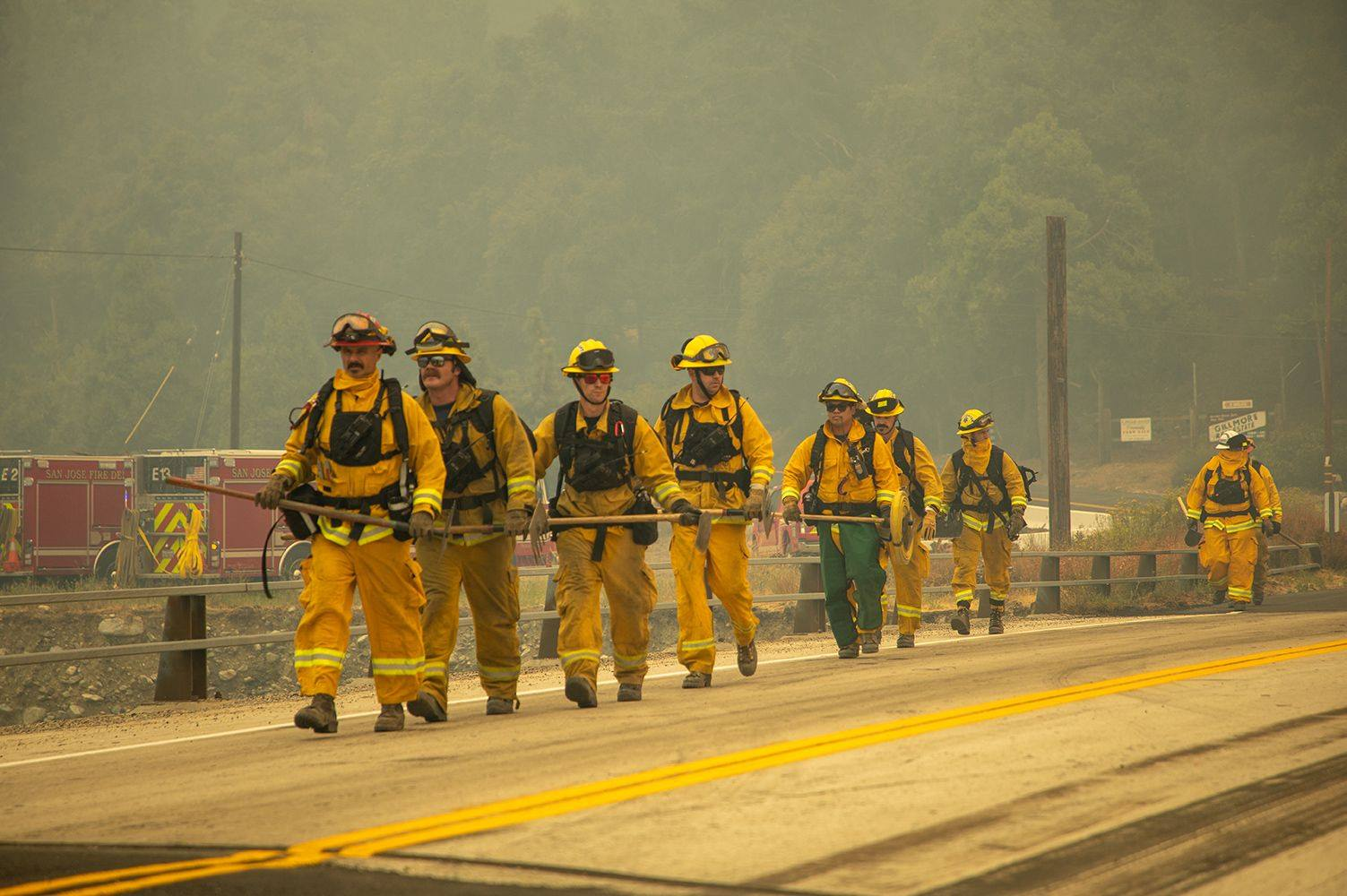
Group of firefighters in gear carrying a long hose to the fire scene.

==== CVD risk factors in firefighting ====
- Sleep disorders and partial sleep deprivation
- Shiftwork and frequently disrupted sleep
- Dehydration
- Heat stress from environmental, metabolic work, and heavy PPE
- Physical workload - Long sedentary periods followed by strenuous physical workload
- Sympathetic activation ("fight or flight response") due to noise, low visibility work conditions, and danger
- Inadequate leisure time physical activity
- Unhealthy eating habits
- Smoke exposure - gases and ultrafine particulates
- Occupational stress due to stressful or traumatic experiences

== Prevention of occupational cardiovascular disease ==
=== Primary Prevention ===
Common programs to reduce CVD risk have been worksite-based health promotion, wellness, or stress management. However, rigorous research has suggested small effects of such programs. Organizational and workplace interventions have been effective in reducing sources of stress at work. Other strategies for reducing work stressors include legislative and regulatory-level interventions with examples including laws providing for better nurse-patient staffing ratios, bans on mandatory overtime, paid sick days, paid family leave or retail worker schedule predictability (see case studies on-line, Healthy Work Campaign, 2021). However, such legislative interventions are rarely evaluated and thus are typically not included in review articles.

The 7th International Conference on Work Environment and Cardiovascular Diseases emphasized the need to bridge the gap between knowledge and preventive interventions at the workplace, to reduce cardiovascular diseases, through effective collaboration between health operators involved in prevention of CVD. The NIOSH Total Worker Health Program conveys the innovative concept that only holistic interventions at the workplace which reduce both work-related and life-style risk factors, may be effective to prevent CVDs. As examples, the interactions between job strain and sedentarism at work as well as the findings that the relations of job strain and CVD incidence is more pronounced among salaried workers (white and blue collars) are crucial in the perspectives to convey "the right preventive interventions to the right people".

Unfortunately, no organizational intervention studies have been carried out to prevent CVD at work, and few to prevent CVD risk factors, such as hypertension. The following are three examples of organizational interventions to reduce blood pressure, which provided some evidence of their effectiveness:

- A small Swedish study found that systolic blood pressure increased among workers on a traditional auto assembly line but did not increase during a work shift among auto assembly workers in a flexible team-based work organization.
- Another small Swedish study looked at the impact of a set of interventions in Stockholm, including separate bus lanes; a bus priority traffic signal system; passenger peninsulas; reducing illegally parked cars; and electronic information systems for passengers. The intervention was effective in reducing self-reported workload, job hassles, systolic blood pressure, heart rate and distress after work among bus drivers. However, no significant change was seen for diastolic blood pressure, fatigue, or psychosomatic symptoms.
- A program among white-collar workers at a Quebec insurance services agency included surveys, focus groups, and meetings at work to "diagnose" problems and suggest changes in policies and procedures. Managers made decisions about changes, specific to each department over 17–24 months. There were joint union-management committees in four of nine intervention departments. Examples of changes to policies and procedures were: regular employee/manager meetings on routine matters; group meetings with managers; organizational restructuring to reduce workload; slowing down changes in work processes and computer software to allow for better adaptation; more flexible work hours; and career and skills development. Follow-up at 30-months showed lower psychological distress, and lower job demands, and higher co-worker support and respect/esteem, although no change in low job control, supervisor support or reward, in the intervention group compared to the control group. blood pressure and hypertension significantly decreased in the intervention group with no change in the control group.

== See also ==
- Occupational hazard
- Chemical hazard
- Psychosocial hazard
