= Alcohol and cardiovascular disease =

Effects of alcohol consumption on cardiovascular health

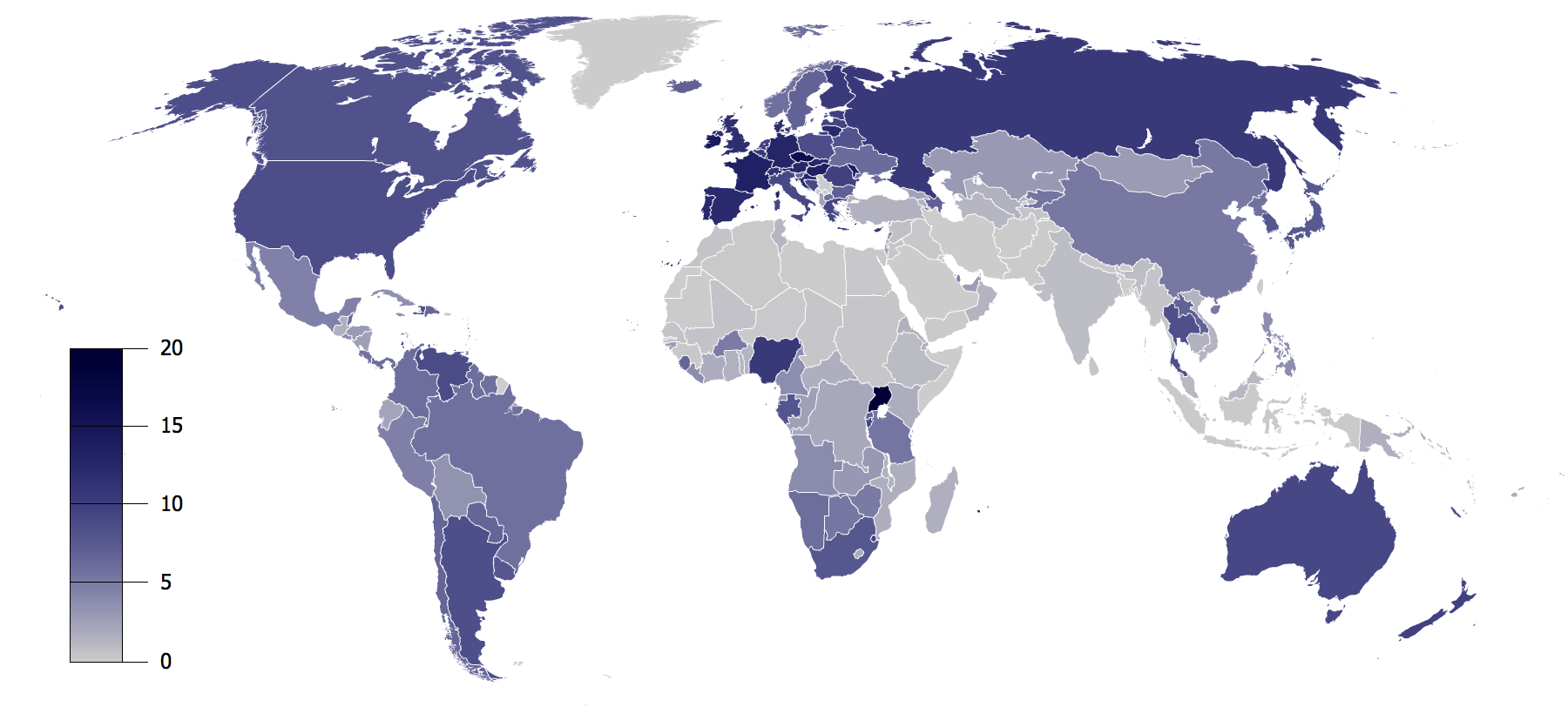
Total recorded alcohol per capita consumption, in litres of pure alcohol

In a 2018 study on 599,912 drinkers, a roughly linear association was found with alcohol consumption and a higher risk of stroke, coronary artery disease excluding myocardial infarction, heart failure, fatal hypertensive disease, and fatal aortic aneurysm, even for moderate drinkers. Alcohol abuse may also cause occupational cardiovascular disease. The American Heart Association states that people who are currently non-drinkers should not start drinking alcohol.

Excessive alcohol intake is associated with an elevated risk of alcoholic liver disease (ALD), heart failure, some cancers, and accidental injury, and is a leading cause of preventable death in industrialized countries. Some studies have suggested that one drink per day may have cardiovascular benefits. However, these studies are controversial, and the common view is that no level of alcohol consumption improves health. There is far more evidence for the harmful effects of alcohol than for any beneficial effects. It is also recognized that the alcohol industry may promote the unsubstantiated benefits of moderate drinking.

== Alcohol intake and cardiovascular disease ==
Some early reviews showed that light alcohol consumption may have a protective effect on cardiovascular health. For instance, a meta-analysis from 2010 found that patients with cardiovascular disease who were light to moderate alcohol consumers, were less likely to suffer from cardiovascular and all-cause mortality. However, the researchers warned against encouraging cardiovascular patients who do not regularly consume alcohol to start drinking due to lack of controlled intervention studies and evidence.

Several possible mechanisms have been suggested for the cardioprotective effect of alcohol. These include glucose control, lipid metabolism, and metabolism as a whole. However, another possible explanation is that the cardioprotective effect is only a confounding research result. A logical possibility is that some of the alcohol abstainers in research studies previously drank excessively and had undermined their health. After they quit they were categorized as non-drinkers, which in turn led to more sick people in the non-drinkers category. To test this hypothesis, a 2019 meta analysis has recategorized people accordingly. As a result, no benefit was found for alcohol consumption of any dosage, moreover, alcohol was detrimental to health even at low doses.

The American Heart Association states that drinking too much alcohol increases health risks including cardiovascular disease precursors such as obesity, high blood pressure, high triglycerides and also heart attacks and strokes. They warn that "We’ve all seen the headlines about studies associating light or moderate drinking with health benefits and reduced mortality. Some researchers have suggested there are health benefits from wine, especially red wine, and that a glass a day can be good for the heart. But there’s more to the story. No research has proved a cause-and-effect link between drinking alcohol and better heart health."

The World Heart Federation (2022) recommends against any alcohol intake for optimal heart health.

It has also been pointed out that the studies suggesting a positive link between red wine consumption and heart health had flawed methodology in the form of comparing two sets of people which were not actually appropriately paired.

Alcohol-related cardiovascular disease has recently (2026 European Hear Journal) been reconceptualized as a complex systemic disorder involving extensive interorgan crosstalk, extending beyond the traditional paradigm of direct myocardial and vascular toxicity. Based on an integrated assessment of clinical, epidemiological, and experimental evidence, alcohol-induced disturbances in communication between the heart and multiple organs, including the liver, gut, kidneys, lungs, brain, and immune system, have been implicated in the development and progression of cardiovascular injury.

The importance of alcohol exposure patterns has also been increasingly recognized, as distinct but overlapping cardiovascular consequences are associated with acute or binge drinking, sustained heavy consumption, chronic drinking with episodic binges, and alcohol withdrawal. Acute exposure may precipitate arrhythmias, autonomic instability, and hemodynamic disturbances, whereas sustained heavy consumption is associated with hypertension, myocardial dysfunction, vascular injury, and progressive structural remodeling. Cardiovascular damage may be further amplified when acute binge episodes are superimposed on chronic alcohol-induced injury, while withdrawal may trigger sympathetic overactivation, electrolyte disturbances, and potentially life-threatening arrhythmias. Consequently, cardiovascular risk is determined not only by the total amount of alcohol consumed but also by exposure patterns, duration, and individual susceptibility.

Increasing attention has also been directed toward the contributions of microvascular dysfunction, mitochondrial injury, oxidative and nitrative stress, inflammation, and cellular senescence to alcohol-related cardiovascular pathology. Cumulative alcohol exposure has been proposed to accelerate cardiovascular ageing through interconnected molecular and cellular mechanisms, progressively compromising myocardial, vascular, electrical, autonomic, and functional reserve.

At the same time, the longstanding concept of cardiovascular protection associated with light-to-moderate drinking has been increasingly challenged by contemporary epidemiological and genetic evidence. Ageing, biological sex, genetic susceptibility, and comorbidities have also been recognized as important modifiers of alcohol-related cardiovascular risk.

Collectively, these advances support an emerging systems-cardiology framework in which direct alcohol toxicity, multiorgan dysfunction, molecular injury, microvascular impairment, and accelerated cardiovascular ageing are interconnected contributors to cardiovascular disease, providing a foundation for future mechanistic investigations, improved risk stratification, and targeted translational interventions.

== Alcohol reduction ==
It is well known that alcohol consumption increases the risk of hypertension. Hence, many clinical trials have examined the effect of reduction in alcohol consumption on blood pressure. Systematic review and meta-analysis have shown that the effect of alcohol reduction on blood pressure is dose dependent.

I. For people who consumed 2 or fewer drinks per day, blood pressure was not significantly decreased when they reduced alcohol consumption close to abstinence.
II. For people who consumed 3 or more drinks per day, blood pressure was significantly decreased when they reduced alcohol consumption close to abstinence.
III. For people who consumed 6 or more drinks per day, reduction rate on blood pressure was the strongest when they reduced alcohol consumption close to abstinence.
IV. The effect of alcohol reduction on blood pressure is still unclear for women and hypertensive patients who consume less than three drinks per day due to limited clinical trials.

== History ==
In 2010, a systematic review reported that moderate consumption of alcohol does not cause harm to people with cardiovascular disease. However, the authors did not encourage people to start drinking alcohol in the hope of any benefit.

== See ==
- French paradox
- Long-term effects of alcohol consumption
