= Health effects of alcohol =

Alcohol (also known as ethanol) has a number of effects on health. Short-term effects of alcohol consumption include intoxication and dehydration. Long-term effects of alcohol include changes in the metabolism of the liver and brain, with increased risk of several types of cancer and alcohol use disorder. Alcohol intoxication affects the brain, causing slurred speech, clumsiness, and delayed reflexes. There is an increased risk of developing an alcohol use disorder for teenagers while their brain is still developing. Adolescents who drink have a higher probability of injury including death.

Light alcohol consumption was misclassified as possibly healthy in the past by several studies, but evidence shows that even minimal to light alcohol consumption can have negative effects on health, such as by increasing a person's risk of developing several cancers. A 2014 World Health Organization (WHO) report found that harmful alcohol consumption caused about 3.3 million deaths annually worldwide. Negative effects are related to the amount consumed with no safe lower limit seen. Some nations have introduced alcohol packaging warning messages that inform consumers about alcohol and cancer, as well as fetal alcohol syndrome. In modern medicine, the only possible beneficial uses of alcohol are as a topical disinfectant, temporary emergency cure for alcohol withdrawal syndrome, and, as long as kept in strict moderation, positive social effects outweighing harm to the body. Practically no authorities recommend starting drinking for any positive effects.

In January 2025, the surgeon general of the United States released an advisory describing a causal relationship between alcohol consumption and increased risk of seven different types of cancer, including colorectal cancer, liver cancer, and throat cancer. The advisory recommended updating the health warning label on alcohol-containing beverages in the United States to include a warning about the risk of cancer from consuming these beverages.

== Short-term effects ==
The short-term effects of alcohol consumption range from a decrease in anxiety and motor skills at lower doses to unconsciousness, anterograde amnesia, and central nervous system depression at higher doses. Cell membranes are highly permeable to alcohol, so once alcohol is in the bloodstream it can diffuse into nearly every cell in the body.

The concentration of alcohol in blood is measured via blood alcohol content (BAC). The amount and circumstances of consumption play a large part in determining the extent of intoxication; for example, eating a heavy meal before alcohol consumption causes alcohol to absorb more slowly. Hydration also plays a role, especially in determining the extent of hangovers. After binge drinking, unconsciousness can occur and extreme levels of consumption can lead to alcohol poisoning and death (a concentration in the blood stream of 0.40% will kill half of those affected). Alcohol may also cause death indirectly, by asphyxiation from vomit.

Alcohol disrupts normal sleep patterns thereby reducing sleep quality and can greatly exacerbate sleep problems. During abstinence, residual disruptions in sleep regularity and sleep patterns are the greatest predictors of relapse.

Heavy alcohol consumption while in a hunger state can cause alcoholic ketoacidosis, a life-threatening metabolic derailment.

The median lethal dose of alcohol in test animals is a blood alcohol content of 0.45%. This is about six times the level of ordinary intoxication (0.08%), but vomiting or unconsciousness may occur much sooner in people who have a low tolerance for alcohol. The high tolerance of chronic heavy drinkers may allow some of them to remain conscious at levels above 0.40%, although serious health hazards are incurred at this level.

Alcohol also limits the production of vasopressin (antidiuretic hormone) from the hypothalamus and the secretion of this hormone from the posterior pituitary gland. This is what causes severe dehydration when alcohol is consumed in large amounts. It also causes a high concentration of water in the urine and vomit, and the intense thirst that goes along with a hangover.

== Long-term effects ==
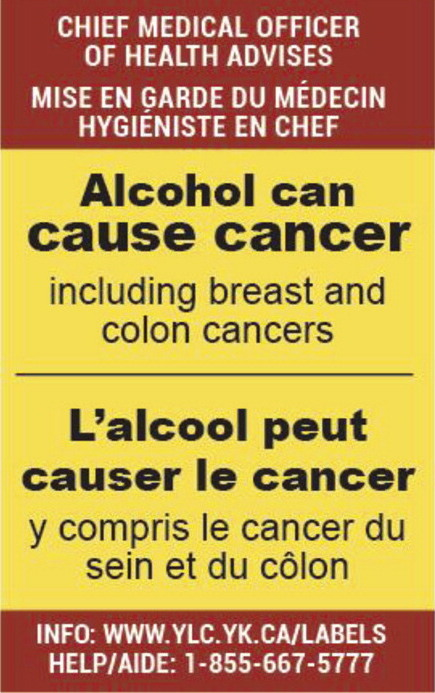
Example of an alcohol packaging warning message from Canada.

According to the World Health Organization's 2018 Global Status Report on Alcohol and Health, there are more than 3 million people who die from the harmful effects of alcohol each year, which amounts to more than 5% of the burden of disease worldwide. The US National Institutes of Health similarly estimates that 3.3 million deaths (5.9% of all deaths) were believed to be due to alcohol each year.

As per WHO June 2024 report on Alcohol, around 2.6 million deaths were caused by alcohol consumption in 2019 worldwide.

Guidelines in the US and the UK advise that if people choose to drink, they should drink modestly.

Even light and moderate alcohol consumption increases a person's cancer risk, especially the risk of developing squamous cell carcinoma of the esophagus, cancers of the mouth and tongue, liver cancer, and breast cancer. Using alcohol, especially together with tobacco, is a major risk factor for head and neck cancer. 72% of head and neck cancer cases are caused by using both alcohol and tobacco. This rises to 89% when looking specifically at laryngeal cancer.

Health risks of alcohol consumption

A systematic analysis of data from the Global Burden of Disease Study, which was an observational study, found that long-term consumption of any amount of alcohol is associated with an increased risk of death in all people, and that even moderate consumption appears to be risky. Similar to prior analyses, it found an apparent benefit for older women in reducing the risks of death from ischemic heart disease and from diabetes mellitus, but unlike prior studies it found those risks cancelled by an apparent increased risk of death from breast cancer and other causes. A 2016 systematic review and meta-analysis found that moderate ethanol consumption brought no mortality benefit compared with lifetime abstention from ethanol consumption. Risk is greater in younger people due to heavy episodic drinking which may result in violence or accidents.

Long-term heavy use of alcohol damages nearly every organ and system in the body. Risks include alcohol use disorder, malnutrition, chronic pancreatitis, alcoholic liver disease (e.g., permanent liver scarring) and several types of cancer. In addition, damage to the central nervous system and peripheral nervous system (e.g., painful peripheral neuropathy) can occur from chronic alcohol misuse.

The developing adolescent brain is particularly vulnerable to the toxic effects of alcohol.

A systematic analysis found in 2022 that the level of alcohol consumption recommended by many existing guidelines is too high in particular for young people in all regions.

=== DNA damage ===
Acetaldehyde is produced when cells process ethanol. Acetaldehyde, is a DNA damaging metabolite that can interact with DNA to crosslink the two strands of the DNA duplex. The mechanisms the cells use for repairing these crosslinks are error prone, thus leading to mutations that in the long term can cause cancer.

== Pregnancy and breastfeeding ==
Medical organizations strongly discourage drinking alcohol during pregnancy. Alcohol passes easily from the mother's bloodstream through the placenta and into the bloodstream of the fetus, which interferes with brain and organ development. Alcohol can affect the fetus at any stage during pregnancy, but the level of risk depends on the amount and frequency of alcohol consumed. Regular heavy drinking and heavy episodic drinking (also called binge drinking), entailing four or more standard alcoholic drinks (a pint of beer or 50 ml drink of a spirit such as whisky corresponds to about two units of alcohol) on any one occasion, pose the greatest risk for harm, but lesser amounts can cause problems as well. There is no known safe amount or safe time to drink during pregnancy, and the U.S. Centers for Disease Control and Prevention recommends complete abstinence for women who are pregnant, trying to become pregnant, or are sexually active and not using birth control.

Prenatal alcohol exposure can lead to fetal alcohol spectrum disorders (FASDs). The most severe form of FASD is fetal alcohol syndrome (FAS). Problems associated with FASD include abnormal facial development, low birth weight, stunted growth, small head size, delayed or uncoordinated motor skills, hearing or vision problems, learning disabilities, behavior problems, and inappropriate social skills compared to same-age peers. Those affected are more likely to have trouble in school, legal problems, participate in high-risk behaviors, and develop substance use disorders like excessive drinking themselves.

The UK National Health Service states that "an occasional drink is unlikely to harm" a breastfed baby, and recommends consumption of "no more than one or two units of alcohol once or twice a week" for breastfeeding mothers (where a pint of beer or 50 ml drink of a spirit such as whisky corresponds to about two units of alcohol). The NHS also recommends to wait for a couple of hours before breastfeeding or express the milk into a bottle before drinking. Researchers have shown that intoxicated breastfeeding reduces the average milk expression but poses no immediate threat to the child as the amount of transferred alcohol is insignificant.

== Cardiovascular disease ==
In 2010, a systematic review reported that moderate consumption of alcohol does not cause harm to people with cardiovascular disease. However, the authors did not encourage people to start drinking alcohol in the hope of any benefit. In a 2018 study on 599,912 drinkers, a roughly linear association was found with alcohol consumption and a higher risk of stroke, coronary artery disease excluding myocardial infarction, heart failure, fatal hypertensive disease, and fatal aortic aneurysm, even for moderate drinkers. The American Heart Association states that people who are currently non-drinkers should not start drinking alcohol.

== Insulin response ==
Alcohol is known to potentiate the insulin response of the human body to glucose, which, in essence, "instructs" the body to convert consumed carbohydrates into fat and to suppress carbohydrate and fat oxidation. Ethanol is directly processed in the liver to acetyl CoA, the same intermediate product as in glucose metabolism. Because ethanol is mostly metabolized and consumed by the liver, chronic excessive use can lead to fatty liver. This leads to a chronic inflammation of the liver and eventually alcoholic liver disease.

Alcohol consumption can cause hypoglycemia in diabetics on certain medications, such as insulin or sulfonylurea, by blocking gluconeogenesis.

Alcoholic beverages show a lower satiety value per calorie.

== Mental health ==
Alcohol misuse often coincides with mental health conditions. Many individuals struggling with psychiatric disorders also experience problematic drinking behaviors.

== Alcohol education ==
Amid the medical world's reappraisal of alcohol's health effects, the proportion of Americans who believe even moderate alcohol consumption—one or two drinks per day—is bad for one's health has doubled. Concurrently, the number of people who report drinking alcohol has declined.

Alcohol education is the practice of disseminating information about the effects of alcohol on health, as well as society and the family unit. It was introduced into the public schools by temperance organizations such as the Woman's Christian Temperance Union in the late 19th century. Initially, alcohol education focused on how the consumption of alcoholic beverages affected society, as well as the family unit. In the 1930s, this came to also incorporate education pertaining to alcohol's effects on health. Organizations such as the National Institute on Alcohol Abuse and Alcoholism in the United States were founded to promulgate alcohol education alongside those of the temperance movement, such as the American Council on Alcohol Problems.

== Alcohol expectations ==
Alcohol expectations are beliefs and attitudes that people have about the effects they will experience when drinking alcoholic beverages. Alcohol expectancy theory posits that drinking behaviors are driven by these expectations, and the individual may be motivated to drink to obtain desired alcohol effects or, alternatively, motivated to refrain from drinking due to the expectation of undesirable effects. Intoxication does have real physiological effects, such as altering a drinker's perception of space and time, reducing psychomotor skills, and disrupting equilibrium. But some effects and the degree of the effects that are attributed to alcohol can be due to the expectations rather than the substance itself, similar to the placebo effect.

For example, in a laboratory study, men acted more aggressive when they believed their drink contained alcohol, even when it was plain tonic water. They also were less aggressive when they believed they were consuming a non-alcoholic drink, even if it contained alcohol. This shows that aggression is a result of expectations. The study has been replicated. Another study found that those who believed that intoxication leads to sexual behavior, rowdy behavior, and aggression tended to act that way when intoxicated. But similarly the belief that intoxication leads to relaxation and tranquil behavior was self-fulfilling. As a third example, some societies expect that drinking alcohol will cause disinhibition. However, in societies in which the people do not expect that alcohol will disinhibit, intoxication seldom leads to disinhibition and bad behavior.

Common positive alcohol outcome expectancies include tension reduction, heightened sociability, increased courage, and enhanced sexual experiences, whereas common negative alcohol outcome expectancies include cognitive and behavioral impairment, risk and aggression, as well as worsened self-perception. The manner and degree to which alcohol expectations interact with the physiological short-term effects of alcohol, resulting in specific behaviors, is unclear. Alcohol expectations vary within a society, and people tend to conform to social expectations.

=== Drug treatment programs ===
Most addiction treatment programs encourage people with drinking problems to see themselves as having a chronic, relapsing disease that requires a lifetime of attendance at 12-step meetings to keep in check.

== Alcohol use disorder ==
The data on global alcohol consumption in 2019 shows that an estimated 400 million people aged 15 years and older live with alcohol use disorders, and an estimated 209 million live with alcohol dependence.

Addiction experts in psychiatry, chemistry, pharmacology, forensic science, epidemiology, and the police and legal services engaged in delphic analysis regarding 20 popular recreational substances. Alcohol was ranked 2nd in social harm, 6th in dependence, and 11th in physical harm.

=== Alcohol misuse prevention programs of the World Health Organization ===
More than 200 injuries and disease conditions can be caused by alcohol misuse. It is a causative agent influencing maternal health and development, noncommunicable diseases (including cancer and cardiovascular diseases), injuries, violence, mental health, and infectious diseases such as tuberculosis and HIV/AIDS. Harmful use of alcohol has been identified as a global health issue, and its management is a priority in the 2030 Agenda for Sustainable Development issued by the United Nations in 2015. In 2018, the WHO launched the "SAFER" initiative (an acronym defined from the list of planned actions give below), to decrease the number of deaths, diseases and injuries caused by alcohol misuse. Using a set of WHO tools and resources, SAFER was planned to concentrate on the interventions listed below to reduce and prevent alcohol misuse. The list of interventions were selected for prioritization based on cost effectiveness:

- Strengthen restrictions on alcohol availability.
- Advance and enforce drink driving countermeasures.
- Facilitate access to screening, brief interventions, and treatment.
- Enforce bans or comprehensive restrictions on alcohol advertising, sponsorship, and promotion.
- Raise prices on alcohol through excise taxes and pricing policies.

=== Recommended maximum intake ===
Binge drinking has been a significant issue in the United Kingdom. Advice on weekly consumption levels is often avoided in the UK. Official advice from the National Health Service is that for all genders, regularly drinking more than 14 units of alcohol a week "risks damaging your health".

Since 1995, the UK government has advised that regular consumption of three to four units (one unit equates to 10 mL of pure ethanol) a day for men and or two to three units for women, would not pose significant health risks. However, consistently drinking more than four units a day (for men) and three units (women) is not advisable.

Previously (from 1992 until 1995), the advice was that men should drink no more than 21 units per week, and women no more than 14. (The difference between the sexes was due to the typically lower weight and water-to-body-mass ratio of women.) This was changed because a government study showed that many people were in effect "saving up" their units and using them at the end of the week, a phenomenon referred to as binge drinking. The Times reported in October 2007 that these limits had been "plucked out of the air" and had no scientific basis.

=== Sobriety ===
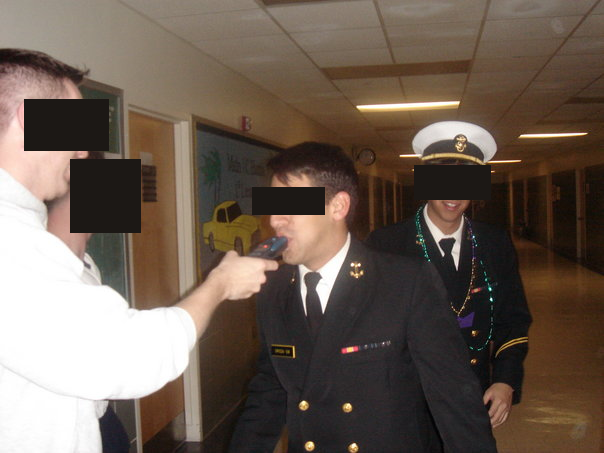
A midshipman is subjected to a random breathalyzer test to determine sobriety.

Sobriety is the condition of not having any measurable levels, or effects from mood-altering drugs. According to WHO "Lexicon of alcohol and drug terms", sobriety is continued abstinence from psychoactive drug use. Sobriety is also considered to be the natural state of a human being given at a birth. In a treatment setting, sobriety is the achieved goal of independence from consuming or craving mind-altering substances. As such, sustained abstinence is a prerequisite for sobriety. Early in abstinence, residual effects of mind-altering substances can preclude sobriety. These effects are labeled post-acute-withdrawal syndrome (PAWS). Someone who abstains, but has a latent desire to resume use, is not considered truly sober. An abstainer may be subconsciously motivated to resume drug use, but for a variety of reasons, abstains (e.g. such as a medical or legal concern precluding use). Sobriety has more specific meanings within specific contexts, such as the culture of Alcoholics Anonymous, other 12 step programs, law enforcement, and some schools of psychology. In some cases, sobriety implies achieving "life balance".

== Injury and deaths ==
The potential of injuring oneself or others can be increased after consuming alcohol due to the certain short term effects related to the substance such as lack of coordination, blurred vision, and slower reflexes to name a few. Due to these effects the most common injuries include head, fall, and vehicle-related injuries. A study was conducted of patients admitted to the Ulster Hospital in Northern Ireland with fall related injuries. They found that 113 of those patients admitted to that hospital during that had consumed alcohol recently and that the injury severity was higher for those that had consumed alcohol compared to those that had not. Another study showed that 21% of patients admitted to the Emergency Department of the Bristol Royal Infirmary had either direct or indirect alcohol related injuries. If these figures are extrapolated it shows that the estimated number of patients with alcohol related injuries are over 7,000 during the year at this emergency department alone.

In the United States alcohol resulted in about 88,000 deaths in 2010. The World Health Organization calculated that more than 3 million people, mostly men, died as a result of harmful use of alcohol in 2016. This was about 13.5% of the total deaths of people between 20 and 39. More than 5% of the global disease burden was caused by the harmful use of alcohol. There are even higher estimates for Europe.

In 2019, 298,000 deaths from alcohol-related road crashes were registered globally, out of which 156,000 deaths were caused by someone else's drinking.

=== Flaming drink ===
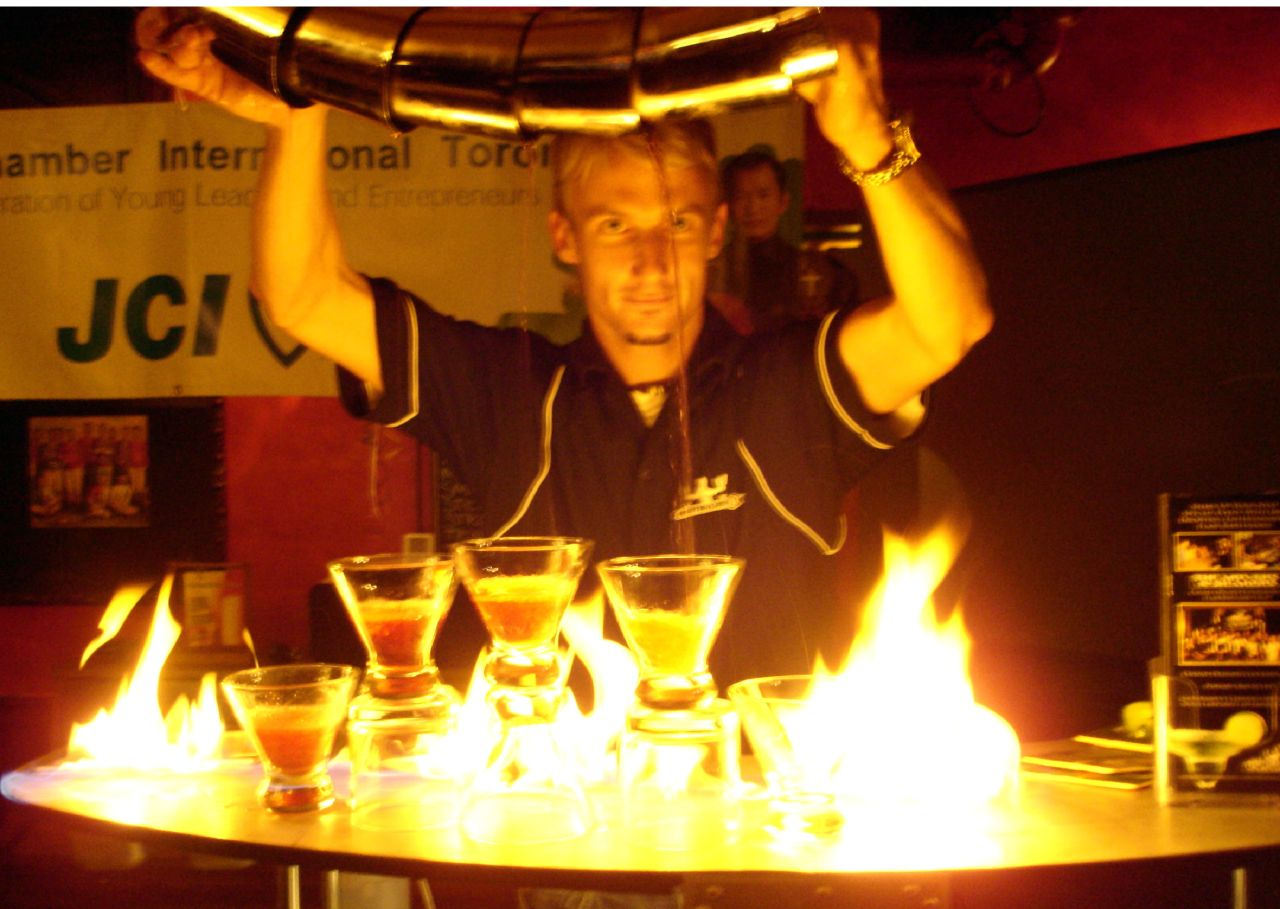
A man pouring five flaming martinis at the same time

A flaming drink is often ignited for aesthetic and entertainment purposes. However, bars have been shut down specifically due to failure to follow fire codes and reckless endangerment of patrons. Bartenders have also suffered burns from flaming drinks.

== Genetic differences ==
=== Alcohol flush and respiratory reactions ===
Alcohol flush reaction is a condition in which an individual's face or body experiences flushes (appears red) or blotches as a result of an accumulation of acetaldehyde, a metabolic byproduct of the catabolic metabolism of alcohol. It is best known as a condition that is experienced by people of Asian descent. According to the analysis by HapMap Project, the rs671 allele of the ALDH2 gene responsible for the flush reaction is rare among Europeans and Africans, and it is very rare among Mexican-Americans. 30% to 50% of people of Chinese and Japanese ancestry have at least one ALDH*2 allele. The rs671 form of ALDH2, which accounts for most incidents of alcohol flush reaction worldwide, is native to East Asia and most common in southeastern China. It most likely originated among Han Chinese in central China, and it appears to have been positively selected in the past. Another analysis correlates the rise and spread of rice cultivation in Southern China with the spread of the allele. The reasons for this positive selection are unknown, but the hypothesis that elevated concentrations of acetaldehyde may have conferred protection against certain parasitic infections, such as Entamoeba histolytica have been suggested. The same SNP allele of ALDH2, also termed glu487lys, and the abnormal accumulation of acetaldehyde following the drinking of alcohol, is associated with the alcohol-induced respiratory reactions of rhinitis and asthma that occur in Eastern Asian populations.

$\ce{H}{-} \overset{\displaystyle \ce{H} \atop |}{\underset{| \atop \displaystyle \ce{H}}{\ce C}} {-} \overset{\displaystyle \ce{H} \atop |}{\underset{| \atop \displaystyle \ce{H}}{\ce C}} \ce{-O-H ->[\ce{ADH}] H}{-} \overset{\displaystyle \ce{H} \atop |}{\underset{| \atop \displaystyle \ce{H}}{\ce C}} {-} \overset{\displaystyle \ce{H} \atop |}{\underset{\| \atop \displaystyle \ce{O}}{\ce C}} \ce{->[\ce{ALDH}] H}{-} \overset{\displaystyle \ce{H} \atop |}{\underset{| \atop \displaystyle \ce{H}}{\ce C}} {-} \overset{\color{white}{\displaystyle \ce{H} \atop |}}{\underset{\| \atop \displaystyle \ce{O}}{\ce C}} \ce{-O-H}$
Metabolism of alcohol (ethanol) to acetaldehyde (ethanal)
and then to acetic acid (ethanoic acid)

=== Alcohol and Native Americans ===
Compared with the United States population in general, the Native American population is much more susceptible to alcohol use disorder and related diseases and deaths. From 2006 to 2010, alcohol-attributed deaths accounted for 11.7 percent of all Native American deaths, more than twice the rates of the general U.S. population. The median alcohol-attributed death rate for Native Americans (60.6 per 100,000) was twice as high as the rate for any other racial or ethnic group. Males are affected disproportionately more by alcohol-related conditions than females.

Native American and Native Alaskan youth are far more likely to experiment with alcohol at a younger age than non-Native youth. Low self-esteem and transgenerational trauma have been associated with substance use disorders among Native American teens in the U.S. and Canada.

Native American populations exhibit genetic differences in the alcohol-metabolizing enzymes alcohol dehydrogenase and ALDH, although evidence that these genetic factors are more prevalent in Native Americans than other ethnic groups has been a subject of debate. According to one 2013 review of academic literature on the issue, there is a "substantial genetic component in Native Americans" and that "most Native Americans lack protective variants seen in other populations." Many scientists have provided evidence of the genetic component of alcohol use disorder by the biopsychosocial model of alcohol use disorder. Molecular genetics research currently has not found one specific gene that is responsible for the rates of alcohol use disorder among Native Americans, implying the phenomenon may be due to an interplay of multiple genes and environmental factors. Research on alcohol use disorder in families suggests that learned behavior augments genetic factors in increasing the probability that children of people with alcohol use disorder will themselves have problems with alcohol misuse.

=== Genetics and amount of consumption ===
Having a particular genetic variant (A-allele of ADH1B rs1229984) is associated with non-drinking and lower alcohol consumption. This variant is also associated with favorable cardiovascular profile and a reduced risk of coronary artery disease compared to those without the genetic variant, but it is unknown whether this may be caused by differences in alcohol consumption or by additional confounding effects of the genetic variant itself.

== Gender differences ==
Historically, according to the British Medical Journal, "men have been far more likely than women to drink alcohol and to drink it in quantities that damage their health, with some figures suggesting up to a 12-fold difference between the sexes." However, analysis of data collected over a century from multiple countries suggests that the gender gap in alcohol consumption is narrowing, and that young women (born after 1981) are consuming alcohol more than their male counterparts. Such findings have implications for the way in which alcohol-use prevention and intervention programs are designed and implemented.

=== Alcohol use disorder ===
Alcohol use disorder (AUD) is defined as a medical condition characterized by an impaired ability to stop or control alcohol use despite adverse social, occupational, or health consequences. Excessive alcohol use can lead to health-related illness and continuous alcohol engagement can ultimately lead to death. Behavioral factors of AUD include binge drinking and heavy alcohol use throughout one's day. AUD affects each culture differently, but African Americans are found to be the hardest impacted. Common health-related illnesses that stem from AUD but are prevalent in African American communities are liver disease, cirrhosis, hypertension, heart disease, oral cancer, stroke, and more. In 2020, heart disease ranked number 3 in the leading cause of death for African Americans ages 15–24. However, on the, contrary African Americans have been proven to consume less alcohol than other counterparts. According to American's Health Rankings, 15.4% of blacks reported excessive drinking, 19.4% of Hispanics, 19.2% of whites and 16.9% of Native Americans. In the United States, social economic status affects, one's ability to access basic necessities to support one's health, life, and survival. If one has a higher socioeconomic status, their income is higher, they are able to support their living needs and have better access to healthcare. Higher SES status reduces the risk of AUD for all individuals. However, those with a lower socioeconomic status majority of minorities are less fortunate. They are faced with poverty, low income, unemployment, and lack of access to healthier food options, which then contributes to poor health and higher AUD risk. The correlation between levels of socioeconomic status is prominent in alcohol-related health illnesses between cultures.

=== Sensitivity ===
Several biological factors make women more vulnerable to the effects of alcohol than men.

- Body fat. Women tend to weigh less than men, and—pound for pound—a woman's body contains less water and more fatty tissue than a man's. Because fat retains alcohol while water dilutes it, alcohol remains at higher concentrations for longer periods of time in a woman's body, exposing her brain and other organs to more alcohol.
- Enzymes. Women have lower levels of two enzymes—alcohol dehydrogenase and aldehyde dehydrogenase—that metabolize (break down) alcohol in the stomach and liver. As a result, women absorb more alcohol into their bloodstreams than men.
- Hormones. Changes in hormone levels during the menstrual cycle may also affect how a woman metabolizes alcohol.

=== Metabolism ===
Females demonstrated a higher average rate of elimination (mean, 0.017; range, 0.014–0.021 g/210 L) than males (mean, 0.015; range, 0.013–0.017 g/210 L). Female subjects on average had a higher percentage of body fat (mean, 26.0; range, 16.7–36.8%) than males (mean, 18.0; range, 10.2–25.3%). Further explanation for the difference in alcohol metabolism between males and females can be found in higher alcohol dehydrogenase activity in female livers.

=== Depression ===
The link between alcohol consumption, depression, and gender was examined by the Centre for Addiction and Mental Health (Canada). The study found that women taking antidepressants consumed more alcohol than women who did not experience depression as well as men taking antidepressants. The researchers, Kathryn Graham and a PhD Student, Agnes Massak, analyzed the responses to a survey by 14,063 Canadian residents aged 18–76 years. The survey included measures of quantity, frequency of drinking, depression, and antidepressant use, over the period of a year. The researchers used data from the GENACIS Canada survey, part of an international collaboration to investigate the influence of cultural variation on gender differences in alcohol use and related problems. The purpose of the study was to examine whether, like in other studies already conducted on male depression and alcohol consumption, depressed women also consumed less alcohol when taking anti-depressants. According to the study, both men and women experiencing depression (but not on antidepressants) drank more than non-depressed counterparts. Men taking antidepressants consumed significantly less alcohol than depressed men who did not use antidepressants. Non-depressed men consumed 436 drinks per year, compared to 579 drinks for depressed men not using antidepressants, and 414 drinks for depressed men who used antidepressants. Alcohol consumption remained higher whether the depressed women were taking antidepressants or not. 179 drinks per year for non-depressed women, 235 drinks for depressed women not using antidepressants, and 264 drinks for depressed women who used antidepressants. The lead researcher argued that the study "suggests that the use of antidepressants is associated with lower alcohol consumption among men with depression. But this does not appear to be true for women."

=== Teenage alcohol abuse ===
While most teens understand the negative impacts of drinking a lot of alcohol in one sitting, many believe that consuming some alcohol will not be that risky of a behavior. However, teens who drink alcohol on average consume more alcohol in one sitting than most adults, and nearly half of all teens who consumed some amount of alcohol in the past 30 days had done so in excess. Not only are teen drinkers more likely to get drunk, but the effects of drunkenness are worse. The temporarily impaired judgment can lead to permanent consequences such as serious and crippling injury to oneself or others, unplanned pregnancy, or alcoholism later in life. Even if they were to avoid terrible events, they will still suffer irreversible damage to brain development and be far more likely to abuse other substances in the future.

== Benefits of quitting alcohol ==
The health benefits of quitting alcohol consumption are numerous and can significantly improve both physical and mental well-being. While the long-term effects of alcohol consumption are known to be detrimental, capable of damaging nearly every organ and system in the body and increasing the risk of chronic diseases like alcoholic liver disease, various cardiovascular diseases, and multiple types of cancer, ceasing alcohol intake allows the body to begin a process of recovery and can mitigate many of these risks. The World Health Organization (WHO) emphasizes that no level of alcohol consumption is without health risks, highlighting the importance of cessation or reduction for health improvement.

These positive changes often manifest relatively quickly after stopping drinking and continue to develop over weeks, months, and years. Physiologically, benefits include improved sleep quality, enhanced liver function and potential reversal of early-stage liver damage, better cardiovascular health markers such as lowered blood pressure, improved immune system function, and, in overweight individuals, a reduction in body fat.Psychologically and mentally, individuals often report increased mental clarity, reduced anxiety, more stable mood, and enhanced cognitive function.

=== Physiological benefits ===
One of the earliest and most significant physiological benefits reported after quitting alcohol is a marked improvement in sleep quality. While alcohol can act as a sedative and induce drowsiness, it disrupts the natural sleep architecture, particularly the later stages of REM sleep, which are crucial for cognitive function and emotional regulation. Consequently, alcohol-influenced sleep is often less restful and restorative. Upon cessation, individuals typically find their sleep patterns normalize, leading to deeper, more consistent, and higher-quality sleep. This, in turn, contributes to increased daytime energy levels, improved concentration, and better overall physical and mental alertness.

The liver, the primary organ responsible for metabolizing alcohol, benefits greatly from abstinence. Chronic alcohol consumption can lead to a spectrum of liver damage, starting with alcoholic fatty liver disease. Stopping alcohol intake allows the liver an opportunity to repair and regenerate. In early stages, fatty liver disease can often be reversed with sustained abstinence. Halting alcohol consumption also reduces liver inflammation and can prevent the progression to more severe and potentially irreversible conditions such as alcoholic hepatitis, fibrosis (scarring of the liver), and ultimately, cirrhosis, which significantly impairs liver function and can be life-threatening.

Cardiovascular health also tends to improve when alcohol consumption ceases. Alcohol is known to contribute to high blood pressure, can cause irregular heartbeats (arrhythmia), and over time may weaken the heart muscle, leading to cardiomyopathy. Discontinuing alcohol can lead to a reduction in blood pressure, a more stable heart rhythm, and an overall decrease in the strain on the cardiovascular system, thereby lowering the risk of stroke, heart attack, and other heart-related complications. Furthermore, many alcoholic beverages are calorie-dense and can contribute to weight gain and related health issues. Quitting alcohol reduces this "empty" caloric intake, often aiding in weight management or loss, and can lead to improved metabolic health. As alcohol is a diuretic and can lead to dehydration, stopping its consumption helps restore and maintain proper hydration levels, benefiting skin appearance, kidney function, and overall physiological balance.

A major long-term benefit of quitting alcohol is a reduced risk of developing various cancers. Ethanol is classified as a Group 1 carcinogen by the International Agency for Research on Cancer, meaning it is a known cause of cancer in humans. Cessation helps to lower the increased risk associated with alcohol for cancers of the mouth, pharynx (throat), larynx (voice box), esophagus, liver, colorectum, and, in women, the breast. The risk reduction becomes more substantial with longer periods of abstinence, as the body has more time to repair cellular damage caused by alcohol and its byproducts.

=== Psychological and mental benefits ===
Beyond the physical improvements, quitting alcohol frequently leads to significant enhancements in mental clarity and cognitive function. Many individuals report a noticeable lifting of brain fog, experiencing sharper focus, improved concentration, better memory recall, and more effective problem-solving abilities.

Mood regulation often improves considerably. While alcohol is sometimes perceived as a way to manage stress or alleviate low mood, it can often disrupt neurotransmitter balance and worsen conditions like anxiety and depression in the long run. Cessation can lead to a marked reduction in anxiety symptoms, including the common post-drinking anxiety often termed hangxiety, and contribute to a more stable and positive overall emotional state, with fewer pronounced mood swings.

== See also ==
- Dry January
- Long-term effects of alcohol consumption
- Short-term effects of alcohol consumption
