= Alcohol and breast cancer =

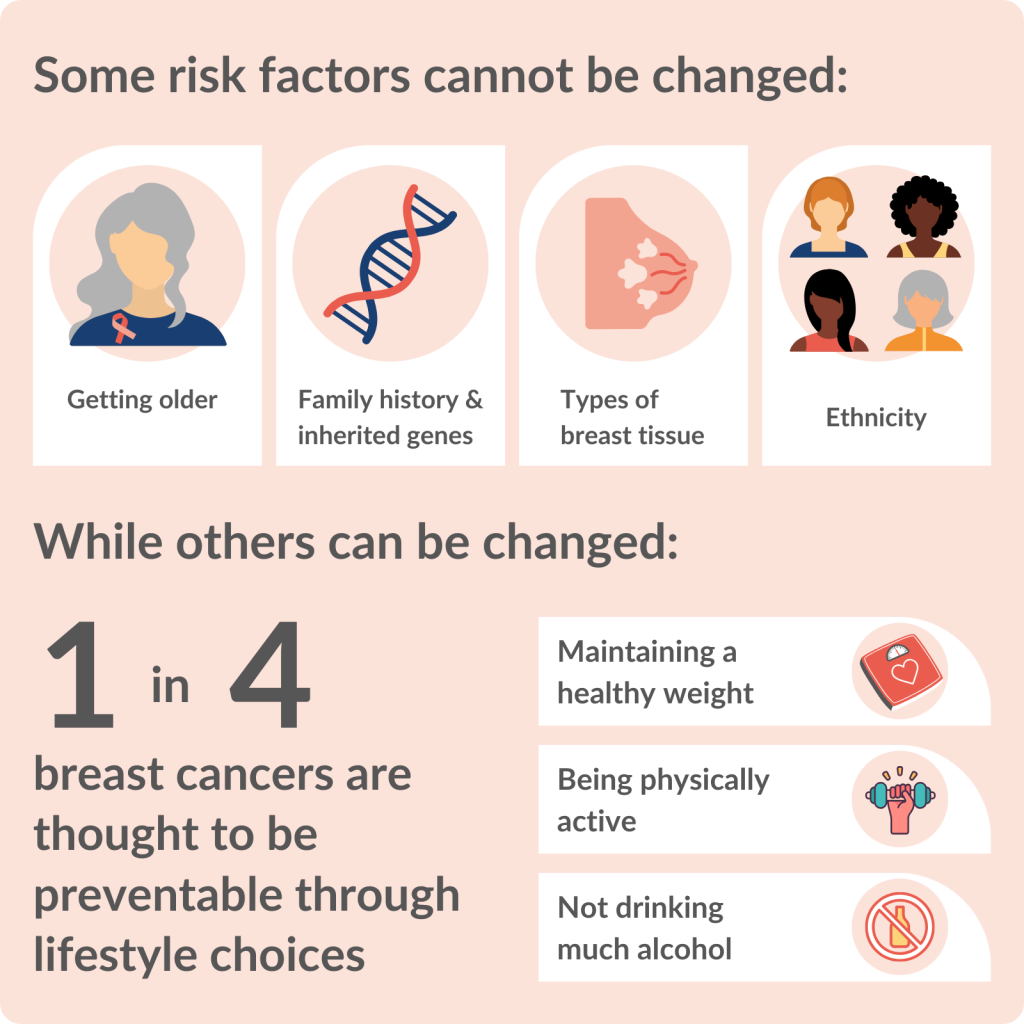
Alcohol is a risk factor that can be eliminated

The relationship between alcohol and breast cancer is clear: drinking alcoholic beverages, including wine, beer, or liquor, is a risk factor for breast cancer, as well as some other forms of cancer. Drinking alcohol causes more than 100,000 cases of breast cancer worldwide every year. Globally, almost one in 10 cases of breast cancer is caused by women drinking alcoholic beverages. Drinking alcoholic beverages is among the most common modifiable risk factors.

The International Agency for Research on Cancer has declared that there is sufficient scientific evidence to classify alcoholic beverages a Group 1 carcinogen that causes breast cancer in women. Group 1 carcinogens are the substances with the clearest scientific evidence that they cause cancer, such as smoking tobacco.

A woman drinking an average of two units of alcohol per day has 13% higher risk of developing breast cancer than a woman who drinks an average of one unit of alcohol per day. Even light consumption of alcohol – one to three drinks per week – increases the risk of breast cancer.

Heavy drinkers are also more likely to die from breast cancer than non-drinkers and light drinkers. Also, the more alcohol a woman consumes, the more likely she is to be diagnosed with a recurrence after initial treatment.

== Mechanism ==
The mechanisms of increased breast cancer risk by alcohol are not clear, and may be:

- Increased estrogen and androgen levels
- Enhanced mammary gland susceptibility to carcinogenics
- Increased mammary DNA damage
- Greater metastatic potential of breast cancer cells

Their magnitude likely depends on the amount of alcohol consumed.

Susceptibility to the breast cancer risk of alcohol may also be increased by other dietary factors (e.g. folate deficiency), lifestyle habits (including use of hormone replacement therapy), or biological characteristics (e.g. as hormone receptor expression in tumor cells).

== Light and moderate drinking ==
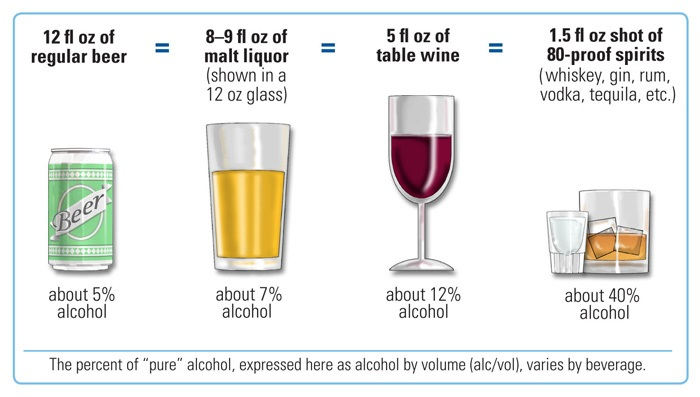
All types of alcoholic beverages, including beer, wine, or liquor, cause breast cancer.

Drinking alcoholic beverages increases the risk of breast cancer, even among very light drinkers (women drinking less than half of one alcoholic drink per day). The risk is highest among heavy drinkers.

Light drinking is one to three alcoholic drinks per week, and moderate drinking is about one drink per day. Both light and moderate drinking is associated with a higher risk of being diagnosed with breast cancer. However, the increased risk caused by light drinking is smaller than the risk for heavy drinking.

== In daughters of drinking mothers ==
Studies suggest that drinking alcohol during pregnancy may affect the likelihood of breast cancer in daughters. "For women who are pregnant, ingestion of alcohol, even in moderation, may lead to elevated circulating oestradiol levels, either through a reduction of melatonin or some other mechanism. This may then affect the developing mammary tissue such that the lifetime risk of breast cancer is raised in their daughters."

== Recurrence ==
Drinking or not drinking alcohol does not solely determine whether breast cancer will recur after treatment. However, the more a woman drinks, the more likely the cancer is to recur.

== In men ==
In men, breast cancer is rare, with an incidence of fewer than one case per 100,000 men. Population studies have returned mixed results about excessive consumption of alcohol as a risk factor. One study suggests that alcohol consumption may increase risk at a rate of 16% per 10 g daily alcohol consumption. Others have shown no effect at all, though these studies had small populations of alcoholics.

== Epidemiology ==
Worldwide, alcohol consumption causes approximately 144,000 women to be diagnosed with breast cancer each year. Approximately 38,000 women die from alcohol-induced breast cancer each year. About 80% of these women were heavy or moderate drinkers.
