= Impact of alcohol on aging =

General health article

The impact of alcohol on aging is multifaceted. Evidence shows that alcoholism or alcohol abuse can cause both accelerated (or premature) aging – in which symptoms of aging appear earlier than normal – and exaggerated aging, in which the symptoms appear at the appropriate time but in a more exaggerated form. The effects of alcohol use disorder on the aging process include hypertension, cardiac dysrhythmia, cancers, gastrointestinal disorders, neurocognitive deficits, bone loss, and emotional disturbances especially depression. Furthermore, chronic ethanol consumption can contribute to premature aging by depleting cellular NAD+, a key coenzyme vital for DNA repair and maintaining cellular health through proteins like sirtuins.

== Metabolic effects and cellular damage ==
Chronic ethanol consumption is increasingly understood to contribute to accelerated aging through various mechanisms, notably via the depletion and altered balance of nicotinamide adenine dinucleotide (NAD+). The metabolism of ethanol, primarily in the liver by enzymes such as alcohol dehydrogenase and aldehyde dehydrogenase, requires NAD+ as a cofactor, converting it to its reduced form, NADH. This process significantly increases the NADH/NAD+ ratio, leading to a relative depletion of available NAD+ within cells. NAD+ is a crucial coenzyme for sirtuins, a class of proteins vital for maintaining cellular health, promoting DNA repair, regulating metabolism, enhancing mitochondrial function, and improving stress resistance—all processes that counteract aging. The reduced availability of NAD+ due to chronic alcohol consumption can therefore impair sirtuin activity, diminishing these protective cellular functions. Additionally, alcohol and its toxic metabolite acetaldehyde can cause DNA damage, which triggers the activation of Poly(ADP-ribose) polymerases (PARPs), enzymes that heavily consume NAD+ during the DNA repair process, further exacerbating NAD+ depletion. Given that NAD+ levels naturally decline with age, this alcohol-induced disruption of NAD+ homeostasis and the subsequent impairment of critical NAD+-dependent pathways like those mediated by sirtuins and PARPs can contribute to features indicative of accelerated aging and an increased susceptibility to age-related diseases.

== Brain ==
Alcohol is a potent neurotoxin. The National Institute on Alcohol Abuse and Alcoholism has found, "Alcoholism may accelerate normal aging or cause premature aging of the brain." Another report by the same agency found, "Chronic alcohol consumption, as well as chronic glucocorticoid exposure, can result in premature and/or exaggerated aging." Specifically, alcohol activates the HPA axis, causing glucocorticoid secretion and thus elevating levels of stress hormones in the body. Chronic exposure to these hormones results in an acceleration of the aging process, which is associated with "gradual, but often dramatic, changes over time in almost every physiological system in the human body. Combined, these changes result in decreased efficiency and resiliency of physiological function." Chronic stress and chronic heavy alcohol use cause a similar premature aging effect, including nerve cell degeneration in the hippocampus.

== Heart ==
According to the National Institutes of Health, researchers now understand that drinking moderate amounts of alcohol can protect the hearts of some people from the risks of coronary artery disease. But, it's not possible to predict in which people alcoholism will become a problem. Given these and other risks, the American Heart Association cautions people not to start drinking.

== Life expectancy ==
A 2010 study in Alcoholism: Clinical and Experimental Research followed 1,824 participants between the ages of 55 and 65 and found that even after adjusting for all suspected covariates, abstainers and heavy drinkers continued to show increased mortality risks of 51 and 45%, respectively, compared to moderate drinkers. A follow-up study lists several cautions in interpreting the findings. For example, the results do not address nor endorse initiation of drinking among nondrinkers, and persons who have medical conditions which would be worsened by alcohol consumption should not drink alcohol. Additional research suggests that the reasons for alcohol abstinence may be a determining factor in the outcomes for abstainers: those who do not drink because of existing medical conditions or because of previous substance use disorder issues have the highest rates of early death among the abstainers. Other groups of abstainers, such as those who do not drink because of family upbringing or moral/religious reasons, have mortality risks that are as low as those who drink in moderation.

== Demographics ==
Excessive alcohol consumption, especially of distilled alcohol, is responsible for higher mortality rates and lower life expectancy for men in Eastern Europe, especially the former Soviet Union.

== See also ==
- Alcohol dementia
