= Alcohol consumption recommendations =

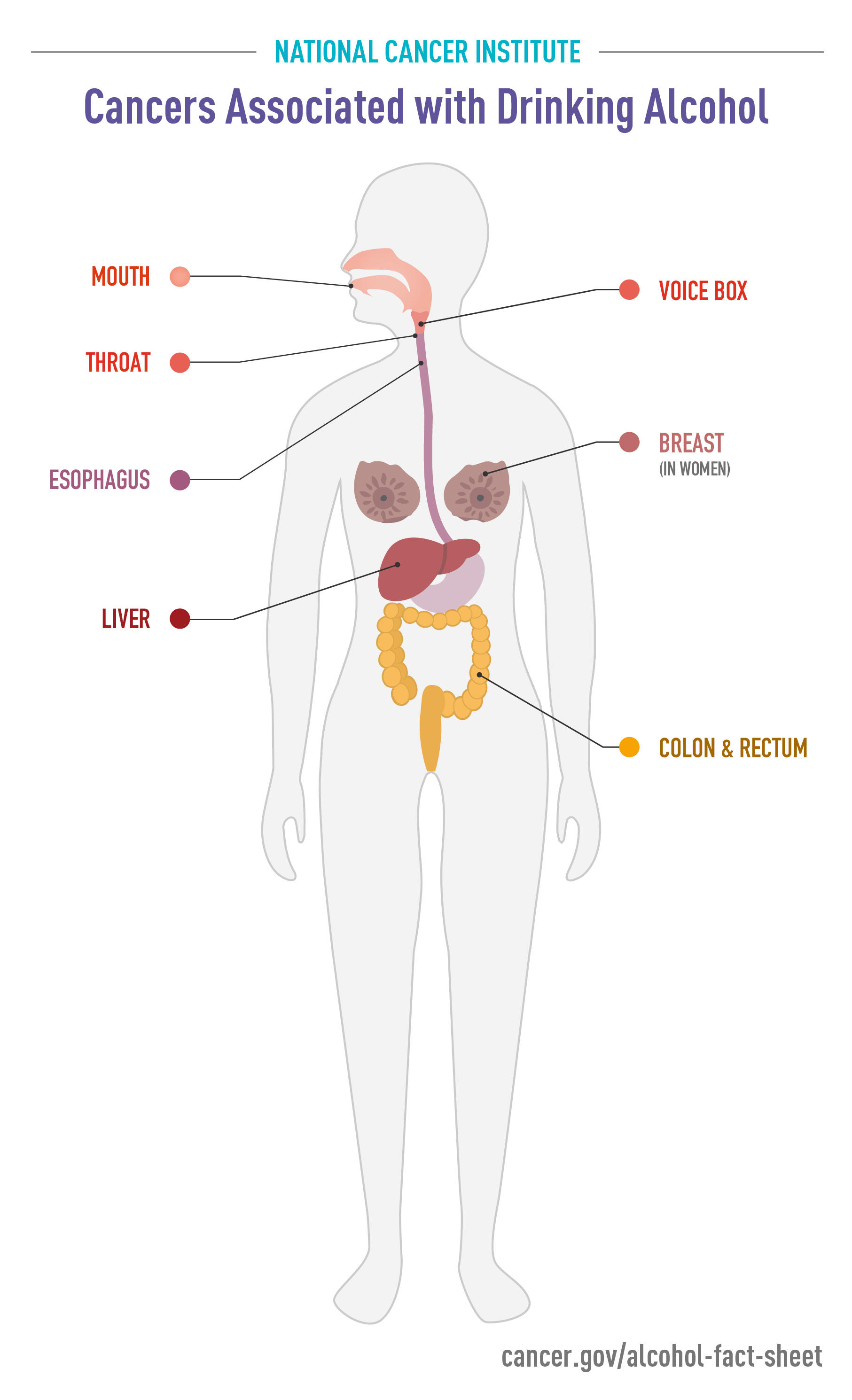

Recommendations for consumption of the drug alcohol (also known formally as ethanol) vary from recommendations to be alcohol-free to daily or weekly drinking "low risk limits" or maximum intakes. Many governmental agencies and organizations have issued guidelines. These recommendations concerning maximum intake are distinct from any legal restrictions, for example countries with drunk driving laws or countries that have prohibited alcohol. To varying degrees, these recommendations are also distinct from the scientific evidence, such as the short-term and long-term effects of alcohol consumption. From a scientific and medical standpoint, the World Health Organization recommendation is teetotalism, with this being published in The Lancet in April 2023: "there is no safe amount [of alcohol] that does not affect health".

== General recommendations ==
These guidelines apply to men and women who do not belong to populations with more specific advice.

=== Teetotalism advocacy by organization ===
Share of over-fifteen-year-old population who have not drunk alcohol in the past year (interactive version); in most countries, it exceeds a third.

- The World Health Organization published a statement in The Lancet Public Health in April 2023 that "there is no safe amount that does not affect health".
  - The World Heart Federation (recognized by the World Health Organization as its leading NGO partner) (2022) recommends against any alcohol intake for optimal heart health.
- The 2023 Nordic Nutrition Recommendations state "Since no safe limit for alcohol consumption can be provided, the recommendation in NNR2023 is that everyone should avoid drinking alcohol."
- The American Heart Association recommends that those who do not already consume alcoholic beverages should not start doing so because of the negative long-term effects of alcohol consumption.

=== Recommended alcohol intake limitations by country ===
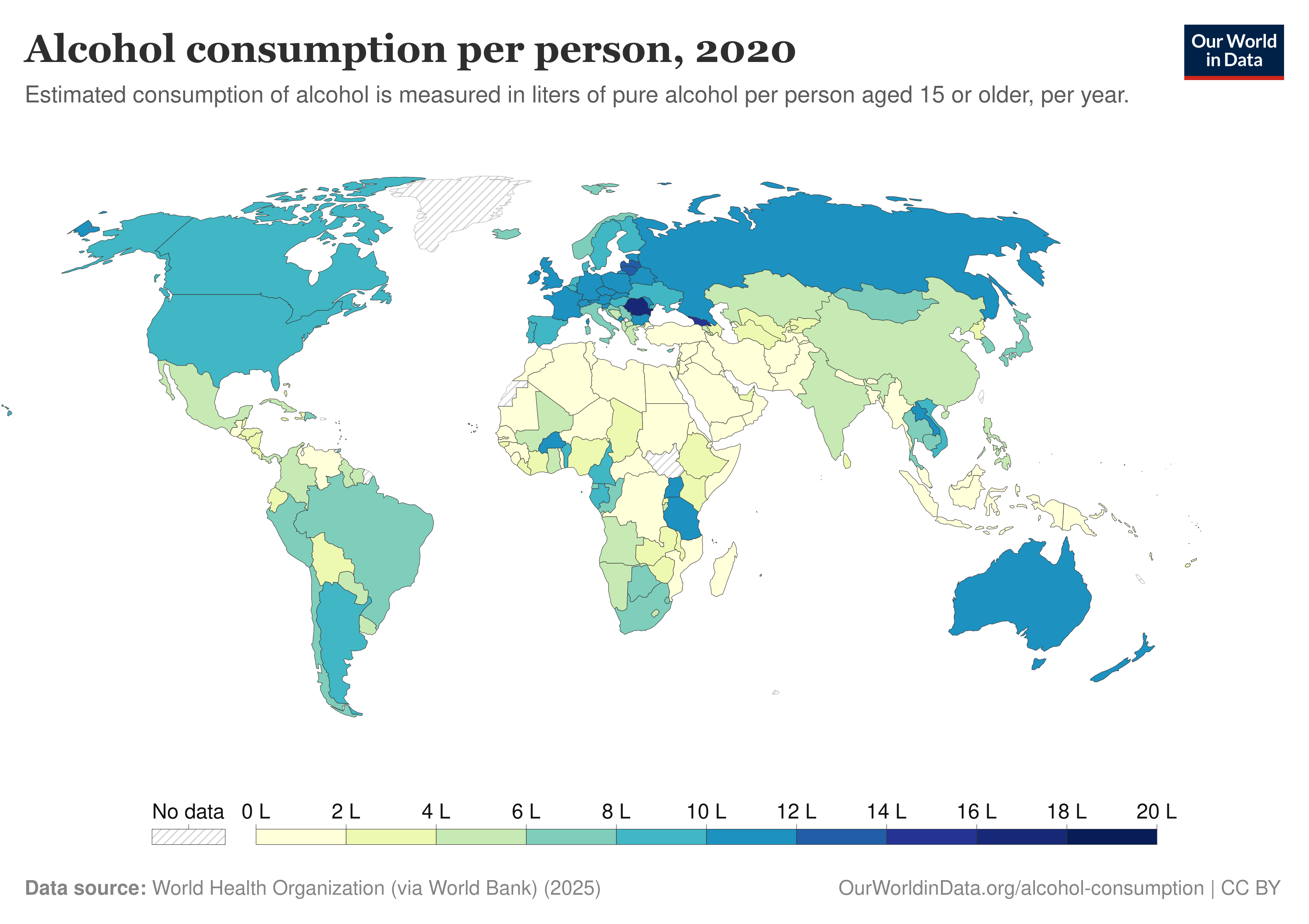
Alcohol consumption per person in 2020. Consumption of alcohol is measured in liters of pure alcohol per person aged 15 or older.

Some governments set the same recommendation for both sexes, while others give separate limits. The guidelines give drink amounts in a variety of formats, such as standard drinks, fluid ounces, or milliliters, but have been converted to grams of ethanol for ease of comparison.

Approximately one-third of all countries advocate for complete alcohol abstinence, while all nations impose upper limits on alcohol consumption. Their daily limits range from 10-48 g per day for both men and women, and weekly limits range from 27-196 g/week for men and 27-140 g/week for women. The weekly limits are lower than the daily limits, meaning intake on a particular day may be higher than one-seventh of the weekly amount, but consumption on other days of the week should be lower. The limits for women are often but not always lower than those for men.

Country (or region)	Teetotalism recommended	Low risk				Medium to risky drinking				Heavy drinking						Details
Country (or region)	Teetotalism recommended	Day		Week		Day		Week		Day		Week		Month		Details
Country (or region)	Teetotalism recommended	Men	Women	Men	Women	Men	Women	Men	Women	Men	Women	Men	Women	Men	Women	Details
Australia		40 g		100 g												Reference.
Austria		24 g	16 g													
Canada	"Not drinking has benefits, such as better health, and better sleep."	40.35 g with no more than 5 drinking days per week per the federal government	26.9 g with no more than 5 drinking days per week per the federal government	27 g, CCSUA; 201.75g, federal government	27 g, CCSUA; 134.5g, federal government	53.8 g on special occasions per the federal government	40.35 g on special occasions per the federal government									The Canadian Centre on Substance Use and Addiction has a sliding scale of intakes. The scale states that at 27 g or less per week, "you are likely to avoid alcohol-related consequences for yourself or others". However, the Canadian Government has not officially adopted the Centre's recommendations and the 2011 guidelines remain federal policy.
Czech Republic		24 g	16 g													
Denmark		48 g		120 g												Reference.
Finland				168 g	84 g											Reference.
Germany	Alcoholic beverages pose health risks and ideally should be avoided completely.															The German Centre for Addiction Issues recommends everyone to reduce alcohol consumption, regardless of the amounts consumed.
Hong Kong		20 g	10 g													Reference.
Iceland		32 g														"Stop drinking before reaching five drinks on the same occasion". 1 standard drink in Iceland = 8 g ethanol. 8 g x 4 drinks = 32 g.
Ireland				170 g	140 g											Reference.
Italy		24 g	12 g													Reference.
Japan		40 g	20 g													Reference.
Netherlands	Recommends an alcohol consumption level of zero grams.	10 g														"The Health Council of the Netherlands included a guideline for alcohol consumption in the Dutch dietary guidelines 2015 (DDG-2015), which is as follows: 'Don't drink alcohol or no more than one glass daily'." "In the Netherlands, one regular glass of an alcoholic beverage contains approximately 10 grammes (12 millilitre) alcohol."
New Zealand		30 g	20 g	150 g	100 g	50 g	40 g									At least two alcohol-free days every week. 30 g for men, 20 g for women To reduce long-term health risks 50 g for men, 40 g for women On any single occasion, to reduce risk of injury.
Norway		20 g	10 g													Reference.
Poland		40 g	20 g													Maximum 5 drinking days per week. Reference.
Portugal		37 g	18.5 g													Reference.
Spain		30 g	20 g													Also suggests a maximum of no more than twice this on any one occasion.
Sweden	"Not possible to specify a limit for risk-free alcohol consumption."					48 g		120 g								The National Board of Health and Welfare defines risky consumption as 10 (Swedish) standard drinks per week (120 g), and 4 standard drinks (48 g) or more per occasion, once per month or more often. Alcohol intervention is offered for people who exceed these recommendations.
Switzerland		30 g	20–24 g													Reference.
United Kingdom	"There's no completely safe level of drinking."			112 g a week, spread across 3 days or more.												Reference.
USA	"People who do not drink should not start drinking for any reason." (DGA) "Adults of legal drinking age can choose not to drink." (DGA)	14-28 g (1-2 US standard drinks) (DGA) (Note: "The Committee recommended that adults limit alcohol intake to no more than 1 drink per day for both women and men for better health)" "For those who choose to drink, intakes should be limited to 1 drink or less in a day for women and 2 drinks or less in a day for men, on days when alcohol is consumed." "Alcohol has been found to increase risk for cancer, and for some types of cancer, the risk increases even at low levels of alcohol consumption (less than 1 drink in a day). Caution, therefore, is recommended." "Drinking less is better for health than drinking more.")	14 g (1 US standard drink) (DGA)			0.08% BAC (NIAAA), or 70 g (SAMHSA)	0.08% BAC (NIAAA), or 56 g (SAMHSA)			70 grams (5 US standard drinks) or more in a single day) (NIAAA)	56 grams (4 US standard drinks) or more in a single day) (NIAAA)	210 g (15 US standard drinks) (NIAAA)	112 g (8 US standard drinks) (NIAAA)	Five binge drinking sessions, each involving 70 grams (5 US standard drinks) of alcohol (SAMHSA).	Five binge drinking sessions, each involving 56 grams (4 US standard drinks) of alcohol (SAMHSA)	References: CDC. NIAAA, SAMHSA. 2020-2025 Dietary Guidelines for Americans

=== By study ===
Emerging evidence suggests that "even drinking within the recommended limits may increase the overall risk of death from various causes, such as from several types of cancer". It is not clear that alcohol has any beneficial effects, as the better health outcomes that some studies reported may be due not to alcohol consumption itself but instead be caused by "other differences in behaviors or genetics between people who drink moderately and people who don't". At 20 g/day (1 large beer), the risk of developing an alcohol use disorder (AUD) is nearly 3 times higher than non-drinkers, and the risk of dying from an AUD is about 2 times higher than non-drinkers. One systematic analysis found that "The level of alcohol consumption that minimised harm across health outcomes was zero (95% UI 0·0–0·8) standard drinks per week". Supposing the apparent beneficial effects found in observational studies are genuine, these effects are maximized at relatively low levels of consumption, ranging from 1-18 g/day depending on age, location, and gender.

== Specific populations ==
=== Pregnant women ===
A label on alcoholic drinks promoting zero alcohol during pregnancy

Excessive drinking during pregnancy, especially in the first eight to twelve weeks, is associated with fetal alcohol spectrum disorders such as abnormal appearance and behavioral problems. Most guidelines state that no safe amount of alcohol consumption has been established and recommend that pregnant women abstain entirely from alcohol. As there may be some weeks between conception and confirmation of pregnancy, most guidelines also recommend that women trying or likely to become pregnant should avoid alcohol as well.

- Australia: Total abstinence during pregnancy and if planning a pregnancy
- Canada: "Don't drink if you are pregnant or planning to become pregnant."
- France: Total abstinence
- Hong Kong: "Abstinence from alcohol during pregnancy is the safest choice."
- Iceland: Advise that pregnant women abstain from alcohol during pregnancy because no safe consumption level exists.
- Israel: Women should avoid consuming alcohol before and during pregnancy
- The Netherlands: Abstinence
- New Zealand: "Women who are pregnant or planning to become pregnant should avoid drinking alcohol."
- Norway: Abstinence
- Sweden: Abstinence.
- UK: Abstinence during pregnancy
- US: Total abstinence during pregnancy and while planning to become pregnant

=== Breastfeeding women ===
Moderate alcohol consumption by breastfeeding mothers can significantly affect infants. Even one or two drinks, including beer, may reduce milk intake by 20 to 23%, leading to increased agitation and poor sleep patterns. Regular heavy drinking (more than two drinks daily) can shorten breastfeeding duration and cause issues in infants, such as excessive sedation, fluid retention, and hormonal imbalances. Additionally, higher alcohol consumption may negatively impact children's academic achievement.

- Australia: Total abstinence advised
- Canada: "When breastfeeding, not drinking alcohol is safest."
- Hong Kong: "Avoid alcohol and alcoholic drinks."
- Iceland: Total abstinence advised because no safe consumption level exists.
- New Zealand: Abstinence recommended, especially in the first month of breastfeeding so that sound breastfeeding patterns can be established.
- United Kingdom: Total abstinence advised by some, such as the Royal College of Midwives; others advise to limit alcohol to occasional use in small amounts not exceeding the recommended maximums for non-breastfeeding woman as this is known to cause harm, and that daily or binge drinking be avoided.

=== Minors ===
Countries have different recommendations concerning the administration of alcohol to minors by adults.

- United Kingdom: An alcohol-free childhood is the healthiest option. Children aged under 15 should never be given alcohol, even in small quantities. Children aged 15–17 should not be given alcohol on more than one day a week – and then only under supervision from carers or parents.
- Singapore: A recurring message of the Get Your Sexy Back campaign is that consuming 5 or more units of alcohol (70 g pure ethanol) at a single sitting constitutes binge drinking.

=== Former alcoholics ===
- USA: According to the 2020-2025 Dietary Guidelines for Americans, alcohol consumption is not recommended for certain individuals. Specifically, those who are in recovery from Alcohol Use Disorder (AUD) or struggle to limit their alcohol intake should abstain from drinking entirely.

=== Elderly ===
- Italy: 12 g/day for men over 65.
- Japan: Less than 29 g/day for the elderly (and women).

== Caveats ==
=== Risk factors ===
The recommended limits for daily or weekly consumption provided in the various countries' guidelines generally apply to the average healthy adult. However, many guidelines also set out numerous conditions under which alcohol intake should be further restricted or eliminated. They may stipulate that, among other things, people with liver, kidney, or other chronic disease, cancer risk factors, smaller body size, young or advanced age, those who have experienced issues with mental health, sleep disturbances, alcohol or drug dependency or who have a close family member who has, or who are taking medication that may interact with alcohol, or suffering or recovering from an illness or accident, are urged to consider, in consultation with their health professionals, a different level of alcohol use, including reduction or abstention.

=== Activities ===
Furthermore, the maximum amounts allowed do not apply to those involved with activities such as operating vehicles or machinery, risky sports or other activities, or those responsible for the safety of others.

Moreover, studies suggest even moderate alcohol consumption may significantly impair – neurobiologically beneficial and -demanding – exercise (possibly including the recovery and adaptation).

=== Drinking patterns ===
As of 2022, moderate consumption levels of alcoholic beverages are typically defined in terms of average consumption per day or week. However, drinking pattern (i.e. frequency, timing and dosage/intensity) is also significant. Although countries define binge drinking in different ways, the consensus recommendation is to avoid any form of binge drinking pattern, in addition to not exceeding the daily or weekly limit. Studies analyzing binge drinking have consistently found negative effects. Although there are few studies or guidelines on moderate consumption patterns, the general advice is that one should spread out consumption as evenly as possible, if one is consuming a fixed amount.

However, it is also easy, when drinking daily, to become habituated to alcohol's effects (consumption-induced tolerance). Most people cannot accurately judge how much alcohol they are consuming, particularly relative to the amounts specified in guidelines. Alcohol-free days provide a baseline and help people cut down on problematic drinking. One review showed that among drinkers (not limited to moderate consumption levels), daily drinking in comparison to non-daily drinking was associated with incidence of liver cirrhosis.

== Alcohol promotion recommendations ==
Polymeal and most versions of the Mediterranean diet recommend a moderate amount of red wine, such as 150 mL (about one glass) every day, in combination with other several food items. Since about 2016, the American Heart Association and American Diabetes Association have recommended the Mediterranean diet as a healthy dietary pattern that may reduce the risk of cardiovascular diseases and type 2 diabetes, respectively. The United Kingdom's National Health Service also recommends a Mediterranean diet to reduce cardiovascular disease risk. The WHO has stated that there is currently no conclusive evidence that the potential benefits of moderate alcohol consumption for cardiovascular disease and type 2 diabetes outweigh the increased cancer risk associated with these drinking levels for individual consumers. A trial in Spain is expected to complete in 2028.

== Units and standard drinks ==
Guidelines generally give recommended amounts measured in grams (g) of pure alcohol per day or week. Some guidelines also express alcohol intake in standard drinks or units of alcohol. The size of a standard drink varies widely among the various guidelines, from 8g to 20g, as does the recommended number of standard drinks per day or week. The standard drink size is not meant as recommendations for how much alcohol a drink should contain, but rather to give a common reference that people can use for measuring their intake, though they may or may not correspond to a typical serving size in their country.

== See also ==
- Standard drink
- Health benefits of quitting alcohol
- Long-term effects of alcohol
