= Long-term effects of alcohol =

Health effects of long-term alcohol consumption

The long-term effects of alcohol consumption on health are predominantly detrimental, with the severity and range of harms generally increasing with the cumulative amount of alcohol consumed over a lifetime. The extent of these effects varies depending on several factors, including the quantity and frequency of alcohol intake, as well as individual genetic and lifestyle factors. Alcohol is recognized as a direct cause of several diseases, including cancer. The International Agency for Research on Cancer (IARC) classifies alcohol as a Group 1 carcinogen, meaning it is capable of causing cancer in humans. Research shows a causal link between alcohol consumption and at least seven types of cancer, including cancers of the oropharynx (mouth and throat), esophagus, liver, colorectum, and female breast. The risk begins with any level of consumption and goes up with higher intake—even light or moderate drinking adds to the risk. No level of alcohol consumption has been identified as completely safe in terms of cancer risk. The biological mechanisms include the damage caused by acetaldehyde, a toxic byproduct of alcohol metabolism, which can alter DNA, and the generation of oxidative stress.

Beyond cancer, chronic and excessive alcohol use—as seen in alcohol use disorder—is capable of damaging nearly every part of the body. Such use is linked to alcoholic liver disease, which can progress to cirrhosis and chronic pancreatitis; various forms of cardiovascular disease, including hypertension, coronary heart disease, heart failure, and atrial fibrillation; and digestive conditions such as gastritis and stomach ulcers. Alcohol also interferes with how the body absorbs nutrients, which can lead to malnutrition. Long-term use can cause alcohol-related dementia and damage to the peripheral nervous system, leading to conditions like painful peripheral neuropathy. Drinkers are also more likely to get injured in accidents, including traffic accidents and falls, and may age faster.

Children and fetuses are especially at risk. Alcohol consumption during pregnancy can result in fetal alcohol spectrum disorders (FASDs), a range of lifelong physical, behavioral, and intellectual disabilities. In response to these risks, some countries now require alcohol packaging warning messages that mention cancer risks and pregnancy dangers.

Although some studies have proposed potential health benefits of light alcohol consumption—such as reduced risk of cardiovascular disease, type 2 diabetes, gastritis, and cholelithiasis— experts, including the World Health Organization (WHO), have questioned the validity of these studies, and say these possible benefits are small and uncertain when weighed against the well-known risks, especially cancer. While alcohol may provide short term effects of temporary stress reduction, mood elevation, or increased sociability, experts emphasize that, in the long run, the significant and cumulative health consequences of alcohol use outweigh these perceived psychosocial benefits.

== Overall effect ==
Death rates from alcohol use disorders

The level of ethanol consumption that minimizes the risk of disease, injury, and death is subject to some controversy. Several studies have found a J-shaped relationship between alcohol consumption and health, meaning that risk is minimized at a certain (non-zero) consumption level, and drinking below or above this level increases risk, with the risk level of drinking a large amount of alcohol greater than the risk level of abstinence. Other studies have found a dose-response relationship, with lifetime abstention from alcohol being the optimal strategy and more consumption incurring more risk. The studies use different data sets and statistical techniques so they cannot be directly compared. Some older studies included former and occasional drinkers in the "abstainers" category, which obscures the benefits of lifetime abstention as former drinkers often are in poor health. However, the J-curve was reconfirmed by studies that took the mentioned confounders into account. Nonetheless, some authors remain suspicious that the apparent health benefits of light alcohol use are in large part due to various selection biases and competing risks. Mendelian randomization studies have been inconsistent regarding the risk curve, with three studies finding linear dose-response risks overall and two studies finding a J-shape for lipid profiles. The variance in alcohol consumption that is explained by genetics is small, requiring large sample sizes and potentially violating assumptions of the analysis.

As one reviewer noted, "Despite the wealth of observational data, it is not absolutely clear that alcohol reduces risk, because no randomized controlled trials have been performed." The National Institute on Alcohol Abuse and Alcoholism (NIAAA) announced a randomized controlled trial in 2017, but the National Institutes of Health (NIH) cancelled it in 2018 due to irregular interactions by the program staff with the alcohol industry. A trial in Spain is expected to complete in 2028.

In 2013, Norwegian psychiatrist Hans Olav Fekjær compared the situation to those of hormone replacement therapy (HRT), vitamin E, and β-carotene; similarly to alcohol, observational studies for each of these treatments showed significantly reduced risk of coronary heart disease, but initial randomized trials of these treatments failed to replicate the effect. For HRT, pooling multiple randomized control trials and stratifying the data by age and time since menopause showed the benefits were limited to treatment soon after menopause. For vitamin E, trials have shown that the benefits are limited to certain populations such as those with diabetes and a specific genotype. For β-carotene, the randomized trials have shown that β-carotene increases cardiovascular disease risk when supplemented, with all beneficial effects due to other vitamins in foods providing β-carotene.

In light of the conflicting evidence, many have cautioned against recommendations for the use of alcohol for health benefits. At a symposium in 1997, Dr. Peter Anderson of the World Health Organization (WHO) labeled such alcohol promotion as "ridiculous and dangerous". It has been argued that the health benefits from alcohol have been exaggerated by the alcohol industry, with industry participation in the wording of messages and warnings. The debate is not purely scientific, with groups such as the International Scientific Forum on Alcohol Research (ISFAR) critiquing anti-alcohol studies as distorting the evidence, scientists in turn accusing these groups of bias due to industry funding, and members of the groups responding that these are false and misleading assertions. Studies with industry funding find less risk of stroke, and industry-linked systematic reviews consistently find cardioprotective effects, compared to reviews with no associations being 54% positive.

Considered as a treatment for cardiovascular disease, alcohol is addictive, has greater risk of adverse effects, and is less effective than other interventions such as heart medications, exercise, or good nutrition.

=== The world ===
The available evidence is in agreement that current drinking levels are too high. The WHO has emphasized the need to revise alcohol control policies worldwide in order to reduce overall alcohol consumption.

Globally, assuming the J-shaped curve is correct, the age-standardised, both-sexes consumption that minimizes risk is about 5 grams of ethanol per day, and an average individual would cause themselves harm by drinking more than 17 grams per day. However, the average intake among current drinkers in 2016 was approximately 40 grams of ethanol per day. (Note: Calculated as (1.5*1.7/0.39+0.9*0.87/0.25)/(1.5+0.9), with figures from GBD 2016 Alcohol Collaboration (2018). See also WHO figures by country) 1.03 billion males (35.1% of the male population aged ≥15 years, ~2/3 of male drinkers) and 312 million females (10.5% of the female population aged ≥15 years, ~1/3 of female drinkers) consumed harmful amounts of alcohol. (Note: The fraction of current drinkers is estimated using WorldBank 2016 population numbers and combining the GBD 2016 and GBD 2020 analyses based on the statement that "Since 1990, the global proportion of drinkers consuming alcohol in excess of the NDE has not changed significantly." For example, GBD 2016 states there were 1.5 billion male current drinkers in 2016, WorldBank states there were 3,770,341,364 males and 1,018,695,045 males under 15, and we can assume based on GBD 2020 that 35.1% of males 15+ were drinking harmful amounts, so we calculate .351*(3770341364-1018695045)/1.5e9≈2/3) The proportion of the population consuming harmful amounts of alcohol has stayed at approximately the same level over the past three decades.

Estimates of the worldwide number of deaths per year caused by alcohol vary. The 2016 Global Burden of Disease (GBD) study estimated 2.8 million, while the 2020 GBD study estimated 1.78 million. The WHO estimates 3 million deaths per year from harmful use of alcohol, representing 5.3% of all deaths across the globe. All of these numbers are net deaths, subtracting deaths prevented from deaths caused. Professor Tim Stockwell, former director of the Canadian Institute for Substance Use Research argues that alcohol may not prevent any deaths and guesses that as many as 6 million deaths may be caused by alcohol. Besides this, the WHO attributes 5.1% of the global burden of disease and injury to alcohol, as measured in disability-adjusted life years (DALYs). The WHO does not list alcohol in its 2019 list of the top 20 leading causes of DALYs, but alcohol use disorder (AUD) would rank around #39, combining AUD with alcohol-related cirrhosis and liver cancer would rank between malaria (#19) and refractive errors (#20), and all alcohol-attributed DALYs would rank between stroke (#3) and lower respiratory infections (#4). Similarly the number of alcohol-attributed deaths would rank between chronic obstructive pulmonary disease (#3) and lower respiratory infections (#4).

Research of Western cultures has consistently shown increased survival associated with light to moderate alcohol consumption. Australasia and Europe are also the locations with the highest levels of harmful alcohol consumption. Researchers have investigated cultures with different alcohol consumption norms and found conflicting results.

The risks of alcohol consumption are age-dependent. Risk is greatest among males aged 15–39 years, due to binge drinking which may result in violence or traffic accidents. It is less risky and potentially more beneficial for an older individual to consume a given amount of alcohol, compared to a similar younger individual, as they are less likely to develop cancer during their remaining lifespan, less likely to be involved in accidents, and more likely to benefit from alcohol's cardiovascular effects. Taking the lower bound of the confidence intervals, the GBD 2020 study suggests that people do not need to drink until age 25, and in many regions, the study did not find any significant benefit for drinking over abstinence even as late as ages 45 or 60. Other studies have found similar patterns.

=== India ===
A study of 4,465 subjects in India confirmed the association of alcohol consumption with coronary risk in men. Compared to lifetime abstainers, alcohol users had higher blood sugar (2 mg/dl), blood pressure (2 mm Hg) levels, and high-density lipoprotein cholesterol (HDL-C) levels (2 mg/dl) and significantly higher tobacco use (63% vs. 21%). Indians who consume alcohol had a 60% higher risk of heart attack, which was greater with local spirits (80%) than branded spirits (50%). The harm was observed in alcohol users classified as occasional as well as regular light, moderate, and heavy consumers. Five percent of all cancers diagnosed in Indians in 2021 were attributed to alcohol consumption, with cancers of the esophagus, liver, and breast accounting for the most number of cases.

=== Russia ===
As of 2014, male life expectancy was lower in Russia than other countries. For example, at 2005 mortality rates, only 7% of UK men but 37% of Russian men would die before the age of 55 years. A study by Zaridze et al. in 2009 found that "excessive alcohol consumption in Russia, particularly by men, has in recent years caused more than half of all the deaths at ages 15–54 years." The study used 43,802 deaths linked to alcohol or tobacco but only 5475 other deaths as controls. Further studies have confirmed that heavy drinking and smoking are the main cause of high death rates in Russia as of 2014. The high consumption of vodka in the context of binge drinking is a significant factor. For smokers aged 35-54, the 20-year risk of death was 35% for men who had reported drinking three or more bottles of vodka a week and 16% for men who had reported consuming less than one bottle a week.

=== South Asia ===
The landmark INTERHEART Study has revealed that alcohol consumption in South Asians was not protective against Acute Myocardial Infarction (AMI).

=== United Kingdom ===
A governmental report from Britain has found that there were "8,724 alcohol-related deaths in 2007, lower than 2006, but more than double the 4,144 recorded in 1991. The alcohol-related death rate was 13.3 per 100,000 population in 2007, compared with 6.9 per 100,000 population in 1991." In Scotland, the NHS estimate that in 2003 one in every 20 deaths could be attributed to alcohol. A 2009 report noted that the death rate from alcohol-related disease was 9,000, a number three times that of 25 years previously.

A UK report came to the result that the effects of low-to-moderate alcohol consumption on mortality are age-dependent. Low-to-moderate alcohol use increases the risk of death for individuals aged 16–34 (due to increased risk of cancers, accidents, liver disease, and other factors), but decreases the risk of death for individuals ages 55+ (due to decreased risk of ischemic heart disease).

A study in the United Kingdom found that alcohol causes about 4% of cancer cases in the UK (12,500 cases per year).

=== United States ===
Excessive alcohol use was the third leading behavioral cause of death for people in the United States in the year 2000. In 2001, an estimated 75,766 deaths were attributable to alcohol. From 2006 through 2010, there were approximately 87,798 deaths on average attributable to alcohol occurred in the United States each year. Alcohol-related deaths among Americans about doubled from 1999 to 2020. In 2020, alcohol was linked to nearly 50,000 deaths among adults aged 25 to 85, a sharp rise from just under 20,000 in 1999. All age groups experienced increases, with the most significant rise occurring in individuals aged 25 to 34, where death rates nearly quadrupled during this period. In 2025, the US Surgeon General advocated for cancer risk warnings on alcoholic beverages.

== Cardiovascular system ==
Alcohol has been found to have anticoagulant properties. Thrombosis is lower among moderate drinkers than abstainers. A meta-analysis of randomized trials found that alcohol consumption in moderation decreases serum levels of fibrinogen, a protein that promotes clot formation, while it increases levels of tissue type plasminogen activator, an enzyme that helps dissolve clots. These changes were estimated to reduce coronary heart disease risk by about 24%. Another meta-analysis in 2011 found favorable changes in HDL cholesterol, adiponectin, and fibrinogen associated with moderate alcohol consumption. A systematic review based on 16,351 participants showed J-shaped curve for the overall relationship between cardiovascular mortality and alcohol intake. Maximal protective effect was shown with 5–10 g of alcohol consumption per day and the effect was significant up to 26 g/day of alcohol consumption. Serum levels of C-reactive protein (CRP), a putative marker of inflammation and predictor of CHD (coronary heart disease) risk, are lower in moderate drinkers than in those who abstain from alcohol, suggesting that alcohol consumption in moderation might have anti-inflammatory effects. Data from one prospective study suggest that, among men with initially low alcohol consumption (</=1 drink per week), a subsequent moderate increase in alcohol consumption may lower their CVD risk.

=== Peripheral arterial disease ===
A prospective study published in 1997 found "moderate alcohol consumption appears to decrease the risk of PAD in apparently healthy men." In a large population-based study, moderate alcohol consumption was inversely associated with peripheral arterial disease in women but not in men. But when confounding by smoking was considered, the benefit extended to men. The study concluded "an inverse association between alcohol consumption and peripheral arterial disease was found in nonsmoking men and women."

=== Intermittent claudication ===
A study found that moderate consumption of alcohol had a protective effect against intermittent claudication. The lowest risk was seen in men who drank 1 to 2 drinks per day and in women who drank half to 1 drink per day.

=== Heart attack and stroke ===
Drinking in moderation has been found to help those who have had a heart attack survive it. However, excessive alcohol consumption leads to an increased risk of heart failure. At present there have been no randomised trials to confirm the evidence which suggests a protective role of low doses of alcohol against heart attacks. There is an increased risk of hypertriglyceridemia, cardiomyopathy, hypertension, and stroke if three or more standard drinks of alcohol are taken per day. A systematic review reported that reducing alcohol intake lowers blood pressure in a dose-dependent manner in heavy drinkers. There is no safe amount of alcohol without having a negative effect on blood pressure. Even individuals who consume only one drink per day show a link to higher blood pressure.

Frequent drinking of alcoholic beverages is a major contributing factor in cases of elevated blood levels of triglycerides.

=== Cardiomyopathy ===
Large amounts of alcohol over the long term can lead to alcoholic cardiomyopathy. Alcoholic cardiomyopathy presents in a manner clinically identical to idiopathic dilated cardiomyopathy, involving hypertrophy of the musculature of the heart that can lead to congestive heart failure.

=== Hematologic diseases ===
Alcoholics may have anemia from several causes; they may also develop thrombocytopenia from a direct toxic effect on megakaryocytes or from hypersplenism.

=== Atrial fibrillation ===
Alcohol consumption increases the risk of atrial fibrillation, a type of abnormal heart rhythm that increases the risk of stroke and heart failure. This remains true even at moderate levels of consumption.

== Nervous system ==
Chronic heavy alcohol consumption impairs brain development, causes alcohol-related dementia, brain shrinkage, physical dependence, alcoholic polyneuropathy (also known as 'alcohol leg'), increases neuropsychiatric and cognitive disorders and causes distortion of the brain chemistry. At present, due to poor study design and methodology, the literature is inconclusive on whether moderate alcohol consumption increases the risk of dementia or decreases it. Evidence for a protective effect of low to moderate alcohol consumption on age-related cognitive decline and dementia has been suggested by some research; however, other research has not found a protective effect of low to moderate alcohol consumption. Some evidence suggests that low to moderate alcohol consumption may speed up brain volume loss. Chronic consumption of alcohol may result in increased plasma levels of the toxic amino acid homocysteine; which may explain alcohol withdrawal seizures, alcohol-induced brain atrophy and alcohol-related cognitive disturbances. Alcohol's impact on the nervous system can also include disruptions of memory and learning (see Effects of alcohol on memory), such as resulting in a blackout phenomenon.

=== Strokes ===
Epidemiological studies of middle-aged populations generally find the relationship between alcohol intake and the risk of stroke to be either U- or J-shaped. There may be very different effects of alcohol based on the type of stroke studied. The predominant form of stroke in Western cultures is ischemic, whereas non-western cultures have more hemorrhagic stroke. In contrast to the beneficial effect of alcohol on ischemic stroke, consumption of more than two drinks per day increases the risk of hemorrhagic stroke. The National Stroke Association estimates this higher amount of alcohol increases stroke risk by 50%. "For stroke, the observed relationship between alcohol consumption and risk in a given population depends on the proportion of strokes that are hemorrhagic. Light-to-moderate alcohol intake is associated with a lower risk of ischemic stroke which is likely to be, in part, causal. Hemorrhagic stroke, on the other hand, displays a log-linear relationship with alcohol intake."

=== Brain ===
Alcohol misuse is associated with widespread and significant brain lesions. Alcohol related brain damage is not only due to the direct toxic effects of alcohol; alcohol withdrawal, nutritional deficiency, electrolyte disturbances, and liver damage are also believed to contribute to alcohol-related brain damage.

Alcohol can cause brain damage, Wernicke's encephalopathy and alcoholic Korsakoff syndrome which frequently occur simultaneously, known as Wernicke–Korsakoff syndrome. Lesions, or brain abnormalities, are typically located in the diencephalon which result in anterograde and retrograde amnesia, or memory loss.

=== Cognition and dementia ===
Excessive alcohol intake is associated with impaired prospective memory. This impaired cognitive ability leads to increased failure to carry out an intended task at a later date, for example, forgetting to lock the door or to post a letter on time. The higher the volume of alcohol consumed and the longer consumed, the more severe the impairments. One of the organs most sensitive to the toxic effects of chronic alcohol consumption is the brain. In the United States, approximately 20% of admissions to mental health facilities are related to alcohol-related cognitive impairment, most notably alcohol-related dementia. Chronic excessive alcohol intake is also associated with serious cognitive decline and a range of neuropsychiatric complications. The elderly are the most sensitive to the toxic effects of alcohol on the brain. There is some inconclusive evidence that small amounts of alcohol taken in earlier adult life is protective in later life against cognitive decline and dementia. However, a study concluded, "Our findings suggest that, despite previous suggestions, moderate alcohol consumption does not protect older people from cognitive decline."

Wernicke–Korsakoff syndrome is a manifestation of thiamine deficiency, usually as a secondary effect of alcohol misuse. The syndrome is a combined manifestation of two eponymous disorders, Korsakoff's psychosis and Wernicke's encephalopathy. Wernicke's encephalopathy is the acute presentation of the syndrome and is characterised by a confusional state while Korsakoff's psychosis main symptoms are amnesia and executive dysfunction. "Banana bags", intravenous fluid containers containing vitamins and minerals (bright yellow due to the vitamins), can be used to mitigate these outcomes.

=== Essential tremor ===
Essential tremors—or, in the case of essential tremors on a background of family history of essential tremors, familial tremors—can be temporarily relieved in up to two-thirds of patients by drinking small amounts of alcohol.

Ethanol is known to activate aminobutyric acid type A (GABAA) and inhibit N-methyl-D-aspartate (NMDA) glutamate receptors, which are both implicated in essential tremor pathology and could underlie the ameliorative effects. Additionally, the effects of ethanol have been studied in different animal essential tremor models. (For more details on this topic, see Essential tremor).

=== Sleep ===
Chronic use of alcohol used to induce sleep can lead to insomnia: frequent moving between sleep stages occurs, with awakenings due to headaches and diaphoresis. Stopping chronic alcohol misuse can also lead to profound disturbances of sleep with vivid dreams. Chronic alcohol misuse is associated with NREM stage 3 and 4 sleep as well as suppression of REM sleep and REM sleep fragmentation. During withdrawal REM sleep is typically exaggerated as part of a rebound effect.

=== Mental health effects ===
High rates of major depressive disorder occur in heavy drinkers. Whether it is more true that major depressive disorder causes self-medicating alcohol use, or the increased incidence of the disorder in people with an alcohol use disorder is caused by the drinking, is not known, though some evidence suggests drinking causes the disorder. Alcohol misuse is associated with a number of mental health disorders, and alcoholics have a very high suicide rate. A study of people hospitalized for suicide attempts found that those who were alcoholics were 75 times more likely to go on to successfully commit suicide than non-alcoholic suicide attempts. In the general alcoholic population the increased risk of suicide compared to the general public is 5–20 times greater. About 15 percent of alcoholics commit suicide, the most common methods being overdosing and cutting/scratching. There are high rates of suicide attempts, self-harm, suicidal ideation, and self-harm ideation in people with substance dependence who have been hospitalized. Use of other illicit drugs is also associated with an increased risk of suicide. About 33 percent of suicides in the under 35s are correlated with alcohol or other substance misuse.

Social skills are significantly impaired in people that have alcoholism due to the neurotoxic effects of alcohol on the brain, especially the prefrontal cortex area of the brain. The social skills that are impaired by alcohol use disorder include impairments in perceiving facial emotions, prosody perception problems and theory of mind deficits; the ability to understand humor is also impaired in people with an alcohol use disorder.

Studies have shown that alcohol dependence relates directly to cravings and irritability. Another study has shown that alcohol use is a significant predisposing factor towards antisocial behavior in children. Depression, anxiety and panic disorder are disorders commonly reported by alcohol dependent people. Alcoholism is associated with dampened activation in brain networks responsible for emotional processing (e.g. the amygdala and hippocampus). Evidence that the mental health disorders are often induced by alcohol misuse via distortion of brain neurochemistry is indicated by the improvement or disappearance of symptoms that occurs after prolonged abstinence, although problems may worsen in early withdrawal and recovery periods. Psychosis is secondary to several alcohol-related conditions including acute intoxication and withdrawal after significant exposure. Chronic alcohol misuse can cause psychotic type symptoms to develop, more so than with other illicit substances. Alcohol misuse has been shown to cause an 800% increased risk of psychotic disorders in men and a 300% increased risk of psychotic disorders in women which are not related to pre-existing psychiatric disorders. This is significantly higher than the increased risk of psychotic disorders seen from cannabis use making alcohol misuse a very significant cause of psychotic disorders. Approximately 3 percent of people who are alcohol dependent experience psychosis during acute intoxication or withdrawal. Alcohol-related psychosis may manifest itself through a kindling mechanism. The mechanism of alcohol-related psychosis is due to distortions to neuronal membranes, gene expression, as well as thiamin deficiency. It is possible in some cases that excessive alcohol use, via a kindling mechanism, can cause the development of a chronic substance-induced psychotic disorder, i.e., schizophrenia. The effects of an alcohol-related psychosis include an increased risk of depression and suicide as well as psychosocial impairments. However, moderate wine drinking has been shown to lower the risk for depression.

While alcohol initially helps social phobia or panic symptoms, with longer term alcohol misuse can often worsen social phobia symptoms and can cause panic disorder to develop or worsen, during alcohol intoxication and especially during the alcohol withdrawal syndrome. This effect is not unique to alcohol but can also occur with long-term use of drugs which have a similar mechanism of action to alcohol such as the benzodiazepines, which are sometimes prescribed as tranquilizers to people with alcohol problems. Approximately half of patients attending mental health services for conditions including anxiety disorders such as panic disorder or social phobia have alcohol or benzodiazepine dependence. It was noted that every individual has an individual sensitivity level to alcohol or sedative hypnotic drugs and what one person can tolerate without ill health another will have very ill health and that even moderate drinking can cause rebound anxiety syndromes and sleep disorders. A person who is experiencing the toxic effects of alcohol will not benefit from other therapies or medications as they do not address the root cause of the symptoms.

Addiction to alcohol, as with any addictive substance tested so far, has been correlated with an enduring reduction in the expression of GLT1 (EAAT2) in the nucleus accumbens and is implicated in the drug-seeking behavior expressed nearly universally across all documented addiction syndromes. This long-term dysregulation of glutamate transmission is associated with an increase in vulnerability to both relapse-events after re-exposure to drug-use triggers as well as an overall increase in the likelihood of developing addiction to other reinforcing drugs. Drugs which help to re-stabilize the glutamate system such as N-acetylcysteine have been proposed for the treatment of addiction to cocaine, nicotine, and alcohol.

The effect on depression and returning to drinking among individuals with alcohol dependence has always been controversial. Studies show that after doing a study on men and women hospitalized for alcohol dependence the likelihood of returning to drinking with depression is extremely high. A diagnosis of major depression at entry into an inpatient treatment for alcohol dependence showed shorter times to first drink and also relapse in both women and men.

== Digestive system and weight gain ==
Alcohol use increases the risk of chronic gastritis (stomach inflammation); it is one cause of cirrhosis, hepatitis, and pancreatitis in both its chronic and acute forms.

=== Weight ===
The impact of alcohol on weight gain is contentious: some studies find no effect, others find decreased or increased effect on weight gain. Findings are inconclusive because alcohol itself contains seven calories per gram, but research suggests that the body only extracts 70-80 percent of this due to thermogenesis, thus the approximate number of calories that can be utilized is between 5 and 6 calories per gram of alcohol.

According to Cambridge University review, the research results do not necessarily mean that people who wish to lose weight should continue to consume alcohol because the review “suggests that adults do not compensate appropriately for alcohol energy by eating less, and a relatively modest alcohol dose may lead to an increase in food consumption.” Due to these discrepancies in findings, the relationship between alcohol and weight remains unresolved and requires further research.

Biological and environmental factors are thought to contribute to alcoholism and obesity. The physiologic commonalities between excessive eating and excessive alcohol drinking shed light on intervention strategies, such as pharmaceutical compounds that may help those who suffer from both. Some of the brain signaling proteins that mediate excessive eating and weight gain also mediate uncontrolled alcohol consumption. Some physiological substrates that underlie food and alcohol intake have been identified. Melanocortins, a group of signaling proteins, are found to be involved in both excessive food intake and alcohol intake.

Certain patterns of alcohol use may contribute to obesity. A study found frequent, light drinkers (three to seven drinking days per week, one drink per drinking day) had lower BMIs than infrequent, but heavier drinkers. Although calories in liquids containing ethanol may fail to trigger the physiologic mechanism that produces the feeling of fullness in the short term, long-term, frequent drinkers may compensate for energy derived from ethanol by eating less.

=== Metabolic syndrome ===
A national survey (NHANES) conducted in the U.S. concluded, "Mild to moderate alcohol consumption is associated with a lower prevalence of the metabolic syndrome, with a favorable influence on lipids, waist circumference, and fasting insulin. This association was strongest among whites and among beer and wine drinkers." Similarly, a national survey conducted in Korea reported a J-curve association between alcohol intake and metabolic syndrome: "The results of the present study suggest that the metabolic syndrome is negatively associated with light alcohol consumption (1–15 g alcohol/d) in Korean adults," but risk increased at higher alcohol consumption.

=== Gallbladder effects ===
Research has found that drinking reduces the risk of developing gallstones. Compared with alcohol abstainers, the relative risk of gallstone disease, controlling for age, sex, education, smoking, and body mass index, is 0.83 for occasional and regular moderate drinkers (< 25 ml of ethanol per day), 0.67 for intermediate drinkers (25-50 ml per day), and 0.58 for heavy drinkers. This inverse association was consistent across strata of age, sex, and body mass index." Frequency of drinking also appears to be a factor. "An increase in frequency of alcohol consumption also was related to decreased risk. Combining the reports of quantity and frequency of alcohol intake, a consumption pattern that reflected frequent intake (5–7 days/week) of any given amount of alcohol was associated with a decreased risk, as compared with nondrinkers. In contrast, infrequent alcohol intake (1–2 days/week) showed no significant association with risk."

A large self-reported study published in 1998 found no correlation between gallbladder disease and multiple factors including smoking, alcohol consumption, hypertension, and coffee consumption. A retrospective study from 1997 found vitamin C (ascorbic acid) supplement use in drinkers was associated with a lower prevalence of gallbladder disease, but this association was not seen in non-drinkers.

=== Liver disease ===
During the metabolism of alcohol via the respective dehydrogenases, nicotinamide adenine dinucleotide (NAD) is converted into reduced NAD. Normally, NAD is used to metabolize fats in the liver, and as such alcohol competes with these fats for the use of NAD. Prolonged exposure to alcohol means that fats accumulate in the liver, leading to the term 'fatty liver'. Continued consumption (such as in alcohol use disorder) then leads to cell death in the hepatocytes as the fat stores reduce the function of the cell to the point of death. These cells are then replaced with scar tissue, leading to the condition called cirrhosis.

Alcoholic liver disease is a major public health problem. For example, in the United States up to two million people have alcohol-related liver disorders. Chronic heavy alcohol consumption can cause fatty liver, cirrhosis, and alcoholic hepatitis. Treatment options are limited and consist of most importantly discontinuing alcohol consumption. In cases of severe liver disease, the only treatment option may be a liver transplant from alcohol abstinent donors. Research is being conducted into the effectiveness of anti-TNFs. Certain complementary medications, e.g., milk thistle and silymarin, appear to offer some benefit. Alcohol is a leading cause of liver cancer in the Western world, accounting for 32-45% of hepatic cancers. Up to half a million people in the United States develop alcohol-related liver cancer.

=== Pancreatitis ===
Alcohol misuse is a leading cause of both acute pancreatitis and chronic pancreatitis. Alcoholic pancreatitis can result in severe abdominal pain and may progress to pancreatic cancer. Chronic pancreatitis often results in intestinal malabsorption, and can result in diabetes.

=== Body composition ===
Alcohol affects the nutritional state of chronic drinkers. It can decrease food consumption and lead to malabsorption. It can also create imbalances in skeletal muscle mass and cause muscle wasting. Chronic consumption of alcohol can also increase the breakdown of important proteins in the body which can affect gene expression.

== Oral and dental implications ==
=== Oral cancer ===
The consumption of alcohol alone is not associated with an increased risk of oral squamous cell carcinoma (OSCC); however, the synergistic consumption of alcohol and tobacco is positively associated with the occurrence of (OSCC), and significantly increases an individual's risk. Studies confirm that alcohol dissolves the lipid component of epithelium and increases the permeability, amplifying the toxicity of carcinogenic components of tobacco. Limiting the overall consumption of the two has shown to reduce the risk of OSCC by three-fourth. The knowledge provided is useful for better understanding the differences in the effect of the combined consumption of alcohol and tobacco, in the development of OSCC.

Alcohol consumption has frequently been associated with an increased risk of oral cancer in current literature. Studies have found that people that consume alcohol were two times more likely to develop oral cancer in comparison to people who did not. The mechanisms in which alcohol acts as a carcinogen within the oral cavity are currently not fully understood. It is thought to be a multifactorial disease which then gives rise to a cancerous lesion. Many theories have become apparent in research, including alcohol being responsible for high estrogen and androgen levels, specifically in women, which may facilitate the alcohol-related immunodeficiency and/or immunosuppression that causes carcinogenesis. Therefore, immediate cessation of the habit of alcohol consumption can aid in decreasing the risk of oral cancer.

Alcohol-based mouthwashes used to be very common and can still be purchased for use today. Correlation in the presence of alcohol in mouthwashes with development of oral and pharyngeal cancer is unknown due to lack of evidence. However, it has been suggested that acetaldehyde, the first metabolite of ethanol, plays a role in the carcinogenesis of alcohol in oral cancer. Acetaldehyde, has been found to increase when in the salivary medium after an alcoholic beverage has been consumed and could possibly occur with alcohol-based mouthwashes as well, posing as a possible risk factor for oral cancer. However, more research must be conducted regarding these theories.

=== Periodontitis ===
Alcohol consumption is associated with a higher risk of periodontitis, an inflammatory disease of the gums around the teeth. There was also found to be a dose-response relationship in which the risk of periodontitis increased by 0.4% for each additional gram of daily alcohol consumption. Mechanisms explaining the relationship between the two are still unclear; however, several explanations have been suggested. One explanation is the weakening of neutrophil activity by alcohol consumption which potentially leads to bacterial overgrowth and increases bacterial penetration subsequently leading to periodontal inflammation and periodontal disease. Characteristics of the disease include shrinkage of gingival height and increased mobility of teeth which may exfoliate if the disease continues to progress. A patient's consumption of alcohol needs to be monitored to estimate the risk of periodontitis, but further well-designed cohort studies are needed to reaffirm theses results.

== Other systems ==
=== Respiratory system ===
Chronic alcohol ingestion can impair multiple critical cellular functions in the lungs. These cellular impairments can lead to increased susceptibility to serious complications from lung disease. Recent research cites alcoholic lung disease as comparable to liver disease in alcohol-related mortality. Alcoholics have a higher risk of developing acute respiratory distress syndrome (ARDS) and experience higher rates of mortality from ARDS when compared to non-alcoholics. In contrast to these findings, a large prospective study has shown a protective effect of moderate alcohol consumption on respiratory mortality.

=== Kidney stones ===
Research indicates that drinking beer or wine is associated with a lower risk of developing kidney stones.

=== Sexual function in men ===
Low to moderate alcohol consumption is shown to have protective effect for men's erectile function. Several reviews and meta-analyses of existing literature show that low to moderate alcohol consumption significantly decrease erectile dysfunction risk.

Men's sexual behaviors can be affected dramatically by high alcohol consumption. Both chronic and acute alcohol consumption have been shown in most studies (but not all) to inhibit testosterone production in the testes. This is believed to be caused by the metabolism of alcohol reducing the NAD^{+}/NADH ratio both in the liver and the testes; since the synthesis of testosterone requires NAD^{+}, this tends to reduce testosterone production.

Long term excessive intake of alcohol can lead to damage to the central nervous system and the peripheral nervous system resulting in loss of sexual desire and impotence in men. This is caused by reduction of testosterone from ethanol-induced testicular atrophy, resulting in increased feminisation of males and is a clinical feature of alcohol abusing males who have cirrhosis of the liver.

=== Hormonal imbalance ===
Excessive alcohol intake can result in hyperoestrogenisation. It has been speculated that alcoholic beverages may contain estrogen-like compounds. In men, high levels of estrogen can lead to testicular failure and the development of feminine traits including development of male breasts, called gynecomastia. In women, increased levels of estrogen due to excessive alcohol intake have been related to an increased risk of breast cancer.

=== Increased cortisol ===
Alcohol and cortisol have a complex relationship. While cortisol is a stress hormone, alcoholism can lead to increased cortisol levels in the body over time. This can be problematic because cortisol can temporarily shut down other bodily functions, potentially causing physical damage.

=== Diabetes mellitus ===
A meta-analysis determined the dose-response relationships by sex and end point using lifetime abstainers as the reference group. A U-shaped relationship was found for both sexes. Compared with lifetime abstainers, the relative risk (RR) for type 2 diabetes among men was most protective when consuming 22 g/day alcohol and became deleterious at just over 60 g/day alcohol. Among women, consumption of 24 g/day alcohol was most protective, and became deleterious at about 50 g/day alcohol. A systematic review on intervention studies in women also supported this finding. It reported that alcohol consumption in moderation improved insulin sensitivity among women.

The way in which alcohol is consumed (i.e., with meals or binge drinking) affects various health outcomes. It may be the case that the risk of diabetes associated with heavy alcohol consumption is due to consumption mainly on the weekend as opposed to the same amount spread over a week. In the United Kingdom "advice on weekly consumption is avoided". A twenty-year twin study from Finland reported that moderate alcohol consumption may reduce the risk of type 2 diabetes in men and women. However, binge drinking and high alcohol consumption was found to increase the risk of type 2 diabetes in women.

=== Rheumatoid arthritis ===
Regular consumption of alcohol is associated with an increased risk of gouty arthritis and a decreased risk of rheumatoid arthritis. Two recent studies report that the more alcohol consumed, the lower the risk of developing rheumatoid arthritis. Among those who drank regularly, the one-quarter who drank the most were up to 50% less likely to develop the disease compared to the half who drank the least.

The researchers noted that moderate alcohol consumption also reduces the risk of other inflammatory processes such as cardiovascular disease. Some of the biological mechanisms by which ethanol reduces the risk of destructive arthritis and prevents the loss of bone mineral density (BMD), which is part of the disease process.

A study concluded, "Alcohol either protects from RA or, subjects with RA curtail their drinking after the manifestation of RA". Another study found, "Postmenopausal women who averaged more than 14 alcoholic drinks per week had a reduced risk of rheumatoid arthritis..."

=== Osteoporosis ===
Moderate alcohol consumption is associated with higher bone mineral density in postmenopausal women. "...Alcohol consumption significantly decreased the likelihood [of osteoporosis]." "Moderate alcohol intake was associated with higher BMD in postmenopausal elderly women." "Social drinking is associated with higher bone mineral density in men and women [over 45]." However, heavy alcohol use is associated with bone loss.

=== Skin ===
Chronic excessive alcohol use is associated with a wide range of skin disorders including urticaria, porphyria cutanea tarda, flushing, cutaneous stigmata of cirrhosis, psoriasis, pruritus, seborrheic dermatitis, and rosacea.

A 2010 study concluded, "Nonlight beer intake is associated with an increased risk of developing psoriasis among women. Other alcoholic beverages did not increase the risk of psoriasis in this study."

== Immune system ==
=== Bacterial infection ===
Excessive alcohol consumption seen in people with an alcohol use disorder is a known risk factor for developing pneumonia.

=== Common cold ===
A study on the common cold found that "Greater numbers of alcoholic drinks (up to three or four per day) were associated with decreased risk for developing colds because drinking was associated with decreased illness following infection. However, the benefits of drinking occurred only among nonsmokers. ... Although alcohol consumption did not influence risk of clinical illness for smokers, moderate alcohol consumption was associated with decreased risk for nonsmokers."

Another study concluded, "Findings suggest that wine intake, especially red wine, may have a protective effect against common cold. Beer, spirits, and total alcohol intakes do not seem to affect the incidence of common cold."

== Cancer ==
In 1988, the International Agency for Research on Cancer (Centre International de Recherche sur le Cancer) of the World Health Organization classified alcohol as a Group 1 carcinogen, stating "There is sufficient evidence for the carcinogenicity of alcoholic beverages in humans.... Alcoholic beverages are carcinogenic to humans (Group 1)." The U.S. Department of Health & Human Services' National Toxicology Program in 2000 listed alcohol as a known carcinogen.

It was estimated in 2006 that "3.6% of all cancer cases worldwide are related to alcohol drinking, resulting in 3.5% of all cancer deaths." A European study from 2011 found that one in 10 of all cancers in men and one in 33 in women were caused by past or current alcohol intake. The World Cancer Research Fund panel report Food, Nutrition, Physical Activity and the Prevention of Cancer: a Global Perspective finds the evidence "convincing" that alcoholic drinks increase the risk of the following cancers: mouth, pharynx and larynx, oesophagus, colorectum (men), breast (pre- and postmenopause).

Even light and moderate alcohol consumption increases cancer risk in individuals, especially with respect to squamous cell carcinoma of the esophagus, oropharyngeal cancer, and breast cancer.

Acetaldehyde is the major metabolite when one drinks alcohol, produced in the liver, and it is known to be carcinogenic. It is suspected that this metabolite is the main reason alcohol promotes cancer. Typically the liver eliminates 99% of acetaldehyde produced. However, liver disease and certain genetic enzyme deficiencies result in high acetaldehyde levels. Heavy drinkers who are exposed to high acetaldehyde levels due to a genetic defect in alcohol dehydrogenase have been found to be at greater risk of developing cancers of the upper gastrointestinal tract and liver. A review in 2007 found "convincing evidence that acetaldehyde... is responsible for the carcinogenic effect of ethanol... owing to its multiple mutagenic effects on DNA." Acetaldehyde can react with DNA to create DNA adducts including the Cr-PdG adduct. This Cr-PdG adduct "is likely to play a central role in the mechanism of alcoholic beverage related carcinogenesis."

== Alcohol's effect on the fetus ==
Fetal alcohol syndrome or FAS is a birth defect that occurs in the offspring of women who drink alcohol during pregnancy. More risks than benefits according to a survey of current knowledge. Alcohol crosses the placental barrier and can stunt fetal growth or weight, create distinctive facial stigmata, damaged neurons and brain structures, and cause other physical, mental, or behavioural problems. Fetal alcohol exposure is the leading known cause of intellectual disability in the Western world. Alcohol consumption during pregnancy is associated with brain insulin and insulin-like growth factor resistance.

== Effects of alcoholism on family and children ==
Children raised in alcoholic families have the potential to suffer emotional distress as they move into their own committed relationships. These children are at a higher risk for divorce and separation, unstable marital conditions and fractured families. Feelings of depression and antisocial behaviors experienced in early childhood frequently contribute to marital conflict and domestic violence. Women are more likely than men to be victims of alcohol-related domestic violence.

Children of alcoholics often incorporate behaviors learned as children into their marital relationships. These behaviors lead to poor parenting practices. For example, adult children of alcoholics may simultaneously express love and rejection toward a child or spouse. This is known as insecure attachment. Insecure attachment contributes to trust and bonding issues with intimate partners and offspring. In addition, prior parental emotional unavailability contributes to poor conflict resolution skills in adult relationships. Evidence shows a correlation between alcoholic fathers who display harsh and ineffective parenting practices with adolescent and adult alcohol dependence.

Children of alcoholics are often unable to trust other adults due to fear of abandonment. Further, because children learn their bonding behaviors from watching their parents' interactions, daughters of alcoholic fathers may be unable to interact appropriately with men when they reach adulthood. Poor behavior modeling by alcoholic parents contributes to inadequate understanding of how to engage in opposite gender interactions.

Sons of alcoholics are at risk for poor self-regulation that is often displayed in the preschool years. This leads to blaming others for behavioral problems and difficulties with impulse control. Poor decision-making correlates to early alcohol use, especially in sons of alcoholics. Sons often demonstrate thrill-seeking behavior, harm avoidance, and exhibit a low level of frustration tolerance.

== Economic impact from long-term consumption of alcohol ==
There is currently no consistent approach to measuring the economic impact of alcohol consumption. The economic burden such as direct, indirect, and intangible cost of diseases can be estimated through cost-of-illness studies. Direct costs are estimated through prevalence and incidence studies, while indirect costs are estimated through the human capital method, the demographic method, and the friction cost method. However, it is difficult to accurately measure the economic impact due to differences in methodologies, cost items related to alcohol consumption, and measurement techniques.

Alcohol dependence has a far reaching impact on health outcomes. A study conducted in Germany in 2016 found the economic burden for those dependent on alcohol was 50% higher than those who were not. In the study, over half of the economic cost was due to lost productivity, and only 6% was due to alcohol treatment programs. The economic cost was mostly borne by individuals between 30 and 49 years old. In another study conducted with data from eight European countries, 77% of alcohol dependent patients had psychiatric and somatic co-morbidity, which in turn increased systematic healthcare and economic cost. Alcohol consumption can also affect the immune system and produce complications in people with HIV, pneumonia, and tuberculosis.

Indirect costs due to alcohol dependence are significant. The biggest indirect cost comes from lost productivity, followed by premature mortality. Men with alcohol dependence in the U.S. have lower labor force participation by 2.5%, lower earnings by 5.0%, and higher absenteeism by 0.5–1.2 days. Female binge drinkers have higher absenteeism by 0.4–0.9 days. Premature mortality is another large contributor to indirect costs of alcohol dependence. In 2004, 3.8% of global deaths were attributable to alcohol (6.3% for men and 1.1% for women). Those under 60 years old have much higher prevalence in global deaths attributable to alcohol at 5.3%.

In general, indirect costs such as premature mortality due to alcohol dependence, loss of productivity due to absenteeism and presenteeism, and cost of property damage and enforcement, far exceed the direct health care and law enforcement costs. Aggregating the economic cost from all sources, the impact can range from 0.45 to 5.44% of a country's gross domestic product (GDP). The wide range is due to inconsistency in measurement of economic burden, as researchers in some studies attributed possible positive effects from long term alcohol consumption.

== See also ==
- Alcohol and suicide
- Health benefits of quitting alcohol
- Impact of alcohol on aging
- Self-medicated effectiveness on alcohol
- Self-medication on CNS depressants (alcohol)
- Short-term effects of alcohol consumption
