= Polymeal =

Diet-based approach combatting heart disease

The Polymeal is a diet-based approach to combatting heart disease, proposed in December 2004 by Oscar Franco, a Colombian public health scientist at the University Medical Centre in Rotterdam, Netherlands. Franco and his colleagues suggest the "Polymeal" as a natural alternative to the "Polypill", a multi-drug-based strategy for reducing heart disease. The researchers used the same technique in the polypill paper: a statistical "meta-analysis" which combined the results of many previous studies. The paper, appearing in the BMJ's traditionally light-hearted Christmas issue, may be regarded as somewhat satirical, as noted in responses in the journal.

== History ==
The study claims that adherence to the polymeal diet would delay the average onset of heart attack by nine years among men and by eight years among women. Because cardiovascular disease is the #1 cause of mortality in first-world nations, this delay of heart failure would increase the average lifespan of men by six years and women by 5.5 years.

The researchers combined several food items:

- Red wine, which contains the antioxidant resveratrol, and alcohol, which some researchers think may help to reduce atherosclerosis by reducing clotting.
- Dark chocolate without dairy products
- Almonds
- Garlic
- Fish, particularly oily fish, which are sources of the Omega-3 fatty acids EPA and DHA.
- Fruits and vegetables

They suggest a person should consume, every day:

- 150 mL of red wine (about one glass)
- 100 g of dark chocolate
- 400 g of fruits and vegetables
- 2.7 g of garlic
- 68 g of almonds

as well as 118 g of fish per day four times each week.

Since the Polymeal is based on principles of combating inflammation, this diet could be extended to the following foods:

- fruits and vegetables (as the staple)
- ginger root
- potatoes
- fish (other than catfish and tilapia)
- grass-fed beef (as opposed to grain-fed)
- chicken and eggs
- herbs and spices
- olive oil
- butter (ghee)
- coconut oil
- nuts
- dark chocolate (at least 85% chocolate)
- much water
- green tea
- red wine (dry and aged)
- turmeric (Curcuma longa)

== Controversy about alcohol and health ==
Alcohol's overall effect on health is uncertain. In 2023, the World Health Organization (WHO) stated that there is currently no conclusive evidence from studies that the potential benefits of moderate alcohol consumption for cardiovascular disease and type 2 diabetes outweigh the increased cancer risk associated with these drinking levels for individual consumers.

== See also ==
- Alcohol consumption recommendations
