= Alcohol and cancer =

Relationship between cancer and the consumption of alcohol

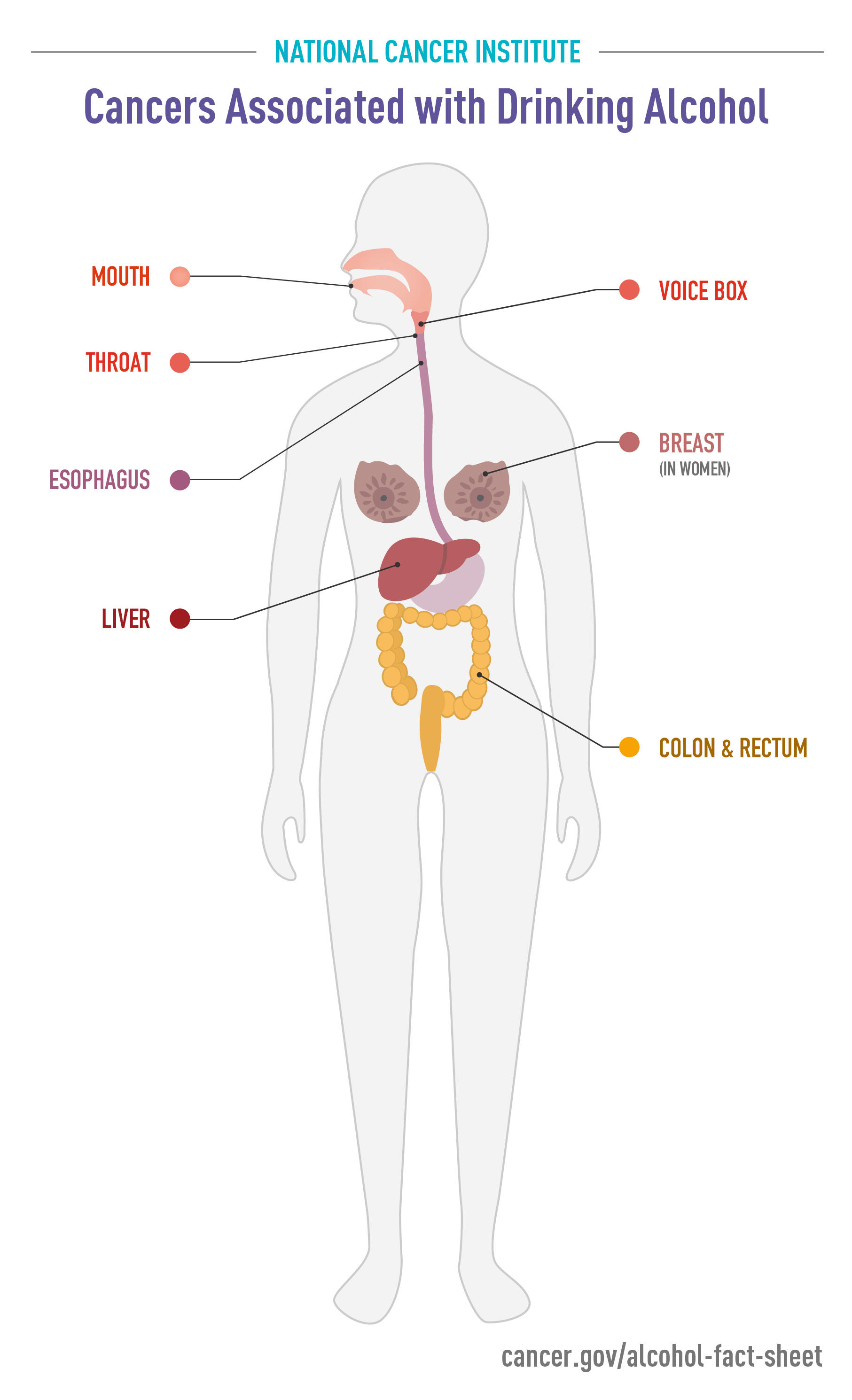

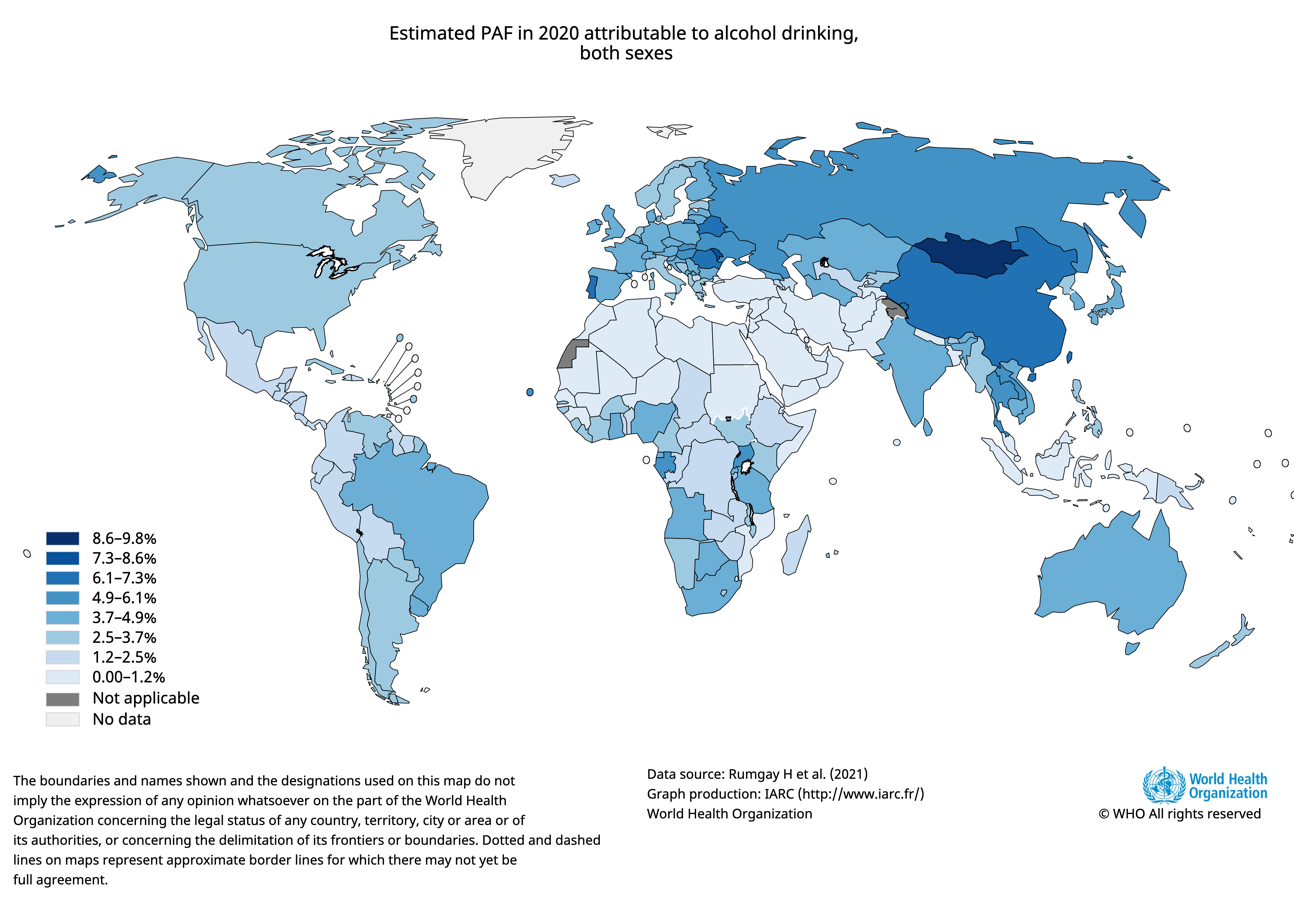
Percentage of cancer cases that were caused by drinking alcohol by country. Estimated 2020 population attributable fraction (PAF) of cancers attributable to alcohol drinking, both sexes

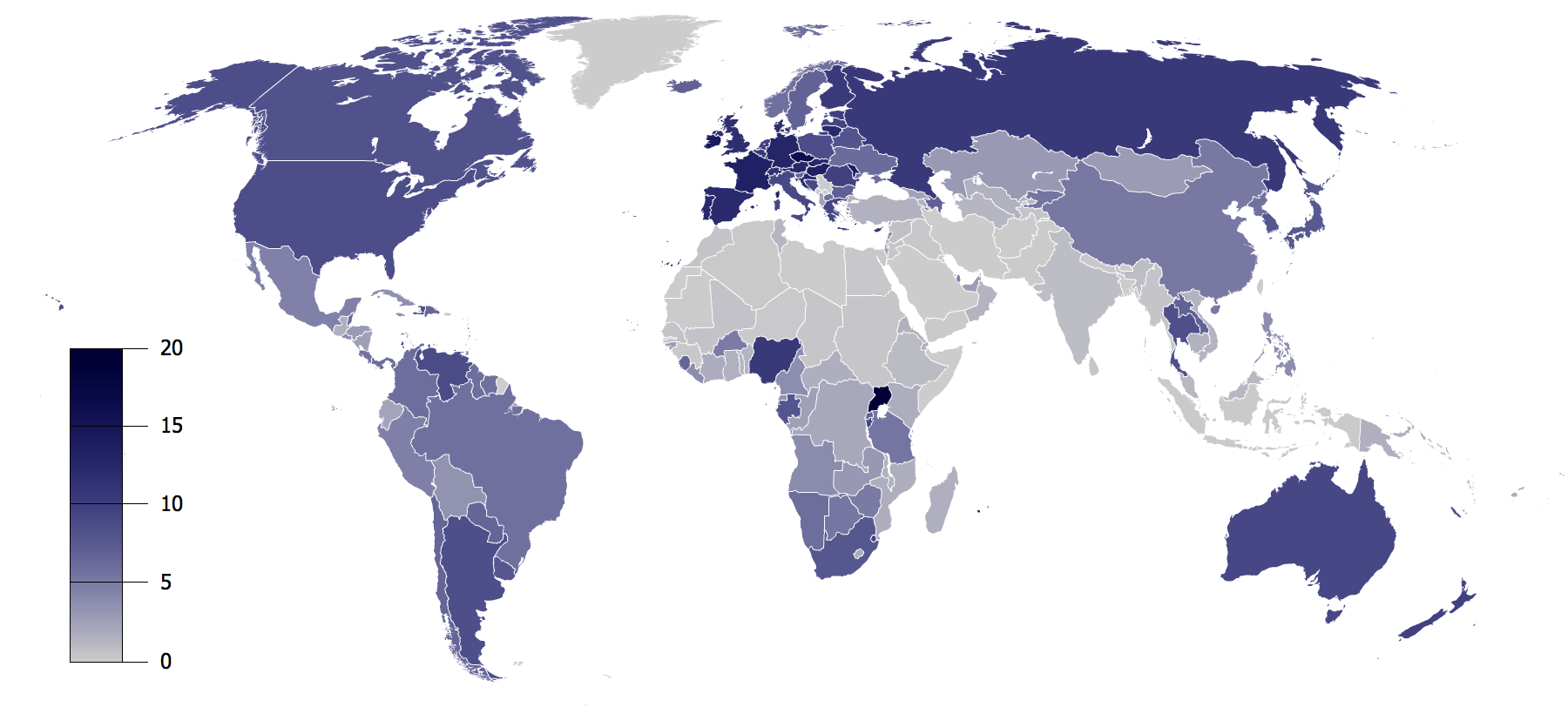
Total recorded alcohol per capita consumption (15+), in litres of pure alcohol

Alcohol and cancer have a complex relationship. Alcohol causes cancers of the oesophagus, liver, breast, colon, oral cavity, rectum, pharynx, and larynx, and probably causes cancers of the pancreas. Cancer risk can occur even with light to moderate drinking. The more alcohol is consumed, the higher the cancer risk, and no amount can be considered completely safe.

Alcoholic beverages were classified as a group 1 carcinogen by the International Agency for Research on Cancer (IARC) in 1988. An estimated 3.6% of all cancer cases and 3.5% of cancer deaths worldwide are attributable to consumption of alcohol (more specifically, acetaldehyde, a metabolic derivative of ethanol). 740,000 cases of cancer in 2020 or 4.1% of new cancer cases were attributed to alcohol.

Alcohol is thought to cause cancer through three main mechanisms: (1) DNA methylation, (2) oxidative stress, and (3) hormonal alteration. Additional mechanisms include microbiome dysbiosis, reduced immune system function, retinoid metabolism, increased levels of inflammation, 1-carbon metabolism and disruption of folate absorption.

Heavy drinking consisting of 15 or more drinks per week for men or 8 or more drinks per week for women contributed the most to cancer incidence compared with moderate drinking. The rate of alcohol related cases is 3:1 male:female, especially in oesophageal and liver cancers. Some nations have introduced alcohol packaging warning messages that inform consumers about alcohol and cancer. The alcohol industry has tried to actively mislead the public about the risk of cancer due to alcohol consumption, in addition to campaigning to remove laws that require alcoholic beverages to have cancer warning labels.

== Epidemiology ==
=== Cancers attributed to alcohol ===
In 2020, approximately 740,000 cases of alcohol-related cancers were identified globally with

- 58% of cases (430,000) residing in Asia
- 25% of cases (180,000) residing in Europe
- 8% of cases (60,000) residing in North America
- 5% of cases (39,000) residing in Latin America and the Caribbean
- 3% of cases (23,000) residing in Africa
- 1% of cases (7,000) residing in regions termed "other."

More than three-quarters of the 740,000 cases were in men.

=== United States ===
In the United States of America, alcohol-related cancer rates were highest in the following states: Delaware, Colorado, Washington, D.C., New Hampshire, and Alaska. Conversely, alcohol-related cancer rates were lowest in the following states: Kentucky, Arizona, Oklahoma, West Virginia, and Utah.

From 2013 to 2016, approximately 19,000 (4%) cancer-related deaths in the United States were attributed to alcohol consumption each year, with breast cancer and esophageal cancer deaths being the most common in women and men respectively.

An estimated 3.2% of cancer deaths in United States were attributed to alcohol consumption. The distribution of mortality by state were consistent with the distribution of incident cases. According to, Vivek Murthy, the Surgeon General of the United States, alcohol ranked third among preventable causes of cancer after tobacco and obesity.

=== Europe ===
Approximately 10% and 3% of cancer diagnoses in European men and women respectively are attributed to alcohol consumption.

A 2011 study found that one in 10 of all cancers in men and one in 33 in women were caused by past or current alcohol intake.

=== Australia ===
A 2009 study found that 2,100 Australians die from alcohol-related cancer each year.

== Alcohol as a carcinogen and co-carcinogen ==
In 1998, the International Agency for Research on Cancer (Centre International de Recherche sur le Cancer) of the World Health Organization classified alcoholic beverages as a carcinogen. Its evaluation states:

There is sufficient evidence for the carcinogenicity of alcoholic beverages in humans. […] Alcoholic beverages are carcinogenic to humans (Group 1).

After more epidemiological evidence connecting alcohol and cancers became available, the IARC reconvened in 2007. Based on epidemiological studies, which revealed cancer risk was independent of the type of alcohol, and animal studies, which showed increased cancer risk with exposure to ethanol alone, the group determined that the ethanol in alcoholic beverages was carcinogenic to humans. Alcohol was determined to increase the risk of developing breast cancer, liver cancer, colorectal cancer, esophageal cancers, pharyngeal cancer, laryngeal cancer, and oral cancer. In 2009, the group determined that acetaldehyde which is a metabolite of ethanol is also carcinogenic to humans.

The U.S. Department of Health & Human Services' National Toxicology Program (NTP) classified alcoholic beverages as a "known human carcinogen" in their 2000 Report on Carcinogens, and this classification remains current as of the 15th edition published in 2021. While the report distinguishes between the beverage itself and acetaldehyde (a byproduct of alcohol metabolism), classifying the latter as "reasonably anticipated to be a human carcinogen," the overall message is clear: consuming alcoholic drinks poses a cancer risk.

A 2001 systematic review did not find a clear safe level of alcohol consumption where there is no increased risk of cancer.

== Mechanisms ==
=== Acetaldehyde ===
Alcohol metabolism generates genotoxic acetaldehyde and reactive oxygen species. The possible mechanisms for its carcinogenicity include formation of the possible mutagen acetaldehyde, and the induction of the cytochrome P450 system which is known to produce mutagenic compounds from promutagens.

Acetaldehyde is a byproduct of ethanol breakdown in the liver, metabolized by alcohol dehydrogenase (ADH), cytochrome P-450 2E1 and bacterial catalases. The liver then normally eliminates 99% of the acetaldehyde. ALDH2 converts Acetaldehyde into acetate which is a byproduct that can be excreted through the liver. Those with ADH1B*1 have higher rates of conversion of ethanol into acetaldehyde while, people with ALDH2*2 have a slower conversion rate of acetaldehyde to acetate causing faster build up of acetaldehyde concentrations. 28-45% of east Asian populations carry the ALDH2*2 allele. An average liver can process 7 grams of ethanol per hour. For example, it takes 12 hours to eliminate the ethanol in a bottle of wine, giving 12 hours or more of acetaldehyde exposure.

The acetaldehyde motif can bind DNA to alter its physical shape or block repair and synthesis mechanisms to induce mutations, breaks and exchanges. Acetaldehyde and ethanol both inhibit S-adenosyl-L-methiodine (SAMe) synthesis which is a methyl group transferase.

=== DNA methylation ===
DNA methylation is the addition of a methyl group to the carbon-5 of nucleotides. The most common methylation site is onto a cystine preceding guanine nucleotides. This methylation is catalyzed by DNA methyltransferase enzymes taking a methyl group from SAMe. Heavy alcohol consumption is thought to cause epigenetic changes by decreasing the availability of SAMe thereby changing the methylation pattern of DNA causing hypo or hypermethylation resulting in alteration of DNA transcription.

=== Oxidative stress ===
Oxidative stress and reactive oxygen species (ROS) accumulation is a major player in cancer growth. the metabolism of ethanol by CYP450 2E1 into acetaldehyde has a byproduct of ROS. The presence of ROS in the cellular environment causes lipid peroxidation which can lead to exocyclic adducts. ROS in a tumor microenvironment can also act as an intercellular signal leading to up-regulation of vascular endothelial growth factors and monocyte chemotactic protein-1. The accumulation of iron is also found to correlate to alcohol consumption which leads to higher levels of peroxidation and resulting oxidative damage.

=== Polycyclic aromatic hydrocarbons ===
Polycyclic aromatic hydrocarbons also play a role in alcohol-induced carcinogenesis. Exposure occurs through drinking alcohol aged in charred barrels, flavored with peat smoke, or made with roasted grains.

=== Hormonal regulation ===
High levels of hormones in serum have been associated with heavy alcohol use. Especially estrogen and estradiol which can increase transcriptional activity in ER+ cells which promote cell proliferation. Those in pre-menopause using progestin contraceptives have some compensation for the high levels of estradiol, though after menopause those with heavy alcohol consumption have higher risk for breast cancer and estrogen-dependent cancers.

=== Other mechanisms ===
Additional mechanisms contribute to cancer risk with alcohol consumption. It is thought that heavy alcohol consumption can cause a decrease in folic acid availability which can decrease the availability of nucleotides for DNA repair. Additionally ethanol can decrease the conversion of homocysteine to methionine which is an essential amino acid that is part of the formation of SAMe.

Increased inflammation due to alcohol consumption can increase various cytokine formations especially NF-κB which is a transcription factor.

Additionally alcohol usage is associated with lower Vitamin A levels which causes a reduction in retinoid conversion and signaling.

Individuals who both smoke and drink are at a much higher risk of developing mouth, tracheal, and esophageal cancer. Ethanol is thought to potentially be a solvent for carcinogenic factors in smoking. Research has shown their risk of developing these cancers is 35 times higher than in individuals who neither smoke nor drink. This evidence may suggest that there is a cocarcinogenic interaction between alcohol and tobacco-related carcinogens.

=== Local carcinogenic effect of ethanol ===
The risk of cancer associated with alcohol consumption is higher in tissues in closest contact on ingestion of alcohol, such as the oral cavity, pharynx and esophagus. This is explained by the fact that ethanol is a proven carcinogen and in addition, metabolite of ethanol (acetaldehyde) produced in the liver is highly carcinogenic, thus explaining both local (mouth, throat, esophageal cancers) as well as distant (skin, liver, breast) cancers. It is well known that ethanol causes cell death at the concentrations present in alcoholic beverages. Few cells survive a one-hour exposure to 5–10% ethanol or a 15-second exposure to 30–40% ethanol in cell culture, where surviving cells might undergo genomic changes leading to carcinogenesis. But recent evidence suggests that the cytotoxic effect of ethanol on the cells lining the oral cavity, pharynx and esophagus activates the division of the stem cells located in deeper layers of the mucosa to replace the dead cells.

Every time stem cells divide, they become exposed to unavoidable errors associated with cell division (e.g., mutations arising during DNA replication and chromosomal alterations occurring during mitosis) and also become highly vulnerable to the genotoxic activity of DNA-damaging agents (e.g., acetaldehyde and tobacco carcinogens). Alcohol consumption probably increases the risk of developing cancer of the oral cavity, pharynx and esophagus by promoting the accumulation of cell divisions in the stem cells that maintain these tissues in homeostasis. Because the cytotoxic activity of ethanol is concentration-dependent, the risk of these cancers will not only increase with increasing amounts of ethanol, but also with increasing concentrations; an ounce of whisky is probably more carcinogenic when taken undiluted than when taken mixed with non-alcoholic beverages. The local cytotoxic effect of ethanol may also explain the known synergistic effect of alcohol and tobacco use on the risk of these cancers.

=== Epithelial-mesenchymal transition ===
A study found that alcohol stimulates the epithelial-mesenchymal transition (EMT), in which ordinary cancer cells change into a more aggressive form and begin to spread throughout the body.

=== Effect of alcohol on the progress of cancer ===
A study of the influence of alcohol intake on tumor growth of hepatocellular carcinoma (HCC) in patients with type C cirrhosis, found that alcohol influenced tumor volume doubling time (TVDT).

A study of chick embryos suggests that alcohol stimulates their tumor growth by fueling the production of a growth factor that stimulates blood vessel development in tumors. A 2006 study in mice showed moderate drinking resulted in larger and stronger tumors via a process known as angiogenesis.

A study where high amounts of alcohol were given to mice suggests that it accelerates their cancer growth by speeding up the loss of body fat and depressing immune activity.

== Genetic variation and cancer risk ==
Since acetaldehyde produced from the metabolism of alcohol plays a role in the carcinogenicity induced by alcohol consumption, mutations in the enzymes involved in the production of acetaldehyde can lead to increased cancer risk. These enzymes included cytochrome P450 2E1 and alcohol dehydrogenase. A study found that "the ADH1C*1 allele and genotype ADH1C*1/1 were significantly more frequent in patients with alcohol-related cancers…" A European study has found two gene variants which offer "significant" protection against mouth and throat cancers.

Alcohol is a known porphyrinogenic chemical. Several European studies have linked the inherited hepatic porphyrias with a predisposition to hepatocellular carcinoma. Typical risk factors for HCC need not be present with the acute hepatic porphyrias, specifically acute intermittent porphyria, variegate porphyria and hereditary coproporphyria. Porphyria cutanea tarda is also associated with HCC, but with typical risk factors including evidence of hepatotropic viruses, hemochromatosis and alcoholic cirrhosis. Tyrosinemia Type I, an inherited disorder in tyrosine metabolism impacting the second enzyme in the heme metabolic pathway is associated with a high risk of developing HCC in younger populations, including children.

== Risk factor for specific cancers ==
=== Moderate consumption ===
A 2022 study from the Seoul National University Hospital, over more than 4.5 million of people, who were screened over 7 years, found that

- those who increased alcohol consumption had a higher cancer risk (including, but not limited to, alcohol-related cancers) than those who kept the same level of alcohol intake;
- non-drinkers who became mild drinkers had a risk increase estimated at between 0 and 6 percent (meaning slightly greater risk, not 6 percent risk), while non-drinkers who became "moderate" drinkers had a risk increase estimated between 2 and 18 percent.

The study also had some limitations. For example, the participants were all registered at the South Korean National Health Insurance Service, but the study did not take into account alcohol metabolism diseases which are commonly found in East Asia. The participants were not younger than 40. No data was available to account for positive lifestyle and behaviors held during the screening, that may have influenced the cancer risk, nor for the participants' drinking habits that preceded the screening.

A prior study found that, "Increasing but moderate alcohol consumption in women was determined to be associated with an increased risk of cancers of the oral cavity and pharynx, esophagus, larynx, rectum, breast, and liver…".

==== Cancers of the mouth, esophagus, pharynx, and larynx ====
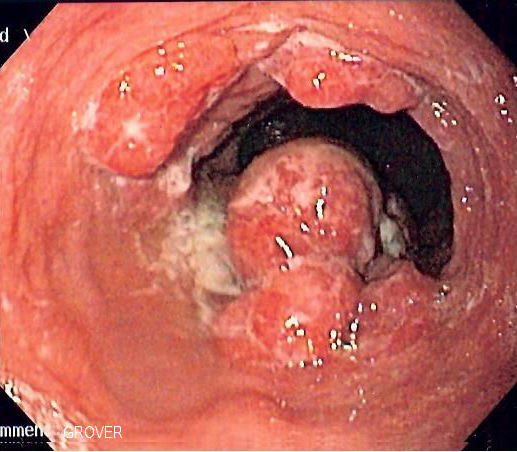
Endoscopic image of patient with esophageal adenocarcinoma seen at gastro-esophageal junction

Alcohol consumption at any quantity is a risk factor for head and neck cancers, such as cancers of the mouth, esophagus, pharynx and larynx.

The U.S. National Cancer Institute states "Drinking alcohol increases the risk of cancers of the mouth, esophagus, pharynx, larynx, and liver in men and women, … In general, risks increases above baseline with any alcohol intake (mild; <2 glass of wine per week) and increases significantly with moderate alcohol intake (one glass of wine per day) with highest risk in those with greater than 7 glasses of wine per week. (A drink is defined as 12 ounces of regular beer, 5 ounces of wine, or 1.5 ounces of 80-proof liquor.) … Also, using alcohol with tobacco is riskier than using either one alone, because it further increases the chances of getting cancers of the mouth, throat, and esophagus."

The federal government's Dietary Guidelines for Americans 2010 defines moderate alcohol drinking as up to one drink per day for women and up to two drinks per day for men. Heavy alcohol drinking is defined as having more than three drinks on any day or more than seven drinks per week for women and more than four drinks on any day or more than 14 drinks per week for men.

The International Head and Neck Cancer Epidemiology (INHANCE) Consortium co-ordinated a meta-study on the issue. A study looking at laryngeal cancer and beverage type concluded, "This study thus indicates that in the Italian population characterized by frequent wine consumption, wine is the beverage most strongly related to the risk of laryngeal cancer."

A review of the epidemiological literature published from 1966 to 2006 concluded that:

- The risk of esophageal cancer nearly doubled in the first two years following alcohol cessation, a sharp increase that may be due to the fact that some people only stop drinking when they are already experiencing disease symptoms. However, risk then decreased rapidly and significantly after longer periods of abstention.
- Risk of head and neck cancer only reduced significantly after 10 years of cessation.
- After more than 20 years of alcohol cessation, the risks for both cancers were similar to those seen in people who never drank alcohol.

A study concluded that for every additional drink regularly consumed per day, the incidence of oral cavity and pharynx cancers increases by 1 per 1000. The incidence of cancers of the esophagus and larynx increase by 0.7 per 1000.

A 2008 study suggests that acetaldehyde (a breakdown product of alcohol) is implicated in oral cancer.

==== Breast cancer ====
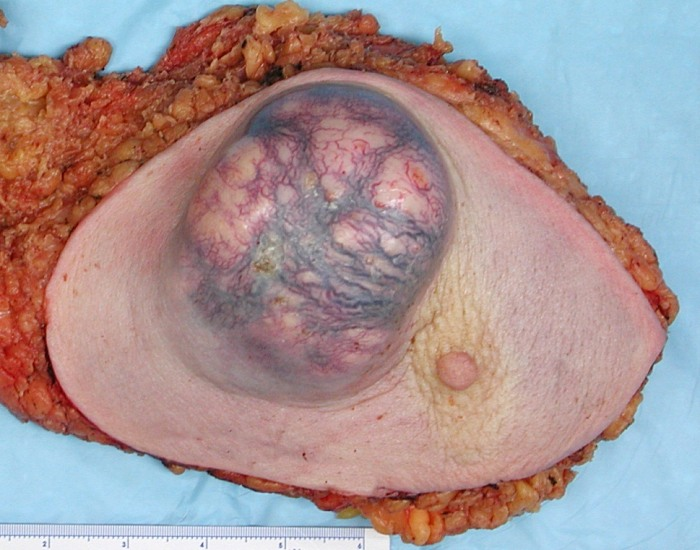
Mastectomy specimen containing a very large cancer of the breast (in this case, an invasive ductal carcinoma)

Alcohol is a risk factor for breast cancer in women.

A woman drinking an average of two units of alcohol per day has an 8% higher risk of developing breast cancer than a woman who drinks an average of one unit of alcohol per day. A study concluded that for every additional drink regularly consumed per day, the incidence of breast cancer increases by 11 per 1000. Approximately 6% (between 3.2% and 8.8%) of breast cancers reported in the UK each year could be prevented if drinking was reduced to a very low level (i.e. less than 1 unit/week). Moderate to heavy consumption of alcoholic beverages (at least three to four drinks per week) is associated with a 1.3-fold increased risk of the recurrence of breast cancer. Further, consumption of alcohol at any quantity is associated with significantly increased risk of relapse in breast cancer survivors.

==== Colorectal cancer ====
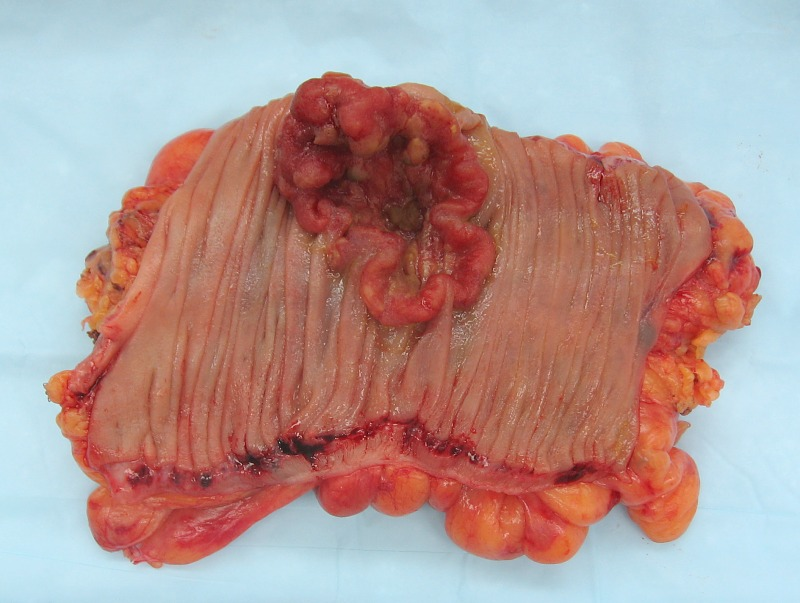
Colectomy specimen containing an invasive colorectal carcinoma (the crater-like, reddish, irregularly-shaped tumor)

Drinking may be a cause of earlier onset of colorectal cancer. The evidence that alcohol is a cause of bowel cancer is convincing in men and probable in women.

The National Institutes of Health, the National Cancer Institute, Cancer Research, the American Cancer Society, the Mayo Clinic, and the Colorectal Cancer Coalition, American Society of Clinical Oncology and the Memorial Sloan-Kettering Cancer Center list alcohol as a risk factor.

A WCRF panel report finds the evidence "convincing" that alcoholic drinks increase the risk of colorectal cancer in men at consumption levels above 30 grams of absolute alcohol daily. The National Cancer Institute states, "Heavy alcohol use may also increase the risk of colorectal cancer"

A 2011 meta-analysis found that alcohol consumption was associated with an increased risk of colorectal cancer.

==== Liver cancer ====
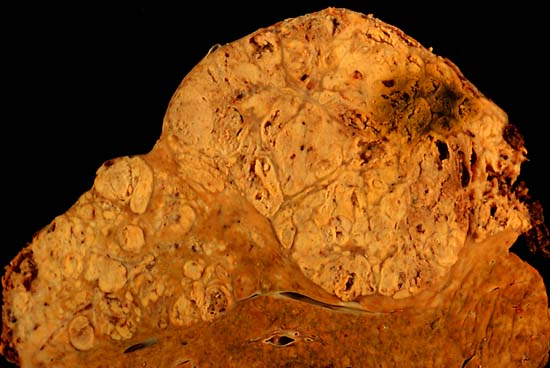
Hepatocellular carcinoma in an individual that was hepatitis C positive. Autopsy specimen.

Alcohol is a risk factor for liver cancer, through cirrhosis. "Cirrhosis results from scar formation within the liver, most commonly due to chronic alcohol use."

"Approximately 5 percent of people with cirrhosis develop liver cancer. Cirrhosis is a disease that develops when liver cells are replaced with scar tissue after damage from alcohol abuse, …"

The NIAAA reports that "Prolonged, heavy drinking has been associated in many cases with primary liver cancer." However, it is liver cirrhosis, whether caused by alcohol or another factor, that is thought to induce the cancer."

"The chances of getting liver cancer increase markedly with five or more drinks per day" (NCI).

A study concluded that for every additional drink regularly consumed per day, the incidence of liver cancer increases by 0.7 per 1000.

In the United States, liver cancer is relatively uncommon, affecting approximately 2 people per 100,000, but excessive alcohol consumption is linked to as many as 36% of these cases by some investigators. "Overall, 61% of HCC were attributable to HCV [hepatitis C virus], 13% to HBV [hepatitis B virus], and 18% to heavy alcohol drinking." A study in the province of Brescia, northern Italy concluded, "On the basis of population attributable risks (AR), heavy alcohol intake seems to be the single most relevant cause of HCC in this area (AR: 45%), followed by HCV (AR: 36%), and HBV (AR: 22%) infection."

==== Lung cancer ====
Alcohol intake of more than 2 drinks per day is associated with a small increased risk of lung cancer. Commenting on a study by Freudenheim et al., R. Curtis Ellison MD writes, "This study, like others, suggests a weak, positive association between consuming larger amounts of alcohol (>2 drinks a day) and lung cancer risk." However, studies on the relationship between alcohol consumption and lung cancer have yielded conflicting results. Studies are typically impacted by confounding due to factors like smoking which is one of the most significant risk factors for the development of lung cancer. The association of alcohol consumption with lung cancer is unclear.

==== Skin cancer ====
Results from the European Prospective Investigation into Cancer and nutrition (EPIC) cohort indicated a positive association between alcohol consumption and skin cancer. Baseline alcohol intake as well as lifetime alcohol consumption were associated with an increased risk of the development of squamous cell carcinoma, basal cell carcinoma, and melanoma in men. There was also an increased risk of these skin cancers in women, but the association wasn't as strong as that seen in men. Any alcohol intake is associated with the development of melanoma.

==== Stomach cancer ====
"Statistically significant increases in risk also existed for cancers of the stomach, colon, rectum, liver, female breast, and ovaries."

"While alcohol has been extensively studied as a cause of stomach cancer there is no conclusive evidence that it increases risk. However, results from at least three studies suggest that heavy alcohol consumption may increase the risk of stomach cancer in heavy smokers."

A Taiwanese study concluded, "…cigarette smoking may play the most harmful role in the initial development of gastric cancer, and that drinking alcohol may promote the process."

A Norwegian study found that, "No statistically significant associations between various degrees of exposure to alcohol and risk of gastric cancer was revealed, but combined high use of cigarettes (>20/day) and alcohol (>5 occasions/14 days) increased the risk of noncardia gastric cancer nearly 5-fold (HR = 4.90 [95% CI = 1.90–12.62]), compared to nonusers."

=== Heavy consumption ===
==== Endometrial cancer ====
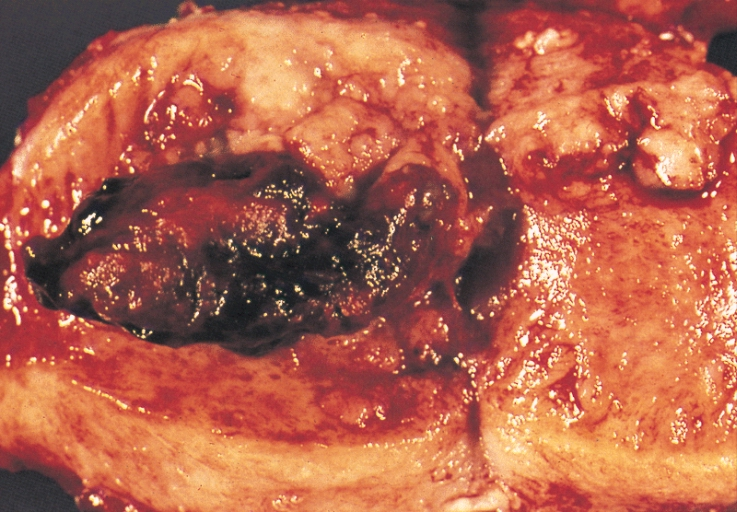
An endometrial adenocarcinoma invading the uterine muscle

Alcohol has been identified as a risk factor for endometrial cancer. Data however, on the association of alcohol intake and endometrial cancer is conflicting. Where data exists for an association low to moderate intake of alcohol, (less than two drinks per day) is not associated with an increased risk but an association has been suggested for higher alcohol intake. "Our results suggest that only alcohol consumption equivalent to 2 or more drinks per day increases risk of endometrial cancer in postmenopausal women." "In conclusion, our results suggest that low alcohol consumption (up to one drink per day) is unlikely to substantially influence risk of endometrial cancer."

==== Gallbladder cancer ====
Alcohol has been suggested as a risk factor for gallbladder cancer. Evidence suggests that a high intake of alcohol is associated with gallbladder cancer. Men may be at a higher risk of alcohol-related gallbladder cancer than women.

==== Ovarian cancer ====
"Thus, the results of this study suggest that relatively elevated alcohol intake (of the order of 40 g per day or more) may cause a modest increase of epithelial ovarian cancer risk.". "Associations were also found between alcohol consumption and cancers of the ovary and prostate, but only for 50 g and 100 g a day." "Statistically significant increases in risk also existed for cancers of the stomach, colon, rectum, liver, female breast, and ovaries."

"Thus, this pooled analysis does not provide support for an association between moderate alcohol intake and ovarian cancer risk."

==== Prostate cancer ====
"Data from the Health Professionals Follow-Up Study showed only a weak association between overall alcohol intake and prostate cancer risk, and no association at all between red wine intake and prostate cancer risk."

A meta-analysis published in 2001 found a small but significant increased risk for men drinking more than 50 g/day of alcohol, with a slightly higher risk for men consuming more than 100 g/day. Since that analysis, cohort studies in America have found increased risks for men drinking moderate amounts of spirits, and for 'binge drinkers, but moderate consumption of beer or wine has not been linked to an increased risk.

Alcohol consumption of 50 g and 100 g per day is also associated with cancers of the ovary and prostate. However, one study concludes, that moderate alcohol consumption increases the risk of prostate cancer. Liquor, but not wine or beer, consumption was positively associated with prostate cancer."

The Fred Hutchinson Cancer Research Center found that men who consumed four or more glasses of red wine per week had a 50 percent reduction in the risk of developing prostate cancer. They "found no significant effects – positive nor negative – associated with the consumption of beer or hard liquor and no consistent risk reduction with white wine, which suggests that there must be a beneficial compound in red wine that other types of alcohol lack. That compound … may be an antioxidant called resveratrol, which is abundant in the skins of red grapes.".

A meta analysis of studies published in 2009 found that consumption of only 2 standard drinks per day increased the cancer risk by 20%.

==== Small intestine cancer ====
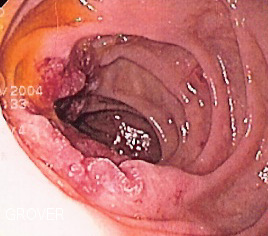
Endoscopic image of adenocarcinoma of duodenum seen in the post-bulbar duodenum

A study of small intestine cancer patients reported that alcohol consumption was associated with adenocarcinomas and malignant carcinoid tumors.

"In men and women combined, a significant 3-fold increased risk in heavy drinkers (80+g ethanol/day) relative to more moderate drinkers and non-drinkers was observed."

"Alcohol and tobacco consumption did not increase the risk of adenocarcinoma of the small intestine. … While the present data are inconsistent with a major effect of tobacco or alcohol, a moderate association between these factors and small bowel cancer may have been obscured by the play of chance."

=== Mixed evidence ===
==== Leukemia ====
Intake of alcohol during pregnancy has been associated with childhood leukemia. A review published by the National Cancer Institute placed maternal alcohol consumption during pregnancy in the category of "suggestive" but concluded that the risk was not important.

Acute lymphocytic leukemia (ALL)

For ALL in children, maternal alcohol consumption during pregnancy is "unlikely to be an important risk factor for ALL"

Acute myeloid leukemia (AML)

A study concluded, "In conclusion, even though our study did not show a clear association between alcohol intake and leukemia risk, some of the patterns of the risk estimates (a possible J-shaped dose-response curve between alcohol intake and ALL, AML, and CLL risks, and the positive association between alcohol and CML), may be suggestive."

Childhood AML

"Three studies have reported an increased risk (approximately 1.5-2 fold) in mothers who drank alcoholic beverages during pregnancy. These associations have been particularly apparent in children diagnosed younger than three years of age.". "Maternal alcohol consumption during pregnancy increases the risk of infant leukemia, especially AML."

Acute non-lymphocytic leukemia (ANLL)

A study found that intrauterine exposure to alcohol doubled the risk for childhood ANLL.

Chronic lymphocytic leukemia (CLL)

A study concluded, "In conclusion, even though our study did not show a clear association between alcohol intake and leukemia risk, some of the patterns of the risk estimates (a possible J-shaped dose-response curve between alcohol intake and ALL, AML, and CLL risks, and the positive association between alcohol and CML), may be suggestive."

Chronic myeloid leukemia (CML)

A population-based case-control study in Italy found a non-significant positive association between drinking and CML.

Hairy cell leukemia

A study concluded, "There was no association found for cigarette smoking, alcohol or coffee consumption and hairy cell leukemia."

==== Multiple myeloma (MM) ====
Alcohol has been suggested as a possible cause of multiple myeloma, although a study found no association between MM in a comparison study between drinkers and non-drinkers.

==== Pancreatic cancer ====
Whilst the association between alcohol abuse and pancreatitis is well established the association between alcohol consumption and pancreatic cancer is less clear. Overall the evidence suggests a slightly increased risk of pancreatic cancer with chronic heavy alcohol consumption but the evidence remains conflicting with a number of studies finding no association., but no increased risk for people consuming up to 30g of alcohol a day

Overall, the association is consistently weak and the majority of studies have found no association. Although drinking alcohol excessively is a major cause of chronic pancreatitis, which in turn predisposes to pancreatic cancer, chronic pancreatitis associated with alcohol consumption is less frequently a precursor for pancreatic cancer than other types of chronic pancreatitis.

Some studies suggest a relationship, the risk increasing with increasing amount of alcohol intake. The risk is greatest in heavy drinkers, mostly on the order of four or more drinks per day. There appears to be no increased risk for people consuming up to 30g of alcohol a day, which is approximately 2 alcoholic beverages/day, so most people who take alcohol do so at a level that "is probably not a risk factor for pancreatic cancer". A pooled analysis concluded, "Our findings are consistent with a modest increase in risk of pancreatic cancer with consumption of 30 or more grams of alcohol per day".

Several studies caution that their findings could be due to confounding factors. Even if a link exists, it "could be due to the contents of some alcoholic beverages" other than the alcohol itself. One Dutch study even found that drinkers of white wine had lower risk.

"About 7 out of 10 cases of chronic pancreatitis are due to long term heavy drinking. Chronic pancreatitis is a known risk factor for cancer of the pancreas. But chronic pancreatitis that is due to alcohol doesn't increase risk as much as other types of chronic pancreatitis. So if there is a link with alcohol and pancreatic cancer risk, it is only very slight."

"Our findings indicate that alcohol drinking at the levels typically consumed by the general population of the United States is probably not a risk factor for pancreatic cancer. Our data suggest, however, that heavy alcohol drinking may be related to pancreatic cancer risk."

"Relative risks of pancreatic cancer increased with the amount of alcohol consumed (Ptrend = 0.11) after adjustment for age, smoking status, and pack-years of smoking."

"Alcoholics had only a modest 40% excess risk of pancreatic cancer … The excess risk for pancreatic cancer among alcoholics is small and could conceivably be attributed to confounding by smoking."

"It was shown that the relative risk of cancer of the pancreas increases with fat and alcohol intakes, … Alcohol may be not directly involved in the aetiology of cancer of the pancreas: its effect could be due to the contents of some alcoholic beverages."

"When compared with data from non-drinkers, the cumulative lifetime consumption of all types of alcohol in grams of ethanol… beer, spirits, red wine and fortified wine was not related to risk. The consumption of white wine was inversely associated with risk…. The uniformly reduced risk estimates for the lifetime number of drinks of white wine were based on small numbers…."

"For the most part, consumption of total alcohol, wine, liquor and beer was not associated with pancreatic cancer."

"Data from these two large cohorts do not support any overall association between coffee intake or alcohol intake and risk of pancreatic cancer."

"Our findings are consistent with a modest increase in risk of pancreatic cancer with consumption of 30 or more grams of alcohol per day."

=== Not suspected to increase risk ===
This section lists cancers where alcohol is not listed as a risk factor and where papers have been published.

==== Childhood astrocytoma ====
A study concluded that foetal exposure to alcohol is not associated with childhood astrocytoma.

==== Bile duct cancer ====
A review of the literature found that there is no association between alcohol use and bile duct cancer.

==== Bladder cancer ====
"Epidemiological data on alcohol drinking and bladder cancer are suggestive of no association, although findings were not always consistent. For both habits, an explanation of the moderate increase in risk observed in some investigations might be attributed to residual confounding by smoking, or to an association between alcohol, coffee, and yet unidentified risk factors for bladder cancer."

==== Cervical cancer ====
A study concluded "that alcoholic women are at high risk for in situ and invasive cervical cancer" but attributed this to indirect, lifestyle-related reasons.

==== Ductal carcinoma in situ (DCIS) breast cancer ====
"DCIS patients and control subjects did not differ with respect to oral contraceptive use, hormone replacement therapy, alcohol consumption or smoking history, or breast self-examination. Associations for LCIS were similar."

==== Ependymoma ====
A review of the basic literature found that consumption of beer was associated with increased risk in one study but not in another

==== Intraocular and uveal melanomas ====
A study found no association between alcohol and uveal melanoma.

==== Nasopharynageal cancer / Nasopharyngeal carcinoma (NPC) ====
A systematic review found evidence that light drinking may decrease the risk of nasopharyngeal carcinoma whereas high intake of alcohol may increase the risk.

==== Neuroblastoma ====
A few studies have indicated an increased risk of neuroblastoma with use of alcohol during pregnancy.

==== Salivary gland cancer (SGC) ====
Alcohol use is associated with an increased risk of salivary gland cancer.

==== Testicular cancer ====
A review concluded that "There is no firm evidence of a causal relation between behavior risks [tobacco, alcohol and diet] and testicular cancer."

==== Thyroid cancer ====
A 2009 review found that alcohol intake does not affect the risk of developing thyroid cancer. However, a 2009 study of 490,000 men and women concluded that alcohol may reduce the risk of thyroid cancer. A 2009 study of 1,280,296 women in the United Kingdom concluded, "The decreased risk for thyroid cancer that we find to be associated with alcohol intake is consistent with results from some studies, although a meta-analysis of 10 case–control studies and two other cohort studies reported no statistically significant associations."

==== Vaginal cancer ====
A Danish study found that "Abstinence from alcohol consumption was associated with low risk for both VV-SCC_{vagina} and VV-SCC_{vulva} in our study."

A study concluded that alcoholic women are at high risk for cancer of the vagina. In both studies, indirect, lifestyle-related reasons were cited.

==== Vulvar cancer ====
One study reported "No consistent association emerged between milk, meat, liver, alcohol and coffee consumption and risk of vulvar cancer." A Danish study found the reverse, that alcohol consumption is significantly associated with VV-SCC_{vagina} and VV-SCC_{vulva} cancer. A Swedish study concluded that alcoholic women are at no higher risk for cancer of the vulva.

=== May reduce risk ===
==== Hodgkin's lymphoma (HL) ====
A study concluded, "The results of this large-scale European study … suggested a protective effect of alcohol on development of NHL for men and in non-Mediterranean countries." A population based case-control study in Germany found that alcohol reduced the risk of HL for both men and women but more so for men, whose risk was lowered by 53%.

A population-based case-control study in Italy reported a protective effect of alcohol consumption on risk of HL among non-smokers. Analysis of data from a series of case-control studies in Northern Italy revealed a modest positive effect of alcohol on lowering risk of HL among both smokers and non-smokers.

A study considering more than 1 million American women found that increasing levels of alcohol consumption were associated with a decreased risk of Hodgkin's Lymphoma.

==== Kidney cancer (renal cell carcinoma) (RCC) ====
"Moderate alcohol consumption was associated with a lower risk of renal cell cancer among both women and men in this pooled analysis" "This pooled analysis found an inverse association between alcohol drinking and RCC. Risks continued to decrease even above eight drinks per day (i.e. >100 g/day) of alcohol intake, with no apparent levelling in risk."

A study concluded, "Results from our prospective cohort study of middle-aged and elderly women indicate that moderate alcohol consumption may be associated with decreased risk of RCC." Researchers who conducted a study in Iowa reported that "In this population-based case-control investigation, we report further evidence that alcohol consumption decreases the risk of RCC among women but not among men. Our ability to show that the association remains after multivariate adjustment for several new confounding factors (i.e., diet, physical activity, and family history) strengthens support for a true association.

Another study found no relationship between alcohol consumption and risk of kidney cancer among either men or women.

A Finnish study concluded, "These data suggest that alcohol consumption is associated with decreased risk of RCC in male smokers. Because most of the risk reductions were seen at the highest quartile of alcohol intake and alcohol is a risk factor for a number of cancers particularly among smokers, these data should be interpreted with caution." "Our data suggest an inverse association between alcohol intake and risk of renal cell cancer…" Compared with nondrinkers, men who drank one or more drinks per day had a 31% lower risk of kidney cancer among 161,126 Hawaii-Los Angeles Multiethnic Cohort participants.

A study considering more than 1 million American women found that increasing levels of alcohol consumption were associated with a decreased risk of renal cancer.

==== Non-Hodgkin lymphoma (NHL) ====
A study concluded, "People who drink alcoholic beverages might have a lower risk of NHL than those who do not, and this risk might vary by NHL subtype." "Compared with nondrinkers, alcohol consumers had a lower risk for non-Hodgkin's lymphoma overall … and for its main subtypes." A study concluded, "Nonusers of alcohol had an elevated NHL risk compared with users…"

Some studies have found a protective effect on NHL of drinking some forms of alcoholic beverage or in some demographic groups. A study of men in the US found that consumption of wine, but not beer or spirits, was associated with a reduced NHL risk and a large European study found a protective effect of alcohol among men and in non-Mediterranean countries.." A study of older women in Iowa found alcohol to reduce the risk of NHL and the amount of alcohol consumed, rather than the type of alcoholic beverages, appeared to be the main determinant in reducing risk." A possible mechanism has been suggested.

Some studies have not found a protective effect from drinking. British research found no association between frequency of drinking and NHL and research in Sweden found that total beer, wine, or liquor intake was not associated with any major subtype of NHL examined, apart from an association between high wine consumption and increased risk of chronic lymphocytic leukemia.."

One study of NHL patients concluded, "Our findings strongly encourage physicians to advise NHL patients to stop smoking and diminish alcohol consumption to obtain improvements in the course of NHL."

A study considering more than 1 million American women found that increasing levels of alcohol consumption were associated with a decreased risk of non-Hodgkin lymphoma.

== Recommended maximum alcohol intake ==
As outlined above, there is no recommended alcohol intake with respect to cancer risk alone as it varies with each individual cancer. See Alcohol consumption recommendations for a list of governments' guidances on alcohol intake which, for a healthy man, range from 140–280g per week.

One meta-analysis suggests that risks of cancers may start below the recommended levels. "Risk increased significantly for drinkers, compared with non-drinkers, beginning at an intake of 25 g (< 2 standard drinks) per day for the following: cancers of the oral cavity and pharynx (relative risk, RR, 1.9), esophagus (RR 1.4), larynx (RR 1.4), breast (RR 1.3), liver (RR 1.2), colon (RR 1.1), and rectum (RR 1.1)"

World Cancer Research Fund recommends that people aim to limit consumption to less than two drinks a day for a man and less than one drink a day for a woman. It defines a "drink" as containing about 10–15 grams of ethanol.

== Alcohol industry manipulation of the science on alcohol and cancer ==
A study published in 2017 has found that front organisations set up by the world's leading alcohol companies are actively misleading the public about the risk of cancer due to alcohol consumption. The study drew parallels with the long-standing activities of the tobacco industry. It also claimed that there was a particular focus on misleading women drinkers, because much of the misinformation about cancer produced by these companies was found to be focused on breast cancer.

The alcohol industry around the world has also campaigned to remove laws that require alcoholic beverages to have cancer warning labels.

A 2019 survey conducted by the American Institute for Cancer Research (AICR) showed that only 45% of Americans were aware of the associated risk of cancer due to alcohol consumption, up from 39% in 2017. The AICR believes that alcohol-related advertisements about the healthy cardiovascular benefits of modest alcohol overshadow messages about the increased cancer risks.

== See also ==
- Health benefits of quitting alcohol
- Long-term effects of alcohol
