= Alcohol-related dementia =

Medical condition

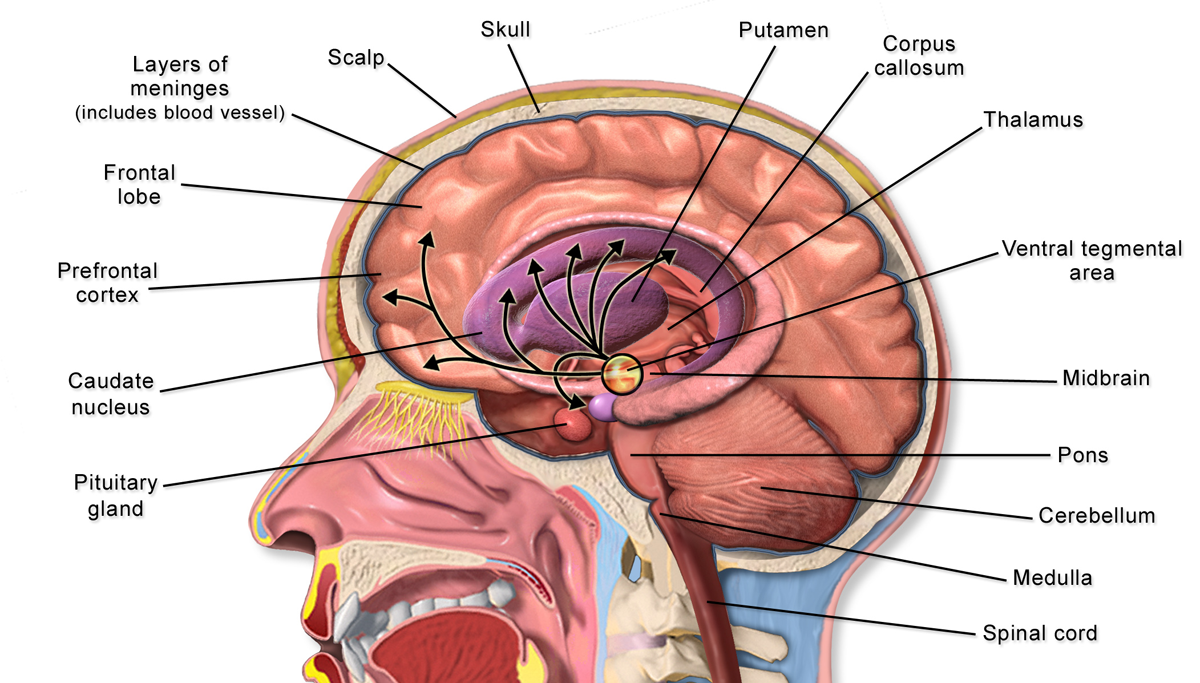
- Brain anatomy diagram
- Specialty: Neurology
- Causes: Alcoholism

Alcohol-related dementia (ARD) is a form of dementia caused by long-term, excessive consumption of alcohol, resulting in neurological damage and impaired cognitive function.

== Signs and symptoms ==
Alcohol-related dementia presents as a global deterioration in intellectual function with memory not being specifically affected, but it may occur with other forms of dementia, resulting in a wide range of symptoms. Certain individuals with alcohol-related dementia present with damage to the frontal lobes of their brain causing disinhibition, loss of planning and executive functions, and a disregard for the consequences of their behavior. Other types of alcohol-related dementia such as Wernicke encephalopathy cause the destruction of certain areas of the brain, where changes in memory, primarily a loss of short-term memory, are the main symptom. Most presentations of alcohol dementia are somewhere along the spectrum between a global dementia and Korsakoff's psychosis, and may include symptoms of both.

Individuals affected by alcohol-related dementia may develop memory problems, language impairment, and an inability to perform complex motor tasks such as getting dressed. Heavy alcohol consumption also damages the nerves in arms and legs, i.e. peripheral neuropathy, as well as the cerebellum that controls coordination thereby leading to the development of cerebellar ataxia. These patients frequently have problems with sensation in their extremities and may demonstrate unsteadiness on their feet.

Alcohol-related dementia can produce a variety of psychiatric problems including psychosis (disconnection from reality), depression, anxiety, and personality changes. Patients with alcoholic dementia often develop apathy, related to frontal lobe damage, that may mimic depression. People with an alcohol use disorder are more likely to become depressed than people without alcohol use disorder, and it may be difficult to differentiate between depression and alcohol dementia.

== Pathophysiology ==
Epidemiological studies show an association between long-term alcohol intoxication and dementia. Alcohol can damage the brain directly as a neurotoxin, or it can damage it indirectly by causing malnutrition, primarily a loss of thiamine (vitamin B1). Alcohol use disorder is common in older persons, and alcohol-related dementia is under-diagnosed.

== Diagnosis ==
The signs and symptoms of alcohol-related dementia are essentially the same as the symptoms present in other types of dementia, making alcohol-related dementia difficult to diagnose. There are very few qualitative differences between alcohol dementia and Alzheimer's disease and it is therefore difficult to distinguish between the two. Some of these warning signs may include memory loss, difficulty performing familiar tasks, poor or impaired judgment and problems with language. However the biggest indicator is friends or family members reporting changes in personality.

A simple test for intellectual function, like the Folstein mini–mental state examination, is the minimum screen for dementia. The test requires 15–20 minutes to administer and is available in mental health centers.

Diagnosing alcohol-related dementia can be difficult due to the wide range of symptoms and a lack of specific brain pathology. The Diagnostic and Statistical Manual of Mental Disorders (DSM-5-TR) is a guide to aid doctors in diagnosing a range of psychiatric disorders, and may be helpful in diagnosing dementia.

=== Diagnostic criteria ===
The existence of alcohol-related dementia is widely acknowledged but not often used as a diagnosis, due to a lack of widely accepted, non-subjective diagnostic criteria; more research is needed. Criteria for alcohol-induced persistent dementia in the Diagnostic and Statistical Manual of Mental Disorders (DSM-IV) include the following:

A. The development of multiple cognitive deficits manifested by both:
1. Memory impairment (impaired ability to learn new information or to recall previously learned information)
2. One (or more) of the following cognitive disturbances:

- (a) Aphasia (language disturbance)
- (b) Apraxia (impaired ability to carry out motor activities despite intact motor function)
- (c) Agnosia (failure to recognize or identify objects despite intact sensory function)
- (d) Disturbance in executive functioning (i.e. planning, organizing, sequencing, abstracting)

B. The cognitive deficits in criteria A1 and A2 each cause significant impairment in social or occupational functioning and represent a significant decline from a previous level of functioning.

C. The deficits do not occur exclusively during the course of a delirium and persist beyond the usual duration of substance intoxication or withdrawal.

D. There is evidence from the history, physical examination, or laboratory findings that deficits are etiologically related to the persisting effects of substance use.

There are problems with DSM diagnostic criteria. First, they are vague and subjective. Furthermore, the criteria for diagnosis of dementia were inspired by the clinical presentation of Alzheimer's disease and are poorly adapted to the diagnosis of other dementias. This has led to efforts to develop better diagnostic models.

Oslin (Int J Geriatr Psychiatry 1998) proposed alternative clinical diagnostic criteria which were validated. The criteria include a clinical diagnosis of dementia at least 60 days after last exposure to alcohol, significant alcohol use (i.e. minimum 35 standard drinks/week for males and 28 for women) for more than five years, and significant alcohol use occurring within three years of the initial onset of cognitive deficits. Oslin proposed the new and refined diagnostic criteria for alcohol-related dementia because he hoped that the redefined classification system would bring more awareness and clarity to the relationship between alcohol use and dementia.

Oslin's proposed classification of ARD:

- Definite alcohol-related dementia

At the current time there are no acceptable criteria to definitively define alcohol-related dementia.

- Probable alcohol-related dementia

A. The criteria for the clinical diagnosis of probable alcohol-related dementia include the following:
1. A clinical diagnosis of dementia at least 60 days after the last exposure to alcohol.
2. Significant alcohol use as defined by a minimum average of 35 standard drinks per week for men (28 for women) for greater than a period of five years. The period of significant alcohol use must occur within three years of the initial onset of dementia.
B. The diagnosis of alcohol-related dementia is supported by the presence of any of the following:
1. Alcohol related hepatic, pancreatic, gastrointestinal, cardiovascular, or renal disease i.e. other end-organ damage.
2. Ataxia or peripheral sensory polyneuropathy (not attributed to other causes).
3. Beyond 60 days of abstinence, the cognitive impairment stabilizes or improves.
4. After 60 days of abstinence, any neuroimaging evidence of ventricular or sulcal dilatation improves.
5. Neuroimaging evidence of cerebellar atrophy, especially in the vermis.
C. The following clinical features cast doubt on the diagnosis of alcohol-related dementia:
1. The presence of language impairment, especially dysnomia or anomia.
2. the presence of focal neurologic signs or symptoms (except ataxia or peripheral sensory polyneuropathy).
3. Neuroimaging evidence for cortical or subcortical infarction, subdural hematoma, or other focal brain pathology.
4. Elevated Hachinski Ischemia Scale score.
D. Clinical features that are neither supportive nor cast doubt on the diagnosis of alcohol-related dementia included:
1. Neuroimaging evidence of cortical atrophy.
2. The presence of periventricular or deep white matter lesions on neuroimaging in the absence of focal infarct(s).
3. The presence of the Apolipoprotein c4 allele.

== Treatment ==
ARD is treated with abstinence from further alcohol consumption.

== Prognosis ==
Multiple withdrawals and binge drinking may significantly exacerbate cognitive deficits. Older individuals are at greater risk of cognitive changes.

=== Recovery ===
Following abstinence, many deficits often resolve rapidly (in as little as a week). Further gradual recovery of cognitive abilities may take place over several years. Executive function, working memory, perceptual impairment, and motor impairments often persist after short-term abstinence. Recovery of cognitive skills appears correlated to recent intake levels and duration of abstinence, rather than to lifetime cumulative alcohol intake.

Older individuals are less likely to recover completely following cessation of alcohol intake.

== Epidemiology ==
The onset of alcohol dementia can occur as early as age 30, although it is far more common that the dementia will reveal itself anywhere from age 50 to 70. The onset and the severity of this type of dementia is directly correlated to the amount of alcohol that a person consumes over their lifetime.

Sex appears to be a risk factor for cognitive impairment, with females being more susceptible despite lower alcohol intake.

A French study, looking at other studies of thousands of subjects, found that moderate alcohol consumption (up to four glasses of wine per week) was associated with lower levels of dementia, and vice versa. There is insufficient evidence to assume that alcohol is protective against dementia at any level of intake; some studies found the opposite effect, and the quality of evidence from current epidemiological studies is poor overall (since observational studies assessing health effects of alcohol intake cannot adequately control for confounding factors).

== Notable cases ==
The Australian entertainer and "King of Comedy" Graham Kennedy had alcohol-related dementia at time of his death in 2005.

American media personality Wendy Williams was reported to have alcohol-related dementia in December 2025.

== Terminology ==
Alcohol-related dementia is a broad term currently preferred among medical professionals. If a person has alcohol-related 'dementia' they will struggle with day-to-day tasks. This is because of the damage to their brain, caused by regularly drinking too much alcohol over many years. This affects memory, learning and other mental functions. Korsakoff's syndrome and Wernicke–Korsakoff syndrome are particular forms of alcohol related brain injury which may be related to alcohol related dementia. Many experts use the terms alcohol (or alcoholic) dementia to describe a specific form of ARD, characterized by impaired executive function (planning, thinking, and judgment).
