= Alcohol =

Alcohol may refer to:

== Common uses ==
- Ethanol, one of several alcohols, commonly known as alcohol in everyday life (as a chemical)
  - Alcohol (drug), intoxicant found in alcoholic beverages (as a psychoactive drug)
  - Alcoholic beverage, an alcoholic drink
- Alcohol (chemistry), a class of compounds
- Rubbing alcohol, for sanitation and to kill germs

== Songs ==
- "Alcohol", by Barenaked Ladies from the 1998 album Stunt
- "Alcohol", by Beck from the 1993 single "Loser"
- "Alcohol" (Brad Paisley song), 2005
- "Alcohol", by Butthole Surfers from the 1993 album Independent Worm Saloon
- "Alcohol", by CSS from the 2005 album Cansei de Ser Sexy
- "Alcohol", by Flavour from the 2010 album Uplifted
- "Alcohol", by Gang Green from the 1986 album Another Wasted Night
- "Alcohol", by Gogol Bordello from the 2007 album Super Taranta!
- "Alcohol", by the Kinks from the 1977 album Muswell Hillbillies and Everybody's in Show-Biz
- "Alcohol", by Millionaires, 2008
- "Alcohol", by Terminaator from the 1994 album Lõputu päev
- "Alkohol", by Abwärts, 1987
- "Alkohol", by Herbert Grönemeyer from the 1984 album 4630 Bochum

== Other uses ==
- Alcohol (horse) (foaled 2008), Australian racehorse
- Alcohol (journal), a peer-reviewed medical journal
- Alkohol, a 1919 German silent drama film
- Alcohol 120%, an optical disc authoring program by Alcohol Soft
- "Alcohol" (Not Going Out), a 2014 television episode

== See also ==
- Alcohol-free (disambiguation)
- Glossary of alcohol (drug) terms
- Index of alcohol-related articles
