= Barsom (surname) =

Barsom is a surname. Notable people with the surname include:

- Abgar Barsom (born 1977), Aramean-Swedish football player
- Valerie Barsom (born 1960), American attorney and politician

== See also ==
- Barson
