= Carlo Fea =

Italian archaeologist (1753–1836)

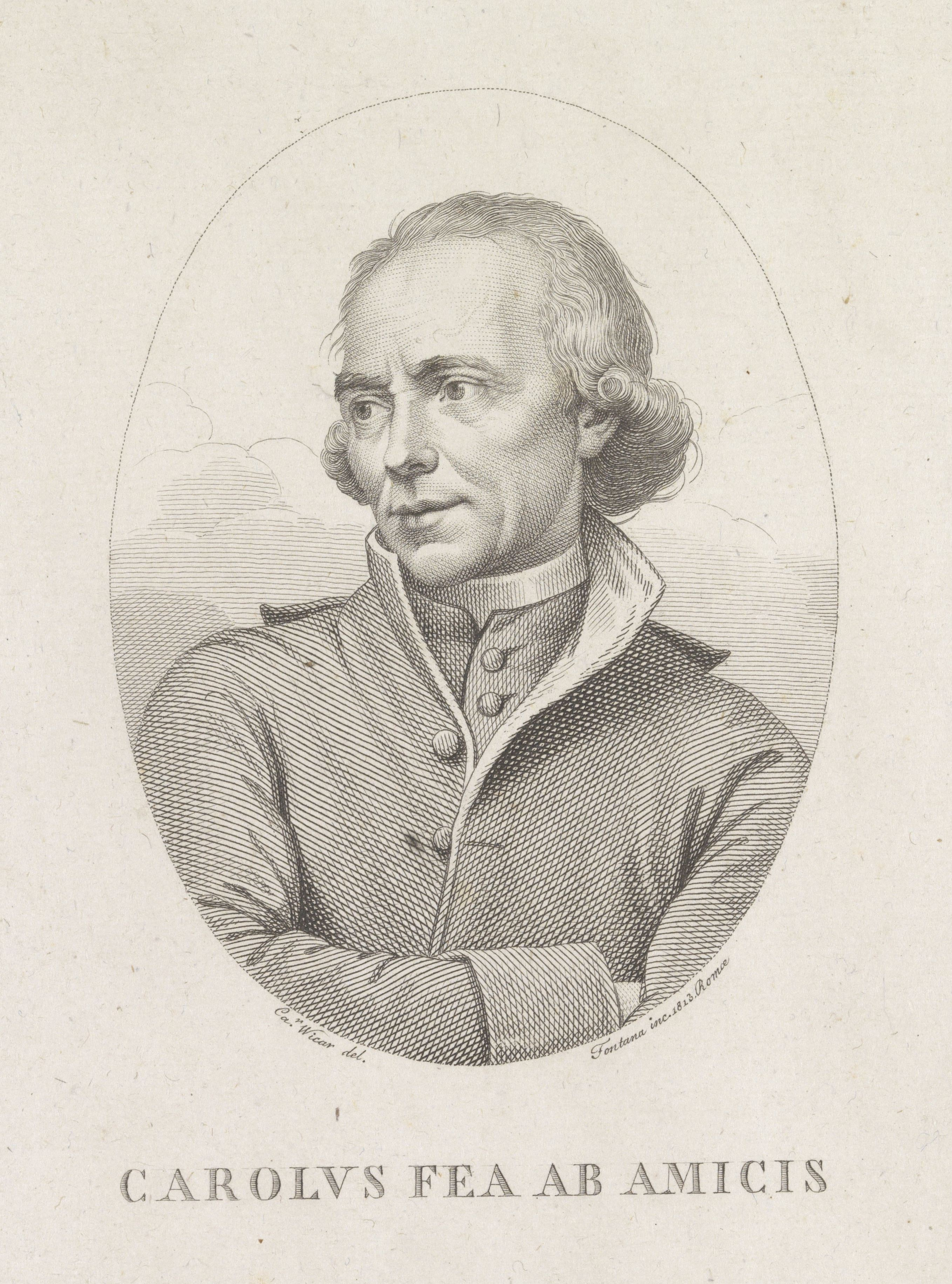
- Born: 4 June 1753; Pigna
- Died: 18 March 1836 (aged 82); Rome, Papal States
- Alma mater: Sapienza University of Rome; Pontifical Gregorian University
- Occupation: Art historian, archaeologist, classical archaeologist, jurist, Catholic priest

Carlo Fea (4 June 1753 — 18 March 1836) was an Italian archaeologist.

== Biography ==
Born at Pigna, in Liguria, Fea studied law in Rome, receiving the degree of doctor of laws from the university of La Sapienza, but archaeology gradually attracted his attention, and with the view of obtaining better opportunities for his research in 1798 he took Holy Orders and became an Abbott. For political reasons he was forced to take refuge in Florence; on his return to Rome in 1799 he was imprisoned as a Jacobin by the Neapolitans, who at that time were occupying Rome, but was shortly afterwards freed and appointed Commissario delle Antichità and librarian to Prince Sigismondo Chigi. At Rome in 1781 Fea discovered a statue of a discus thrower, the so-called "Discobolus", one of the known Roman copies of the famous Greek original statue in bronze created by Myron.

Fea helped frame legislation to control the trade in, and excavation of, the antiquities of Rome, and undertook archaeological work on the Pantheon and the Forum there.

Fea revised and annotated an Italian translation of Johann Joachim Winckelmann's Geschichte der Kunst, and also annotated some of the works of Giovanni Ludovico Bianconi. Among his original writings he is best known for: Miscellanea filologica, critica, e antiquaria; and Descrizione di Roma Antica e Moderna.

Despite being qualified to do so, Fea never used the title of Abbott but rather that of a lawyer (Avv).

He died in Rome on the night of March 17, 1836, in the Palazzo Chigi.

== Works ==
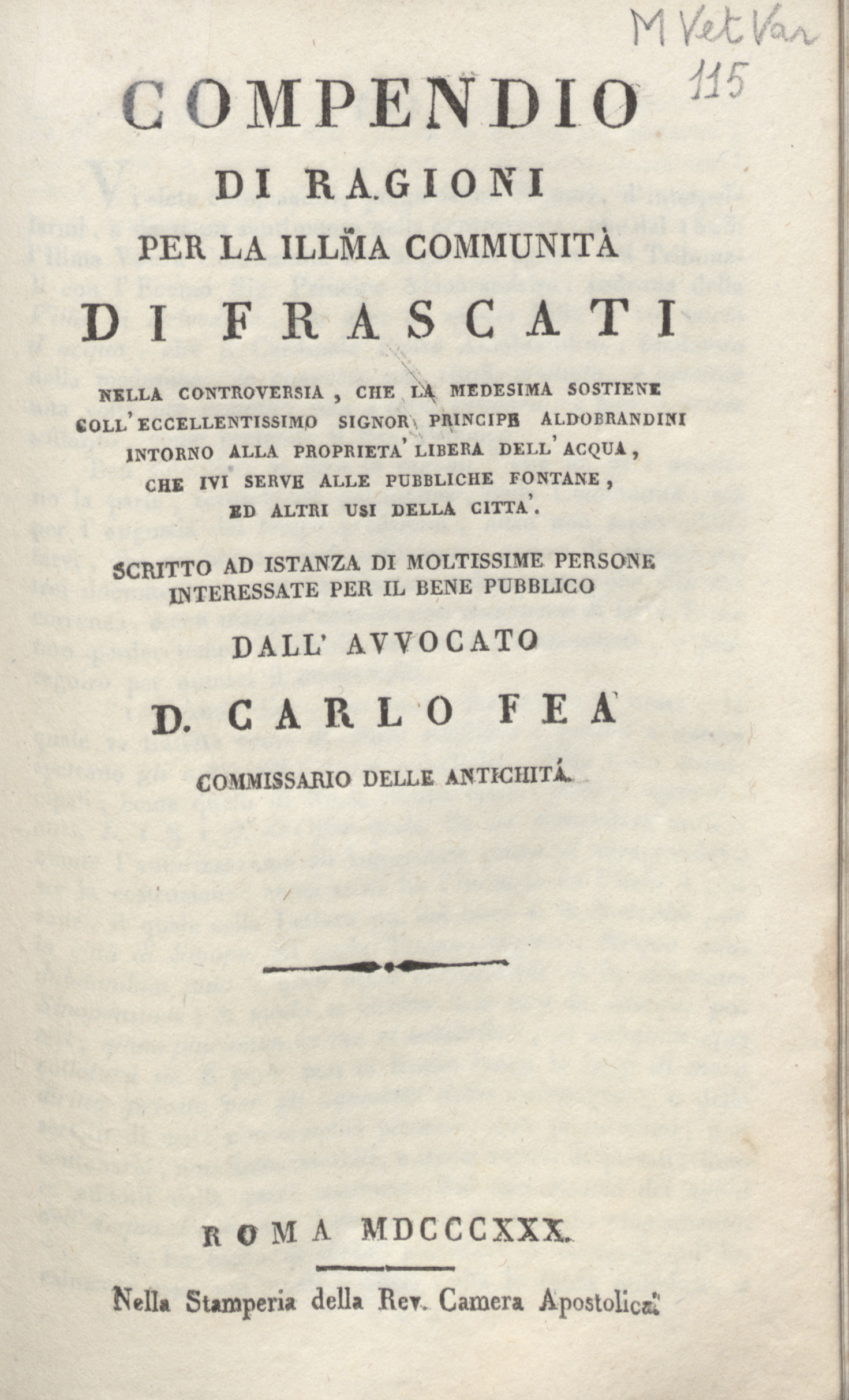
Compendio di ragioni per la illustrissima communità di Frascati (1830)

- Vindiciae et observationes iuris: volumen primum, 1782
- Descrizione Dei Circhi, Particolarmente Di Quello Di Caracalla E Dei Giuochi In Essi Celebrati: Opera Postuma Del Consigliere Gio. Lodovico Bianconi Ordinata E Pubblicata Con Note E Versione Francese Dall'Avvocato Carlo Fea E Corredata Di Tavole In Rame Rettificate E Compite Su La Faccia Del Luogo Dall'Architetto Angelo Uggeri Milanese, 1789
- Miscellanea filologica critica e antiquaria, Tomo primo, 1790
- Discorso intorno alle belle arti in Roma, 1797
- Osservazioni sui monumenti delle belle arti che rappresentano Leda, 1802
- Relazione di un viaggio ad Ostia e alla villa de Plinio detta Laurentino, 1802
- Dissertazioni epistolari di G. B. Visconti e Filippo Waquier de la Barthe sopra la statua del Discobolo scoperta nella villa Palombara; con le illustrazioni della medesima pubblicate da Carlo Fea e Giuseppe Ant. Guattani; e coll'aggiunta delle illustrazioni di altri due discoboli dissotterrati nella via Appia e nella villa Adriana, prodotte da Ennio Quirino Visconti; raccolte ed arricchite con note e con le bizarre iscrizioni della villa Palombara da Francesco Cancellieri, 1806
- L'integrità del Panteon di M. Agrippa ora S. Maria ad Martyres rivendicata al principato..., 1807
- Ragionamento sopra le Terme Tauriane, il Tempio di Venere e Roma il Foro di Domiziano e d'Augusto ec. con una tavola in rame, 1811
- Osservazioni intorno alla celebre statua detta di Pompeo: lette il 10. di settembre nell'Accademia Romana d'archeologia, 1812
- Iscrizioni di monumenti pubblici trovate nelle attuali escavationi dei medesimi, 1813
- Ammonizioni critico-antiquarie a varii scrittori del giorno, 1813
- Osservazioni sull Arena e sul Podio dell'Anfiteatro Flavio dopo gli scavi nel medesimo, 1813
- Nuove osservazioni intorno all'arena dell'anfiteatro Flavio e all'acqua, che ora la ricopre, 1814
- Nuova descrizione de' monumenti antichi ed oggetti d'arte contenute nel Vaticano e nel Campidoglio, 1819
- Novelle del Tevere: discorso particolarmente in difesa di S. Gregorio Magno, 1819
- L' integrità del Panteon rivendicata a Marco Agrippa dall'avvocato Carlo Fea commissario delle antichità, 1820
- Frammenti di Fasti Consolari e Trionfali Ultimatemente Scoperti nel Foro Romano e Altrove Ora Riuniti e Presentati alla Santità di N. S. Pio Papa Settimo, 1820
- Pius II. Pont. Max. a calumniis vindicatus. Ternis retractationibus eius quibus dicta et scripta contra Eugenium PP. IV. eiuravit, 1823
- Varietà di notizie economiche, fisiche, antiquarie sopra Castel Gandolfo, Albano, Ariccia, Nemo loro laghi ed emissarii, sopra scavi recenti di antiquità in Roma e nei contorni etc, 1820
- La fossa Traiana, 1824
- Considerazioni storiche fisiche geologiche idrauliche architettoniche economiche critiche dell'Avvocato Carlo Fea ... sul disastro accaduto in Tivoli il dì 16 novembre 1826 colle quali si illustrano anche la storia naturale del paese e varie antichità, 1827
- Indicazione del Foro Romano e sue principali adiacenze relativa alla contemporanea tavola incisa in rame onde averne qualche idea per lo scavo ordinato nello stesso Foro dalla S. di NS Papa Leone XII nel settembre 1827 con tavola grande incisa in rame, 1827
- Nuove osservazioni sopra la Divina Commedia, 1830
- Storia dei vasi fittili dipinti che da 4 anni si trovano nello Stato Ecclesiastico in quella parte che è nell'antica Etruria: colla relazione della colonia Lidia che li fece per più secoli prima del Dominio dei Romani; Discorso dell'avv. D. Carlo Fea ... diretto all'Instituto di corrispondenza ..., 1832
- I Reclami del Foro Trajano esposti al pubblico e giustificati, 1832
- Supplemento allo scritto finora da molti sul celebre musaico scoperto nelle ruine di Pompei: Li 24. Ottobre 1831 dal avvocato Carlo Fea, 1833
- Jos. Benetti Romani Diss. de Cursu Publico - Compendio storico delle poste specialmente romane antiche e moderne, 1834
- Il diritto sovrano della santa sede sopra le valli di Comacchio e sopra la repubblica di San Marino difeso dall'avvocato Carlo Fea, 1834
- Miscellanea filologica critica e antiquaria tomo II, 1836
- Compendio di ragioni per la illustrissima communità di Frascati nella controversia, che la medesima sostiene coll'eccellentissimo signor principe Aldobrandini intorno alla proprietà libera dell'acqua, che ivi serve alle pubbliche fontane, ed altri usi della città . Scritto ad istanza di moltissime persone interessate per il bene pubblico dall'Avvocato D. Carlo Fea commissario delle antichità. Roma: nella Stamperia della Rev. Camera Apostolica. 1830.
