= Bianconi =

Bianconi is an Italian surname. Notable people with the surname include:

- Carlo Bianconi (1732–1802), Italian painter, sculptor and architect
- Charles Bianconi (1786–1875), Irish businessman
- Diego Bianconi (born 1957), Swiss painter
- Franca Bianconi (born 1962), Italian figure skater and coach
- Ginestra Bianconi, Italian network scientist
- Giovanni Giuseppe Bianconi (1809–1878), Italian zoologist, herpetologist, botanist and geologist
- Giovanni Ludovico Bianconi (1717–1781), Italian doctor and antiquarian
- Marcelo Bianconi (1956–2025), Brazilian journalist
- Miguel Bianconi (born 1992), Brazilian footballer
- Niko Bianconi (born 1991), Italian footballer
- Philippe Bianconi (born 1960), French classical pianist
- Roberta Bianconi (born 1989), Italian water polo player
- Stefano Bianconi (born 1968), Italian footballer
