= Alcohol (horse) =

Australian-bred Thoroughbred racehorse

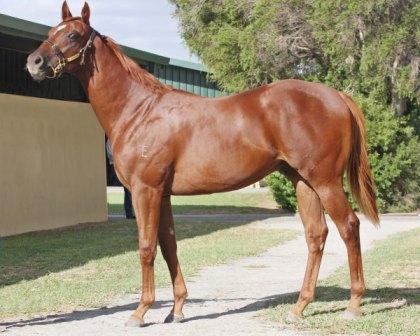
- Alcohol
- Sire: Bianconi (USA)
- Grandsire: Danzig (USA)
- Dam: Tendue (AUS)
- Damsire: General Nediym (AUS)
- Sex: Gelding
- Foaled: 16 September 2008
- Country: Australia
- Colour: Chestnut
- Breeder: Lauriston Thoroughbred Farm, Corinella, Victoria
- Trainer: Richard Jolly
- Record: 25: 6–4–6
- Earnings: $323,630
- Last updated on 26 Nov 2014

Alcohol (foaled 16 September 2008) is a retired Australian Thoroughbred racehorse who was trained by Richard Jolly at Morphettville in South Australia. Sporting blue silks with a pink fleurs-de-lys and yellow sleeves, Alcohol was a favourite with the punters in South Australia.

== Breeding ==
He was foaled in Australia at Lauriston Thoroughbred Farm, Corinella, Victoria.

== Racing career ==
The current racing record of Alcohol is 25 starts for 6 wins, 4 seconds and 6 thirds for earnings of A$323,630.

=== Two-year-old season ===
Alcohol started racing as a two-year-old on 20 July 2011 in a race at Balaklava, finishing 3rd, prior to spelling.

=== Three-year-old season ===
Alcohol continued his racing career as a three-year-old, and broke his maiden with a win on his 5th race at Moonee Valley Racecourse on 16 December 2011, and competed in Group 1 South Australian Derby on 5 May 2012.

=== Four-year-old season ===
Alcohol commenced his four-year-old season winning 3 out of his first 4 starts, with a first up win on the Morpettville Parks track on 27 October 2012, and continued on by travelling to Victoria to win at Flemington on 15 December 2012.

=== Five-year-old season ===
Alcohol was only lightly raced as a five-year-old, running only 2 races after a lengthy spell.

=== Six-year-old season ===
Returning at Morphettville over 1200m, he returned to the winner circle in his first up race back.

== Race record ==
2010–11 season as a two-year-old
Result	Date	Race	Venue	Group	Distance	Weight (kg)	Jockey	Winner/2nd
3-12	20 Jul 2011		Balaklava	2yo Maiden	1055 m	56.5	T. Pannell	1-Medahlia 1:03.11

2011–12 season as a three-year-old
Result	Date	Race	Venue	Group	Distance	Weight (kg)	Jockey	Winner/2nd
5-10	1 Nov 2011		Morphettville Racecourse	3yo Maiden	1050 m	56.5	L. Hopwood	1-Hot Lover 1:01.42
2-14	16 Nov 2011		Gawler Racecourse	3yo+ Maiden	1200 m	57.0	P. Gatt	1-Independent Air 1:11.87
2-14	3 Dec 2011		Morphettville Parks	0-75	1400 m	55.0	P. Gatt	1-Zaeimus 1:24.52
1-10	16 Dec 2011	Styletread Handicap	Moonee Valley Racecourse	3yo Open	1600 m	54.0	D. Yendall	2 Soaked 1:36.5
8-9	12 Mar 2012		Morphettville Racecourse	0-75	1200 m	57.5	P. Gatt	1 Jeunealistic 1:11.9
8-16	31 Mar 2012		Morphettville Racecourse	3yo Open	1600 m	57.0	P. Gatt	1 Rock Culture 1:36.9
8-14	14 Apr 2012	Port Adelaide Guineas	Morphettville Racecourse	Listed	1800 m	57.5	P. Gatt	1 Cornell 1:49.8
2-16	28 Apr 2012	Chairman's Stakes	Morphettville Racecourse	Group 3	2000 m	57.5	P. Gatt	1 Heaven's Riches 2:07.2
7-16	5 May 2012	South Australian Derby	Morphettville Racecourse	Group 1	2500 m	56.5	P. Gatt	1 Zabeelionaire (NZ) 2:42.1

2012–13 season as a four-year old
Result	Date	Race	Venue	Group	Distance	Weight (kg)	Jockey	Winner/2nd
1-9	27 Oct 2012		Morphettville Parks	CG&E 0-75	1400 m	58.5	C. Lever	2. Zakumi 1:24.32
5-7	17 Nov 2012		Morphettville Parks	0 - 86	1400 m	56.0	C. Lever	1 Fast And Free 1:23.78
1-6	1 Dec 2012		Morphettville Racecourse	Restricted 94	1600 m	54.0	J. Holder	2. Verco Road 1:37.44
1-8	15 Dec 2012	Spotless Handicap	Flemington Racecourse	Handicap	2000 m	54.0	D. Dunn	2. Dark Note 2:02.88
8-8	1 Jan 2013		Flemington Racecourse	Handicap	2000 m	57.0	S. Arnold	1. Tuscan Fire 2:00.9

2013–14 season as a five-year old
Result	Date	Race	Venue	Group	Distance	Weight (kg)	Jockey	Winner/2nd
5-12	26 Dec 2013	Schweppes Fly Hcp	Morphettville Racecourse		1100 m	57.0	M. Nielsen	1. Essay Raider 1:03.41
3-12	18 Jan 2014		Morphettville Racecourse		1550 m	56.0	P. Gatt	1. Pull No Punches 1:33.99

2014–15 season as a six-year-old
Result	Date	Race	Venue	Group	Distance	Weight (kg)	Jockey	Winner/2nd
1-6	13 Sep 2014	Tattsbet (Bm90)	Morphettville Racecourse	BM 90	1200 m	59.0 (cd 57.0)	J. Toeroek	2. Cellarmaster 1:10.33
6-13	28 Sep 2014	Gawler Cup	Gawler Racecourse	Open	1500 m	60.5 (cd 59.0)	Ms K. Cross	1. Boristar 1:29.99
3-10	25 Oct 2014	Mac Just Over Don't Drive (Bm90)	Morphettville Parks	BM 90	1400 m	60.5 (cd 58.5)	J. Toeroek	1. Boristar 1:24.28
3-14	8 Nov 2014	Antler Luggage Hcp (96)	Flemington Racecourse	0-96	1600 m	57.5	J. Bowman	1. Saint Or Sinner 1:36.47
3-13	29 Nov 2014	Sportingbet By W Hill (Bm96)	Moonee Valley Racecourse	Bm96	2040 m	58.0	S. Arnold	1. Schockemohle 2:05.74
2-9	9 May 2015	Peter Elberg Funerals (Bm90)	Morphettville Racecourse	Bm90	1200 m	59.0	J. Toeroek	1. Mubakkir 1:10.46
3-10	23 May 2015	Hamilton Holden Hcp)	Morphettville Parks	Open	1250 m	57.5	J. Toeroek	1. Underestimation 1:13.95
1-10	20 Jun 2015	T Harrison Cup	Moonee Valley Racecourse	Open Hcp	1600 m	56.0	D. Dunn	2 Sadaqa 1:38.53

== Pedigree ==
Pedigree of Alcohol (Aus), Chestnut Gelding 2008
Sire Bianconi (USA)	Danzig (USA); 1977	Northern Dancer (Can); 1961	Nearctic (Can)
Sire Bianconi (USA)	Danzig (USA); 1977	Northern Dancer (Can); 1961	Natalma (USA)
Sire Bianconi (USA)	Danzig (USA); 1977	Pas de Nom (USA); 1968	Admiral's Voyage (USA)
Sire Bianconi (USA)	Danzig (USA); 1977	Pas de Nom (USA); 1968	Petitioner (GB)
Sire Bianconi (USA)	Fall Aspen (USA)	Pretense (USA)	Endeavour II (Arg)
Sire Bianconi (USA)	Fall Aspen (USA)	Pretense (USA)	Imitation (GB)
Sire Bianconi (USA)	Fall Aspen (USA)	Change Water (USA)	Swaps (USA)
Sire Bianconi (USA)	Fall Aspen (USA)	Change Water (USA)	Portage (USA)
Dam Tendue (Aus)	General Nediym (Aus)	Nediym (Ire)	Shareef Dancer (USA)
Dam Tendue (Aus)	General Nediym (Aus)	Nediym (Ire)	Nilmeen (Fr)
Dam Tendue (Aus)	General Nediym (Aus)	Military Belle (Aus)	Without Fear (Fr)
Dam Tendue (Aus)	General Nediym (Aus)	Military Belle (Aus)	Reticella (NZ)
Dam Tendue (Aus)	Marie Rambert (Ire)	Common Grounds (GB)	Kris (GB)
Dam Tendue (Aus)	Marie Rambert (Ire)	Common Grounds (GB)	Sweetly (Fr)
Dam Tendue (Aus)	Marie Rambert (Ire)	Ninette de Valois (Fr)	Gay Mecene (USA)
Dam Tendue (Aus)	Marie Rambert (Ire)	Ninette de Valois (Fr)	Martinova (Ire)
