= Jessica Barson =

American neuroscientist

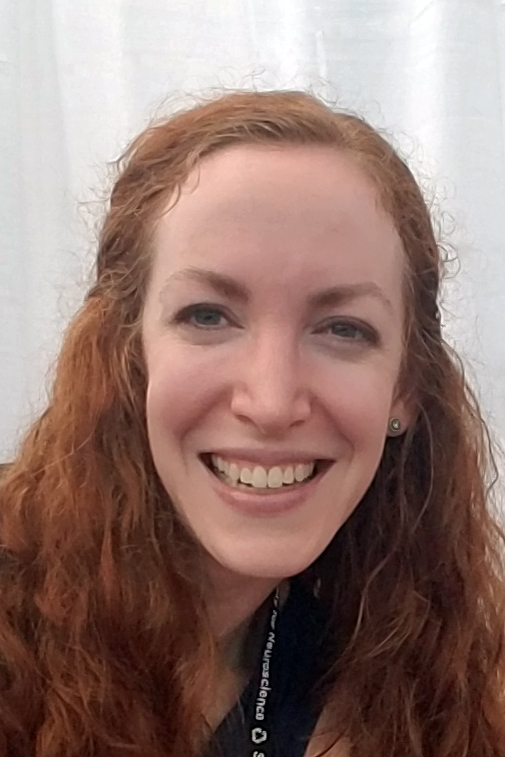
- Education: Columbia University, Princeton University
- Known for: Neurobiological basis of alcohol consumption and fat intake
- Scientific career
- Fields: Neuroscience
- Workplaces: Drexel University College of Medicine

Jessica Barson is an American neuroscientist and associate professor at Drexel University College of Medicine. Barson investigates neuropeptide signaling in the paraventricular nucleus of the thalamus as well as the nucleus accumbens to understand the neurobiological basis of addiction and elucidate targets for therapy.

== Early life and education ==
From an early age, Barson was interested in the brain. She pursued her undergraduate studies in psychology at Columbia College, Columbia University. During her time at Columbia, Barson worked in the lab of Geraldine Downey as a research assistant studying social psychology and developmental psychopathology. During the later part of her time at Columbia, Barson worked in the lab of Jon Horvitz studying the neurobiological basis of learning and memory. Barson earned her B.A. and graduated summa cum laude from Columbia in 2000 as a member of the Phi Beta Kappa honors society. After her research experiences at Columbia, Barson pursued a Post-Baccalaureate Pre-Medical Program at Columbia, where she continued to work in research as a technician and research assistant at the New York State Psychiatric Institute until 2003.

Barson pursued her master's degree and graduate research in neuroscience and psychology at Princeton University in 2004. Under the mentorship of Bart G. Hoebel, she studied the regulation of alcohol intake by dietary fat and fat-stimulated neuropeptides. In 2006, Barson earned her Master of Arts in Psychology and Neuroscience, and then in 2009, Barson earned her Ph.D in Psychology and Neuroscience.

Following her graduate training, Barson moved to New York City to complete her postdoctoral research training at The Rockefeller University in behavioral neurobiology in 2009. Barson worked under the mentorship of Sarah Fryer Leibowitz continuing to study the role of opioids and orexin in ethanol consumption and feeding. Barson completed her postdoctoral studies in 2014.

=== Alcohol consumption and dietary fat intake ===
During graduate school, Barson explored the relationship between alcohol consumption and fat metabolism to understand how the mechanisms that control reward or food intake may also regulate alcohol consumption. There exists a positive behavioral feedback loop with fat consumption such that fat intake leads to increased consummatory behavior due to orexin and opioid release in the brain. Barson probed the mechanisms of this positive feedback loop during alcohol consumption. She found that ethanol could substitute for fat in this positive feedback loop and that decreasing circulating lipid levels leads to decreased ethanol intake. Barson explored this interconnectivity between fat and ethanol metabolism and their impacts on behavior. Barson found that ethanol increases the same fat-stimulated neuropeptides, orexin and opioids, in the brain and the more ethanol they voluntarily consume, the higher the expression level of these neuropeptides. Further, she found that decreases in ethanol consumption decreased expression of orexin. Probing the effects of opioids on consummatory behavior, Barson injected opioids into brain regions involved in feeding and reward and found increases in alcohol consumption and increases in dopaminergic release in the nucleus accumbens, typically involved in reward behavior.

Barson's work highlighted novel mechanisms driving alcohol intake which create future opportunities for development of targeted strategies to prevent alcohol abuse. In Barson's paper published in the journal Alcohol, Barson shows a strategy to interrupt the vicious cycle between fat and alcohol, where consumption of the two synergistically acts to drive brain processes that drive further consumption. Since both fat and alcohol appear to increase blood triglyceride levels, Barson administered a triglyceride lowering drug called Gemfibrozil which caused a significant reduction in orexigenic peptide and reduced ethanol intake.

=== Neural basis of feeding and reward ===
During her postdoctoral studies at Rockefeller, Barson followed up on her graduate work, exploring mechanistically the regulation of neuropeptides in the regulation of addiction and food consumption. Previous studies showed that, just like the opioid enkephalin, galanin and orexin are also stimulated by dietary fats. Barson and her team explored which areas of the hypothalamic paraventricular nucleus (PVN) are specifically stimulated by high-fat diets as well as exploring whether the ligands or receptors for galanin and orexin are over-expressed in these areas. Barson found strong overlap in galanin expressing cells and enkephalin expressing cells in the medial PVN of rats fed a high-fat diet but not rats fed normal chow. Further, they found the same pattern in co-expression of orexin receptor 2 and enkephalin after high-fat diet in a region immediately posterior to the medial PVN. These findings show how non-opioid peptides might interacti with opioid signaling in high-fat diets to mediate increased consummatory behavior.

Barson also explored how individual variability can account for differences in consummatory behavior. Since alcoholism and other addictive disorders show significant variability in both propensity towards addiction and effects of treatments, it is essential to probe the underlying biology of these differences in order to better treat addiction in the fashion of personalized medicine. They first identified subgroups of ethanol-naive rats based on two measures known to predispose individuals to high ethanol consumption; high novelty-induced activity and high-fat-induced triglycerides. Barson and her colleagues then trained these rats to drink ethanol and observed that high activity rats had both increased alcohol intake as well as increased levels of galanin and enkephalin in the PVN as well as increased orexin in the perifornical lateral hypothalamus (PFLH). In the high-triglyceride rats, they found greater expression in the PVN but reduced orexin in the PFLH showing that while the two predicted high ethanol consumption groups exhibited high alcohol consumption, the endogenous peptide and drug responses markedly differed.

== Career and research ==
Barson was recruited in 2015, after one year of postdoctoral research, to Drexel University College of Medicine as an assistant professor and started her lab in the Department of Neurobiology and Anatomy. Barson was simultaneously promoted to Adjunct Faculty at The Rockefeller University in 2015, a position she held until 2017 while starting her lab at Drexel. At Drexel, Barson's research program centered around studying the neural basis of addiction, with a focus on neuropeptidergic actions within the limbic system and their specific role in alcohol use disorder and binge-eating disorder. In addition to conducting research and teaching, Barson is an editor for Frontiers in Systems Neuroscience, Frontiers in Neuroscience, and previously Frontiers in Psychology. She is also a guest editor for Frontiers in Behavioral Neuroscience and Brain Research.

=== Paraventricular nucleus of the thalamus and consummatory behavior ===
The paraventricular nucleus of the thalamus (PVT) is a markedly understudied brain region found to be implicated in hedonic feeding behavior. Barson became interested in exploring the role of this region in drug and ethanol consumption due to the orexin projections it receives from the hypothalamus and its high level of orexin receptor expression. When rats consumed alcohol, Barson found increases in anterior PVT neuron activity, as indicated by immediate early gene c-Fos immunolabeling. These same cells also showed increased expression of oxytocin receptor 2 and when orexin receptor 2 was inhibited in the anterior PVT, this led to decreased ethanol consumption, and this was not seen with inhibition of orexin receptor 1. These results highlighted a highly specific anatomical and molecular substrate for ethanol intake; orexin receptor 2 signaling in the anterior PVT.

Since the PVT appeared to play a role in alcohol consumption behavior, Barson was interested in exploring the role of this area in emotional processing. They found that overall the anterior PVT was implicated in locomotion, but it appeared to have an enhanced role in novelty-induced activity and anxiety-like behavior, implicating its role in the emotional response to stressful stimuli.

Barson and her colleagues then started exploring the relationship between behavioral predictors of high ethanol consumption and neurotensin (NT) levels in the PVT. They found that rats exhibiting high levels of rearing were high ethanol consumers, and had lower levels of NT in the posterior PVT compared to rats with moderate levels of rearing. Further, they showed that NTS appeared to be low in prone rats, and alcohol consumption did not change NTS levels compared to non-prone rats implicating NTS in mediating high alcohol drinking behavior. To causally probe this hypothesis, they injected NTS into the posterior PVT and found decreases in ethanol drinking as well as decreases in rearing. Their findings directly support the idea that low levels of NTS in the posterior PVT support excessive alcohol consumption.

Recently, the Barson lab implicated pituitary adenylate cyclase-activating polypeptide (PACAP) and its protein isoform, PACAP-27, in regulation of alcohol consumption in the PVT. Alcohol drinking led to an increase in PACAP expression, specifically in the posterior portion of the PVT. Barson's findings have highlighted another way in which the PVT may function in the pathogenesis of alcohol consumptive behaviors.

=== Science communication and advocacy ===
Barson is dedicated to science communication and advocacy. Her work has been brought to public attention via LiveScience and the Inquirer, where she describes how her findings lead to an increased understanding of the connection between alcohol consumption and binge eating, as well as alcohol consumption and the reliability of memory. Further, Barson participates in local science communication initiatives such as the Taste of Science, where she speaks about her work to the public, educating them on why we might choose unhealthy options to snack on after binge drinking rather than healthy options. Barson is also actively involved in advocating for gender equity in academia. As a member of the Society for Neuroscience and as a mother in science, Barson was invited to speak at the “Fixing the Leaky Pipeline for Women in Science” annual meeting discussing the issues facing new mothers in academia.

== Awards and honors ==
- 2019 Mentoring Award, Faculty Department of Neurobiology & Anatomy
- 2019 Early Career Women Faculty Leadership Development Seminar (EWIS) AAMC
- 2018 Commonwealth Universal Research Enhancement (CURE) formula grant program
- 2012 NIH Pathway to Independence (PI) Award (K99/R00) NIAAA
- 2012 Research Society on Alcoholism Junior Investigator Award NIAAA
- 2006/7 Psychology Department Award for Excellence in Teaching – Princeton University

== Selected publications ==
- Pandey S, Badve PS, Curtis GR, Leibowitz SF & Barson JR (2019). Neurotensin in the posterior thalamic paraventricular nucleus: Inhibitor of pharmacologically-relevant ethanol drinking. Addiction Biology, 24(1), 3–16.
- Gupta A*, Gargiulo AT*, Curtis G, Badve PS, Pandey S & Barson JR (2018). Pituitary adenylate cyclase-activating polypeptide-27 (PACAP-27) in the thalamic paraventricular nucleus is stimulated by ethanol drinking. Alcoholism: Clinical and Experimental Research, 42(9), 1650–60.
- Barson JR, Poon K, Ho HT, Alam M, Sanzalone L & Leibowitz SF (2017). Substance P in the anterior thalamic paraventricular nucleus: Role in ethanol drinking in relation to orexin from the hypothalamus. Addiction Biology, 22(1), 58–69.
- Barson JR & Leibowitz SF (2015). GABA-induced inactivation of dorsal midline thalamic subregions has distinct effects on emotional behavior. Neuroscience Letters, 609 (16 November 2015), 92–6.
- Barson JR, Ho HT & Leibowitz SF (2015). Anterior thalamic paraventricular nucleus is involved in intermittent access ethanol drinking: Role of orexin receptor 2. Addiction Biology, 20(3), 469–81.
- Barson JR, Fagan SE, Chang G-Q & Leibowitz SF (2013). Neurochemical heterogeneity of rats predicted by different measures to be high ethanol consumers. Alcoholism: Clinical and Experimental Research, 37(S1), E141–51.
- Barson JR, Karatayev O, Gaysinskaya O, Chang G-Q & Leibowitz SF (2012). Effect of dietary fatty acid composition on food intake, triglycerides, and hypothalamic peptides. Regulatory Peptides, 173(1–3), 13–20.
- Barson JR, Chang G-Q, Poon K, Morganstern I & Leibowitz SF (2011). Galanin and the orexin 2 receptor as possible regulators of enkephalin in the PVN: Relation to dietary fat. Neuroscience, 193, 10–20.
- Barson JR, Carr AJ, Sound JE, Sobhani NC, Leibowitz SF & Hoebel BG (2010). Opioids in the hypothalamic paraventricular nucleus stimulate ethanol intake. Alcoholism: Clinical and Experimental Research, 34(2), 214–22.
- Barson JR, Carr AJ, Sound JE, Sobhani NC, Leibowitz SF & Hoebel BG (2009). Opioids in the nucleus accumbens stimulate ethanol intake. Physiology & Behavior, 98(4), 453–9.
- Barson JR, Karatayev O, Chang G-Q, Johnson DF, Bocarsly ME, Hoebel BG & Leibowitz SF (2009). Positive relationship between dietary fat, ethanol intake, triglycerides, and hypothalamic peptides: Counteraction by lipid-lowering drugs. Alcohol, 42(6), 433–41.
