= Barnson =

Barnson is a surname. Notable people with the surname include:

- Matthew Barnson (born 1979), American composer
- Murray Barnson Emeneau (1904–2005), American linguist

== See also ==
- Barson
