= Barson =

Barson is a surname. Notable people with the surname include:

- Chad Barson (born 1991), American soccer player
- Frank Barson (1891–1968), English footballer
- Jessica Barson, American neuroscientist
- Mike Barson (born 1958), British musician

== See also ==
- Barnson
- Carson (surname)
