= Carlo Bianconi =

Italian painter

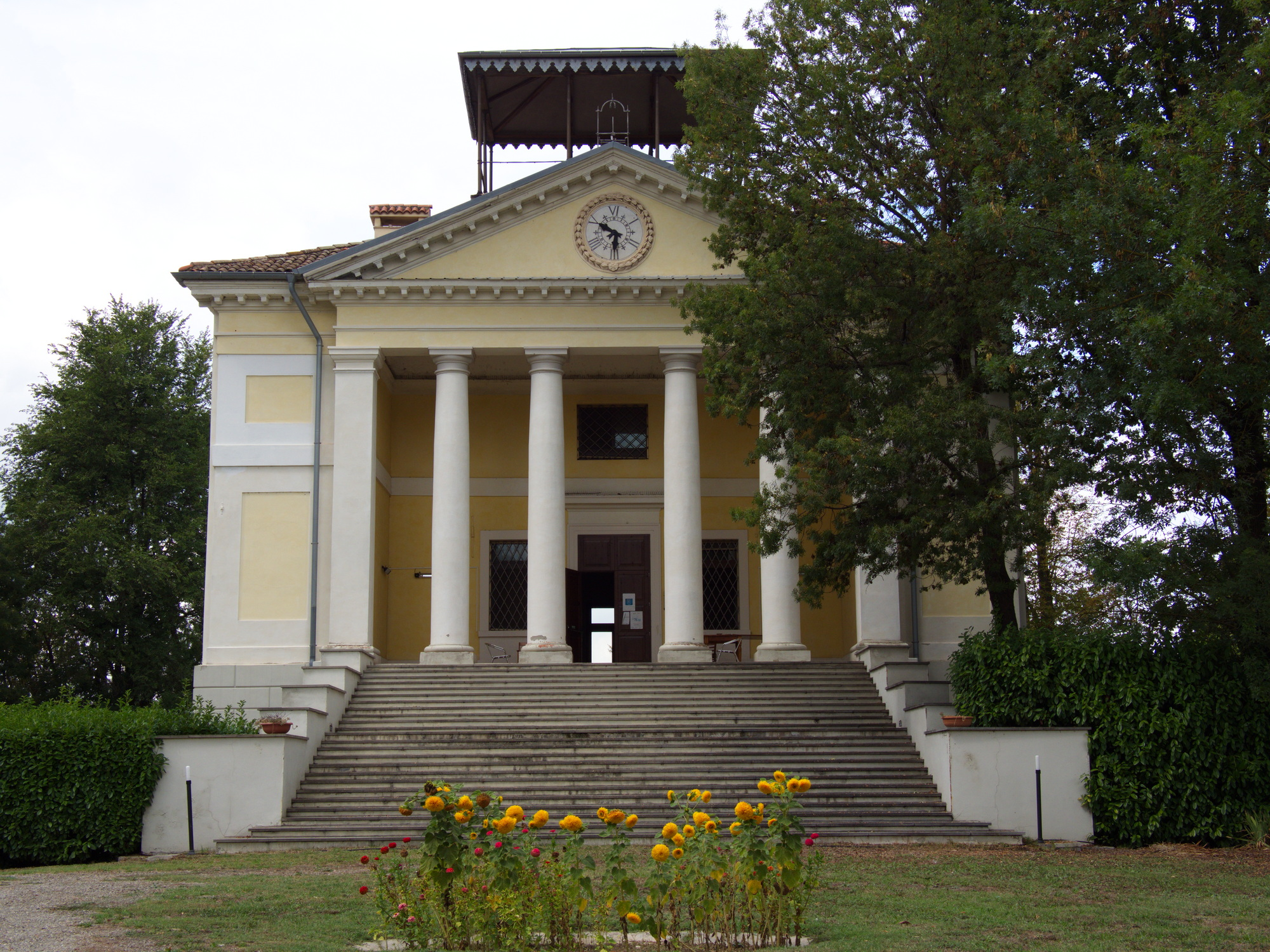
Villa Bianconi Rusconi Bassi in Crespellano, Italy

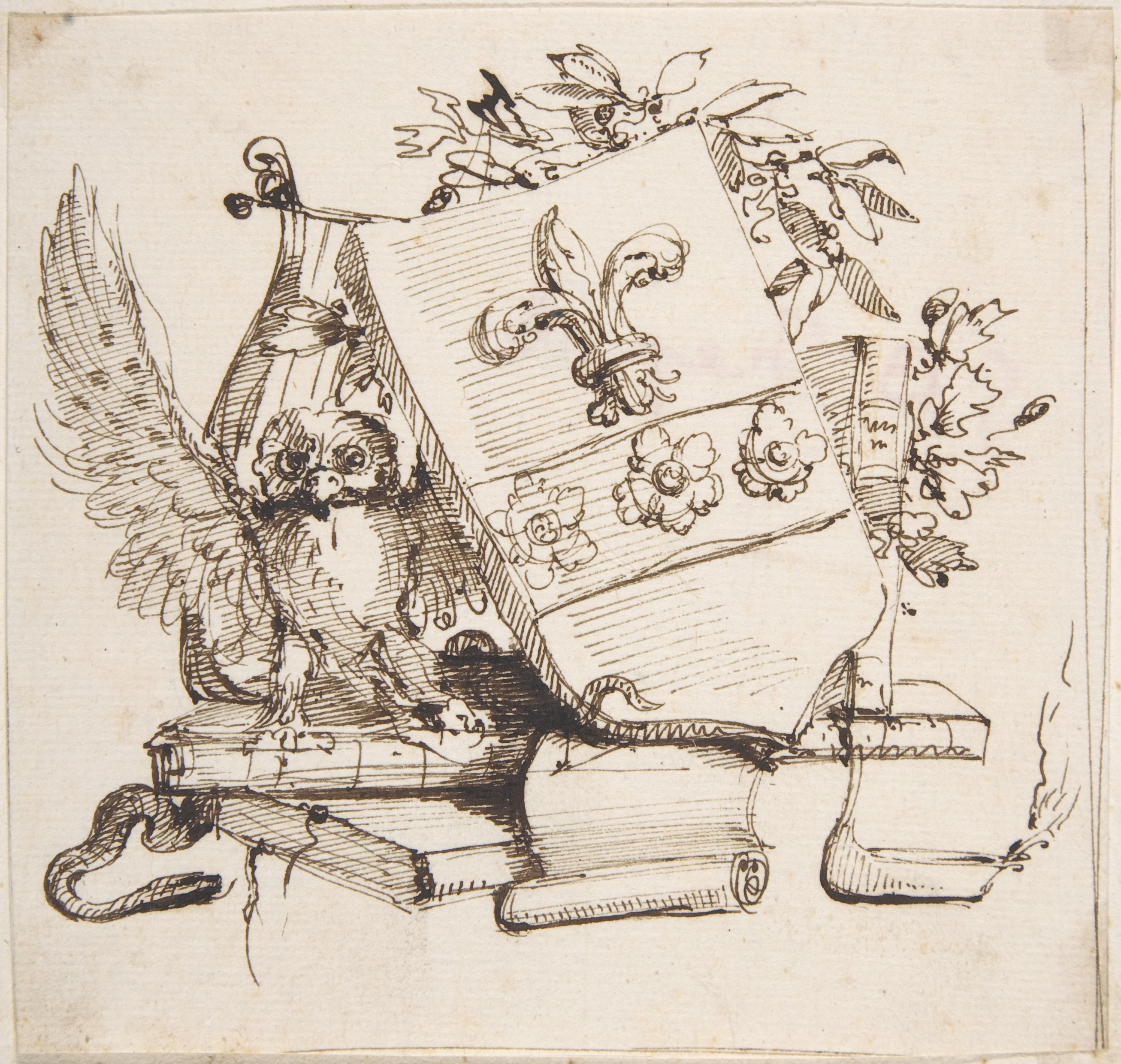
Decorated Coat of Arms by Carlo Bianconi

Carlo Bianconi (1732 – August 15, 1802) was an Italian painter, engraver, and architect.

== Biography ==
He trained in Bologna with Ercole Graziani the Younger in Bologna. He created many engravings of antiquities. In Bologna, he worked with Mauro Tesi in designing a monument to their patron, Count Francesco Algarotti.

He was a member of the Accademia Clementina, but moved to Milan in 1778 and became secretary of the Brera Academy for twenty years. he had helped edit Malvasia's guide to Bologna. In 1787, he published a Guide to Arts and Antiquities in Milan. He died in Milan.

His brother Giovanni Ludovico Bianconi, was a neoclassical doctor, art historian, and antiquarian, who was a close friend of Winckelmann.

== Note ==
- Myers claims Giovanni Ludovico was Carlo's father. Carlo Bianconi does not appear to be closely related to Charles Bianconi.
