= Alcohol-free =

Alcohol-free may refer to:

- Non-alcoholic drink, a version of an alcoholic drink made without alcohol
- Alcohol-free zone, that prohibit the consumption of alcohol
- Teetotalism, abstinence from alcohol
- "Alcohol-Free", a song by South Korean girl group Twice
- Alcohol Free (horse) (foaled 2018), a racehorse

== See also ==
- Abstinence#Alcohol
- Temperance bar, or alcohol-free bar
- Temperance movement, promoting abstinence from alcohol
