= Alcohol (journal) =

- Discipline: Addiction medicine
- Language: English
- Edited by: Doug Matthews

Publication details
- History: 1984–present
- Publisher: Elsevier
- Frequency: 9/year
- Impact factor: 2.90 (2024)

Standard abbreviations
- ISO 4: Alcohol

Indexing
- CODEN: ALCOEX
- ISSN: 0741-8329 (print); 1873-6823 (web)

Links
- Journal homepage; Online access; Online archive

Alcohol is a peer-reviewed medical journal covering research on the health effects of alcohol consumption. It was established in 1984 and is published nine times per year by Elsevier. The editor-in-chief is Doug Matthews (University of Wisconsin–Eau Claire). According to the Journal Citation Reports, the journal has a 2024 impact factor of 2.90.
