= Giovanni Ludovico Bianconi =

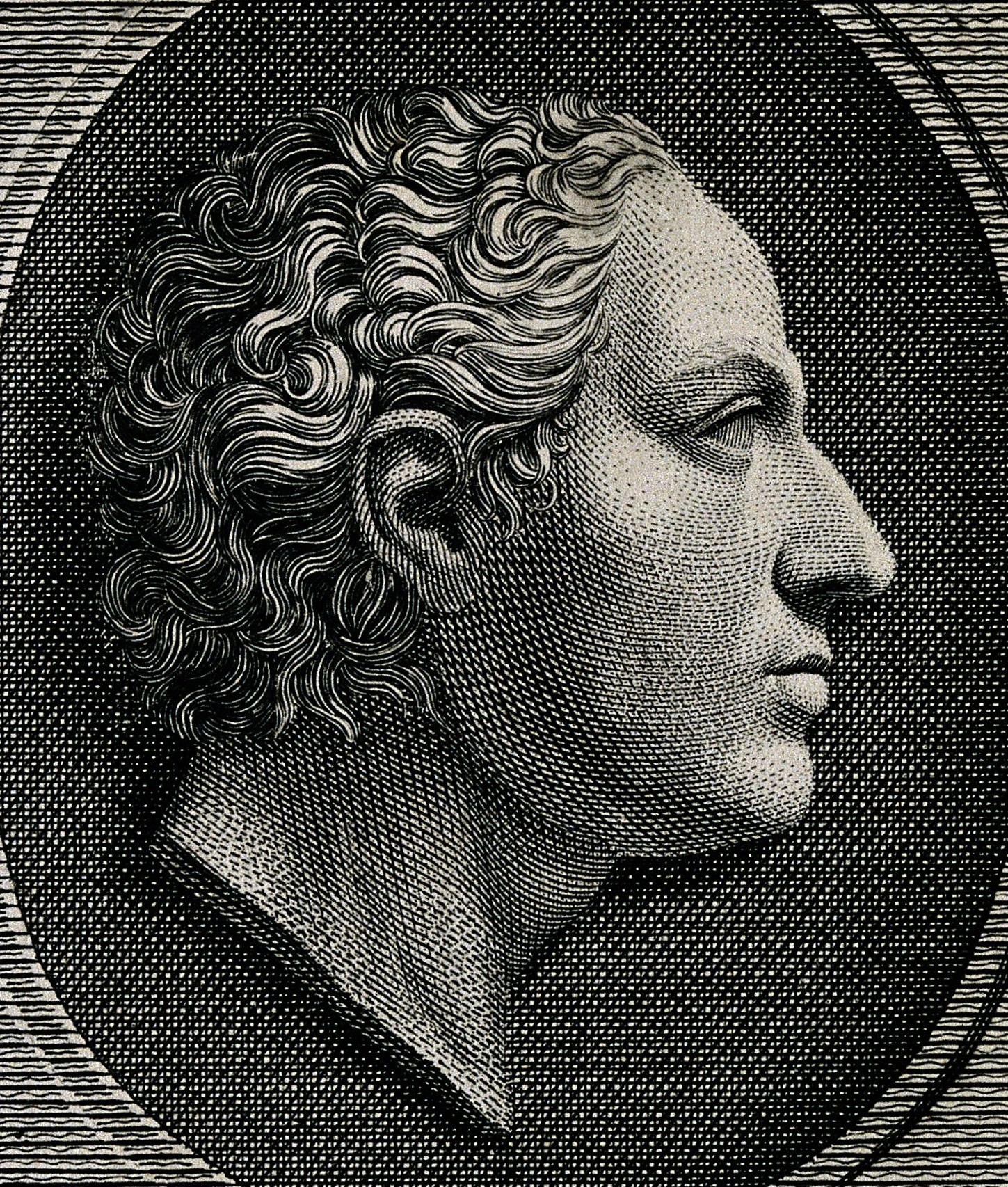
- Born: September 30, 1717; Bologna, Papal States
- Died: 1 January 1781 (aged 63); Perugia, Papal States
- Occupations: physician, antiquarian
- Parent(s): Antonio Maria Bianconi and Isabella Bianconi (née Nelli)

Academic background
- Education: University of Bologna

Academic work
- Discipline: Classical archaeology, history of art
- Influenced: Johann Joachim Winckelmann

Giovanni Ludovico Bianconi (30 September 1717 – 1 January 1781), was an Italian medical doctor and antiquarian, a multi-facetted scholar who was mentor and correspondent of the connoisseur and early art historian, Johann Joachim Winckelmann.

== Biography ==
Giovanni Ludovico Bianconi was born in Bologna in 1717. His brother Carlo Bianconi, a neoclassical painter of some reputation, served as secretary to the Brera Academy, Milan. He graduated in 1741 from the University of Bologna in philosophy and medicine and between 1743 and 1744 translated Jacob B. Winslow’s treatise on anatomy, Exposition anatomique de la structure du corps humain. From 1744 he served as doctor to Louis VIII, Landgrave of Hesse-Darmstadt, and following this, from 1750, to Frederick-Augustus II, Elector of Saxony and King of Poland.

Between 1748 and 1749 Bianconi founded, and thereafter published, the Journal des savans d’Italie, which discussed the latest ideas in scientific and literary studies in Italy. Frederick-Augustus commissioned him to purchase in Italy artworks for the Dresden Gemäldegalerie, the most famous acquisition being Raphael’s Sistine Madonna (c. 1512–14), bought in 1753. During this period Bianconi consolidated friendships with many artists and men of letters. His connections were strongest in Bologna, even among picture dealers who were his rivals in supplying Dresden, and in Florence, through Ignazio Hugford. During the Seven Years' War he followed Crown Prince (later Elector) Frederick-Christian of Saxony, first to Prague and then to Munich, where he wrote his Lettere al marchese Filippo Hercolani, a brief treatise on the artistic beauties of Munich.

== Works ==
Giovanni Lodovico Bianconi, Lettere sopra A. Cornelio Celso al celebre abate Girolamo Tiraboschi, Rome, Zempel, 1779

In the changed atmosphere and straightened finances following the Seven Years' War, Bianconi found it time to return to Italy. He accepted the honorary appointment of Saxony’s minister to the Holy See, and he spent the rest of his life in Rome. There he devoted himself exclusively to the study of antiquities and the fine arts. His most important writing on antiquities was the disquisition on the Baths of Caracalla, Descrizione dei circhi particolarmente di quello di Caracalla (1789). Also of importance are his pages of art criticism in which he expounded ideas heavily influenced by Neoclassical poetics. He also published extensively Winckelmann's reports from Herculaneum. His published works included one of the first biographies of Piranesi (1779) and the first biography of Anton Raphael Mengs (1780). His Scritti tedeschi (1763) sent from Dresden to Marchese Filippo Hercolani and to Francesco Algarotti, described the assembly and furnishing of the Electoral paintings gallery, with which Algarotti had been closely concerned. These Scritti tedeschi were edited and set in their historical context by Giovanna Perini (Argelato, 1998).

== Writings ==
- Elogio storico del cav. Giambattista Piranesi (Rome, 1779).
- Lettere sopra A. Cornelio Celso al celebre abate Girolamo Tiraboschi (Rome, 1779).
- Elogio storico di Anton Raffaele Mengs (Rome, 1780)
- Descrizione dei circhi particolarmente di quello di Caracalla (Rome, 1789)
- Otto lettere riguardanti il così detto terzo tomo della Felsina pittrice del cav. Luigi Crespi (Milan, 1802)

== Bibliography ==
- Mariotti, Annibale (1781). Delle Lodi del Signor Consigliere Gio. Lodovico Bianconi. Perugia: Riginaldi.
- Sassoli, Enrico (1885). Della vita e delle opere di Giovanni Ludovico Bianconi. Bologna: Fava e Garagnani.
- Emery, Luigi (1942). "Giovanni Ludovico Bianconi in Germania (1745-1764)". Memorie per la storia dell'Università di Bologna. XV. Bologna: 115–176.
- Leoncini, Luca (2003). "Bianconi, Giovanni Lodovico". Grove Art Online. Oxford: Oxford University Press. doi:10.1093/gao/9781884446054.article.T008658.
- Perini, Giovanna (August 1993). "Dresden and the Italian Art Market in the Eighteenth Century: Ignazio Hugford and Giovanni Ludovico Bianconi". The Burlington Magazine. 135 (1085): 550–559. JSTOR 885592.
