= Proof of Age Card =

Proof of Age Card may refer to:

- Australian state and territory issued identity photo cards
  - Queensland Adult proof of age card
  - South Australia proof of age card
  - Victoria Proof of age card

== See also ==
- Proof of Age Standards Scheme
