= Alcohol laws of Australia =

Alcohol laws of Australia are laws that regulate the sale and consumption of alcoholic beverages. The legal drinking age is 18 throughout Australia. The minimum age for the purchase of alcoholic products in Australia is 18. A licence is required to produce or sell alcohol.

In most of Australia, an alcoholic beverage is one of greater than 1.15% alcohol by volume, but in Queensland and Victoria it is one of greater than 0.5% alcohol by volume. Swan Light, a very low-alcohol beer (0.9%) is considered a soft drink in Western Australia, as would a shandy made with low-alcohol beer, whereas kombucha is considered alcoholic in Victoria. For this reason most alcoholic products sold in Australia are labelled with a statement of their alcoholic content if above 0.5%; otherwise, a product labelled "brewed" may contain some alcohol.

== Alcohol drinking age ==
State/territory	Current legal drinking	Year adopted	Previous legal age drinking
Australian Capital Territory	18	1928	Not amended
New South Wales	18	1905	16
Northern Territory	18	1929	Not amended
Queensland	18	1974	21
South Australia	18	1971	21 to 20 in 1968
Tasmania	18	1973	21 to 20 in 1968
Victoria	18	1906	16
Western Australia	18	1970	21

== Alcohol laws by state or territory ==
=== Australian Capital Territory ===
During Canberra's early years, alcohol was banned in the Australian Capital Territory, with King O'Malley in 1911 being a sponsor of the unpopular alcohol ban. Prohibition was partial, since possession of alcohol purchased outside of the Territory remained legal and the few pubs that had existing licences could continue to operate. The federal Parliament repealed the laws after residents of the Federal Capital Territory voted for the end of them in a 1928 plebiscite.

=== New South Wales ===
Alcohol may not be sold in New South Wales (NSW) without a licence or permit being obtained from the state government.

In NSW, alcohol may not be sold to a person who is under 18 years of age unless accompanied by a guardian (or spouse) and for consumption during a meal, and minors must not be on licensed premises (i.e. premises on which alcohol may be sold or consumed) unless accompanied by an adult or in other limited circumstances. The designation of restricted area (18+ only) and supervised area (minors must be accompanied by adults) must be displayed on the door or window facing outwards. Before 1905 the drinking age was 16.

There are several categories of licences available. The most common are:

- packaged liquor licence, which permit the sale of liquor to customers to take away from retail liquor stores and supermarkets. They must close at 11 pm at the latest.
- general licence, which permit the sale of liquor to customers for drinking on the premises, and to take away. These are used by pubs, hotels and taverns.
- BYO permit, which allow customers to bring their own liquor and drink it on the premises. These are obtained by restaurants and clubs that do not intend to hold a liquor licence, or do not sell and supply liquor themselves.

Other specialised licences are: full club licence, renewable limited club licence, temporary limited licence, renewable limited licence, restricted club licence, pre-retail licence (for wholesalers, producers, brewers and liquor importers), and vigneron's licence.

Some local councils have passed by-laws prohibiting the consumption of alcohol on streets within their areas, especially the Sydney CBD Entertainment Precinct, which stretches from the Sydney Harbour Bridge, Circular Quay, to the end of George Street. In other parts of Sydney, many suburbs still have similar 'alcohol-free zones', notably the immediate streets near railway stations, all main roads in Hurstville, Bankstown, Chatswood, and the City of Willoughby. Most of these bans last for four years and can be renewed each September of the four-year cycle under council discretion. Breach of the by-law can result in confiscation and disposal of open bottles of alcohol; however no fine can be issued.

In a designated area within Kings Cross, Sydney and Newcastle CBD there were formerly laws requiring a 1:30 am lockout, meaning no patrons can enter bars after that point, and no existing patrons can re-enter after that time, while last drinks are at 3 am. There were restrictions on what can be served after midnight. For example, liquor cannot be served "neat". On 28 November 2019, the NSW Government announced that the lockout laws will be lifted in Sydney's CBD and Oxford Street from 14 January 2020. The remaining major lockout conditions, including the 3:30 am last drinks rule, were removed in January 2026 by the NSW Government following a review by Liquor & Gaming NSW.

In New South Wales, if a person under 18 years of age is caught possessing or consuming liquor in a public place without being supervised by a responsible adult or having a reasonable excuse, police may seize the liquor and a maximum fine of $20 may apply. The state has an exception for a minor to consume alcohol for religious purposes, for example Holy Communion.

New South Wales alcohol laws only allow the following identification as legally accepted proof-of-age in licensed premises:

- current Australian driver licence
- A drivers licence issued in any country other than Australia that clearly has the date of birth in English
- current Victorian learner driver permit card
- current passport (Australian or foreign)
- current NSW proof-of-age card

=== Queensland ===
In Queensland, the main legislation is the Liquor Act 1992, which abolished the Licensing Commission and Court, with decision-making by Chief Executive and appeals to a Tribunal. There was a reduction of licence types to seven and permits to five. In 1997, annual licence fees charged on liquor sales were abolished. In 2012, the Queensland Liquor and Gaming Commission was abolished and replaced with a single Commissioner.

It is legal for a person under 18 years to drink alcohol within private premises, with the supervision of a parent/guardian. It is illegal for a person under the age of 18 years to purchase alcohol, or to have alcohol bought for them in public places, or to attend a licensed venue without parental supervision (there are some special circumstances). It is illegal for licensed premises to sell alcohol to someone under the age of 18 years.

Service hours were restricted from 1 July 2016. The sale or service of liquor must stop at 2am state-wide, except in "safe night precincts" where alcohol can be served until 3am. In all venues, the sale or service of rapid intoxication drinks must end at midnight.

=== South Australia ===
In South Australia, the main legislation which controls the sale and consumption of alcohol is the Liquor Licensing Act 1997 (SA). The principal aim of the Act is to minimise the harm associated with the consumption of alcohol in South Australia. Premier Don Dunstan introduced the Age of Majority (Reduction) Bill in October 1970 and lowered the drinking age from 21 to 20 in 1968. By 1971, South Australia had a drinking age of 18. Between 1836 and 1839, liquor licences were granted by the Governor.

On 21 February 1839, Act No. 1 of 1839 became the first liquor licensing legislation in the Province, including three licences:

- General Publican's Licence
- Wine, Ale, Beer and other Malt Liquors Licence
- Storekeeper's Licence

In 1869, a Storekeeper's Colonial Wine Licence was introduced.

=== Victoria ===
Alcohol may not be sold in Victoria without a licence or permit being obtained from the Victorian Commission for Gambling and Liquor Regulation, under the Liquor Control Reform Act 1998.

There are several categories of licences available, the most common ones being:

- packaged liquor licence, which permit the sale of liquor to customers to take away from retail liquor stores and supermarkets.
- general licence, which permit the sale of liquor to customers for drinking on the premises, and to take away. These are used by pubs, hotels and taverns.
- BYO permit, which allow customers to bring their own liquor and drink it on the premises. These are obtained by restaurants and clubs that do not intend to hold a liquor licence.

Other specialised licences are: full club licence, renewable limited club licence, temporary limited licence, renewable limited licence, restricted club licence, pre-retail licence (for wholesalers, producers, brewers and liquor importers), and vigneron's licence.

Some local government by-laws prohibit the consumption of alcohol on designated streets, parks, and other areas within their jurisdictions.

Consumption of alcohol on public transport property and vehicles is not allowed.

Persons under 18 years cannot drink alcohol on licensed premises under any circumstances. Until 13 September 2018, licensees could supply liquor to a minor for consumption on a licensed premises as part of a meal if the minor was accompanied by a parent, guardian, or spouse, and minors could not be on licensed premises (i.e. premises on which alcohol may be sold or consumed) unless accompanied by an adult or in other limited circumstances.

If a minor is caught with alcohol in public it can be confiscated and guardians notified of the offence, and a fine may be imposed. Previously, minors were allowed to drink alcohol if it was given to them by anyone on private property, for example at a party. Since late 2011 parental permission is required to be given to any adult before a minor is served alcohol, under a penalty of $7,000.

Victorian alcohol laws only allow the following identification as legally accepted proof-of-age in licensed premises:

- current Australian driver licence
- current Victorian learner driver permit card
- current passport (Australian or foreign)
- current Keypass identity card
- current proof-of-age card from any Australian state or territory.

In Victoria, fully licensed drivers of motor vehicles must have a blood alcohol content (BAC) below 0.05%. Learner and probationary licensed drivers must not consume any alcohol before driving (i.e. the BAC must be zero).

Until May 2015, a single area in Melbourne, covering parts or all of Balwyn, Camberwell, Canterbury, Glen Iris, Box Hill, Mont Albert, and Surrey Hills, was designated a "dry area." In this area, local residents were required to vote before any liquor licence could be granted. This requirement was later relaxed, with voting now only required for licences involving hotels, pubs, and clubs. To date, none of these types of venues exist in the area. Before the 2018 state election, the Andrews government announced that it would abolish the dry area if re-elected, and it was returned to office.

=== Western Australia ===
In the state of Western Australia, the sale, supply, and consumption of alcohol is regulated by the Liquor Control Act 1988 and Liquor Control Regulations 1989, administered by the Department of Local Government, Sport and Cultural Industries.

British businessman Alistair McAlpine (1942–2014), active in Perth in the 1960s, wrote of the drinking rules in the city at the time: "On a Sunday, there was no drinking except for a couple of hours in the afternoon. This was called 'the Session'. The beer was served in jugs, each member of the party taking a couple of jugs in each hand, going into the garden of the (Adelphi) hotel and drinking long after the place closed."

Before 1970, the drinking age in Western Australia was 21. Today, it is illegal for any person under the age of 18 years to purchase, supply, or drink alcohol on licensed or regulated premises, even if they are with their parents or guardian.

The maximum penalty for a minor to consume alcohol on licensed premises is a $2,000 fine. The law does allow a minor to consume alcohol for religious purposes for example Holy Communion. It is an offence in Western Australia for persons of any age to drink in public, such as on the street, park, beach, or as a passenger in a hired vehicle without first having obtained a permit from the appropriate local government authority. Such permits are at the discretion of the local council—some public events have a total ban on alcohol consumption and no permits will be issued.

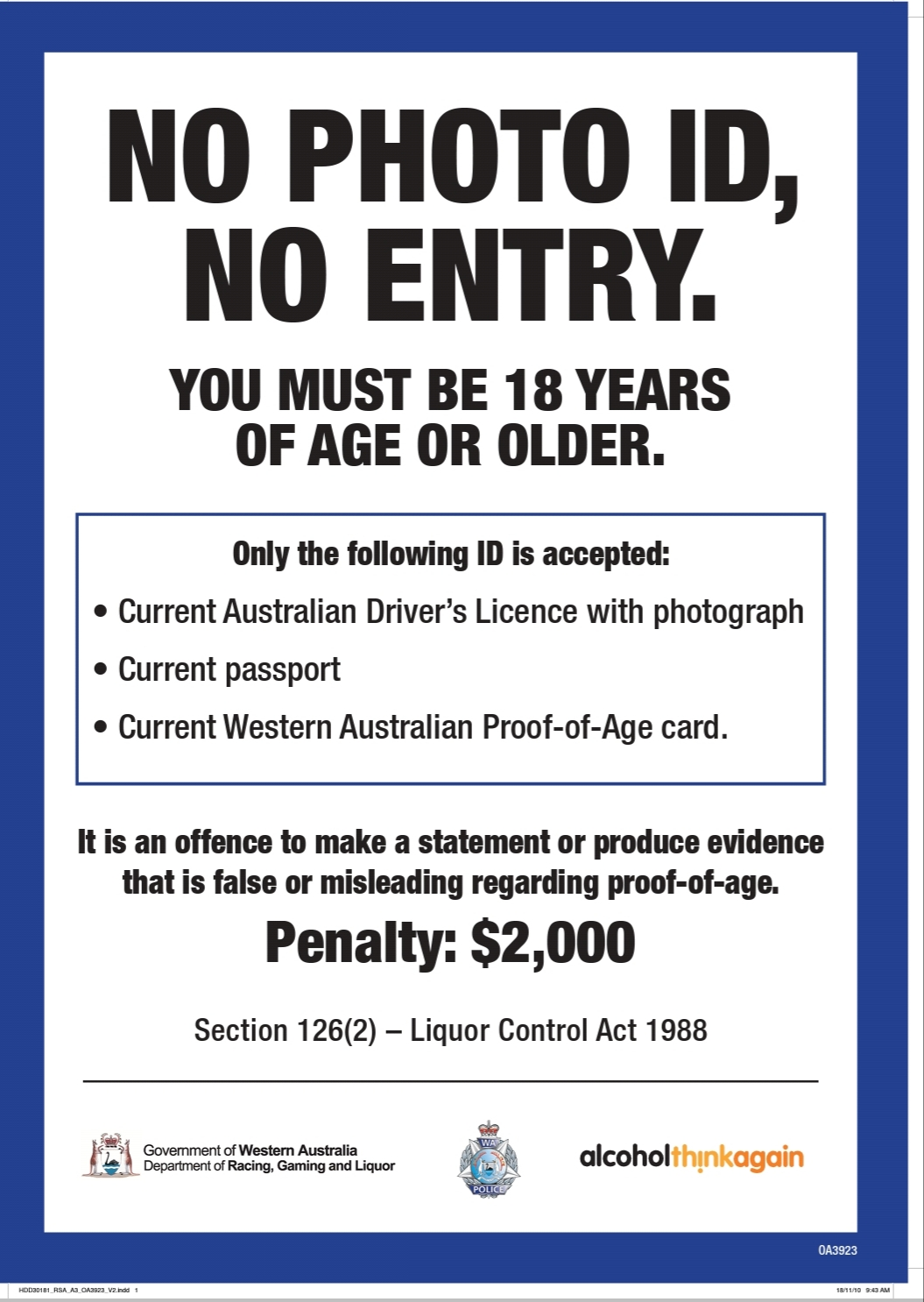
A sign informing people about acceptable photo ID in Western Australia

Western Australian alcohol laws only allow the following identification as legally accepted proof of age in licensed premises:

- current Australian driver licence
- current passport (Australian or foreign)
- current Australian learner driver permit
- current WA or NSW photo card
- other equivalent proof-of-age or photo card issued by another Australian state or territory government.

The former WA proof of age card and the hard-copy Keypass identity card are also still accepted if the card is current, though these forms of identification are no longer issued.

==== Under-age drinking at home ====
In general, minors are allowed to drink at home if the alcohol is provided by a parent or guardian, or with a parent or guardian's permission, and none of the people involved are drunk.

=== Northern Territory ===
In the Northern Territory you must be 18 years old to:

- buy alcohol
- enter a gaming premises, such as a pokie room or casino
- serve alcohol in a bar, restaurant or liquor outlet.

While there is no state-level prohibition, there are many places in the Northern Territory where drinking alcohol is banned.

Additionally, NT introduced a minimum price of A$1.30 per unit (equivalent to 10 grams of pure alcohol or one “standard drink”) on alcohol, in a bid to tackle problem drinking on October 1, 2018. the legislation has been found to be effective, achieving a 50.57% reduction in cask wine consumption across the NT in the following year. However, this has been argued to be attributed to the COVID-19 pandemic. The minimum price law has since been repealed by the Finocchiaro ministry, with effect from 1 March 2025.

== See also ==
- Alcohol in Australia
- Liquor Act 2019 (Northern Territory)
