= Public Health (Minimum Price for Alcohol) (Wales) Act 2018 =

- Act of the National Assembly for Wales
- National Assembly for Wales
- Long title: An Act of the National Assembly for Wales to make provision about the minimum price for which alcohol is to be supplied in Wales by certain persons; and for connected purposes.
- Citation: 2018 anaw 5
- Introduced by: Rebecca Evans AM
- Territorial extent: Wales

Dates
- Royal assent: 9 August 2018
- Commencement: 1 May 2018

Status: Current legislation

Text of statute as originally enacted

Text of the Public Health (Minimum Price for Alcohol) (Wales) Act 2018 as in force today (including any amendments) within the United Kingdom, from legislation.gov.uk.

The Public Health (Minimum Price for Alcohol) (Wales) Act 2018 (anaw 5) (Welsh: Deddf Iechyd y Cyhoedd (Isafbris am Alcohol) (Cymru) 2018) is an Act of the National Assembly for Wales, which introduces a statutory minimum price for alcohol, initially 50p per unit, as an element in the programme to counter alcohol problems.

== Effects ==
Research by Newcastle University published in May 2021 found that alcohol sales dropped by 8.6% in Wales following the introduction of a minimum price, when compared to north-east England.

A study published in 2021 found reductions in overall purchases of alcohol, largely restricted to households that bought the most alcohol, which continued into 2020. A 2023 study carried out by Public Health Wales and the University of South Wales concluded that COVID-19 had a much larger impact on the behaviour of problematic drinkers, confounding any predictions on long-term behaviour.

== See also ==
- Alcoholism in Ireland
- Long-term effects of alcohol consumption
- Alcohol (Minimum Pricing) (Scotland) Act 2012
- Liquor Act 2019 (Northern Territory of Australia)
