= Alcohol (Minimum Pricing) (Scotland) Act 2012 =

- Act of the Scottish Parliament
- Scottish Parliament
- Long title: An Act of the Scottish Parliament to make provision about the price at which alcohol may be sold from licensed premises; and for connected purposes.
- Citation: 2012 asp 4
- Introduced by: Nicola Sturgeon MSP
- Territorial extent: Scotland

Dates
- Royal assent: 29 June 2012
- Commencement: 1 May 2018

Status: Current legislation

Text of statute as originally enacted

Text of the Alcohol (Minimum Pricing) (Scotland) Act 2012 as in force today (including any amendments) within the United Kingdom, from legislation.gov.uk.

The Alcohol (Minimum Pricing) (Scotland) Act 2012 (asp 4) is an act of the Scottish Parliament, which introduces a statutory minimum price for alcohol, initially 50p per unit, as an element in the programme to counter alcohol problems.

The act was passed with the support of the Scottish National Party, the Conservatives, the Liberal Democrats and the Greens. The opposition, Labour, refused to support the legislation because the Act failed to claw back an estimated £125m windfall profit from alcohol retailers. The Labour MSP Malcolm Chisholm, the former Minister for Health and Community Care, disobeyed his party's whip and supported the government.

== Legal challenge ==
A legal challenge to the minimum pricing legislation failed at the Court of Session. The Scotch Whisky Association, the Confédération Européenne des Producteurs de Spiritueux and the Comité Européen des Entreprises Vins appealed the judgement. The act was delayed, with a legal challenge by the Scotch Whisky Association being referred to the Court of Justice of the European Union by the Court of Session.

The decision of the court, delivered in December 2015, was that such legislation would only be lawful if alternative policies such as higher taxes would not be effective in protecting public health. Scottish judges would be required to consider evidence on this point.

On 15 November 2017, the Supreme Court of the United Kingdom unanimously rejected the Scotch Whisky Association's case, ending the legal battle, arguing that minimum pricing was a "proportionate means of achieving a legitimate aim".

The act came into effect on 1 May 2018.

As of September 2024, the minimum price has increased to 65 pence per unit, reflecting efforts to address inflation and continue reducing alcohol-related deaths and hospital admissions.

== Effects ==
Research by Newcastle University published in May 2021 found that alcohol sales dropped by 7.7% in Scotland following the introduction of a minimum price, when compared to north-east England.

A study published in 2021 found reductions in overall purchases of alcohol, largely restricted to households that bought the most alcohol, which continued into 2020. A study carried out by Public Health Scotland, and the University of Glasgow, found that the implementation of alcohol minimum unit pricing in Scotland led to a 13.4% reduction in deaths from alcohol-specific causes.

== See also ==
- Alcoholism in Ireland
- Long-term effects of alcohol consumption
- Liquor Act 2019 (Northern Territory of Australia)
- Public Health (Minimum Price for Alcohol) (Wales) Act 2018
