= NSW Photo Card =

Australian identification card

- Both sides of the photo card, license number highlighted
- Type: photo card
- Issued by: Service NSW
- Purpose: Identification
- Eligibility: Residents of NSW aged 16 or over
- Expiration: 5 years or 10 years if over 21
- Cost: $6 if obtained with a drivers licence or $18 for person holding NSW driving license or $68 for person without driving license for a 5 year term, alternatively if you are 21 years or older you can purchase a 10 year photo ID card for $122 or free for concession card holders. Free to NSW seniors, concession card holders and Centrelink carers.
- Website: https://www.nsw.gov.au/driving-boating-and-transport/driver-and-rider-licences/proof-of-identity/photo-cards

The NSW Photo Card is a voluntary photo card issued by the Service NSW in New South Wales, Australia. It is credit-card sized and bears the cardholder’s photo, signature, name, address and date of birth.

The NSW Photo Card replaced the 'proof of age' card on 14 December 2005. The proof of age card was age-restricted to adults between 18 and 25 years old, initially, the NSW Photo Card was issued to anyone over 16 years of age not in possession of a state driver licence. As of 1 March 2017, the NSW Photo Card is available to all residents of NSW aged 16 and over, whether or not they have a state driver's licence. At the time of driver licence renewal, a discounted fee can be paid to obtain the additional card.

There are three numbers on the photo card. First, the photo card number (PC Number) on the front centre-left; this number does not change even after re-issue. Secondly, there is a card number on the front top, and finally a number on the rear at top left.

The rear of the card has a space for an address label and displays the date of birth with the last two digits of the year in large numbers, e.g. "99" for 1999, to help with quick age identification at restricted premises.
