= WA Photo card =

Australian identification card

Western Australia Photo Card
- The front and back of a Western Australia Photo card
- Type: photo card
- Issued by: Western Australia
- Purpose: Identification
- Eligibility: Residents of Western Australia Aged 16 or over
- Expiration: 5 years
- Cost: $47.50
- Website: https://www.wa.gov.au/service/security/law-enforcement/apply-photo-card

The Western Australia Photo Card is a voluntary photo identification card available to people over 16 and are residents of Western Australia. Up to two cards can be issued - one with and one without an address. It is used to prove identity primarily for those without a drivers licence.

On the front of the photo card, a kangaroo can be seen under UV light.

In order to apply for a Western Australia Photo Card, the applier must visit a DTMI service centre or regional agent in person, and the applier will need to bring a completed Photo Card Application form, and 5 points of indentity if it's their first time applying. If they hold a Driver's licence or a Learner's permit, then the applier must bring 1 primary and 1 secondary proof of identity.
