= Tasmanian Government Personal Information Card =

Identification card

- Personal information card
- Type: photo card
- Issued by: Tasmania
- Purpose: Identification
- Eligibility: Residents of Tasmania 14 years and above
- Expiration: 5 years
- Cost: $29
- Website: https://www.service.tas.gov.au/services/me-and-my-identity/personal-information-card/apply-for-renew-or-replace-a-personal-information-card/

The Tasmanian Government Personal Information Card is a voluntary identity photo card issued to residents of Tasmania, Australia available to people of all ages.
