= Victorian Commission for Gambling and Liquor Regulation =

Former body regulating the liquor and gambling industry in Victoria, Australia

The Victorian Commission for Gambling and Liquor Regulation (VCGLR) was the independent statutory authority that regulated the liquor and gambling industries in Victoria, Australia. This regulation included liquor and gaming licensing, compliance and education.

On 1 July 2022, the VCGLR was replaced by the Victorian Gambling and Casino Control Commission as the independent regulator of Victoria's gaming industry and the Victorian Liquor Commission, Victoria's liquor regulator. This followed the Finkelstein Royal Commission into Crown Melbourne, which criticised the VCGLR for ignoring concerns raised about the casino's wide-ranging ethical failures.

== Background ==
The VCGLR commenced operations on 6 February 2012, replacing the Responsible Alcohol Victoria, and Victorian Commission for Gambling Regulation. The VCGLR had the power to undertake liquor disciplinary actions, which replaced the role of the Victorian Civil and Administrative Tribunal.

The statutory obligations were set out in several Acts of Parliament. These included regulating:

- the liquor industry in accordance with the Liquor Control Reform Act 1998
- all forms of legalised gambling in accordance with the Gambling Regulation Act 2003, the Casino Control Act 1991 and the Casino (Management Agreement) Act 1993.

== Commissioners ==
The Commissioners of the VCGLR were accountable for statutory decision-making and governance. They were required to make decisions, either individually or collectively with other Commissioners relating to the grant, variation and transfer of licences and permits, conditions attached to licences and permits, disciplinary actions against licensees and permittees and reviews of decisions made under delegation by individual Commissions or members of staff.

== See also ==
- Alcohol laws of Australia
