= Queensland photo identification card =

Identification card

- Front and back of a Queensland photo identification card, card number highlighted
- Type: Photo card
- Issued by: Queensland
- Purpose: Identification
- Eligibility: Residents of Queensland aged 15 or over
- Expiration: 10 years
- Cost: $77.40
- Website: https://www.qld.gov.au/transport/licensing/proof-of-age

Queensland adult proof of age card
- Front and back of a Queensland adult proof of age card, card number highlighted
- Type: Photo card
- Issued by: Queensland
- Purpose: Identification
- Eligibility: Residents of Queensland aged 18 or over
- Expiration: 10 years
- Cost: $77.40
- Website: https://www.qld.gov.au/transport/licensing/proof-of-age

The Queensland photo identification card serves as an identity photo card for residents of the state of Queensland, Australia, who are aged over 15 years. While it is now available to drivers and non-drivers, it was originally conceived for people who did not have a driver's licence. It displays the holder's name, address (optional), date of birth, and signature.

Prior to April 2019, the Queensland adult proof of age card was issued for residents of Queensland aged over 18 years.
