= NT Evidence of age card =

Identification card

Northern Territory Evidence of age card
- Both sides of a Northern Territory Evidence of age card
- Type: photo card
- Issued by: Northern Territory
- Purpose: Identification
- Eligibility: Residents of Northern Territory Aged 18 or over
- Expiration: 5 years
- Cost: $28
- Website: https://nt.gov.au/driving/mvr/evidence-of-age-card

The Northern Territory (NT) Evidence of age card is a voluntary identity photo card available to residents of NT, Australia over the age of 18. The purpose of the card is to access age restricted services especially for those without a drivers licence.
