= ACT Proof of Identity Card =

Identification card

ACT Proof of Identity card
- The front and back of an ACT Proof of Identity card
- Type: photo card
- Issued by: Australian Capital Territory
- Purpose: Identification
- Eligibility: Residents of the ACT aged 18 or over
- Expiration: No expiry
- Cost: $7
- Website: https://www.accesscanberra.act.gov.au/identity/proof-of-identity-and-residency/proof-of-identity-cards

The Australian Capital Territory Proof of Identity Card is a voluntary identity photo card available to all residents of the Australian Capital Territory (ACT), Australia The purpose is mainly to access restricted services for people over the age of 18 or to prove identity for those without a driver's licence.
