= List of acts of the Scottish Parliament from 2012 =

This is a list of acts of the Scottish Parliament passed in 2012. Acts of the Scottish Parliament are enacted by the Scottish Parliament, which has legislative authority over devolved matters in relation to Scotland under the authority of the Scotland Act 1998. Acts are cited by calendar year, in the same fashion as acts of Parliament of the United Kingdom. Each act passed in a respective year is numbered consecutively with Arabic numerals, following the prefix "asp".

11 acts of the Scottish Parliament were passed in 2012.

indicates that an act has been transcribed on Wikisource, indicates that an act is available to view at legislation.gov.uk, and indicates the location of the original act in the Parliamentary Archives.

== Acts of the Scottish Parliament ==
Short title	Citation	Royal assent
Long title
Offensive Behaviour at Football and Threatening Communications (Scotland) Act 2012	2012 asp 1	19 January 2012
An Act of the Scottish Parliament to create offences concerning offensive behaviour in relation to certain football matches, and concerning the communication of certain threatening material.
Budget (Scotland) Act 2012	2012 asp 2	14 March 2012
An Act of the Scottish Parliament to make provision, for financial year 2012/13, for the use of resources by the Scottish Administration and certain bodies whose expenditure is payable out of the Scottish Consolidated Fund, for the maximum amounts of borrowing by certain statutory bodies and for authorising the payment of sums out of the Fund; to make provision, for financial year 2013/14, for authorising the payment of sums out of the Fund on a temporary basis; and for connected purposes.
National Library of Scotland Act 2012	2012 asp 3	21 June 2012
An Act of the Scottish Parliament to make further provision about the name, functions and governance of the National Library of Scotland; and for connected purposes.
Alcohol (Minimum Pricing) (Scotland) Act 2012	2012 asp 4	29 June 2012
An Act of the Scottish Parliament to make provision about the price at which alcohol may be sold from licensed premises; and for connected purposes.
Land Registration etc. (Scotland) Act 2012	2012 asp 5	10 July 2012
An Act of the Scottish Parliament to reform and restate the law on the registration of rights to land in the land register; to enable electronic conveyancing and registration of electronic documents in the land register; to provide for the closure of the Register of Sasines in due course; to make provision about the functions of the Keeper of the Registers of Scotland; to allow electronic documents to be used for certain contracts, unilateral obligations and trusts that must be constituted by writing; to provide about the formal validity of electronic documents and for their registration; and for connected purposes.
Agricultural Holdings (Amendment) (Scotland) Act 2012	2012 asp 6	12 July 2012
An Act of the Scottish Parliament to amend the law governing succession to agricultural tenancies and the review or variation of rent under such tenancies.
Criminal Cases (Punishment and Review) (Scotland) Act 2012	2012 asp 7	26 July 2012
An Act of the Scottish Parliament to amend the rules about the punishment part of non-mandatory life sentences imposed in criminal cases and to amend the rules about the disclosure of information obtained by the Scottish Criminal Cases Review Commission.
Police and Fire Reform (Scotland) Act 2012	2012 asp 8	7 August 2012
An Act of the Scottish Parliament to make provision about policing; to make provision about fire and rescue services; and for connected purposes.
Long Leases (Scotland) Act 2012	2012 asp 9	7 August 2012
An Act of the Scottish Parliament to convert certain long leases into ownership; to provide for the conversion into real burdens of certain rights and obligations under such leases; to provide for payment to former owners of land of compensation for loss of it on conversion; and for connected purposes.
Welfare Reform (Further Provision) (Scotland) Act 2012	2012 asp 10	7 August 2012
An Act of the Scottish Parliament to enable the Scottish Ministers to make provision by regulations in consequence of the Welfare Reform Act 2012 (Note: Welfare Reform Act 2012 (c. 5)) (in respect of matters other than reserved matters).
Local Government Finance (Unoccupied Properties etc.) (Scotland) Act 2012	2012 asp 11	5 December 2012
An Act of the Scottish Parliament to amend the law regarding non-domestic rates and council tax in respect of unoccupied properties; and to repeal certain provisions that allow grants to be made to local authorities to meet housing needs in their areas.

== See also ==
- List of acts of the Scottish Parliament
