= Climate of Ireland =

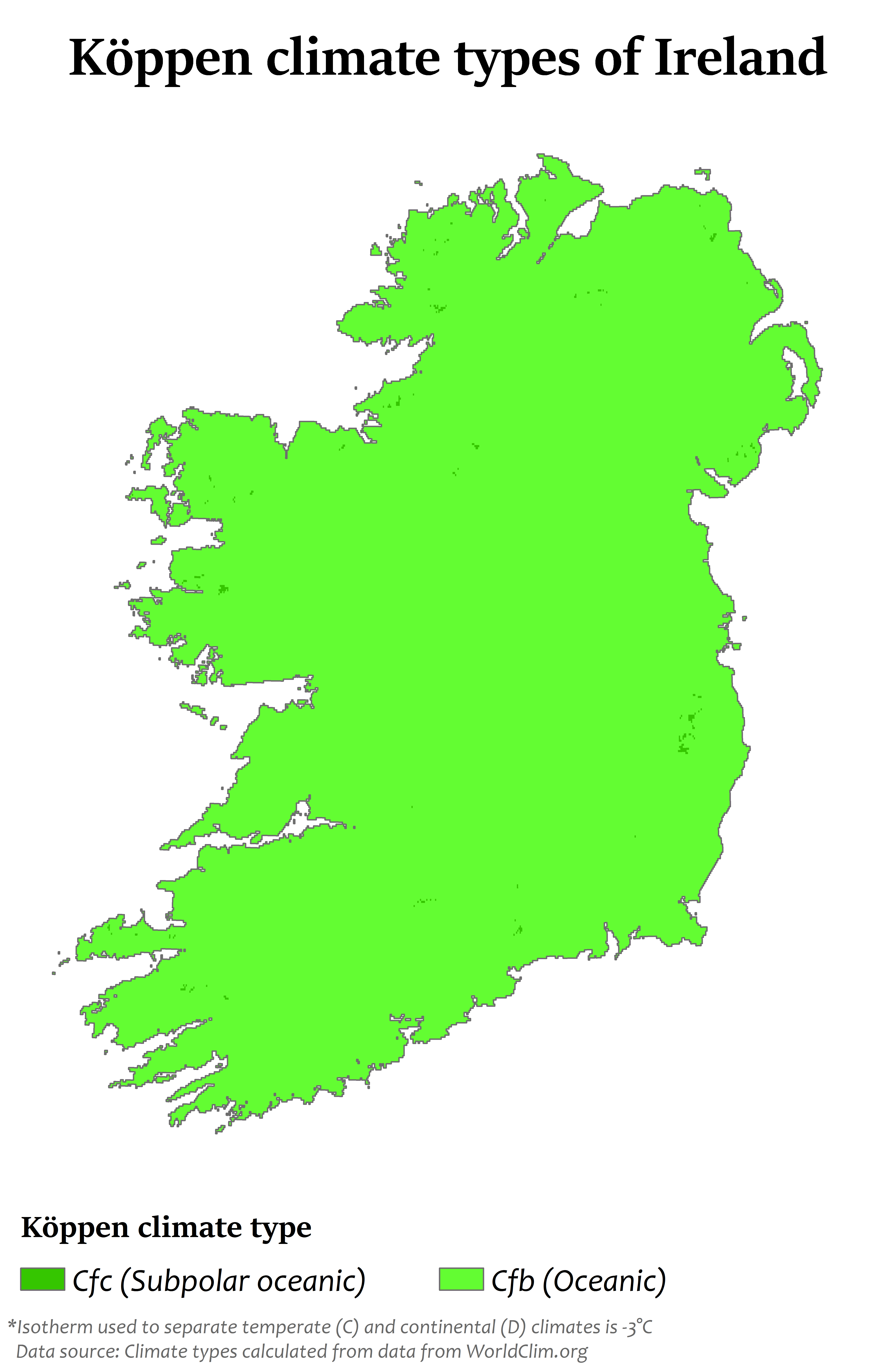
Köppen climate types in Ireland.

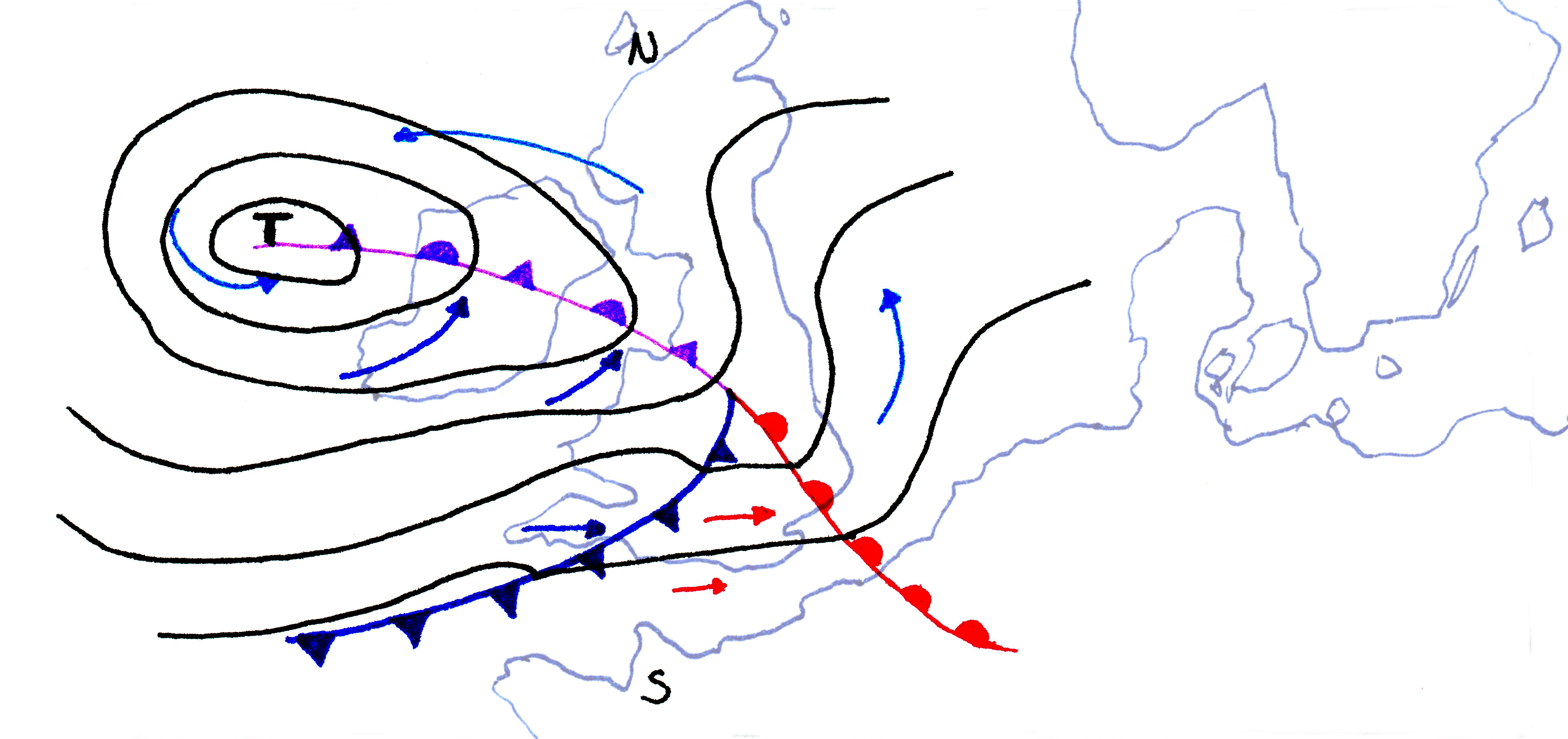
A typical North Atlantic low-pressure area moving across Ireland.

The climate of Ireland is mild, humid, and changeable, with abundant rainfall and a lack of temperature extremes. Ireland's climate is defined as a temperate oceanic climate, or Cfb on the Köppen climate classification system, a classification it shares with most of northwest Europe. The island receives generally warm summers and cool winters.

As Ireland is downwind of a large ocean, it is considerably milder in winter than other locations at the same latitude, such as Newfoundland in Canada or Sakhalin in Russia. The Atlantic overturning circulation, which includes ocean currents such as the North Atlantic Current and the Gulf Stream, releases additional heat over the Atlantic, which is then carried by the prevailing winds towards Ireland, giving, for example, Dublin a milder winter climate than other temperate oceanic climates in similar locations.

The prevailing wind blows from the southwest, breaking on the high mountains of the west coast. Rainfall is therefore a particularly prominent part of western Irish life, with Valentia Island, off the west coast of County Kerry, receiving almost twice as much annual rainfall as Dublin on the east (1,400 mm or 55.1 in vs. 714 mm or 28.1 in).

January and February are the coldest months of the year, and mean daily air temperatures fall between 4 and 7 °C (39.2 and 44.6 °F) during these months. July and August are the warmest, with mean daily temperatures of 14 to 16 °C (57.2 to 60.8 °F), whilst mean daily maximums in July and August vary from 17 to 18 °C (62.6 to 64.4 °F) near the coast, to 19 to 20 °C (66.2 to 68.0 °F) inland. The sunniest months are May and June, with an average of five to seven hours sunshine per day. Though extreme weather events in Ireland are comparatively rare when compared with other countries in the European continent, they do occur. Atlantic depressions, occurring mainly in the months of December, January and February, can occasionally bring winds of up to 160 km/h or 99 mph to Western coastal counties, with the winter of 2013/14 being the stormiest on record. During the summer months, and particularly around late July/early August, thunderstorms can develop.

== Temperature ==
Ireland experiences a lack of temperature extremes compared to other areas at similar latitudes. There is regional variation, with inland areas being cooler in winter and warmer in summer than their coastal counterparts.

The warmest areas are found along the southwest coast. Valentia Island has the highest average temperature, at 10.9 °C.

The coldest areas are found inland. Mullingar has the lowest average temperature, at 9.3 °C.

The highest temperature ever recorded in Ireland was 33.3 °C at Kilkenny Castle, on 26 June 1887; the accuracy of this measurement is disputed. The lowest temperature was –19.1 °C at Markree Castle on 16 January 1881.

Six of the warmest ten years in Ireland have occurred since 1990. Due to climate change, it is estimated that the temperatures will rise everywhere by up to 3.4 degrees by the end of the century.

Extreme heat and cold are both rare throughout the country. Summer temperatures exceeding 30 °C are rare, however becoming increasingly common, occurring in the following years: (2026, 2025, 2022, 2021, 2018, 2016, 2013, 2006, 2003, 1995, 1990, 1989, 1983, 1976 and 1975 are recent examples), although they commonly reach the high 20s most summers. Severe freezes occur only occasionally in winter, with temperatures below –10 °C being very uncommon in the lowlands and temperatures below freezing uncommon in many coastal areas. However, temperatures in the Wicklow Mountains are said to reach –10 °C annually.

Climate data for Republic of Ireland
Month	Jan	Feb	Mar	Apr	May	Jun	Jul	Aug	Sep	Oct	Nov	Dec	Year
Record high °C (°F)	18.5 (65.3)	18.1 (64.6)	23.6 (74.5)	25.9 (78.6)	30.9 (87.6)	33.3 (91.9)	33.0 (91.4)	32.1 (89.8)	29.1 (84.4)	25.2 (77.4)	20.1 (68.2)	18.1 (64.6)	33.3 (91.9)
Record low °C (°F)	−19.1 (−2.4)	−17.8 (0.0)	−17.2 (1.0)	−7.7 (18.1)	−5.6 (21.9)	−3.3 (26.1)	−0.3 (31.5)	−2.7 (27.1)	−3 (27)	−8.3 (17.1)	−11.5 (11.3)	−17.5 (0.5)	−19.1 (−2.4)
Source 1: Met Éireann
Source 2: Met Éireann (August record high) Met Éireann (April provisional record high)

=== Frost ===
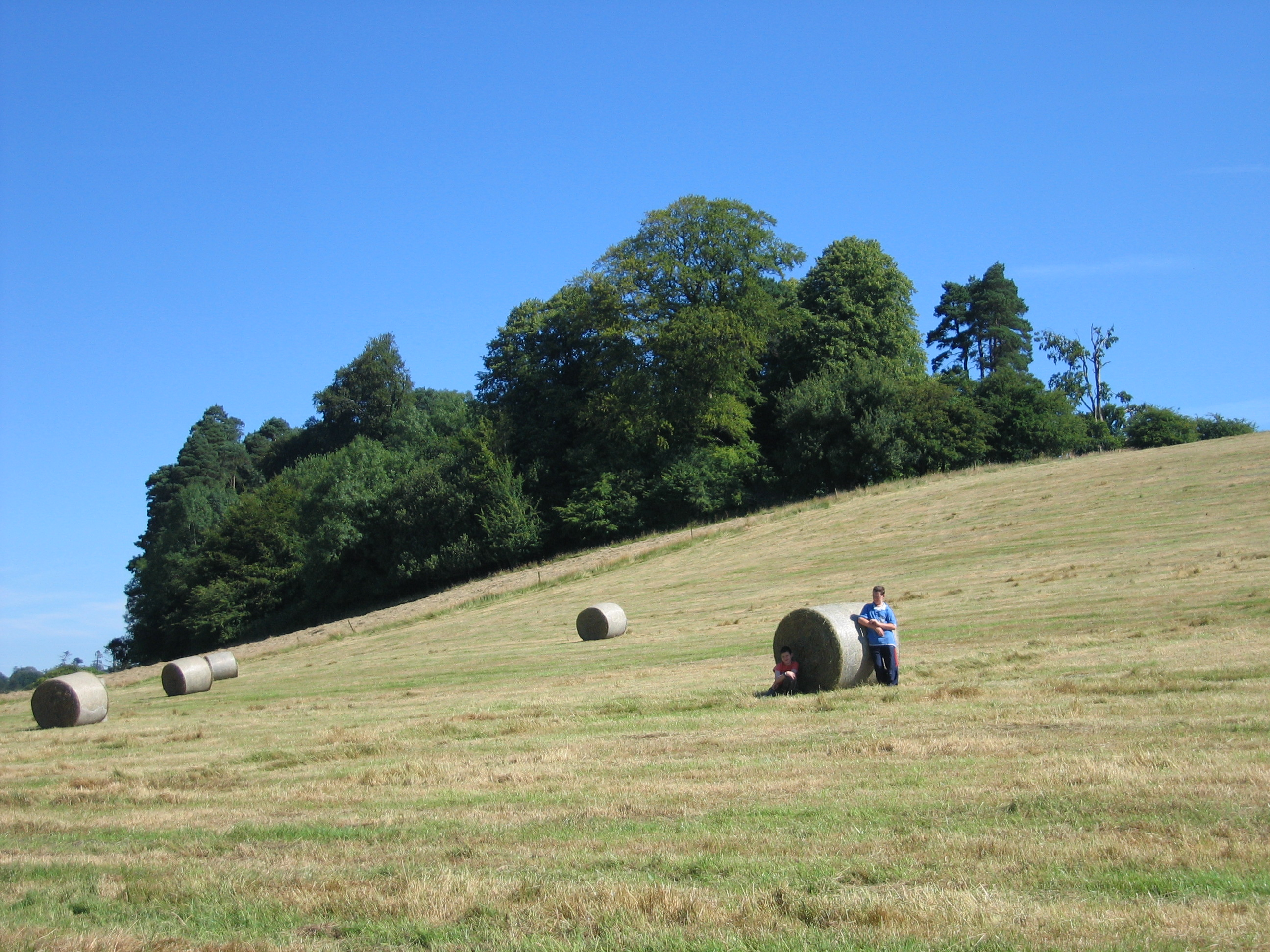
July sunshine in County Cavan

Air frost occurs frequently in the winter, with most areas seeing over 40 days of air frost every year. In northern areas, air frost occurs on average 10.2 days every January, the month in which air frost occurs most frequently. In the Sperrins and the Glens of Antrim air frost occurs around 80 days a year. The pattern is similar with ground frost, with on average around 100 days of ground frost in the lowlands and over 140 in the mountains. The number of frost days in Ireland have declined massively over the past decade. The largest season decrease has been known to take place in winter.

Frost is rarer along the coast, in urban areas and also in western and southern areas.

Roches Point, County Cork receives the fewest days with air frost, with an average of 7.0 days with air frost recorded annually.

Kilkenny, County Kilkenny receives the most days with air frost, with an average of 53.0 days with air frost recorded annually.

In Dublin, Dublin Airport records air frost on average 24.3 days per year, while Casement Aerodrome (which is further inland) records air frost on average 41.3 days per year.

== Sunshine ==
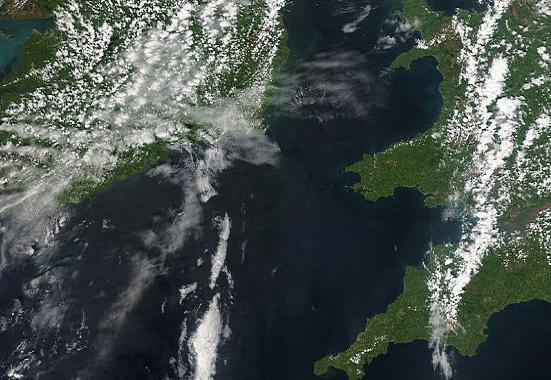
Satellite image showing inland summer cloud development over Ireland and Britain

The sunniest months are May and June. During these months sunshine duration averages between 5 and 6½ hours per day over most of the country. The southeast gets the most sunshine, averaging over 7 hours a day in early summer. December is the most overcast month, with average daily sunshine ranging from about 1 hour in the north to almost 2 hours in the southeast. Over the year as a whole, most areas get an average of between 3¼ and 3¾ hours of sunshine each day. Irish skies are completely covered by cloud roughly half of the time.

The sunniest part of the island is the southeast coast. Rosslare, County Wexford was historically the sunniest area, however, the station was closed by Met Éireann in 2007. The sunniest station throughout the 1981 to 2010 period was Ballyrichard HSE in Arklow, County Wicklow, which received an average of 4.41 hours of sunshine per day.

Climate data for Arklow, County Wicklow, elevation 20m, (1981-2010)
Month	Jan	Feb	Mar	Apr	May	Jun	Jul	Aug	Sep	Oct	Nov	Dec	Year
Mean monthly sunshine hours	62.0	85.0	118.1	154.4	220.8	206.2	205.0	184.5	145.1	101.8	64.6	64.5	1,612
Source: Met Éireann

The cloudiest (i.e. least sunny) parts of the island are generally the west and northwest of the country. Over the 1971-2000 averaging period, Claremorris, County Mayo was the cloudiest station, receiving just 1,072 hours of sunshine per year. From 1981 to 2010, Birr, County Offaly, in the Midlands, was the most cloudy (overcast) station, receiving on average 3.2 hours of sunshine per day, considerably less than the stations at Malin Head in the north or Belmullet in the west. Inland areas tend to receive less sunshine than coastal areas due to the convective development of clouds over land. Cloud develops because of vertical air currents caused by thermal heating of the ground.

Climate data for Birr, County Offaly, elevation 73m, (1979-2008)
Month	Jan	Feb	Mar	Apr	May	Jun	Jul	Aug	Sep	Oct	Nov	Dec	Year
Mean monthly sunshine hours	47.3	63.5	89.2	136.5	159.7	134.7	124.3	125.3	107.7	88.8	57.6	42.7	1,177.3
Source 1: Met Éireann
Source 2: European Climate Assessment & Dataset,

== Precipitation ==
=== Precipitation ===
Rainfall is the most common form of precipitation on the island, and is extremely common throughout Ireland, although some parts of the west coast receive twice as much rain as the east coast. Rainfall in Ireland normally comes from Atlantic frontal systems which travel northeast over the island, bringing cloud and rain. Most of the eastern half of the country has between 750 and 1,000 mm (29.5 and 39.4 in) of rainfall in the year. Rainfall in the west generally averages between 1,000 and 1,250 mm (39.4 and 49.2 in). In many mountainous districts rainfall exceeds 3,000 mm (118.1 in) per year. The wettest months almost everywhere are December and January. April is the driest month generally, but in many southern parts, June is the driest.

The average number of "wet days" (days with more than 1 mm (0.039 in) of rain) ranges from about 151 days a year along the east and southeast coasts, to about 225 days a year in parts of the west.

The wettest weather station is Glanagimla, Leenane, Co. Galway, which averages 2,874.59 mm (113.17 in) rain per year. The wettest synoptic weather station is Valentia Island, which receives 1,430.1 mm (56.30 in) of rain per year, on average.

The driest weather station is at Ringsend, Co. Dublin, which receives 683 mm (26.89 in) of rain per year, on average.

The weather station with the highest number of "wet days" is Belmullet, with 193 days per year, while the station with the lowest number of "wet days" is Dublin Airport, with 128 days per year.

==== Rainfall records ====
- The driest year recorded in Ireland was 1887, with 356.6 mm (14.04 in) of rain recorded at Glasnevin, County Dublin.
- The longest drought in Ireland occurred in Limerick between 3 April 1938 and 10 May 1938 (37 days).
- The greatest monthly total was 790.0 mm (31.10 in); recorded at the Cummeragh Mountains, County Kerry, in October 1996.
- The greatest annual total was 3,964.9 mm (156.10 in); recorded at Ballaghbeena Gap in 1960.
- The greatest daily total was 243.5 mm (9.59 in); recorded at Cloone Lake, County Kerry, on 18 September 1993.

=== Snowfall ===
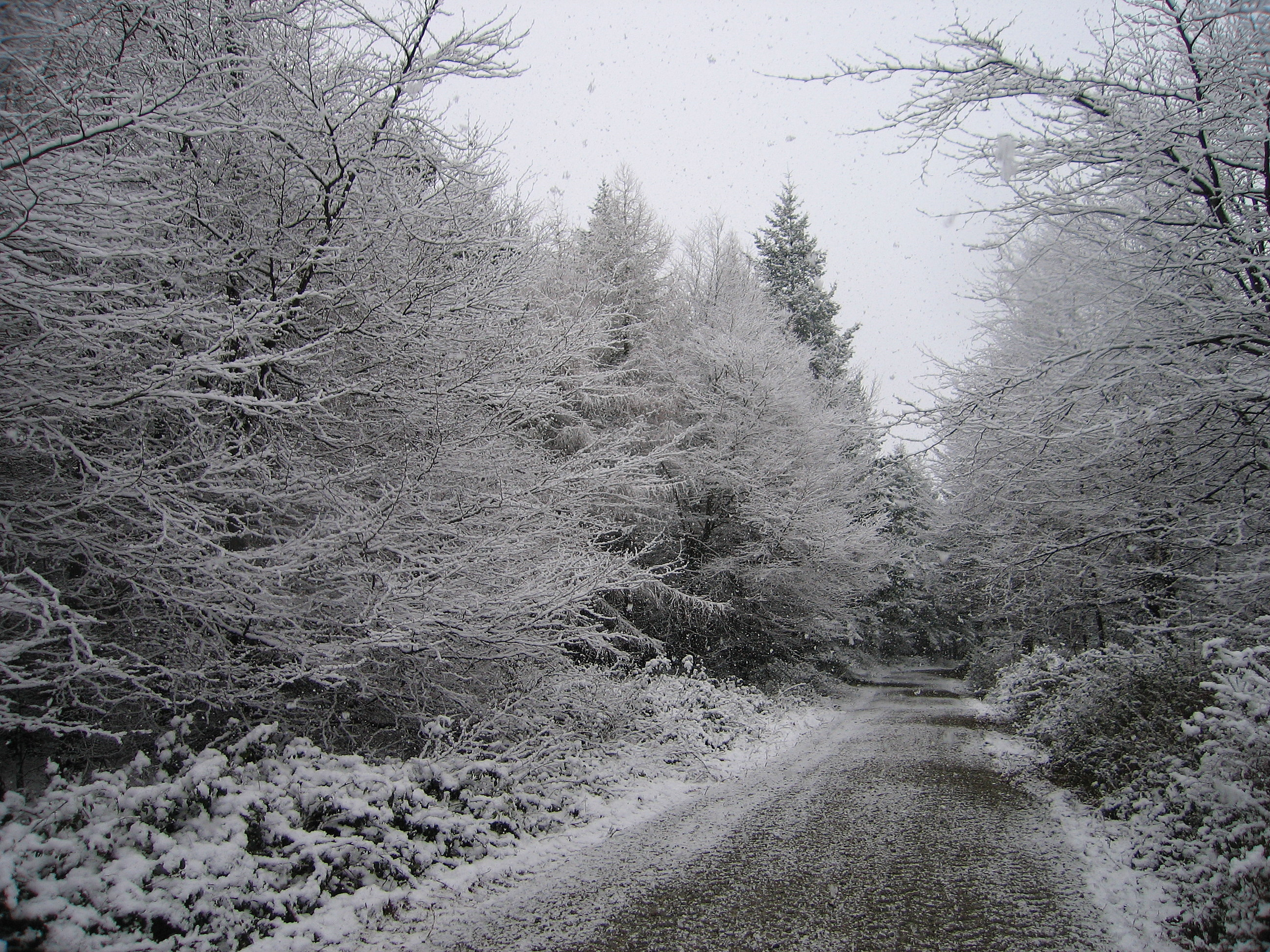
Snow in Wicklow

Severe cold weather is uncommon in Ireland with the majority of winter precipitation coming in the form of rain, although hills and mountainous regions in the country can commonly see up to 30 days of snowfall annually: the Wicklow Mountains region sometimes experiences 50 or more days of snowfall each year. Most low-lying regions of the island only see a few days of lying snow per year (from December to March inclusive), or may see no snow at all during some winters.

However, there are preparations for snow and ice, including the distribution of grit, salt, and other snow-treatable minerals. In late 2011, the Irish Government set up "Winter-Ready", in order to prepare the country for such severe weather.

Due to its variability (which is mainly because of the influence of the Atlantic Ocean, Gulf Stream and North Atlantic Drift, as well as Ireland's northerly latitude and vulnerability to Siberian/Arctic winds) Ireland's weather during the winter months is difficult to predict. The aforementioned factors make both extremely low temperatures and relatively mild temperatures possible.

The snowiest weather station is Clones, County Monaghan, which receives, on average, 18 days of snow and/or sleet per year. Of these, 6.2 days have snow lying at 09:00. The least snowy weather station is Valentia Island, County Kerry; which receives, on average, 5.6 days of snow and/or sleet per year. Of these, 0.8 days have snow lying at 09:00.

=== Hail ===
Hail, like snow and sleet, is also rare in Ireland; however, it can occur at any time of the year. It is most common in spring during thunderstorms.

Malin Head, County Donegal receives the most hail, with an average of 48.4 days per year.

Roche's Point, County Cork receives the least hail, with an average of 8.0 days per year.

=== Thunderstorms ===
Thunderstorms are rarer in Ireland than in Mainland Europe and much of the UK. Late Spring and Summer record the most thunderstorm activity in Ireland and surrounding maritime regions.

Cork Airport, County Cork experiences the least thunder; receiving it 3.7 days per year on average.

Valentia Island, County Kerry experiences the most thunder; receiving it 7.1 days per year on average.

== Wind ==
Generally, the coast tends to be windier than inland areas, and the west tends to be windier than the east.

The station with the highest mean wind speed is Malin Head, County Donegal, averaging at 16.3 kn (30.2 km/h; 18.8 mph). Malin Head also receives the most gale-force winds, recording them on average 66.0 days per year.

The station with the lowest mean wind speed is Kilkenny, County Kilkenny; averaging at 6.5 kn (12.0 km/h; 7.5 mph).

The station that records the lowest number of gale-force winds is Birr, County Offaly; recording them on average 1.2 days per year.

The highest wind speed ever recorded in Ireland was 182 km/h (98 kn; 113 mph) in Limerick (at Foynes Airport) on 18 January 1945.

Tornadoes are very rare in Ireland, with around less than ten reported every year - mostly in August.

== Fog ==
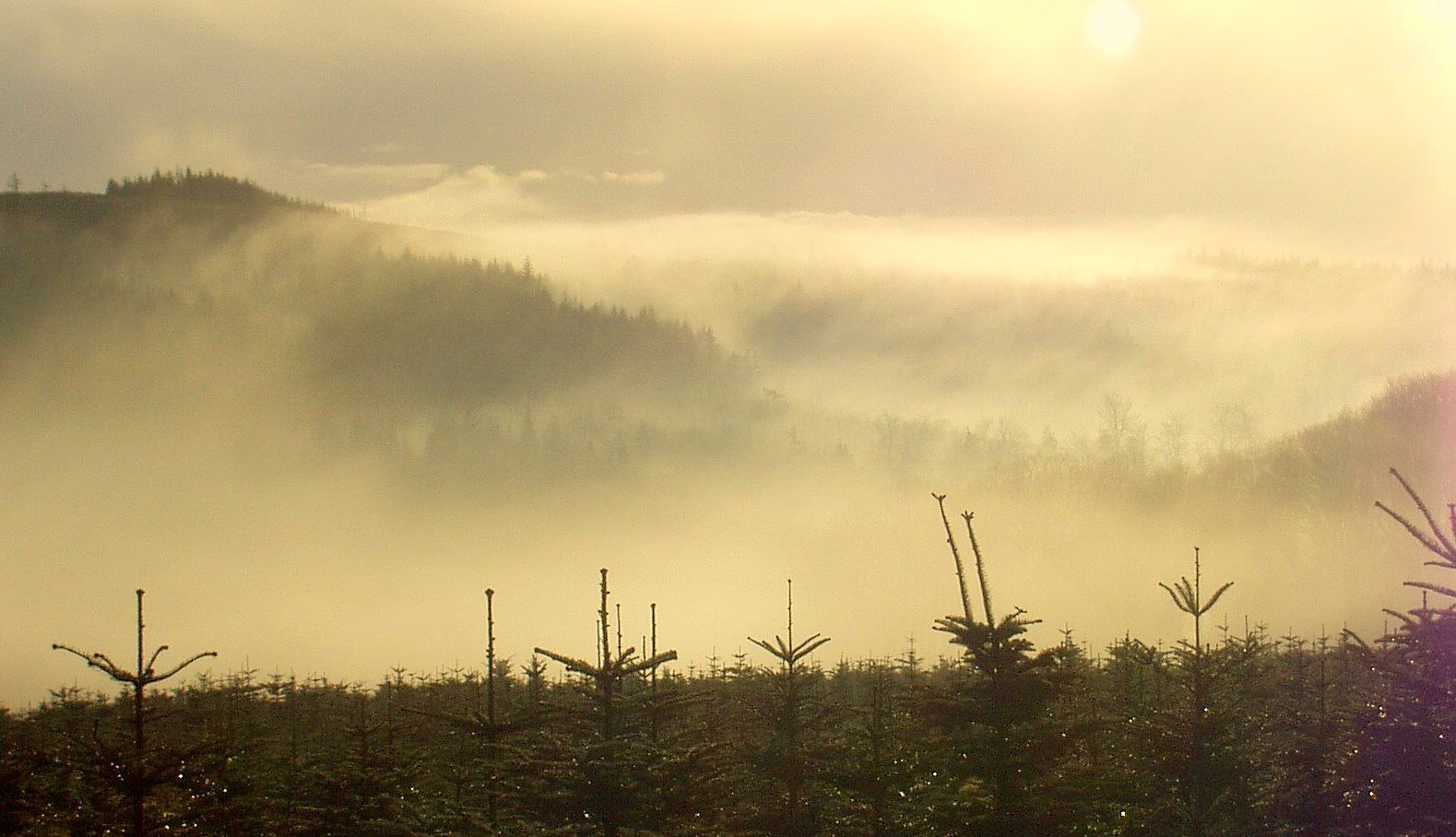
Fog in the Wicklow Mountains

Fog is more common inland and on higher altitudes; mainly during winter and during the morning at times of high pressure.

The foggiest station is that at Cork Airport, County Cork, which has 99.5 days of fog per year.

The least foggy station is that at Valentia Island, County Kerry, which has 8.9 days of fog per year.

== Visibility ==
Visibility is generally very good, because of the proximity of industry to the coast, allowing breezes to disperse any smog. Mist and fog often occur, as well as coastal fog in the east, but it is generally not long-lasting. However, in winter, it can be slow to clear.

== Climate change ==
Climate change may have a range of effects in Ireland. Increasing temperatures may change weather patterns, with the potential for increased heatwaves, rainfall and storm events, with subsequent effects on people through flooding Climate change has been assessed to be the single biggest threat to Ireland, according to the head of the Defence Forces of Ireland, Mark Mellett.

According to studies conducted in 2024, temperature extremes of 34 °C or more are becoming more and more likely in Ireland.

In 2026, a study conducted by Met Éireann predicted that strong heatwaves could push temperatures above 38 °C (100.2 °F) in Ireland by the 2050s.

Ireland was affected by the 2022 European heatwaves#Ireland, the 2025 and the 2026 European heatwaves. As of Met Éireann, the summer 2026 was the hottest since ever since weather records have begun in 1900 and the summer 2025 was the second hottest.

== Climate charts ==
Belmullet (1981-2010)

Climate chart (precipitation, max. and min. temperature)
J	F	M	A	M	J	J	A	S	O	N	D
134 9 4	97 9 4	99 10 5	72 12 6	70 15 8	72 16 10	79 18 12	102 18 12	102 17 11	146 14 8	134 11 6	137 9 4
- █ Average max. and min. temperatures in °C
- █ Precipitation totals in mm
Imperial conversion
J	F	M	A	M	J	J	A	S	O	N	D
5.3 48 39	3.8 48 38	3.9 51 40	2.8 54 42	2.8 58 46	2.8 61 51	3.1 64 54	4 64 54	4 62 51	5.7 57 47	5.3 52 43	5.4 49 40
- █ Average max. and min. temperatures in °F
- █ Precipitation totals in inches

Birr (1979-2008)

Climate chart (precipitation, max. and min. temperature)
J	F	M	A	M	J	J	A	S	O	N	D
79 8 2	59 9 2	67 10 3	55 13 4	60 16 7	67 18 10	59 20 12	82 19 11	66 17 9	94 14 7	75 10 4	84 9 3
- █ Average max. and min. temperatures in °C
- █ Precipitation totals in mm
Imperial conversion
J	F	M	A	M	J	J	A	S	O	N	D
3.1 47 36	2.3 47 36	2.7 51 38	2.2 55 40	2.3 60 44	2.6 64 49	2.3 67 53	3.2 67 52	2.6 63 49	3.7 56 44	2.9 51 39	3.3 47 37
- █ Average max. and min. temperatures in °F
- █ Precipitation totals in inches

Casement Aerodrome (1981-2010)

Climate chart (precipitation, max. and min. temperature)
J	F	M	A	M	J	J	A	S	O	N	D
64 8 2	49 8 2	51 10 3	52 12 4	59 15 7	63 18 9	54 20 12	72 20 11	60 17 10	82 14 7	74 10 4	76 8 2
- █ Average max. and min. temperatures in °C
- █ Precipitation totals in mm
Imperial conversion
J	F	M	A	M	J	J	A	S	O	N	D
2.5 46 36	1.9 47 36	2 50 38	2 54 39	2.3 59 44	2.5 64 49	2.1 68 53	2.8 67 52	2.4 63 49	3.2 56 45	2.9 50 40	3 47 36
- █ Average max. and min. temperatures in °F
- █ Precipitation totals in inches

Clones (1978-2007)

Climate chart (precipitation, max. and min. temperature)
J	F	M	A	M	J	J	A	S	O	N	D
88 7 2	71 8 2	84 10 3	62 12 4	63 15 7	71 17 10	71 19 11	89 19 11	76 17 9	103 13 7	85 10 4	98 8 2
- █ Average max. and min. temperatures in °C
- █ Precipitation totals in mm
Imperial conversion
J	F	M	A	M	J	J	A	S	O	N	D
3.4 45 35	2.8 46 35	3.3 49 37	2.4 54 40	2.5 59 44	2.8 63 49	2.8 67 53	3.5 66 52	3 62 49	4 56 44	3.4 50 39	3.9 46 36
- █ Average max. and min. temperatures in °F
- █ Precipitation totals in inches

Cork Airport (1981-2010)

Climate chart (precipitation, max. and min. temperature)
J	F	M	A	M	J	J	A	S	O	N	D
131 8 3	98 8 3	98 10 4	77 12 5	82 14 7	81 17 10	79 19 12	97 19 12	95 17 10	138 13 8	120 10 5	133 9 4
- █ Average max. and min. temperatures in °C
- █ Precipitation totals in mm
Imperial conversion
J	F	M	A	M	J	J	A	S	O	N	D
5.2 47 37	3.9 47 38	3.8 50 39	3 53 41	3.2 58 45	3.2 63 50	3.1 66 53	3.8 65 53	3.7 62 50	5.4 56 46	4.7 51 41	5.2 47 39
- █ Average max. and min. temperatures in °F
- █ Precipitation totals in inches

Dublin Airport (1981-2010)

Climate chart (precipitation, max. and min. temperature)
J	F	M	A	M	J	J	A	S	O	N	D
63 8 2	49 8 2	53 10 3	54 12 5	60 15 7	67 18 10	56 20 12	73 19 12	60 17 10	79 14 7	73 10 5	73 8 3
- █ Average max. and min. temperatures in °C
- █ Precipitation totals in mm
Imperial conversion
J	F	M	A	M	J	J	A	S	O	N	D
2.5 47 36	1.9 47 36	2.1 50 38	2.1 54 40	2.3 59 44	2.6 64 49	2.2 67 53	2.9 67 53	2.3 63 50	3.1 56 45	2.9 51 40	2.9 47 37
- █ Average max. and min. temperatures in °F
- █ Precipitation totals in inches

Kilkenny (1978-2007)

Climate chart (precipitation, max. and min. temperature)
J	F	M	A	M	J	J	A	S	O	N	D
78 8 2	66 9 2	68 11 3	56 13 4	60 16 7	61 18 9	55 20 11	78 20 11	69 18 9	95 14 7	80 11 4	90 9 2
- █ Average max. and min. temperatures in °C
- █ Precipitation totals in mm
Imperial conversion
J	F	M	A	M	J	J	A	S	O	N	D
3.1 47 35	2.6 47 35	2.7 51 38	2.2 55 40	2.4 60 44	2.4 65 49	2.1 69 52	3.1 68 52	2.7 64 48	3.8 57 44	3.2 51 39	3.6 48 36
- █ Average max. and min. temperatures in °F
- █ Precipitation totals in inches

Malin Head (1981-2010)

Climate chart (precipitation, max. and min. temperature)
J	F	M	A	M	J	J	A	S	O	N	D
117 8 4	85 8 4	86 9 4	63 11 6	57 13 8	69 15 10	77 17 12	93 17 12	92 16 11	118 13 9	105 10 6	114 9 4
- █ Average max. and min. temperatures in °C
- █ Precipitation totals in mm
Imperial conversion
J	F	M	A	M	J	J	A	S	O	N	D
4.6 47 38	3.3 47 38	3.4 49 40	2.5 51 42	2.2 56 46	2.7 59 51	3 62 54	3.7 63 54	3.6 60 52	4.7 55 47	4.1 51 43	4.5 47 40
- █ Average max. and min. temperatures in °F
- █ Precipitation totals in inches

Mullingar (1979-2008)

Climate chart (precipitation, max. and min. temperature)
J	F	M	A	M	J	J	A	S	O	N	D
92 7 2	72 8 2	78 10 3	62 12 4	69 15 6	71 17 9	62 19 11	81 19 11	74 17 9	102 13 6	82 10 4	97 8 2
- █ Average max. and min. temperatures in °C
- █ Precipitation totals in mm
Imperial conversion
J	F	M	A	M	J	J	A	S	O	N	D
3.6 45 35	2.8 46 35	3.1 50 37	2.4 54 39	2.7 59 43	2.8 63 49	2.4 67 52	3.2 66 51	2.9 62 48	4 56 43	3.2 50 38	3.8 46 36
- █ Average max. and min. temperatures in °F
- █ Precipitation totals in inches

Rosslare (1978-2007)

Climate chart (precipitation, max. and min. temperature)
J	F	M	A	M	J	J	A	S	O	N	D
88 9 4	71 9 4	69 10 5	59 11 6	56 14 9	55 16 11	50 18 13	72 19 13	75 17 12	109 14 9	101 11 7	101 10 5
- █ Average max. and min. temperatures in °C
- █ Precipitation totals in mm
Imperial conversion
J	F	M	A	M	J	J	A	S	O	N	D
3.5 48 40	2.8 47 39	2.7 50 41	2.3 52 43	2.2 56 47	2.2 61 52	2 65 55	2.8 65 55	3 62 53	4.3 57 49	4 52 44	4 49 41
- █ Average max. and min. temperatures in °F
- █ Precipitation totals in inches

Shannon Airport (1981-2010)

Climate chart (precipitation, max. and min. temperature)
J	F	M	A	M	J	J	A	S	O	N	D
102 9 3	76 9 3	79 11 5	59 13 6	65 16 8	70 18 11	66 20 13	82 20 13	76 18 11	105 14 8	94 11 6	104 9 4
- █ Average max. and min. temperatures in °C
- █ Precipitation totals in mm
Imperial conversion
J	F	M	A	M	J	J	A	S	O	N	D
4 48 38	3 49 38	3.1 52 40	2.3 56 42	2.6 61 47	2.7 65 52	2.6 68 55	3.2 67 55	3 64 51	4.1 58 47	3.7 52 42	4.1 48 38
- █ Average max. and min. temperatures in °F
- █ Precipitation totals in inches

Valentia Island (1981-2010)

Climate chart (precipitation, max. and min. temperature)
J	F	M	A	M	J	J	A	S	O	N	D
174 10 5	124 10 5	124 11 5	97 13 6	94 15 8	95 17 11	99 18 13	115 18 13	125 17 11	177 14 9	169 12 7	165 10 5
- █ Average max. and min. temperatures in °C
- █ Precipitation totals in mm
Imperial conversion
J	F	M	A	M	J	J	A	S	O	N	D
6.8 50 40	4.9 50 40	4.9 52 42	3.8 55 43	3.7 59 47	3.8 62 51	3.9 65 55	4.5 65 55	4.9 63 52	7 58 48	6.7 53 44	6.5 51 42
- █ Average max. and min. temperatures in °F
- █ Precipitation totals in inches

Climate data for Dublin (Secondary Climatological Surface Parameters)
Month	Jan	Feb	Mar	Apr	May	Jun	Jul	Aug	Sep	Oct	Nov	Dec	Year
Mean number of days with precipitation > 10.0 mm (0.39 in)	1.3	1.1	1.0	1.1	1.3	1.9	1.4	2.0	1.7	2.1	2.2	1.7	18.8
Mean number of days with Max temperature > 25.0 °C (77.0 °F)	0.0	0.0	0.0	0.0	0.0	0.2	0.6	0.3	0.0	0.0	0.0	0.0	1.1
Mean number of days with Min temperature < 0.0 °C (32.0 °F)	7.1	7.2	5.5	3.9	0.5	0.0	0.0	0.0	0.0	0.8	3.3	6.7	35
Mean number of days with thunder	0.2	0.2	0.3	0.2	0.7	0.6	0.9	1.0	0.2	0.3	0.3	0.2	5.1
Mean number of days with hail	1.1	1.5	1.8	2.0	1.0	0.1	0.2	0.1	0.1	0.2	0.4	0.7	9.2
Mean number of days with fog	2.4	2.4	3.4	2.6	2.4	2.2	2.3	2.8	3.4	2.6	2.3	3.4	32.2
Mean number of days with wind speed > 10 m/s (36 km/h)	18	15.9	15.7	12.2	11	8.9	8.5	9.5	10.3	13.4	14.7	16	154.1
Mean wind speed	6.3	6.2	5.9	5.3	5.1	4.7	4.7	4.7	4.9	5.4	5.8	6	5.4
Average sea temperature °C (°F)	9.6 (49.3)	8.8 (47.8)	8.4 (47.1)	9.1 (48.4)	10.4 (50.7)	12.3 (54.1)	14.1 (57.4)	14.9 (58.8)	14.8 (58.6)	14.1 (57.4)	13.1 (55.6)	11.3 (52.3)	11.7 (53.1)
Mean daily daylight hours	8.0	10.0	12.0	14.0	16.0	17.0	16.0	15.0	13.0	11.0	9.0	8.0	12.4
Average Ultraviolet index	0	1	2	4	5	6	6	5	4	2	1	0	3
Source: NOAA Weather Atlas(daylight-sea temperature-UV)

== See also ==
- Geography of Ireland
- Climate change in the Republic of Ireland
