= Victoria Proof of age card =

Australian identification card

Victoria Proof of Age card
- Both sides of a Victoria Proof of Age card
- Type: photo card
- Issued by: Victoria
- Purpose: Identification
- Eligibility: Residents of Victoria aged 18 or over
- Expiration: No expiry
- Cost: $10
- Website: https://service.vic.gov.au/find-services/personal/apply-for-a-proof-of-age-card

The Victoria Proof of Age card serves as an identity photo card for residents of Victoria, Australia, who are aged over 18 years. It is available to drivers and non-drivers; however, it is aimed at people who do not have a driver's licence. It displays the holder's name, address, date of birth and signature.
