= Roche's Point Lighthouse =

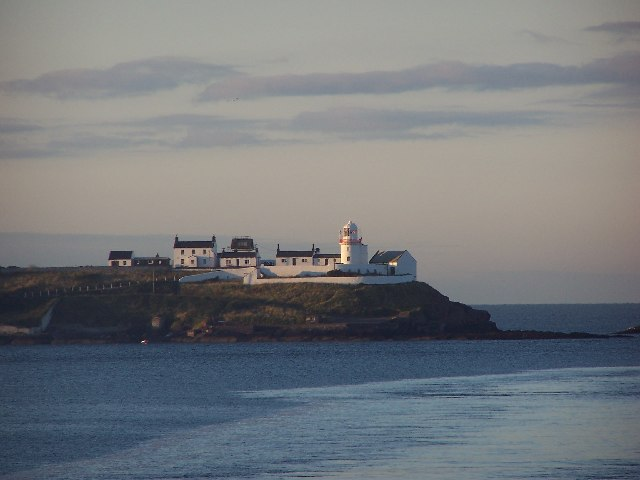
- Roche's Point lighthouse seen from the Swansea-Cork ferry
- Location: Cork Harbour, Ireland
- Coordinates: 51°47′34.8″N 8°15′16.6″W

Tower
- Constructed: c. 1835
- Construction: masonry
- Automated: 1995
- Height: 15 metres (49 ft)
- Shape: cylindrical tower with balcony and lantern
- Markings: white painted
- Fog signal: deactivated on 11 January 2011

Light
- Focal height: 30 metres (98 ft)
- Range: 20 nautical miles (white light); 16 nautical miles red light
- Characteristic: Fl WR 3s
- Ireland no.: CIL-0250

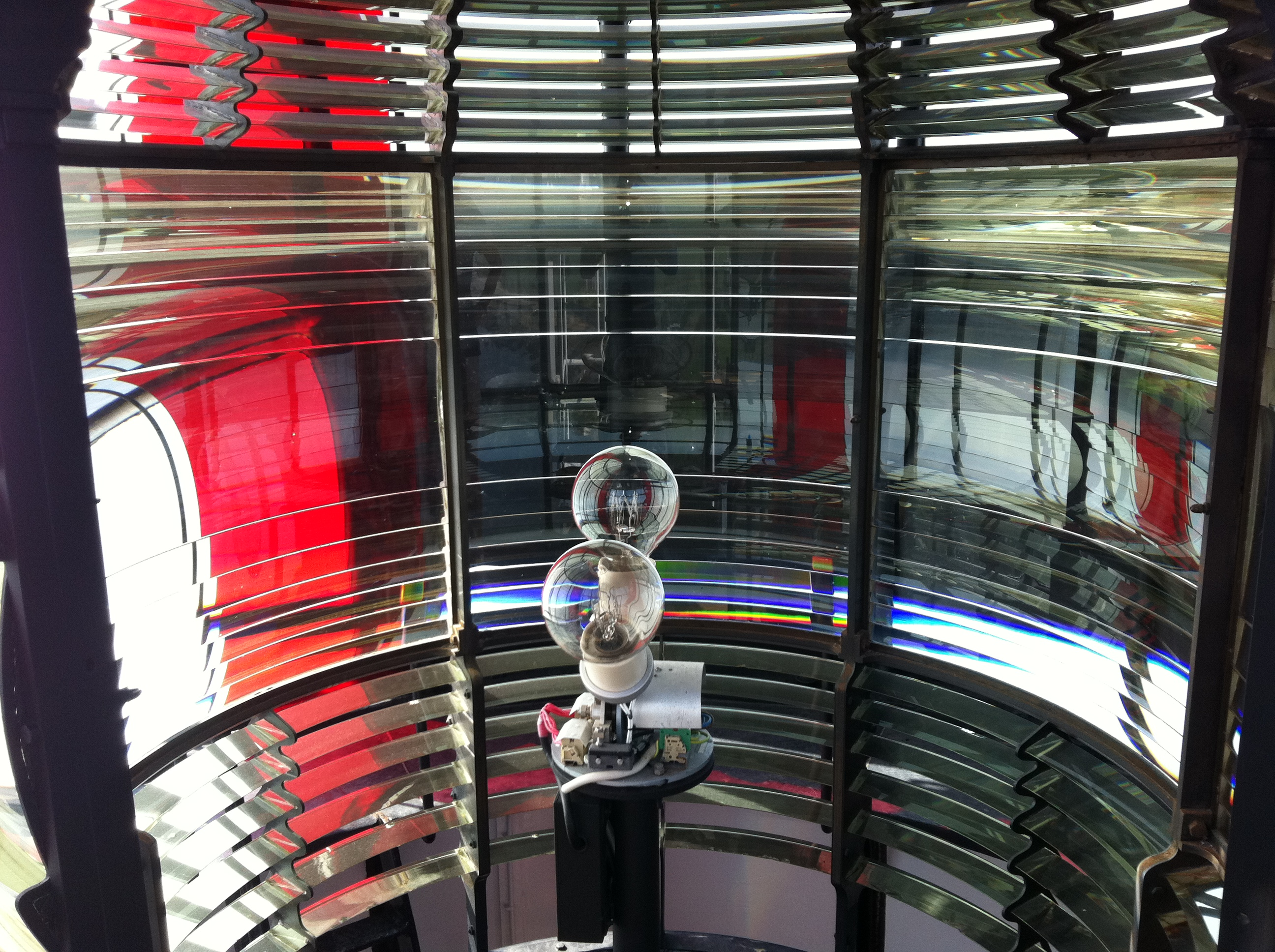
Lightbulb inside Fresnel lens at Roche's Point

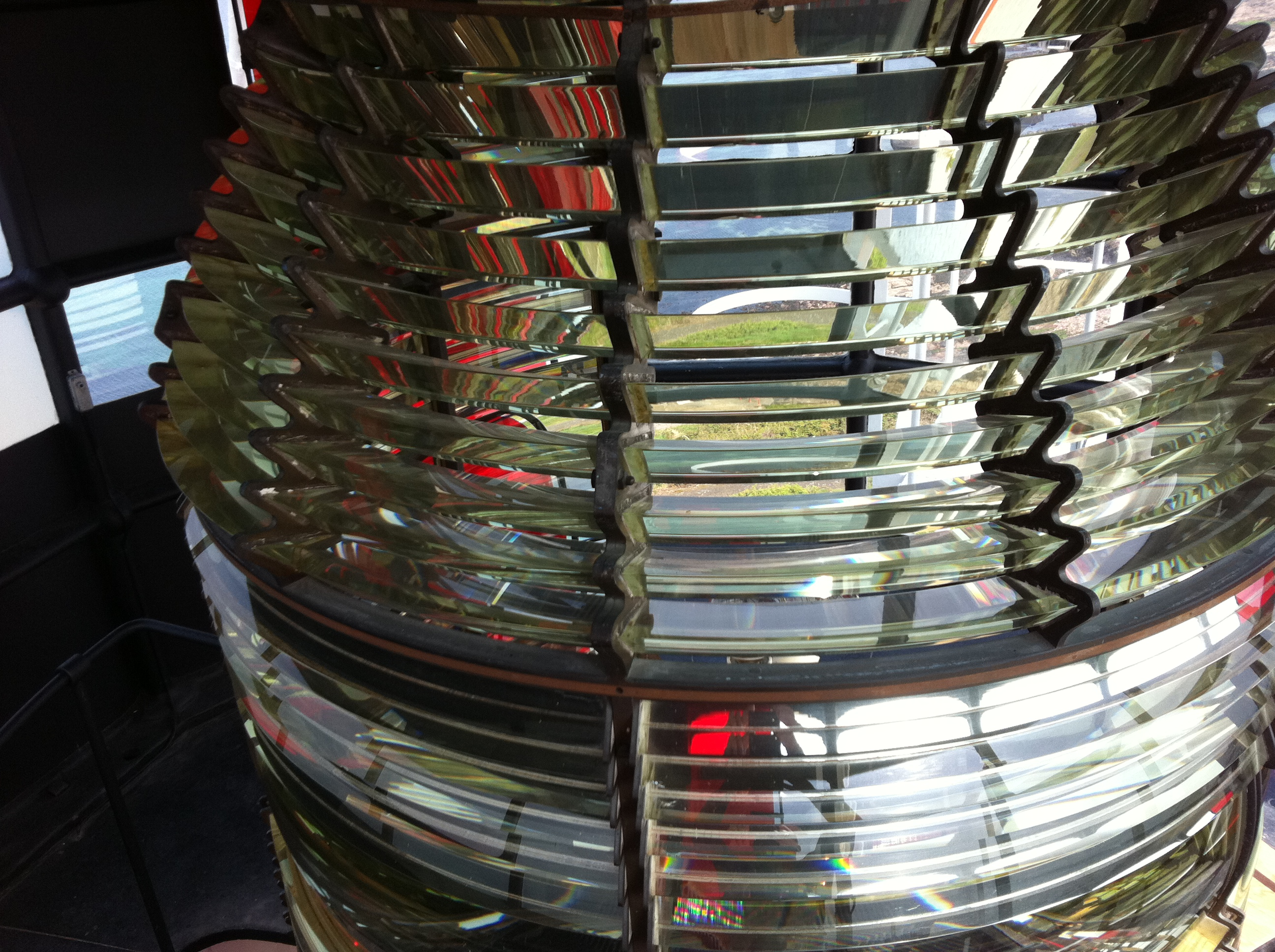
Second order Fresnel lens at Roche's Point lighthouse

Roche's Point Lighthouse is situated at the entrance to Cork Harbour, Ireland. A lighthouse was first established on 4 June 1817 to guide ships into Cork Harbour. The original tower was deemed too small and in 1835 was replaced by the larger present tower which is 49 feet high with a diameter of 12 feet. Roche's Point Lighthouse, and a number of other structures, are located on a headland of the same name.

== Light ==
The original light apparatus consisted of ten Argand oil lamps and ten catoptric reflectors. In 1876 the optic was changed to a Second Order Fresnel lens, which is still in use. The lighthouse was converted to electric in 1970. The character of the light was occulting 20s (on for 15 seconds and off for 5 seconds). This was altered on 15 August 1993 to Fl WR 3s (one white and red flash every three seconds). From April 1978 the light has also been exhibited in conditions of poor visibility while the fog signal was sounding. Roche's Point has red sectors built into the main light to mark navigational hazards approaching the harbour such as the Daunt Rock near Robert's Cove and the Cow and Calf rocks just below the lighthouse. The sectors are as follows:

- Red: shore-292°
- White: 292°-016° (84°)
- Red: 016°-033° (17°)
- White: 033°-159° (126°)
- Red: 159°-shore

The part of the light that is seen from land is unintensified so as not to disturb those on shore. The light at full intensity (facing sea) has a range of 20 nautical miles for the white light (37.04 km) and 17 nautical miles for the red sector (31.5 km). The light is 30 meters above high water and continues to be exhibited by day in periods of poor visibility and at night. The lighthouse, compound walls and adjacent buildings are painted white for daytime conspicuousness.

The Roche's Point lighthouse was automated in 1995. Apart from the engine house and adjacent building, all the other buildings were sold at public auction.

On 26 July 2017 Irish Lights issued a Notice to Mariners that on 18 October the current electric bulb within the Fresnel Lens would be changed to an LED bulb created by the General Lighthouse Authorities. Due to storms Ophelia, Brian and Caroline in Ireland, this had been postponed. On Monday 26 February 2018 the new LED bulb developed by R&RNAV was installed at Roche's Point. The LED bulb uses significantly less electricity for almost the same visual range and has a life of about 10 years. The new bulb was placed into the centre of the second order Fresnel lens to maintain the long range of the light. This retention of the lens contrasts with the approach at some lighthouses where traditional lenses have been removed and replaced with new LED apparatus.

== Fog signals ==
A bell was established at Roche's Point in 1864 to warn mariners in poor visibility. This was replaced by a siren fog signal on 1 December 1898. The fog signal changed again in 1949 when a diaphone was installed with a character of one two-second blast every thirty seconds. In 1995 when the lighthouse was automated an electric fog signal (ELG 300–04) replaced the diaphone. This electric fog signal was connected to a fog detector which activated the fog signal if visibility fell below three nautical miles. The electric fog signal had a range of four nautical miles. On 11 January 2011 the Commissioners of Irish Lights, despite much opposition, discontinued all Irish fog signals. This brought an end to a long era of fog signaling at Roche's Point.

== Lighthouse keeper ==
Jim Power was the last keeper before its automation and later became the lighthouse attendant.

On 4 June 2017 (marking the 200 anniversary since the lighthouse's establishment on 4 June 1817), there was an open day at the lighthouse, with 1,500 visitors given the chance to climb the lighthouse to the balcony. Former lighthouse keepers were present for the open day.
