= South Australia proof of age card =

Identification card

South Australia Proof of age card
- Both sides of the proof of age card
- Type: Photo card
- Issued by: South Australia
- Purpose: Identification
- Eligibility: Residents of SA aged 17 years 11 months or over
- Expiration: No expiry
- Cost: $25
- Website: www.sa.gov.au/topics/driving-and-transport/licences/proof-of-age-card

The South Australia Proof of age card is an identity photo card available to residents of South Australia over the age of 18. It is available to drivers and non-drivers primarily as an identity document and to access places restricted to persons over the age of 18.

A key convenience of the card is that it can be obtained through an online application if the applicant has a drivers licence.

You can apply for your proof of age card at 17 years and 11 months old.
