= Alcoholism in Ireland =

Public health issue in Ireland

Alcoholism in Ireland is a significant public health problem. In 2021, 70% of Irish men and 34% of Irish women aged 15+ were considered to be hazardous drinkers. In the same age group, there are over 150,000 Irish people who are classified as 'dependent drinkers'. According to Eurostat, 24% of Ireland's population engages in heavy episodic drinking at least once a month, compared to the European average of 19%.

Alcohol is both an important economic industry for Ireland and a key facilitator for social interactions. Alcohol abuse is a problem in Ireland, with Ireland having the 17th highest rate of pure alcohol consumption in Europe. Alcohol abuse creates extensive problems on the Irish medical services, and alcoholism is implicated in at least three deaths a day in Ireland.

The reasons for excessive alcohol consumption in Ireland are varied. It is not possible to attribute one single cause to alcohol abuse; while historically the influence of British cultural practises combined with the poor climate of Ireland have been thought to play a major role in excessive Irish alcohol consumption, parental and older sibling attitudes play a more important role.

== Historical context ==
Alcohol consumption in Ireland witnessed a dramatic upsurge in the 18th century among the working class living in urban slums, who used alcohol to cope with their living conditions. Pubs became frequented by male working class patrons, leading to their association with masculinity and class. Although the population of Ireland grew 50% in the 18th century, the consumption of whiskey grew by 750%, with the mass industrialization of whiskey manufacturing and subsequent reduced prices exacerbating the problem.

In Irish history, the Catholic Church attempted to suppress alcoholism in Ireland by encouraging some young Catholics to swear oaths of abstinence from alcohol. It was believed this would help contain the problem of excessive alcohol consumption. Furthermore, geographical areas that had higher Catholic populations, generally had lower drinking rates. Higher attendance at mass was associated with lower consumption levels of alcohol.

Furthermore, the Catholic Church in Ireland promoted alcohol abstinence organisations such as the Pioneer Total Abstinence Association (PTAA), which claimed 360,000 members by 1948.

Protestant led movements were also a major force advocating for temperance in Ireland. Their tactics included promoting the consumption of lower-concentration alcoholic beverages such as beer and wine rather than whiskey, highlighting the health concerns of excess whiskey consumption, and proposing legislation limiting alcohol consumption. Some Catholic groups joined the movement in the 19th century, with the goal of liberating their country from the English by curbing what they perceived as morally decadent behaviour brought on by alcohol consumption, as well to combat the prevailing stereotypes of the Irish that they believed facilitated their oppression by the English.

Historically, the influence of British cultural practises (particularly during the plantations of Ireland) combined with the climate of Ireland have played a major role in excessive Irish alcohol consumption. Areas that had higher historical exposure to British cultural practises, which one study measured by whether a town had been host to games of cricket or not, tended to have higher consumption rates of alcohol. It is believed that the influence of British culture through things like sporting events promoted a drinking culture.

Another factor associated with higher rates of alcohol consumption in Ireland has been the proximity of brewing and distilling locations. Studies show that towns with the highest alcohol consumption were historically closest to brewing and distilling locations. Because it was less costly to transport alcohol to towns closer to these production facilities, alcohol was cheaper there, and therefore people in those towns tended to consume larger amounts of alcohol than elsewhere.

During the 20th century, both civil society organisations and the government sought to increase the availability of treatment and services for individuals suffering from alcohol dependency. The first Irish chapter of Alcoholics Anonymous was established in 1940 in Dublin, and there are now over 864 meeting groups around the country. In 1945, the Mental Treatment Act was passed, which gave legal recognition to the problem of alcoholism. The Mental Treatment Act introduced two new procedures for admitting people with alcohol abuse problems to hospital, even if they were unwilling to enter and didn't believe they had a mental health problem. The first procedure involved the examination of a patient by a health-professional within 24 hours of an application for entrance to hospital. If a patient required admission to hospital, under the Mental Treatment Act, a district mental health medical officer examined them and determined the appropriate treatment was. A patient was then admitted for an indefinite period. The second procedure enabled the detainment of a 'temporary patient', in hospital for up to six months. The Act acknowledged, and sought to address, the challenges of getting people to voluntarily accept treatment for alcohol abuse. More broadly, it acknowledged that excessive alcohol use was a problem in Ireland, and was an initial measure of government support for alcohol abuse treatment.

Excessive alcohol consumption has almost tripled in Ireland since 1960. Since the early 2000s, however, rates of alcohol consumption have been declining across Ireland, with levels dropping to 10.9 litres of pure alcohol consumption in 2015. This has largely been attributed to the implementation of taxes imposed on alcoholic beverages. However, when the price of alcohol dropped again in 2016, consumption levels increased sharply to nearly 11.5 litres of pure alcohol consumption a year.

== Social concerns ==
Alcohol is implicated in a variety of social concerns in Ireland. The consumption of alcohol is a cultural norm, that is believed to have developed through religious customs of the society. Alcohol consumption in Ireland is considered a vital part of social interactions and social life.

Children are particularly affected by alcohol abuse in Ireland, with parental drinking and alcoholism identified as a key problem for child welfare. Children with parents who engage in regular, dangerous drinking, which is defined by the survey as individuals who drink more than 75 grams of alcohol on a single occasion once per month, were most likely to be harmed. 11.2% of children with parents who drink alcohol excessively reported being verbally abused. Alcohol is understood by the Irish government as a significant factor that contributes to cases of child neglect. Many forms of assault which can include sexual assaults, rape, domestic violence and manslaughter are linked to the consumption of alcohol.

Nearly 7% of children of parents who consumed alcohol have been left in unsafe situations. 3.4% of these children have been physically abused and 5.5% have witnessed violence.

As a part of a study conducted by the Health Service Executive, many children were interviewed. Over 10% of these children had experienced various harm as a result of someone else's drinking.

Alcohol is a major factor in affecting civil order and policing, and is implicated in the majority of offences. The biggest social problem that alcohol abuse contributes to, is physical assault. For men aged between 18 and 29, 1 in 5 have been physically assaulted where alcohol has been a factor in the assault. Alcohol also contributes to many social problems, like family problems. 20.8% of women aged 18–29 report family problems related to alcohol. A survey done by the Irish Health Research Board showed that the people most likely to experience harm due to alcohol were between 18–29 years of age, however people who are older than 50 years old are the least likely to report problems relating to alcohol.

Alcohol-related inefficiency or harm in the workplace is understood as a major problem in Ireland. Many young people report negative consequences or dangerous situations experienced in the workplace as a consequence of co-workers who are heavily dependent on alcohol or suffering alcohol addiction problems. Many people report that their ability to complete their work and fulfil their employment obligations is affected by a co-worker's drinking, with 15% of women, and 8% of men aged 18–34 reporting this as a problem.

== Economic benefits of the alcohol industry ==
Despite problems caused by alcohol abuse in Ireland, the alcohol industry remains a vital element of the country's economy. As of 2013, the Irish alcohol industry had exports worth over 1 billion euros. Over 92,000 jobs are generated by the alcohol industry, and it supports, both directly and indirectly, the Irish tourism sector. Iconic products like Guinness beer, Bailey's liqueur and Jameson whiskey are all well-known Irish products that contribute to tourism and the Irish economy.

75% of beverage exports from Ireland are from the alcoholic beverage industry. These beverages go to over one hundred different markets internationally.

Since 2001, alcohol consumption has been in constant decline, with current levels of consumption nearly 24% less than what they were in 2001. The overall decline in alcohol consumption has led to a significant shift in how alcohol is consumed in Ireland, and is creating concern among producers and vendors.

According to the Alcohol Beverage Federation of Ireland, the industry supports over "7457 public houses, 641 hotel bars, 52 000 jobs in on-trade retailers and 2458 fully licensed restaurants". The industry also makes contributions to the workforce by creating 92,000 jobs a year, supporting over 12 thousand farms and families, and creating demand for products like apples, barley and milk to produce alcohol.

== Health problems ==
Alcohol-related harm contributes to many health problems in Ireland. Every day, approximately three people in Ireland die from alcohol-related causes. For men aged between 15 and 39, nearly a quarter of all deaths are a consequence of alcohol-related harm. More than 1.35 million Irish people are engaging in harmful drinking activities, and over 30% say they experience harm stemming from their own drinking habits. A study carried out between 1997 and 2010 found that there were 3289 admissions to hospitals due to acute alcohol problems. Of those admissions, 43.6% of people were younger than 30 years old and over 10% of patients were under 18 years old.

A task force was established in Ireland, which showed that between 1989 and 1999, the average consumption of alcohol per capita increased by 41% in Ireland. Reasons given for the increase in alcohol consumption included that across the country, the nation had become more affluent, alcohol taxes had declined and there was greater access for people to alcohol due to longer opening hours in stores. Surveys conducted by the Irish Department of Health found that young people didn't drink as frequently as older age groups, but when they did, were more likely to engage in binge drinking. This resulted in more risky alcohol consumption in younger age groups, and more dangerous alcohol consumption among women than men in Ireland.

Binge drinking is understood as a normal activity in Ireland, with over 58% of drinking occasions resulting in binge drinking. Current research shows that many attendees at the accident or emergency departments in Ireland are there due to excessive consumption of alcohol. Furthermore, studies are finding that high alcohol consumption per capita is contributing to specific diseases, such as oral cancer and liver disease.

== Support services ==
There are many services available to people suffering from alcohol abuse in Ireland. Both private and public health offer support to those suffering substance addiction problems.

Al-Anon is a service that provides support and assistance for families and friends of people with drinking problems in an anonymous situation. It cares for parents, children, spouses and friends. Al-Anon also has a sector for teenagers and people aged 12–17 suffering from problematic drinking habits or dealing with people suffering alcohol abuse.

Additionally, Alcoholics Anonymous is a well-established service in Ireland. They offer support to anyone suffering because of their drinking. The service works on a mutual support basis, where fellowships and groups work together to help members become sober and stay away from alcohol. The initiative does not have membership fees.

Various charities exist in Ireland aimed at helping to stop alcohol-related harm and alcohol abuse. The Alcohol Forum is one of these charities. The charity is based in North West Ireland and aims to reduce alcohol consumption levels by mobilising the community and prompting the community to take action on alcohol-related problems. Additionally, the Irish Bishops Drugs Initiative aims to mobilise communities to respond to alcohol and drug problems. They do this through peer education, a confirmation programme and a parental awareness program.

In Ireland's capital, Dublin, there are other specific services aimed at helping individuals. SASSY is a service that provides aid and support to young people under 18 years of age who are suffering as a result of drug or alcohol use. The Youth Drug and Alcohol Service is based in Dublin and assists those under 18 years of age who are suffering problems related to the consumption of alcohol or use of drugs.

Local mental health services are also available to people suffering mental illness and alcoholism, who can then refer people to specialist addiction services if necessary. Addiction counselling is provided in Ireland to those who require it, as well as detoxification, which is intent on stopping cravings and urges to consume alcohol, a symptom of an addiction. Detoxification is closely supervised and monitored by a General Practitioner, and generally requires the prescription of strong anti-anxiety drugs to attempt to minimise the effects of substance withdrawal. Sometimes, medication is prescribed to help the initial stages of treatment.

Residential programmes exist to remove an individual from their everyday environment and any access to alcohol while they attempt to deal with their alcohol abuse problems. Other group meetings are run separately to the Health Service Executive, which provide support to those many people affected by problematic drinking.

There are private treatment services for those suffering alcohol addiction, and they provide similar support to the services the Health Service Executive provides. Private treatment is not free, and the costs depend on the programme.

The alcohol addiction services run by Local Health Offices are public services, and therefore do not cost money to patients seeking assistance. For some residential or privately run programmes, costs can be incurred. For many people, private health insurance may cover stays in some selected drug treatment centres.

Success of these various treatments generally requires counselling treatments to help sufferers understand their addiction, and change their behaviour accordingly. General Practitioners generally advise on the most suitable treatment; if a patient presents themselves to their GP, they can receive initial help and support.
