= Australian state and territory issued identity photo cards =

Australian identification card

Australian Photo Card
- Type: Photo Card
- Issued by: States and Territories of Australia
- Purpose: Identification
- Eligibility: Residents of States and Territories of Australia. Age restrictions may apply depending on state or territory – see article.

Australian state and territory issued identity photo cards (also known as Proof of Age Cards or by other names) are photo identification cards issued by the states and territories of Australia. While the drivers license is similar to the photo identity card, the photo identity card is treated separately here.

== Description ==
While each state and territory has differing rules and laws concerning the issue of these cards, they all have a number of generally common features. First, they are issued by the government of the concerned state or territory to residents of that state or territory. Second, they are voluntary: there is no statutory requirement to hold the card, but there is a fee to obtain one. Third, they are issued by and are closely associated with the state or territorial government agency responsible for the issuing of drivers licences, and are often similar to, produced on the same material as, and maintained on the same systems, as drivers licences. They universally show the photo of the individual, a signature, and their date of birth, and are credit card sized.

From 1 March 2017, all states and territories of Australia allow the issue of the card regardless of whether or not the holder has a drivers licence.

The following lists the different cards and the details.

State or territory	Name of card	Minimum age*	Available to drivers	Validity (years)	Shows address	Shows Sex	Notes	Cost	Ref
Australian Capital Territory	Proof of Identity Card	18	Yes	No expiry	Yes	No		$7	
New South Wales	Photo card	16	Yes	5 or 10	Yes	No	10 year validity if over 21	Variable	
Northern Territory	Evidence of age card	18	Yes	5	No	No		$28	
Queensland	Photo identification card	15	Yes	10	Optional	No	Applicants will be asked if they want the residential address to be shown on the back of the card.	$77.40	
South Australia	Proof of age card	18	Yes	No expiry	Yes	No	Apply online if Driver	$25	
Tasmania	Personal Information Card	No Minimum	Yes	5		No		$29	
Victoria	Proof of age card	18	Yes	No expiry	Yes	No		$10	
Western Australia	Photo card	16	Yes	5	Yes	No	Available with or without address or both	$46.80	

- Minimum age of 18 – some states allow application 1 month early for a delivery/pick up on or after the holder's 18th birthday.

== Future purpose ==
The photo card may become the de facto identity card once drivers licences become electronic, especially as some states such as NSW are encouraging the issue of such cards along with drivers licences at a nominal fee.

== Document Verification Service ==
The Attorney-General's Department provides a document verification service that allows for validation of some licences.

== See also ==
- Identity documents of Australia
- Australia Post Keypass identity card
- Driving licence in Australia
