= Liquor Act 2019 =

Law of the Northern Territory, Australia

Liquor Act 2019 (NT)

Northern Territory Legislative Assembly
- Long title: An Act to govern the sale, supply, service, promotion and consumption of all forms of liquor and alcohol products for the purpose of minimising their associated harm and for related purposes
- Citation: No. 95 of 2019
- Territorial extent: Northern Territory
- Passed: 13 August 2019
- Assented to: 3 September 2019
- Commenced: 1 October 2019
- Introduced by: Natasha Fyles MLA, Attorney-General and Minister for Justice
- Introduced: 15 May 2019

Amended by
- Liquor Legislation Amendment (Repeal of Minimum Pricing) Act 2025
- Status: Amended

The Liquor Act 2019 (No. 95) (NT) is an act enacted and signed into legislation by the Northern Territory Legislative Assembly in 2019, which introduced a statutory minimum price for alcohol in order to counter alcohol problems.

== Background ==
In 2010, a report was published into alcohol culture in the Northern Territory, suggesting that alcohol was one of the main causes of indigenous child abuse in the territory. The territory reportedly measured the highest proportion of deaths due to alcohol consumption across all jurisdictions in Australia,

In 2013, the Chief Minister of the Northern Territory described drinking culture as a "core social value" of the Northern Territory. The Northern Territory has had a long history of alcohol abuse, with a percentage of 44.

=== Riley Review ===
In October 2017, the Riley review into alcohol legislation in the territory was published. The report recommended sweeping changes to the Liquor Act 1978.

== Impact ==
Initially there was a community backlash against the act - several Territory Labor Party members of the Legislative Assembly acknowledged that communication around the act had not been handled well, that the party was 'in a muddle'.

Three years after the introduction of the policy, a review painted a mixed picture of the success of minimum unit pricing, noting that the COVID-19 pandemic had creating confounding factors which meant all available results were significantly reduced.

The increase of the price from the initial value of AU$1.30 to AU$1.50 gave researchers a second chance to study the impact of the increased minimum price.

== Repeal ==
Provisions relating to minimum pricing of alcohol were repealed in 2025 by the Liquor Legislation Amendment (Repeal of Minimum Pricing) Act 2025.
