= Driver's licences in Australia =

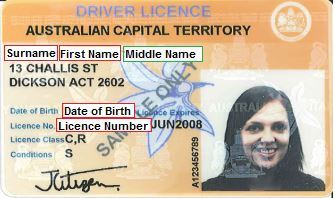
A driver's licence issued by the Australian Capital Territory.

Driver's licences in Australia refer to the official permit required for a person to legally drive a motor vehicle in Australia. The issue of driver's licences, alongside the regulation and enforcement of road use, are all managed by state and territory governments.

As no Australia-wide licensing scheme exists, rules for the issue of licences vary by jurisdiction. Nevertheless, licences are generally recognised and valid in other states and territories. Since 1997, nationwide uniform arrangements have been in place for the regulation of full driver's licences for motor vehicles, as well as their renewal.

Australia's lack of identity cards has led to driving licences becoming the de facto photo ID used in everyday situations. In 2017, the federal government proposed creation of a national drivers licence database that would involve state or territory governments handing over the identities of drivers in a stated bid to toughen national security laws. The national ID database would be used to monitor public events, but could be transferred to a national drivers licence system with agreement from the states.

== Classes of licences ==
All states and territories in Australia have a uniform driver licence system.

Class	Type	Description
C	Car licence	Covers vehicles up to 4.5 tonnes gross vehicle mass (GVM) and tow a single trailer up to 9 tonnes GVM or to the manufacturer's specifications (whichever is less). 13.5 tonnes max GCM. The licence allows the holder to drive cars, utilities, vans, some light trucks, car-based motor tricycles, tractors and implements such as graders, vehicles that seat up to 12 adults, including the driver.
R	Rider licence	Applies to motorcycle riders with any registrable motorcycle.
RE	Restricted Rider licence	Covers motorcycles matching the LAMS (Learner Approved Motorcycle Scheme) list of motorcycles of each state. Generally this means abiding by a power-to-weight ratio and a total engine size limit. Riders must hold this licence for 12 months before being permitted to upgrade to a R class motorcycle licence.
LR	Light Rigid licence	Covers a rigid vehicle with a GVM of more than 4.5 tonnes up to 8 tonnes. Any towed trailer must not weigh more than 9 tonnes GVM. This class also includes vehicles with a GVM up to 8 tonnes which carry more than 12 adults including the driver. A holder of a LR licence is also permitted to drive vehicles in class C.
MR	Medium Rigid licence	Covers a rigid vehicle with 2 axles and a GVM of more than 8 tonnes. Any towed trailer must not weigh more than 9 tonnes GVM. A holder of a MR licence is also permitted to drive vehicles in class LR and lower.
HR	Heavy Rigid licence	Covers a rigid vehicle with 3 or more axles and a GVM of more than 8 tonnes. Any towed trailer must not weigh more than 9 tonnes GVM. This class also includes articulated buses. A holder of an HR licence is also permitted to drive vehicles in class MR and lower.
HC	Heavy Combination licence	Covers heavy combination vehicles like a prime mover towing a semi-trailer, or rigid vehicles towing a trailer with a GVM of more than 9 tonnes. A holder of an HC licence is also permitted to drive vehicles in class HR and lower.
MC	Multi-Combination licence	Covers multi-combination vehicles like road trains and B-double vehicles. A holder of an MC licence is also permitted to drive vehicles in class HC and lower.

The medical standards for drivers of commercial vehicles are set by the National Transport Commission and Austroads. The driver of a vehicle carrying paying passengers (such as a school bus or tourist coach) is required to hold a driver licence depending on the size of the vehicle as well as a "Public Passenger Vehicle Driver Authority" which is issued by the state or territory issuing authority.

States and territories can issue solo car licences for automatic transmissions only. Drivers with an 'A' condition are not able to drive manual vehicles without supervision, whereas non-condition holders can operate both. In South Australia, there is no 'A' condition and licence holders can drive manual vehicles if they passed a driving test in an automatic vehicle. In the Australian Capital Territory, New South Wales and the Northern Territory, 'A' condition holders can drive manual vehicles after holding Ps for 12 months or passing a manual vehicle driving test. In Tasmania and Victoria, 'A' condition holders can drive manual vehicles after they have their unrestricted licence or passing a driving test in a manual vehicle. In Queensland and Western Australia, 'A' condition holders – including those with unrestricted licences – must take a manual vehicle driving test to remove the restriction. In all states and territories, the condition will not be applied to moving interstate and overseas drivers who don't have an equivalent licence restriction.

== Car licences – rules by jurisdiction ==
=== Graduated Licensing System comparison between states and territories ===
Jurisdiction	Licensing authority	Learner permit minimum age	Ls minimum holding period	Ls minimum supervised hours	P1 licence minimum age	P2 licence minimum age	Unrestricted licence minimum age	Unrestricted licence validity
Australian Capital Territory	Access Canberra (Road Transport Authority)	15 years, 9 months	12 months (aged under 25); 6 months (aged 25+)	100 hours (aged under 25) (Note: Includes 10 hours of night driving.); 50 hours (aged 25+) (Note: Includes 5 hours of night driving.)	17 years	18 years	20 years	10 years or 5 years (Note: Drivers aged 75+ subject to medical assessments.)
New South Wales	Transport for NSW	16 years	12 months (aged under 25)	120 hours (aged under 25) (Note: Includes 20 hours of night driving.)	17 years	18 years	20 years	10 years, 5 years, 3 years, or 1 year (Note: 10-year licences are only available to drivers aged 21 to 44; drivers aged 75+ subject to medical assessments.)
Northern Territory	Department of Infrastructure, Planning & Logistics (Motor Vehicle Registry)	16 years	6 months	None	16 years, 6 months	N/A (Note: The Northern Territory does not use two-stage provisional licences unlike other jurisdictions.)	18 years, 6 months (Note: Newly fully-licensed drivers under 25 must observe zero BAC requirements for 12 months or until they turn 25, whichever is quicker.)	10 years, 5 years, 2 years, or 1 year
Queensland	Department of Transport & Main Roads	16 years	12 months	100 hours (aged under 25)	17 years	18 years	20 years	5 years to 1 year
South Australia	Department for Infrastructure & Transport	16 years	12 months (aged under 25); 6 months (aged 25+)	75 hours (Note: Includes 15 hours of night driving.)	17 years	18 years	20 years	10 years to 1 year
Tasmania	Building Tasmania (Motor Vehicle Registry)	16 years (Note: The minimum age to complete the knowledge test for a learner permit is 15 years and 11 months, but the permit will not be issued until the person turns 16.)	12 months	80 hours	17 years	18 years	20 years	5 years to 1 year
Victoria	VicRoads	16 years	12 months (aged under 21); 6 months (aged 21–24); 3 months (aged 25+)	120 hours (aged under 21)	18 years	19 years	22 years	10 years or 3 years (Note: Drivers aged 75+ can only renew for 3-year periods.)
Western Australia	Department of Transport & Major Infrastructure	16 years	6 months	50 hours (aged under 25)	17 years	17 years, 6 months	19 years	5 years or 1 year (Note: Drivers aged 80+ subject to medical assessments.)

=== P plate rules comparison between states and territories ===
Jurisdiction	Plate style	Minimum age	Minimum period	Speed restrictions	Passenger/driving time restrictions	Demerit points	Mobile phone and device restrictions	Vehicle restrictions	Trailer restrictions
Australian Capital Territory		17 years	1 year (Note: If a person completed the driving test after turning 25, they will be issued a P2 licence for 3 years and skip P1.)	Posted speed limit	One passenger between 11 pm and 5 am who is aged between 16 and 22 years except family members (Note: Unless exempted.)	4 within 3 years	Only navigation and playing audio, if mounted or inbuilt	No restrictions	Trailer must not exceed 750 kg GVM
Australian Capital Territory		18 years	2 years	Posted speed limit	No restrictions	4 within 3 years	Only navigation and playing audio, if mounted or inbuilt	No restrictions	No restrictions
New South Wales		17 years	1 year	90 km/h (56 mph)	One passenger under 21 between 11 pm and 5 am unless exempted (Note: Only for licence holders under 25. If a P1 licence is disqualified by a court, the holder isn't allowed to drive with more than one passenger for 12 months after their licence is regained unless exempted from the condition.)	4 within 12 months	Only allowed to show digital licence when instructed by a police officer or use wallet/access functions	Power-to-weight ratio must not exceed 130 kW per tonne, no significant engine modifications, or other specifications or data suggesting that it is a high risk for novice drivers	Trailer must not exceed 250 kg when unloaded
New South Wales		18 years	2 years	100 km/h (62 mph)	No restrictions (Note: If a P2 licence is disqualified by a court, the holder isn't allowed to drive with more than one passenger for 12 months after their licence is regained unless exempted from the condition. If the driver is disqualified again while they have the condition, it will apply for another 12 months when issued a new P2 licence.)	7 within 3 years	Only allowed to show digital licence when instructed by a police officer or use wallet/access functions	Power-to-weight ratio must not exceed 130 kW per tonne, no significant engine modifications, or other specifications or data suggesting that it is a high risk for novice drivers	No restrictions
Northern Territory		16 years, 6 months	2 years (Note: If the driving test is completed after turning 25, the provisional period is 1 year.)	100 km/h (62 mph)	No restrictions	5 within 12 months or 12 within 3 years	Not allowed at all	No restrictions	No restrictions
Queensland		17 years	1 year (Note: For people who were issued their P1 licence at age 23, the P2 licence is held for 1 year. For people who were issued their P1 licence at age 24, they skip the P2 licence period. For people who were issued their P2 licence at ages 25 or older, they skip the P1 licence period and hold the P2 licence for 1 year.)	Posted speed limit	One passenger under 21 between 11 pm and 5 am except immediate family members (Note: Only for licence holders under 25.)	4 within 12 months	Not allowed at all (Note: The mobile phone restrictions don't apply to P1 licence holders aged 25 or older and their passengers. For P1 licence holders under 25, passengers' phones must not be on loudspeaker mode.)	Power-to-weight ratio must not exceed 130 kW per tonne, or engine has not been significantly modified to increase performance (Note: Unless exempted or aged 25 or older.)	No restrictions
Queensland		18 years	2 years	Posted speed limit	No restrictions	4 within 12 months	Hands-free use of mobile phones/devices allowed	Power-to-weight ratio must not exceed 130 kW per tonne, or engine has not been significantly modified to increase performance	No restrictions
South Australia		17 years	1 year	100 km/h (62 mph)	Driving banned between 12 am and 5 am; cannot carry more than one passenger aged 16 to 20 years except immediate family members (Note: Doesn't apply if the driver is being supervised by a holder of a full driver licence held for at least two years, or when exempted.)	4 within 3 years	Not allowed at all	Power-to-weight ratio must not exceed 130 kW per tonne, or no engine modifications after manufacture to increase performance	No restrictions
South Australia	N/A (Note: P2 licence holders are not required to display P plates.)	18 years	2 years	100 km/h (62 mph)	No restrictions	4 within 3 years	Hands-free use of mobile phones/devices allowed	Power-to-weight ratio must not exceed 130 kW per tonne, or no engine modifications after manufacture to increase performance	No restrictions
Tasmania		17 years	1 year	100 km/h (62 mph)	Must not carry more than one peer passenger aged 16 to less than 22 excluding spouses/domestic partners or immediate family (Note: Unless supervised by a fully-licensed driver, or when exempted.)	4 within 12 months	Not allowed at all	No restrictions	No restrictions
Tasmania		18 years	2 years (Note: For people aged 23 or older but under 25 when issued their P2 licence, the licence period is 1 year or until they turn 25, whichever is longer. For people aged 25 or older when issued their P2 licence, the licence period is 1 year.)	Posted speed limit	No restrictions	4 within 12 months	Hands-free use of mobile phones/devices allowed	No restrictions	No restrictions
Victoria		18 years	1 year (Note: If a person completed the driving test after turning 21, they will be issued a P2 licence and skip P1.)	Posted speed limit	Must not carry more than one peer passenger aged 16 to less than 22 excluding spouses/domestic partners and siblings/step-siblings	5 within 12 months or 12 within 3 years	Only navigation and playing audio, if mounted or inbuilt	Power-to-weight ratio must not exceed 130 kW per tonne, or no engine modifications after manufacture to increase performance	Not allowed (Note: Except in the course of employment as requested by an employer, or if a fully-licensed driver is supervising the probationary driver, or solely used for agriculture, horticulture, dairy, pastoral, commercial fishing or similar.)
Victoria		19 years	3 years	Posted speed limit	No restrictions	5 within 12 months or 12 within 3 years	Only navigation and playing audio, if mounted or inbuilt	Power-to-weight ratio must not exceed 130 kW per tonne, or no engine modifications after manufacture to increase performance	No restrictions
Western Australia		17 years	6 months	Posted speed limit	Driving banned between 12 am and 5 am; cannot carry more than one passenger except immediate family members (Note: Doesn't apply if the driver is being supervised by a holder of a full driver licence held for at least four years, or when exempted.)	4 (start of Ls to 12 months on Ps); 8 (start of Ls to end of Ps)	Hands-free only to make or receive a phone call, listen to music/audio, or navigate	No restrictions	No restrictions
Western Australia		17 years, 6 months	1 year, 6 months	Posted speed limit	No restrictions	4 (start of Ls to 12 months on Ps); 8 (start of Ls to end of Ps)	Hands-free only to make or receive a phone call, listen to music/audio, or navigate	No restrictions	No restrictions

=== Australian Capital Territory ===
The driving age in the Australian Capital Territory is 17 years, but after obtaining a licence, a driver is subject to restrictions during a three-year probationary period.

Learner Licence
The minimum age for obtaining a Learner Licence is 15 years and 9 months. The applicant for a Learner Licence must have completed a road safety program, called Road Ready, that is taught in many secondary schools or at a Road Ready Centre and pass a computerised road rules test.

The Road Ready course at a Road Ready Centre is a minimum of ten hours, during which an applicant learns the road rules, undergoes alcohol education and hazard perception training.

A Learner Licence is valid for two years. Learners must display black on yellow "L Plates" and drive under the supervision of a full Australian licence holder, who has held their licence for at least four years.
Provisional Licence
A learner driver can apply for a Provisional Licence if they are at least 17 years of age, and have held a Learner Licence for at least six months. They must complete a competency-based scheme with an ACT government-accredited driving instructor and during their accredited instructor driving lessons, complete a logbook containing 22 driving proficiencies. After a learner has passed all proficiencies, the logbook is turned over to RTA, which issues a provisional licence.

Alternatively, a provisional licence may be obtained by recording driving experience in the same logbook, with a supervisor who has held an open licence for 12 months for the class of vehicle used. The difference in using this method to obtain a provisional licence is that the logbook only records time spent driving, and not the learner's ability to drive. While no minimum number of hours are required, Learners are advised when obtaining their Learner's Licence, that 50 or more practical hours are recommended before attempting the practical test. Using this method, provided the driver has held their Learner's licence for at least 6 months, they may book with RTA for the practical driving test.

If the driver has obtained a licence in an automatic transmission vehicle, an "A" is placed on the licence which restricts the licence holder to driving automatic transmission vehicles for 12 months. To remove the restriction before 12 months, the provisional driver must pass the practical driving exam in a manual transmission vehicle.

A Provisional Licence is valid for three years. Provisional drivers must display red on white "P Plates" for three years unless: (a) they take an additional road safety program Road Ready Plus after six months of obtaining the Provisional Licence; or (b) they are over 26 years of age and held their licence for six months. Provisional licence holders who have taken the Road Ready Plus (RRP) course, (commonly called a "P-off" course), or are over 26 years of age also get an additional four demerit point allowance. A "PC" condition is displayed on the licence, which indicates that the provisional driver can drive with "P plates not displayed". Provisional drivers must have a zero blood-alcohol limit.

No speed restrictions are imposed on ACT learner or Provisional drivers, and they are permitted to drive the posted speed limit.
Full Licence
A driver can apply for a Full Licence after holding a Provisional Licence for three years.

=== New South Wales ===
The minimum driving age in New South Wales is 16 years. The government introduced the Graduated Licensing Scheme in 2000 and therefore learners progress from a learner licence, to a provisional P1 licence, to a provisional P2 licence and finally to a full licence over an extended period of time. After obtaining a licence, a driver continues to be subject to restrictions during a three-year probationary period.

Learner Licence
A learner licence is gained after: (a) the minimum driving age of 16 is met; (b) passing a touch-screen computer-based test Driver Knowledge Test; (c) provide identification; and (d) pass an eyesight test. Learners are permitted to drive accompanied by a supervising unrestricted licence holder. Learners are subject to numerous restrictions: (a) a maximum speed of 90 km/h; (b) a zero blood alcohol content limit; (c) cannot tow a trailer; and (d) and must conspicuously display black-on-yellow "L-plates" on the exterior of the vehicle while driving. Learners must complete at least 120 hours of driving practice including 20 hours of night driving and hold the learner licence for at least 12 months before a provisional P1 licence is issued. Since 16 December 2009, one hour with an instructor is equal to three hours of normal driving hours until a total of ten hours with an instructor. This equates to a maximum of 30 hours which can be accumulated at an advanced rate. Since 19 December 2009, learner drivers 25 years old and over are not required to complete a learner driver log book and are exempt from the twelve-month tenure.
Provisional P1 Licence
A provisional P1 licence (commonly called Ps and Reds) is gained after: (a) a minimum twelve months of holding a learner licence; (b) 120 hours (20 hours night drive between sunset and sunrise) of on-road driving experience; (c) successful completion of a computerised hazard perception test. and d) pass a driving test. The licence holder can drive unaccompanied but is limited to a maximum speed of 90 km/h, towing trailers of up to 250 kg and a zero alcohol content. Red-on-white "P-plates" must be displayed while driving. P1 drivers are limited to a total of four demerit points during the term of the licence, as compared to the thirteen-point limit on unrestricted licences. P1 drivers must hold the licence for one year before progressing to the next stage. In New South Wales the minimum age to be eligible for a provisional P1 licence is 17. As of 1 July 2007, new laws for P1 drivers have been introduced, including a limit of one passenger under the age of 21 between 11 pm and 5 am, and instant suspension for three months for any speeding offence. Furthermore, it is also now a requirement that red "P-plates" be displayed on the outside of the vehicle.
As of 20 November 2017, the Hazard Perception Test, became a requirement for learner drivers to progress to P1 Provisional licence. P1 and P2 drivers are also prohibited from driving a vehicle with a power-to-weight ratio of or greater than 130 kilowatts per tonne as of 1 August 2014, replacing the previous law of being prohibited from driving vehicles with 8 or more cylinders and being turbocharged or supercharged (diesel vehicles exempt) If a P1 or P2 licence holder is disqualified by a court for a serious driving offence, they will have a one-passenger condition imposed on them at all times while on their P1 or P2 licence. It is also worth noting that any time a P1 or P2 licence is suspended or disqualified will NOT count towards the 12 months/24 months needed for the holder to progress to a P2/full licence.
Provisional P2 Licence
A provisional P2 licence (commonly known as Ps and Greens) is gained after one year on P1 licence. The driver is restricted to a speed limit of 100 km/h, a zero alcohol limit and a maximum of seven demerit points; however, they are eligible to upgrade the class of their licence to those for heavier vehicles, to a maximum of a Heavy Combination (HC). P2 drivers must conspicuously display a green-on-white "P-plate" on the exterior of the vehicle at all times. P2 drivers must hold the licence for two years before progressing to the next stage. From 1 December 2016, P2 licence holders will no longer be permitted to use a mobile phone at all while driving or riding.
Full Licence
A full, unrestricted licence is gained after two years without suspension on the P2 licence. Unrestricted drivers licences are coloured gold.

National Heavy Vehicle Driver Licence
A Heavy Vehicle licence is issued for licences of classes HR, HC and MC. Heavy Vehicle driver licences are coloured maroon.
Photo Card

These are ID cards issued for non-drivers by the Roads and Maritime Services.

=== Northern Territory ===
The learner licence may be obtained at age 16. Learner drivers may not use a mobile phone and must be supervised by a full licence holder and may not drive faster than 80 km/h. After holding the learner licence for six months a provisional licence may be obtained. Once the provisional licence is obtained, it must be held for a minimum of 2 years before obtaining the full Northern Territory licence.

Provisional Licence
The provisional licence period is a minimum of two years.

Provisional drivers need to comply with all road rules and traffic laws and other restrictions: eg., the speed limit is 100 km/h, The Blood Alcohol Concentration (BAC) must be zero, provisional drivers are not permitted to use a mobile phone in any form whilst driving, including hands-free devices and texting. Accumulating five or more demerit points within a 12-month period will trigger action against a provisional driver.

Provisional drivers must display approved P-plates that are clearly visible to the front and rear of the vehicle and which do not obstruct the driver's vision. P-plates must have the letter 'P' in red on a white background. The plate must be a minimum of 150mm wide and 150mm tall. P-plates must not be displayed when the person driving the vehicle is not a provisional driver.

Source: Northern Territory Department of Transport

=== Queensland ===
Learner Licence
Persons may apply for their Learner Licence at 16 years of age, passing a written Road Rules Test. Learners under 25 must hold a licence for at least one year and log a total of 100hrs on-road driving experience (including 10hrs night driving) in the issued logbook. However, a logbook exemption can be applied for, meaning the learner will not need to submit a logbook with 100 hours of driving, but will need to hold a Learner Licence for a minimum of 2 years before going for the provisional licence. Learners over 25 years of age are not required to complete a log book of 100 logged driving hours; however, they may voluntarily do so. Learners must display yellow L-plates and are not speed restricted by the licence. Learners must be accompanied by an open licence holder who has held the relevant class open licence for at least 1 year. The drinking level must be 0.00 for a learner and the instructor must be under 0.05 BAC.
Provisional licence 1
P1 is a transitional licence for applicants 25 years old or younger. Applicants must be at least 17 years of age, held a Learner Licence for a minimum of twelve months, recorded a minimum of 100 hours driving experience in the learner logbook with a supervisor who has held an open licence for twelve months for the class of vehicle used or an accredited driving instructor, and has passed a practical driving test. P1 drivers must at all times display red P-plates. P1 licence holders may upgrade to P2 licences after holding their P1 licences for one year and passing the hazard perception test. There are restrictions to the power of the vehicles and the number of passengers allowed in relation to P1 drivers. Drivers over 25 years of age who successfully pass their practical driving test are able to skip the P1 licence stage and progress directly to the P2 licence stage.
Provisional licence 2
If not upgraded from P1, applicants must have held a Learner Licence for a minimum of twelve months. P2 drivers must display green P-plates. P2 licence holders may upgrade to an open licence after holding their P2 licence for two years (one year for P2 licence holders over 25 years of age). As with P1 licences, there are restrictions to power and passengers but they are less restrictive than P1 licences.
Driver Licence
The Queensland Government is replacing the current laminate Driver Licence & Heavy Vehicle Driver Licence with a more secure, durable and reliable licence. All licensing and personal information that is currently on the face of the laminated licence will remain on the face of the new card, and the address on the back. From 2005, Queensland licences have been called a "Driver Licence" (as opposed to the traditional "Driver's Licence" or the variant "Driving Licence"), and no longer carry information about the holder's organ donor status. The Australian Organ Donor Register is now used for national registration of tissue donation status. Queensland drivers who are over the age of 75, and those with a reportable medical condition are required to drive with a completed, current medical certificate. These drivers must present this medical certificate to police while driving. While they are legally required to keep a current medical certificate with them while driving, they are able to renew their driver license for a period that goes beyond their current medical certificate expiry date. For more information on driver's licences in Queensland, see Department of Transport and Main Roads and click on Licensing.
Work Licence
A Queensland Driver charged with a drink driving offence may apply for a work licence that if granted by the Magistrates Court would entitle the driver to drive for work purposes whilst their licence is suspended.
UD Class Licence
Queensland had a special class UD licence which allows operation of heavy agricultural or purpose-built vehicles without an MC or HC licence. No new licences of this type will be issued after 1 January 2014, but existing licences remain valid.

=== South Australia ===
Learner's Permit
A person who is at least 16 may apply for a Learner's Permit (commonly referred to as Ls) in South Australia. Applicants must pass a theory test to obtain a driving permit. A learner driver must always be accompanied by a Qualified Supervising Driver (that does not hold either a provisional or a probationary licence). Learners must display yellow L-plates, and may not have a blood alcohol content greater than zero and must not accumulate more than four demerit points. Learner drivers are allowed to travel at a maximum speed of 100 km/h, even where the posted speed limit is higher. Learner drivers are permitted to tow a single trailer.
Provisional Licence

To get a Provisional Licence (also called a probationary licence and commonly referred to as Ps), you must have held a learner's permit for at least 12 months, be at least 17 years of age or have an equivalent interstate or overseas driver's licence and be at least 17. If you had a learner's permit, you must also have a log book showing you have had at least 75 hours of driving experience (including a minimum of 15 hours of night-time driving), all of which must have been signed by the Qualified Supervising Driver. All applicants must pass a vehicle on-road driving test (VORT) or be signed off on several points by a driving instructor in a competency-based training course. Drivers are then issued with a P1 licence. P-platers must drive at a maximum speed limit of 100 km/h (even where the posted speed limit is higher), no alcohol or party drugs can be in the system, and the driver cannot accrue more than 4 demerit points. They must also display red P plates (shown on left).

Drivers who obtain a P1 provisional licence on or after 4 September 2010 must not drive a high-powered vehicle if they are under the age of 25. High powered includes vehicles with engines of eight or more cylinders, vehicles with turbocharged or supercharged engines (excluding diesel powered vehicles), vehicles that have been modified to increase engine performance, nominated high-performance vehicles, and vehicles that are over a certain power-to-weight ratio. High-powered vehicle restrictions do not apply to drivers over 25 years of age. P plates of any kind are not displayed when on the P2 licence, and it is illegal to display P2 plates from other states.

A driver must have held a provisional licence (combined P1s and P2s) for at least 3 years (one year on P1 and 2 years on P2) before becoming a fully licensed driver. Fully licensed drivers have their restrictions on alcohol relaxed to 0.05 per cent blood alcohol concentration and may drive at the full speed limit (which is 110 km/h on many country roads).

Note: Drivers on their provisional or learners licence follow their own state's imposed limits while driving in other states. While driving on a SA licence in states with a provisional and learner licence imposed maximum speed limit less than 100 km/h, drivers are able to still drive at 100 km/h, while local P and L platers are subject to their own state's restrictions, such as 90 km/h in New South Wales. This means that South Australian provisional or learner drivers may be pulled over more frequently than local drivers.

=== Tasmania ===
Learner Licence
A learner licence for cars may be obtained after reaching age 16. A person holding a learner licence may not exceed 90 km/h in speed or tow a trailer or boat, and may only drive with a BAC of zero. L plates must be displayed, and a supervisory driver with a full licence must sit in the front passenger seat. The supervisory driver must not have any periods of suspension or disqualification within the last two years. As of April 2009, there are separate L1 and L2 stages. After 3 months a Learner can go for a practical driving test, this test proves in the driver can drive safely. This test can be undertaken in an automatic or manual vehicle, if the L2's test was undertaken in an automatic vehicle the learner can still go for their manual licence when the undertake the P's test. (there is no plate change it still remains the yellow L plate) Once a Learner is on their L2's they begin logging their driving hours, a learner must complete 80 hours of driving and must be of the age of 17 before they can take the practical driving test. This test contains several sections including the "I left something behind" task.
As of 2 March 2015; L2 drivers have new speed restrictions in which they can drive at 90 km/h in a 90 or 100 zone and at 100 km/h in a 110 zone.
P1
A P1 licence may be issued after reaching age 17, logging 50 practice hours, holding an L2 licence for nine months, and passing a practical driving test. A P1 licence is issued for one year. P1 drivers must remain under 100 km/h, have a zero BAC while driving, and display P plates. Provisional drivers may tow other vehicles. As of 2 March 2015; P1 drivers have new speed restrictions in which they can drive at 90km/h in a 90 or 100 zone and at 100 km/h in a 110 zone. After 12 months, the licence converts to a P2 licence. P2 are still limited to driving at most 100km/h provided they do not exceed the speed limit, and do not have to display P plates. They must have a BAC limit of zero to drive and the licence will be suspended if 4 demerit points are accumulated, contrasted with 12 for full licence holders. Drivers must hold the P2 licence for between 12 months and two years, depending on their age, to be issued a full licence.

Note: there are no vehicle restrictions in Tasmania.

=== Victoria ===
The minimum driving age in Victoria is 18 years. A learner can drive at the age of 16 under the supervision of a fully licensed driver since 1966. After obtaining a licence, a driver continues to be subject to restrictions during a 4-year probationary period.

Learner's Permit
A Learner's Permit may be obtained by a person over 16 years. The applicant must pass a computerised knowledge test and an eyesight test. Learner drivers must not consume any alcohol before driving (i.e. the Blood alcohol content (BAC) must be zero), and must be accompanied by a driver who holds a full driver licence and has a BAC below 0.05%. A Victorian learner's permit is valid for 10 years from date of issue.

'L' plates must be displayed while driving, and must not tow a trailer. There are no special speed or vehicle restrictions.

They are allowed to use securely mounted devices only for navigation and playing audio if they are set up before the trip. They must not touch any portable or mounted devices during a drive, and for portable devices they are also not allowed to operate, look at or touch it with any body parts. For inbuilt devices, they are allowed to briefly touch it to adjust navigation settings, climate controls and audio functions while driving.

Learner permits, P1 and P2 probationary licences may incur a maximum of 5 demerit points in any 12 month period, and 12 points in any 3 year period.

P1 (Red) probationary licence
A P1 Probationary Driver Licence holder must be over 18 years of age and pass a computerised Hazard Perception Test, a practical driving test and an eyesight test. P1 drivers must display white-on-red 'P-plates'.

An applicant for a Driver Licence must have held a Learner's Permit for at least 12 months if the applicant is under 21 years at the time of applying; 6 months if the applicant is between 21 and 24 years; and 3 months for applicants aged over 25 years. If a driver obtained their Learner's Permit after 1 July 2007, and are under 21 years of age, they must have logged 120 hours of practice, including 20 hours at night.

Probationary drivers must drive with a zero BAC, and are not permitted to drive "high-powered vehicles" (vehicles with a power-to-weight ratio greater than 130 kW/tonne), unless exempted. If the driver was tested in an automatic vehicle, the driver will have an "A" condition applied to their licence and are not permitted to drive a manual transmission vehicle during the probationary period unless supervised by fully licensed driver who doesn't have any conditions preventing them from driving manual. You must also display "driver under instruction" plates in addition to the P Plate. The "A" condition can be lifted anytime during the probationary period by taking a practical drive test in a manual transmission vehicle.

There are no speed restrictions, however trailers may not be towed except for work purposes. P1 drivers have a peer passenger restriction which sees P1 drivers only able to carry no more than one passenger aged between 16–22 years old (excluding family members; exemptions may also be allowed by VicRoads for other reasons) at any time unless a fully licensed driver is a passenger. They must not operate, look at, or touch any portable devices, unless if it is mounted where they can only be used for navigation and playing audio provided that it is set up before the trip. During a drive, they are not allowed to touch the mounted device, while for inbuilt devices it is allowed to adjust navigation settings, climate controls and playing audio functions briefly.

On 1 July 2008, what is considered a high-powered vehicle was redefined. P plate drivers were no longer allowed to drive cars with engines larger than a V6, cars that have a turbo or supercharger (unless it is a diesel). A shortlist was produced of cars that comply with these restrictions but are still considered powerful and therefore banned. The list includes BMW M3 and Porsche 911. There have been many complaints about this system as several slower cars have been banned, such as the Peugeot 308, but faster cars such as VW Golf R32 and BMW 130i were still permitted.

On 1 July 2014, the rules were again modified, to distinguish between vehicles manufactured before 1 January 2010, and those manufactured after. Probationary drivers are now permitted to drive any vehicle manufactured after 1 January 2010 that does not have a power-to-mass ratio of greater than 130 kilowatts per tonne, and does not have a modified engine for increased performance. Vehicles manufactured before 1 January 2010 remain subject to previous restrictions, which include a restriction on engines larger than a V6, and cars that have a turbocharger or supercharger.

After 1 July 2008, those aged over 21 years when applying for a licence qualify as P2 drivers after passing the computerised Hazard Perception Test and a practical driving test, as well as an eyesight test.

On 31 March 2023, new road rules are introduced where P platers are now allowed to use mobile phones or other portable devices for navigation and playing audio only if they are mounted and set up before the trip. They must not touch any portable or mounted devices during a drive, and for portable devices they are also not allowed to operate (both physical and voice control), look at or even touch it with any body parts (except in pockets or holding porches attached to clothes). For inbuilt devices, they are allowed to briefly touch it to adjust navigation settings, climate controls and playing audio functions while driving.
P2 (Green) Probationary Licence
The P2 Probationary Driver Licence came into effect from 1 July 2008. For probationary drivers obtaining a P1 Probationary Licence after that date, their licence status will progress to a P2 Licence automatically provided they have had a good driving record for at least 12 months while holding the P1 Licence. P2 Drivers still have to adhere to the probationary prohibited vehicle requirements (unless exempted) and .00 BAC as P1 drivers do however P2 Drivers may tow a trailer, and do not have any restrictions on the number of passengers.
As of 31 March 2023, P2 drivers like P1 drivers can only use securely mounted portable devices while driving, provided that they are set up before the trip and only playing audio or navigation function is used. They must display the white-on-green 'P-plates', rather than the red. If a person is over 21 when licensed they go straight onto the P2 licence for three years. P2 licences last for 3 years, making the minimum age of receiving a full licence 22 years, up from 21 years for drivers who obtained their Probationary Licence before 1 July 2008. The minimum age for obtaining a P2 Licence is 19 years. All drivers who obtained their Probationary Licence before 1 July 2008 qualify as P2 drivers and must display the green 'P' plates.
Driver Licence
A full Driver Licence is obtained after the probationary period. For drivers who obtained their Probationary Driver Licence after 1 July 2008, the minimum age at which they can obtain their full Driver Licence is 22, unless they already have an Interstate or New Zealand Probationary licence, and move to Victoria, in which case they can be 21. This is an irregularity that can allow Interstate and New Zealand drivers to obtain their full licence one year ahead of residential Victorians. There are few restrictions on fully licensed drivers, other than not being able to drive while holding a mobile phone, and the requirement to have a BAC under 0.05%. Full licences are valid for ten years, but can be made available for three years if requested. Full driver licences may incur a maximum of 12 demerit points in any 3 year period.

=== Western Australia ===
The driving age in Western Australia is 17 years. A learner can drive at the age of 16 under the supervision of a fully licensed driver. After obtaining a licence, a driver continues to be subject to restrictions during a 2-year probationary period.

Learner's permit
A Learner's Permit to drive a car in Western Australia can be gained by anyone aged 16 or over after successfully passing a computer-based driving theory test and an eyesight test. Drivers with Learner's Permits may drive only whilst accompanied by either a qualified driving instructor or a person who has held a valid licence of the same type as the permit for 4 years. Learner drivers must display black-on-yellow "L" plates, and must not drive with a blood alcohol content exceeding 0.00%. Learner's Permits expire after three years. After a recent bill passed through parliament, Phase 1 drivers are now permitted to drive on Perth freeways as well as other roads outside the boundaries of Kings Park.
Hazard Perception Test
Holders of a Learners Permit for 6 months or more (and are aged 16 years and 6 months or older) are permitted to undergo the computerised "Hazard Perception Test (HPT)". After passing the HPT, drivers may take their practical driving assessment once aged 17.
Provisional licence
A Provisional Licence is awarded when learner drivers aged 17 years or over complete 50 hours of driving experience in their log book and pass a practical driving test accompanied by an examiner employed by the government. Upon passing, drivers are to be on a provisional licence for 2 years. Drivers with provisional licences must display white-on-red 'P' plates whenever they drive within the first 6 months, can drive unaccompanied but cannot drive with a blood alcohol content over 0.00%. They are not allowed to drive between 12 am – 5 am unless driving to and from place of work or study.
For the last 18 months, provisionally licensed drivers must display white-on-green 'P' plates and cannot drive with a blood alcohol content over 0.00%.
Changes to the Learners Permit process
From 9 October 2017, the Department of Transport introduced a change to the process of obtaining a drivers licence. The new process requires applicants to complete the Hazard Perception Test before the Practical Driving Assessment. Applicants still have to be at least 16 years of age when acquiring a Learner's Permit, but are now required to be at least 16 years and 6 months of age for the Hazard Perception Test and at least 17 years of age for the Practical Driving Assessment. The previous process allowed applicants to complete the Practical Driving Assessment at 16 years and 6 months of age, followed by the computerised Hazard Perception Test at 17 years. The minimum age to hold a Provisional Licence is still 17 years.

Note: there are no vehicle restrictions in Western Australia.

==== Graduated demerit points ====
As of 1 December 2010, the Western Australian Government introduced a new Graduated Demerit Point system for Novice Drivers (which includes L- and P-plate drivers). Under this system, a driver may accrue less than 4 demerit points within the first year of their provisional licence, and less than 8 points within the second year, before losing their licence. These limits include demerit points accrued before these 1- and 2-year periods.

==== Full driver's licence ====
The provisional licence automatically converts into a full driver's licence after the 2-year probationary period. Drivers with full driver's licences must drive with a blood alcohol content less than 0.05%, may accrue less than 12 demerit points before being disqualified, and may drive at up to 110 km/h (the maximum speed limit in the state). 'P' plate drivers may also drive up to 110 km /h, where permitted by the state.

WA has two classes of drivers licence: C which enables one to drive any vehicle weighing less than 4.5 tonnes C-A which enables one to drive any vehicle fitted with an automatic transmission and weighing less than 4.5 tonnes. Refer

==== Double or nothing ====
Drivers who have accrued 12 or more demerit points can choose to continue driving on a 12-month Good Behaviour Period. If more than two demerit points are accrued during the 12-month period (even on different fines), the licence is lost for twice the original disqualification period; usually 6 months (3 months × 2).

== Identification ==
Australia does not have a national identity card, and driver's licences are commonly used as a means of photo identification. Photo cards are also available, especially for non-drivers. Beside identification, these may be used as proof of age for entry to venues which have age restrictions, such as premises where alcohol is sold.

Licences and photo cards are hologrammed, and contain a photograph, signature, the holder's address, and date of birth.

Electronic online identification can be (partly) established using a driver's licence for online applications for some services such as SIM card activation, and opening bank accounts.

The Australian Attorney-General's Department provides a document verification service that allows for validation of some licences.

Many issuing authorities such as NSW allow for an online check of the validity of a driver's licence.

== Digital driver licences ==
=== South Australia ===
South Australia became the first state to officially roll out digital driver's licences via its mySA GOV smartphone app in October 2017. The app allows licences to show dynamic content including demerit points, expiry statuses and licence conditions.

=== New South Wales ===
The Digital Driver Licence was first trialled in Sydney's Eastern Suburbs, Dubbo and Albury before being rolled out statewide in October 2019. Under the system, Digital Driver Licences are available through the Service NSW app. The app allows licences to show dynamic content including demerit points, expiry date, suspension details and licence conditions. Drivers will continue to receive a physical licence card for backup purposes in addition to interstate and overseas usage.

=== Queensland ===
In 2020, Queensland trialled digital licences in the Fraser Coast Region. During the Fraser Coast test, users reported a 94 per cent satisfaction rating. The Queensland Government announced plans to host another trial in Townsville in 2022 and was rolled out statewide from 1 November 2023.

=== Victoria ===
Following a successful trial in Ballarat, digital driver licences are available in the myVicRoads and the Service Victoria apps to all Victorian full licence holders from 13 May 2024. The digital licence was made available to learner drivers and P-platers from 19 November 2024.

== Overseas licences ==
With the exception of the Northern Territory and Victoria, visitors with a temporary visa (other than a permanent visa) from other countries are conditionally permitted to drive with their current overseas drivers licence for the length of their stay. Conditions vary for every state and territory. Generally, drivers must carry their overseas licence with them. A certified translation or International Driving Permit is only required if the licence is not in English, and the original licence must be carried regardless. In NSW, once a driver becomes a permanent resident a local licence should be obtained generally within three months. In Victoria, a resident who is planning on staying for more than 6 months is not permitted to drive with an overseas licence for more than six months (calculated using the visa grant or Australia entry date, whichever is later).

== Interstate travel ==
Interstate visitors are permitted to travel on their current Australian or New Zealand licence. They must obey the local road rules of that state. The differences in state laws have generated much confusion to visiting drivers, with many pushing for uniform federal road rules.

Interstate visitors on their L or P plates must follow the licence conditions set of their home state rather than conditions placed upon licence-holders of the state which they are visiting i.e., a driver holding an SA provisional licence who is visiting New South Wales is able to legally drive at 100 km/h, whereas a NSW P1 driver is restricted to 90 km/h.

Drivers who move interstate must apply for a new driver's licence within three to six months of moving depending on the state they are moving to. Unless a driving test is required, there is no charge for a conversion from a current interstate licence. Usually, licences are converted in the same day, to the same or equivalent class, or, in the case of the conversion of a non-GLS licence to a GLS system, a P1 or P2 licence is issued, depending on the length of time that the holder of the licence has been driving. The licence may need to be confirmed by obtaining a letter from the interstate licence issuing authority (on their letterhead) confirming the licence details (including first issue date) and status.

Drivers moving states may be eligible to upgrade their licence class, due to the varying age rules that apply in each state. For example, a Victorian learner driver who moves to NSW may be eligible to sit the driving test to obtain a P1 licence. However, drivers who are under 18 will not be able to obtain the same licence class in Victoria, where one must be at least 18 to do so. Another example is a Victorian over 25 moving to Tasmania, SA, QLD or WA will be able to obtain a full licence after having held their Ps for 12 months in Victoria despite the fact that the probationary period for over-21-year-olds in Victoria is 3 years.

== Interstate commercial driving jobs ==
Most states do not allow a person to have an interstate commercial driving job if the person does not "reside" in that state. For example, a person with a Queensland Driver's Licence and Driver's Authority (a variation of the wording Driver's Accreditation) cannot obtain a commercial driving job in South Australia unless that person registers a "residential" address in South Australia, even though they may not live there, and swap over the Driver's Licence and obtain a new Driver's Accreditation.

== Suspension or cancellation of licence ==
Each state has a demerit points system that leads to the suspension of a driver's licence if the demerit point threshold is reached. The rules vary, but road authorities share information about interstate offenses.

In all states, drivers holding a full, unrestricted licence will be disqualified from driving after accumulating 12 demerit points or more within a three-year period, except in New South Wales, where drivers are allowed 13 points in a three-year period. Those who can prove they are professional drivers are allowed an additional point. The minimum suspension period is three months, plus one further month for every extra four demerit points beyond the licence's limit, with a cap in most states of five months (for 8 points or more over the suspension trigger; e.g. 20 points or more on a full licence). An alternative to initially accepting the suspension, a driver can apply for a "good behavior" period of 12 months. In most states, drivers under a good behavior period who accumulate two further points (one point in Victoria) have their licence suspended for double the original period.

Most states also provide for immediate suspension of a licence, instead of or in addition to demerit points, in certain extreme circumstances. These generally include offences for driving under the influence of alcohol or other drugs, or for greatly excessive speed.

In some circumstances, driver's licences can be cancelled, either immediately or by court order, such as for anti-social driving activity, popularly known as hooning.

Drivers on their learner's or provisional licence who accrue more than 4 demerit points can sometimes enter a "good behavior" system, in which they are given a licence with 1 maximum demerit point for a certain amount of time.

== See also ==
- Australian state and territory issued identity photo cards
