= Identity documents of Australia =

Australia does not have a national identity card. Various Identity documents of Australia may be used or required to prove a person's identity instead of a national identity card, whether for government or commercial purposes such as:

- International and domestic travel
- Starting a job with a new employer
- Obtaining social welfare
- Opening bank accounts
- Asserting identity with government agencies or companies
- General purpose validation of identity when picking up goods etc.
- At the request of police or security officers for legally valid purposes.
- Asserting that one is a responsible adult (generally 18 years or over) to:
  - Access age restricted venues such as licensed premises, casinos, nightclubs or other gaming venues.
  - Purchase of alcohol, tobacco, knives or aerosol based spray paint.

== Overview ==
Currently, driver licences, issued by the state and territory authorities, are the most widely used personal identification documents. Driver licences list a person's full name, date of birth, current address and contains a photograph. They can commonly be used for personal identification for various purposes such as obtaining various government permits and documentation (for example, passport or tax file number) as well as for opening bank accounts or applying for credit cards. (See also 100 point check.)

For people who do not drive, the road authorities of the states and territories will issue a "photo card", also called "proof of age card", to people who do not have a driver's licence.

Other identity documents sometimes used include a passport, an official birth certificate, an official marriage certificate, cards issued by government agencies (typically Medicare card), some cards issued by commercial organisations (e.g., a debit or credit card), and utility accounts. Often, some combination of identity documents is required, such as an identity document linking a name, photograph and signature (typically photo-ID in the form of a driver licence or passport), evidence of operating in the community, and evidence of a current residential address.

Proof of citizenship or right to work status on a visa may be required in some cases, such as when applying for a job. In these cases separate photo identity may also be required.

== Main Types ==
There is no consistent standard for verifying identity. For most purposes, an Australian drivers licence or Australian photo card will suffice; however, for more sophisticated transactions (e.g. applying for a passport or opening a bank account), each institution tends to have its own rules.

Some examples of identity documents are:

=== Primary Identification Documents ===
The highest category of identity documents that often act as primary validation of identity include:

- Australian passport
- Australian citizenship certificate
- Overseas passport
- Australian birth certificate
- Australia drivers licence
- Overseas drivers licence
- Australian Document of Identity
- Australian Certificate of Identity
- Australian Convention Travel Document
- ImmiCard
- Australian state and territory issued identity photo cards
- Australia Post Keypass identity card (Regional, limited recognition)
- Australia Post Digital iD (Regional, limited recognition)

=== Secondary Identification Documents ===
Other documents generally used to enhance an identity check along with primary documents, or used for specific purposes include:

- Medicare card
- Federal Concession cards
- Australian Seniors Card
- Australian Marriage Certificate (for change of name)
- Australian Change of Name Certificate (for change of name)
- Australian Recognised Details or Identity Acknowledgment Certificate (for change of sex indicator)
- Utility bill – a Telephone, Water, Electricity or Gas bill
- Travel concession card issued by State transport authorities
- Rates notice – a notice of rates issued by an Australian municipal council
- An Australian education institution identification card
- A letter of enrolment from an Australian school or education institution
- An Australian bank issued plastic debit or credit card
- An Australian bank statement
- Motor vehicle registration papers issued in Australia
- Home insurance papers
- Student cards issued by schools or higher education institutions

Preference is given to Identity documents showing full name, address and a photo, and documents issued by Australian institutions.

For proof of identity purposes, some of the documents are listed as primary and others secondary. Generally at least one primary and one secondary document is required to prove identity at the time of origination of a new facility or product, along with documents that have a photo and address. Requirements vary from institution to institution, and from time to time. The 100 point check, that gives higher points for photo-ID government documents, and lower points for less reliable identity documents, remains a popular system, but is not ubiquitous.

== Photo identity ==
Primary means of acceptable photo identification includes:

- Australian passport or foreign passport
- Australian state and territory issued identity photo cards
- Australian driving licence
- Australia Post Keypass identity card
- Australia Post Digital iD

For visitors to Australia:

- Foreign driving licence – if a photo is present
- Foreign national identity – if a photo is present

Some institutions may accept for general purposes other forms of photo identity, such as student identity cards.

== Verification ==
There are cases where it is against the law to use false or fake identity documents. Documents used for identity have security features – training and experience is necessary to properly identify genuine documents from counterfeits especially as the security features of many documents are not published. Increasingly online facilities are available for document verification services and establishing Digital identity in Australia:

- The Australian Government Department of Home Affairs provides a document verification service that allows for validation of some licences and certificates.
- The Australian Government Department of Home Affairs also provides a bio-metric face verification service
- The Department of Home Affairs offers a Visa Entitlement Verification Online (VEVO) service to confirm work conditions and validity of visas.
- Some States and territories allow for drivers licences, photo cards and certificates to be validated online e.g. NSW and Victoria.
- Private companies offer aggregated online identity checking services e.g. Digital iD by Australia Post, VIX Verify and Equifax

For organisations choosing to out-source identity verification, over-the-counter services are available from some providers, such as:

- Australia Post Verification of Identity (VOI) service.
- Equifax ZipID
- ID Secure

== Issues ==
While it is rare for people to be stopped on the street and asked for identity documents, it was raised in NSW parliament that there are 47 (possibly more) theoretical instances where identity particulars and/or documents need to be supplied to authorities by state law alone. In some cases head covering may need to be removed. In 2016, proposed laws to force bicycle riders in NSW to carry identity were abandoned after public resistance. Drivers must carry a drivers licence, however for most people, while they can be asked for identity (Name and address etc.), failure not to show should generally not result in any breach of law, however they may be refused entry, refused passage, or arrested if there is an associated suspected breach of law (e.g. supplying false details to Police).

There have been two proposals to introduce ID cards for tax and social security access in Australia: The Australia Card in 1985 by the Hawke Labor Government and the Health and Social Services Access Card in 2006 by the Howard Liberal Government. Although neither card would have been an official compulsory ID card, they were both criticised as leading to de facto ID cards. Ultimately, both proposals failed. On 22 October 2017, Pauline Hanson was reported requesting a new identity card to stop Welfare fraud. It has been suggested that the Australia Card has been delivered gradually over time utilising cooperation of various state and federal government agencies and documents.

Queensland alcohol laws in force since 2017 require pubs and bars that trade past midnight to scan ID documents against a database of people who should be denied alcohol, for which foreign passports and driver licences are not valid.

== See also ==
- Digital identity in Australia
- Identity documents
