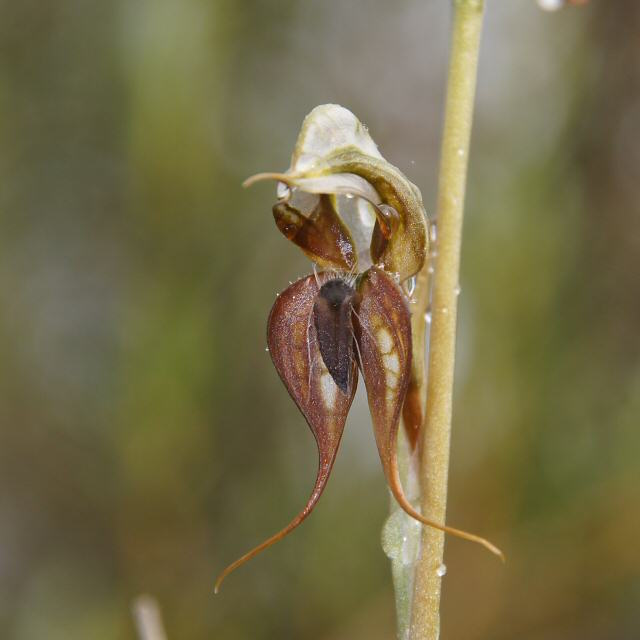
- Pterostylis lingua growing near Werrimull

Scientific classification
- Kingdom: Plantae
- Clade: Tracheophytes
- Clade: Angiosperms
- Clade: Monocots
- Order: Asparagales
- Family: Orchidaceae
- Subfamily: Orchidoideae
- Tribe: Cranichideae
- Genus: Pterostylis
- Species: P. lingua

Binomial name
- Pterostylis lingua M.A.Clem.

Synonyms
- Oligochaetochilus linguus (M.A.Clem.) Szlach.

= Pterostylis lingua =

Large-lipped rustyhood

Species of orchid

Pterostylis lingua, commonly known as the large-lipped rustyhood, is a plant in the orchid family Orchidaceae and is endemic to south-eastern Australia. It has a rosette of leaves and up to ten dark reddish-brown flowers with translucent "windows" and a blackish, insect-like labellum.

== Description ==
Pterostylis lingua, is a terrestrial, perennial, deciduous, herb with an underground tuber. It has a rosette of between three and twelve elliptic leaves at the base of the flowering spike, each leaf 10–35 mm (0.4–1 in) long and 8–12 mm (0.3–0.5 in) wide. Up to ten dark reddish-brown flowers with translucent windows and 25–32 mm (0.98–1.3 in) long, 8–11 mm (0.3–0.4 in) wide are borne on a flowering spike 150–350 mm (6–10 in) tall. Four to seven stem leaves are wrapped around the flowering spike. The dorsal sepal and petals form a hood or "galea" over the column with the dorsal sepal having an upturned point 5–8 mm (0.2–0.3 in) long. The lateral sepals turn downwards, wider than the galea and suddenly taper to tips 10–12 mm (0.4–0.5 in) long which spread apart from each other. The labellum is blackish-brown, thin and insect-like, 6–7 mm (0.2–0.3 in) long and about 3 mm (0.1 in) wide. The thickened "head" end has many short hairs and the "body" has seven to ten longer hairs on each side. Flowering occurs from September to October.

== Taxonomy and naming ==
Pterostylis lingua was first formally described in 1989 by Mark Clements from a specimen collected in the Cocoparra National Park and the description was published in Australian Orchid Research. The specific epithet (lingua) is a Latin word meaning "tongue".

== Distribution and habitat ==
The large-lipped rustyhood grows in drier forest and woodland and is locally common between Cootamundra and Bourke New South Wales. In South Australia it only occurs in the Eastern Bioregion and in Victoria, only in the far north-western corner of that state.

== Conservation ==
Only about 1500 plants of Pterostylis lingua are known in Victoria, where the species is classed as "endangered" and it is also considered to be "endangered" in South Australia.
