= Revenue protection inspector =

Staff who patrol for ticket of passengers

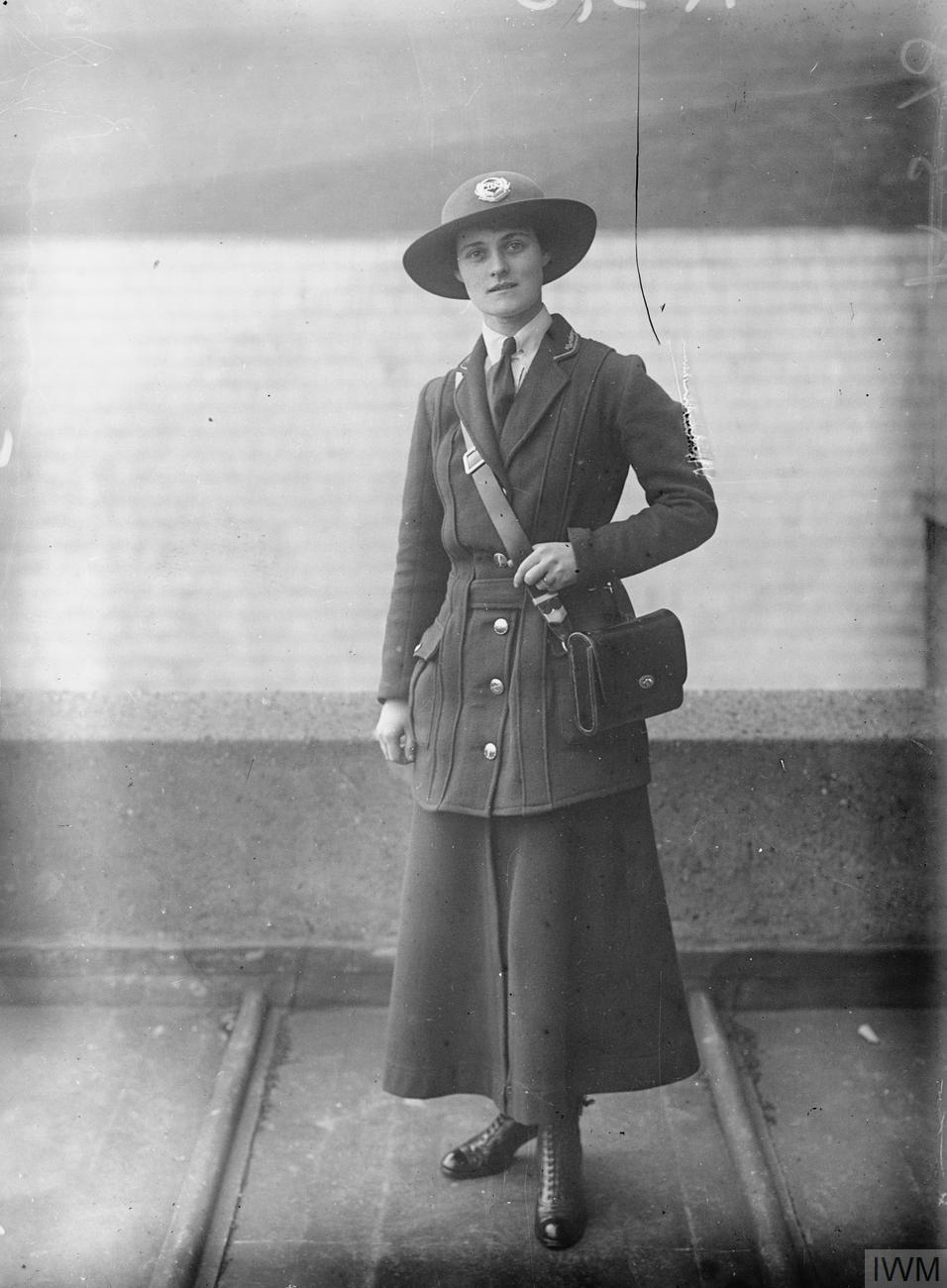
A ticket inspector (1917)

Revenue protection inspector (RPI) or revenue protection officer (RPO) is the job title given to staff who patrol different forms of public transport issuing penalty fares to passengers who travel without a valid ticket or without the correct ticket (e.g. travelling where the ticket is not valid or a commuter using a concession ticket without possessing appropriate evidence of entitlement to concession). Bus inspectors also check whether the bus is running to time and whether the driver/conductor is collecting fares correctly, and attempt to maintain headways. In addition to this, their job also involves ensuring that passengers behave well (including no vandalism, no entering restricted vehicle areas, not placing feet on seats etc).

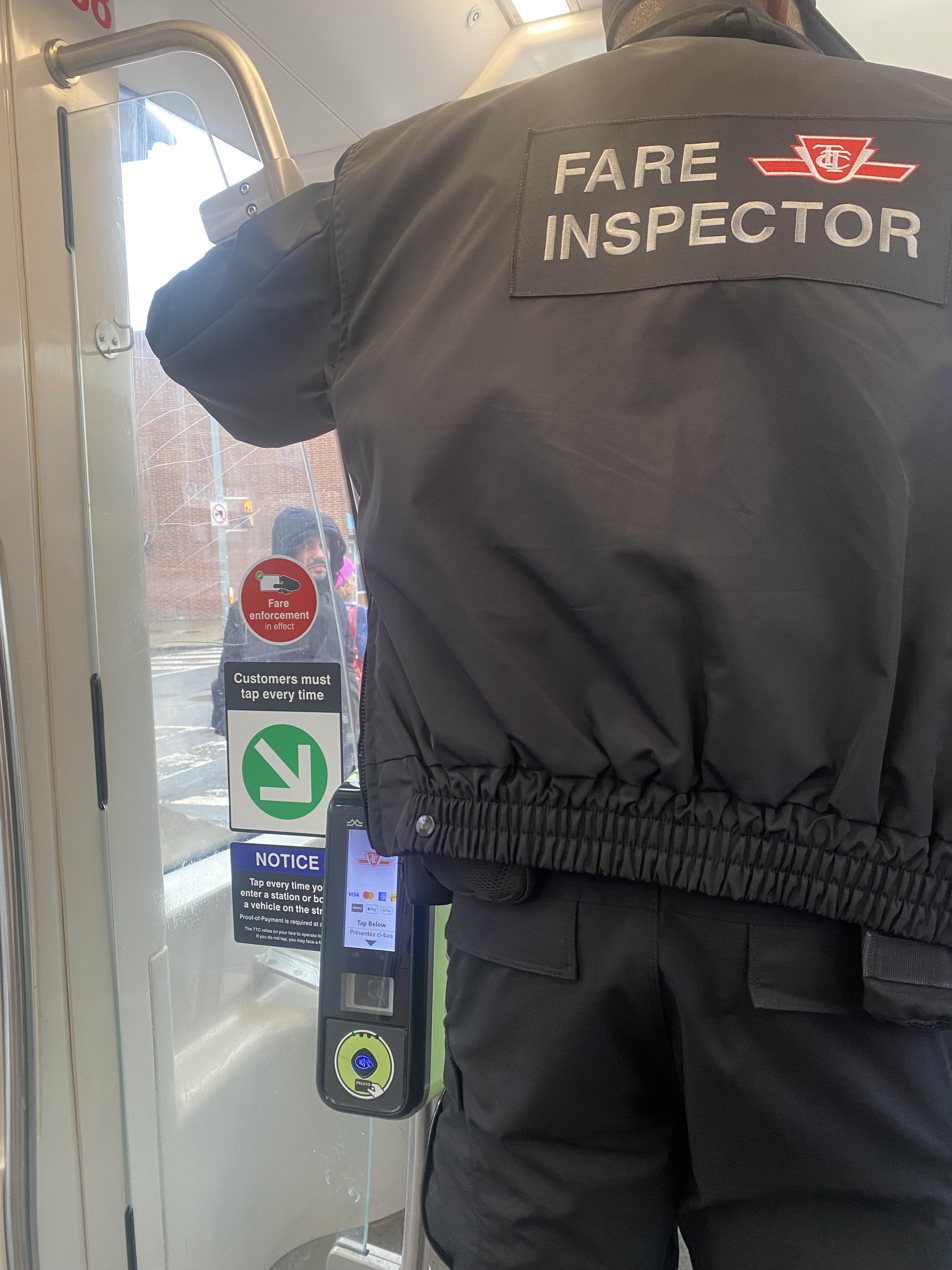
Uniformed fare inspector of the Toronto Transit Commission on a streetcar in Toronto, Canada

These titles are principally used in the United Kingdom and Australia. In the United States, and Canada, fare inspectors are transit police officers who audit transit passengers for proper payment of fare; in addition in some cases, regular police officers are authorized to conduct fare inspections on some systems.

== United Kingdom ==
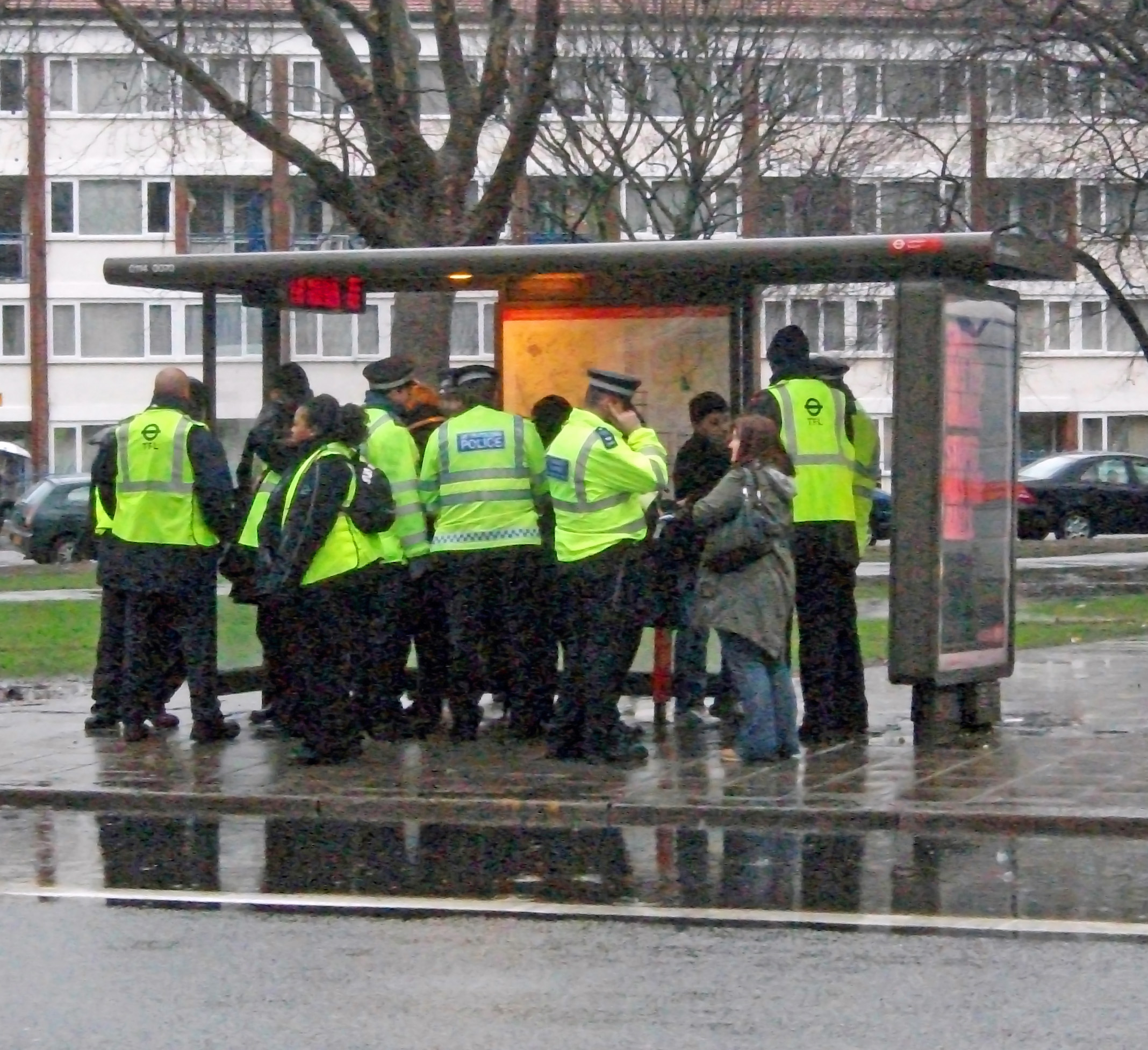
Revenue control inspectors and police officers at a bus stop in London

Revenue inspectors and officers mostly work at railway stations checking passengers' tickets as they board and alight trains, but can also be found on bus services. Inspectors may begin an investigation if they believe a passenger is travelling without a valid ticket, such as an adult travelling on a child ticket, an out of date or invalid ticket, or if the passenger has travelled beyond the destination printed on their ticket, with the intent to avoid their correct rail or bus fare. If the revenue inspector or officer believes there was intent to avoid payment, a penalty fare may be issued, or the passenger may be reported for prosecution. Inspectors usually wear a uniform provided by their employer..

In some areas, penalty fare schemes operate with a minimum charge of £100 (£50 if paid within 14 days) plus the full single fare for the journey made. In other areas, the penalty is £80. These penalty fare areas are clearly advertised with large yellow station posters. If the journey is to be continued, the fare for the remaining portion is also taken into account.

Inspectors can caution potential fare evaders before interviewing them for the purpose of reporting the offender for possible prosecution. If found guilty, offenders can currently face a maximum of a £1,000 fine or three months in prison.

East Midlands Railway, Merseyrail, Northern, Govia Thameslink Railway, South Western Railway, West Midland Railway, London Overground, Southeastern, c2c, Abellio Greater Anglia, TransPennine Express, Chiltern Railways and Great Western Railway are some of the train operating companies that participate in the penalty fare scheme. With bus companies such as Arriva, Stagecoach, First, National Express West Midlands and National Express Coventry also fining people.

Transport for London currently employs over 200 revenue protection inspectors that work on the bus network alone.

=== Powers ===
Revenue Protection Officers have the power to require anyone they reasonably suspect of a ticket or bylaw violation to provide their name and address. As of 23 January 2023, Revenue Protection Officers additionally have the power to require anyone suspected of a ticket or bylaw violation to provide their date of birth. However, RPOs cannot require a suspect to produce ID.

They also have the power to detain people under common or criminal law circumstances:

- if a person fails to provide their name and address after being required to because for lack of a ticket or failing to buy a ticket when required, (this legislation only applies to railways) and
- if a person fails to leave the train when reaching the point that has been paid for.

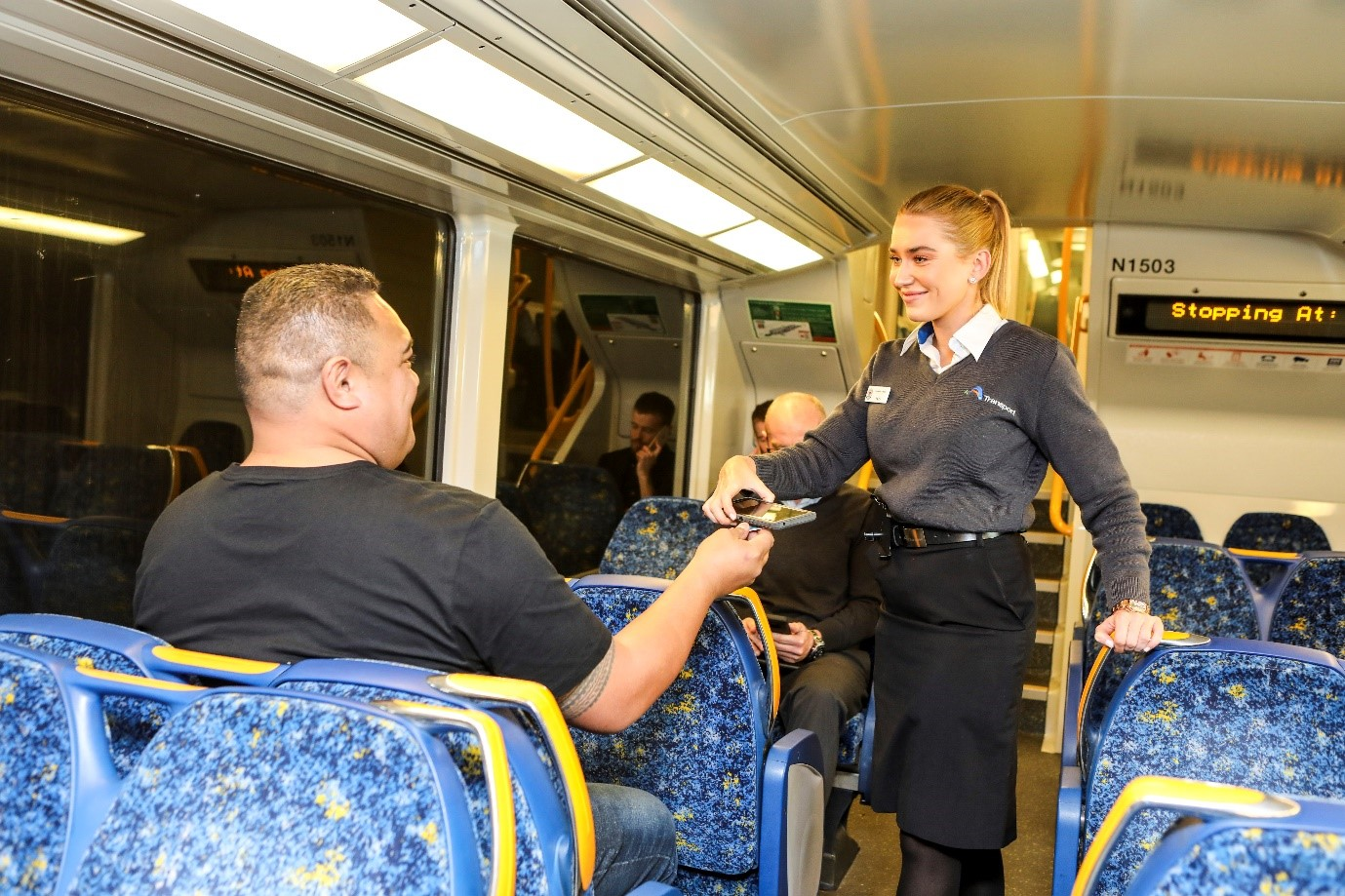
Ticket inspector in New South Wales

== Australia ==
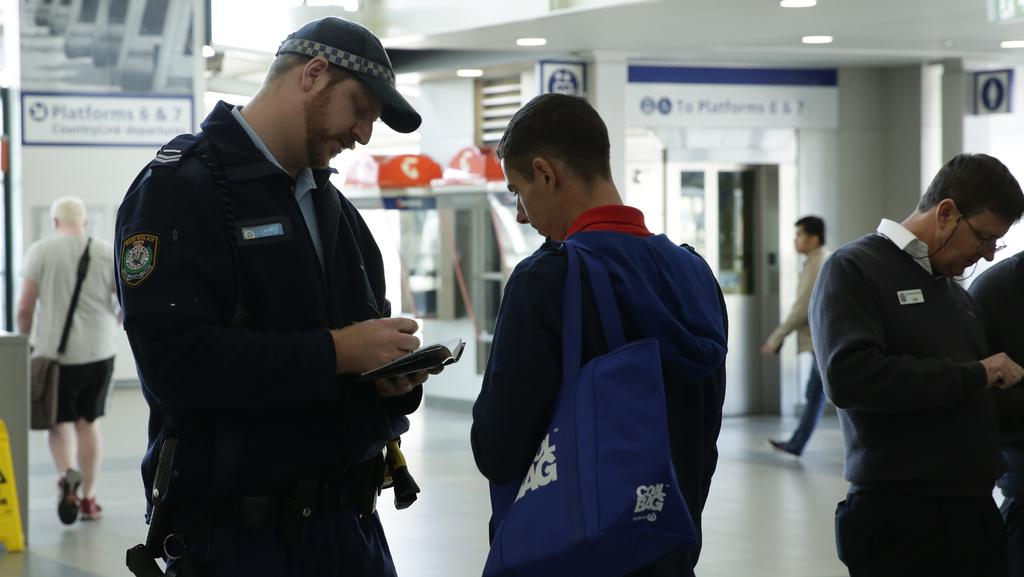
A member of New South Wales police force with a civilian

Revenue protection officers also patrol Yarra Trams and Metro Trains Melbourne services in Victoria. They were introduced in a bid to curb fare evasion after conductors were taken away from the trams. Replacement of conductors with ticket machines as the point of sale method has also resulted in thousands of commuters evading fares on Melbourne trams. Many people view RPIs and RPOs negatively, and in the discharge of their duties, they regularly face being verbally abused and sometimes even physically assaulted. It is believed that an estimated 1,500 people are reported each week on services.

=== Breakdown of states ===
==== New South Wales ====
Revenue protection on the New South Wales rail network is primarily the responsibility of transit officers. Like their Victorian counterparts, these transit officers also carry out security patrols on trains and railway stations, with the power of issuing on-the-spot penalty notices for minor offences, and even to use "reasonable force" to make arrests.

Ticket officials on the G-link public transport system, Queensland

==== Queensland ====
Queensland Rail, G:link and Translink employ authorised officers and senior network officers to patrol bus, train, ferry and tram services.

==== Victoria ====
Regardless of their attire, revenue protection personnel must produce identification when discharging their duties; they have to surrender their identity, address and supervisor if asked by a passenger who they find guilty of an offense. They operate by asking the alleged perpetrator to pay a $75 penalty fare immediately, or, if the person who committed the offence is not offered this option or otherwise does not pay on the spot, they instead request for the person's name, address and proof of identity to submit a report to the Department of Transport, in which case the fine can increase to $212. The former option does not allow an appeal or refund, but neither does a suspect have to provide their name and address. The latter option allows the accused person to challenge the penalty in court, appeal the matter, request for a payment plan or apply for a work and development permit. Should the alleged offender elect to request a review, the department can either continue requiring a financial penalty, request to have a court hearing, cancel the fine and issue a warning to the person, withdraw and take no further action or reduce the fees payable.

As of 2017, however, the on-the-spot system was abolished and replaced with a blanket penalty amounting to $240 for adults or $80 for minors. Revenue protection personnel may use their discretion to issue either a warning or an infringement notice.

Because the Victoria tram system relies on a 'honour system', where commuters can freely access a tram without barriers blocking them, plain-clothed personnel are much more common on these modes of transport rather than on trains or buses, although undercover employees are known to patrol all types of vehicles.

==== Public Transport Authority, ====
Transit Officers are employed directly by the PTA and have powers of a Public Officer as per the Criminal Investigation Act 2004. Prior to the commencement of the Public Transport Authority Act they were known as 'Railway Special Constables'. Transit Officers have similar powers to Police on Transport Property, they can arrest, search, transport and prosecute a person without any requirement for Police to attend. PTA Revenue Protection Officers wear a similar uniform, however are employed by a private security company contracted to the PTA. The contractor is currently MSS. They are required to attend a 21-day training course that includes legal powers, railway geography, ticket checking and rails identification safety.

Transport Security are the PTA Bus and Ferry Operations unit that utilise contract private security staff. The current contractor is Wilson Security. They patrol on board vehicles, by foot at bus terminals and in marked cars.

Security contractors have limited powers under the Act.

'Inhalation of a substance' (aka 'petrol sniffing') is an offence on PTA property, however it is not under the Criminal Code Crime Act Compilation Act 1913

=== Powers ===
Railway employees in Australia generally have the same power to detain a person who may have committed an offence as those in the United Kingdom:

- They can check a commuter's ticket and/or evidence of concession, even after the passenger has left the vehicle or station
- They can retain a ticket for use as evidence unless the commuter has an electronic ticket
- Unlike inspectors in the UK, those in Australia are generally empowered to request identification from any person on premises or a vehicle. They can request a person of interest's name, address and evidence of identification (for example driver license, learner permit, proof of age, or Keypass)
- They can report the suspect to the Department of Transport
- They can detain any person who they believe may have committed an offence, who do not comply until the police arrives. However, this is only implemented in Victoria, and in other states, such as NSW, it is theoretically possible to run away from a ticket inspector without ramifications, unless there is a member, or members, of the police force in the general vicinity.

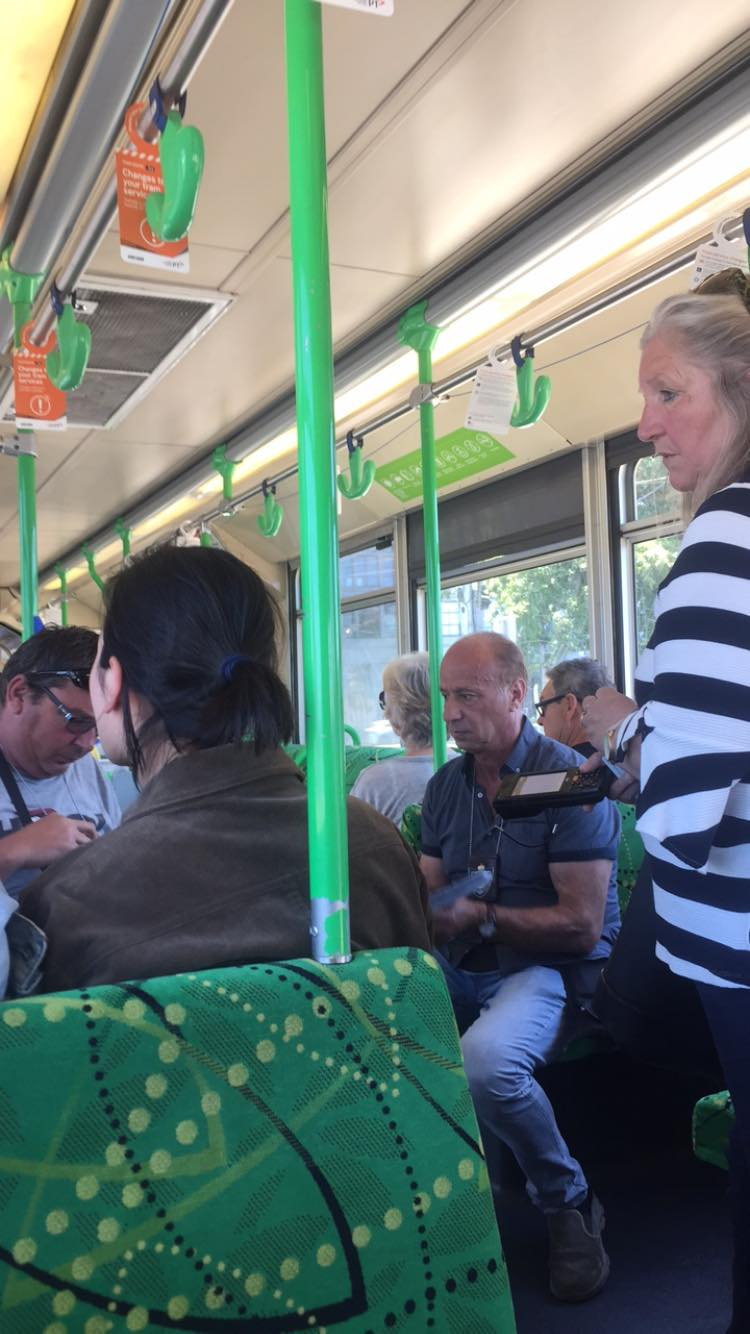
Undercover ticket inspectors on a tram in Victoria, Australia.

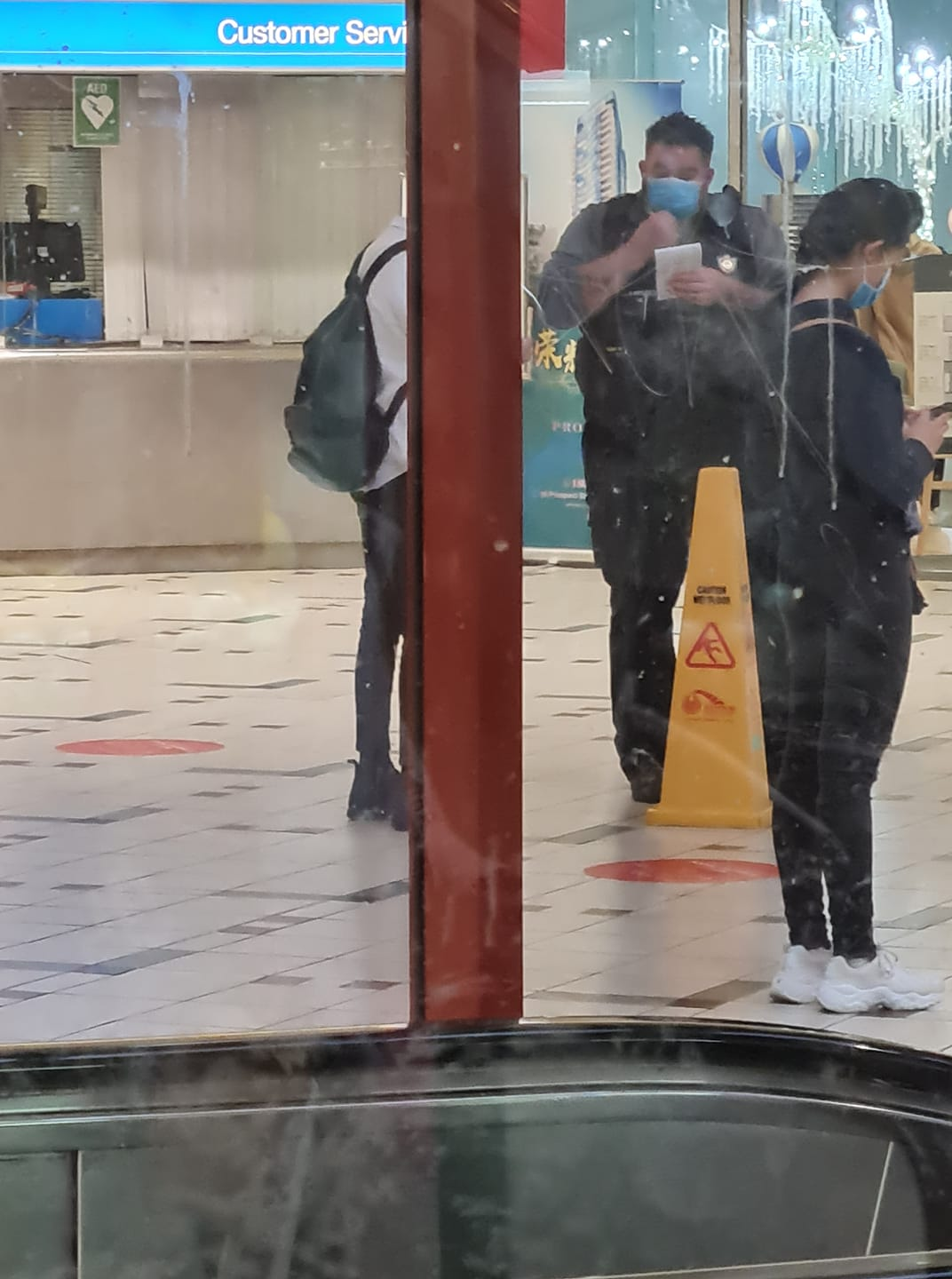
Uniformed ticket inspector in Melbourne, located in Box Hill station, reporting a commuter who has potentially violated laws of transportation

== See also ==
- Proof-of-payment
- Ticket controller (transportation)
- Conductor (transportation)
