= Australia Post Keypass identity card =

Australian identification card

- Sample of an Australia Post Keypass Identity Card
- Type: Photo card
- Issued by: Australia Post
- Purpose: Identification
- Valid in: Australia
- Eligibility: 18 years of age (apply from 17 years and 11 months)
- Expiration: 5 years
- Cost: $39.95 (adult) $29.95 (concession) $25 (NT resident)

The Keypass identity card was an Australian photo ID card issued by Australia Post. It could be used to authenticate the identity of the holder for many purposes, especially as an alternative for people who did not hold, or preferred not to carry, an Australian driver licence, photo card or passport. It could also serve as additional identification in situations where multiple identity documents were required, such as to open a bank account.

To apply, an individual was required to be at least 17 years and 11 months of age, though would not be sent their card until they turned 18. A version of Keypass for minors was also offered, ceasing in 2022. Unlike most identity photo cards and driver licences, a Keypass card could also be issued to visitors to Australia.

Australia Post stopped issuing new physical Keypass identity cards from 30 June 2023. Cards issued before this date continue to be valid until their expiry. A digital version of Keypass continues to be available through Australia Post Digital iD.

== Acceptance ==
The Keypass card could be used as proof of age and identity for many purposes across Australia, including to:

- enter licensed (alcohol-serving) and other age restricted venues
- purchase alcohol and tobacco
- prove identity at airports, hotels and hospitals
- redirect mail or collect parcels
- register for a driver licence in the Northern Territory, Victoria and Western Australia
- request public housing in Queensland and Tasmania
- apply for a Working With Children Check in-person in Victoria
- register for a maritime or aviation security ID card.

However, a Keypass card was not a formal government-issued identity document like a passport or driver licence. Its acceptance was not universal, and varied depending on legal requirements in different Australian states and territories or as determined by private companies for their services. Some organisations and services did not accept Keypass, such as the Australian Taxation Office.

== Cost ==
As at 2023, the cost of the Australia Post Keypass ID Card was:

- Full price: $39.95
- Concession price: $29.95
- Northern Territory resident: $25.00

== See also ==
- Identity documents of Australia
- Australian state and territory issued identity photo cards
- Australia Post Digital iD
