= Murder of Stephanie Scott =

2015 murder and rape in Leeton, Australia

- Stephanie Scott
- Location: Leeton, New South Wales, Australia
- Date: 5 April 2015
- Attack type: Sexual assault; Murder
- Weapon: Knife
- Victim: Stephanie Scott
- Convictions: Vincent Stanford; 15 years imprisonment (aggravated sexual assault); Life imprisonment (murder); Marcus Stanford; 1 year 3 months imprisonment (accessory after the fact to murder)

The murder of Stephanie Scott, a 26-year-old school teacher, occurred on 5 April 2015 in Leeton, New South Wales, Australia. Scott, an English and drama teacher at Leeton High School, disappeared six days before her scheduled wedding after being last seen visiting the school on Easter Sunday to prepare lesson plans. Her disappearance triggered a large-scale search and gained significant national media attention.

The investigation led to the arrest of Vincent Stanford, a 25-year-old cleaner at the school where Scott worked. Stanford had beaten Scott until she was unconscious, before raping and murdering her. Forensic evidence, including camera images of a burned body and mobile phone tower data, led police to Scott's remains the day after Stanford's arrest in the nearby Cocoparra National Park. Subsequent investigation revealed Stanford had made online searches relating to sexual violence and had engaged in stalking multiple girls and women at Leeton High School.

In July 2016, Stanford pleaded guilty to aggravated sexual assault and murder. He was sentenced to life imprisonment without the possibility of parole, with the presiding judge describing his offences as being in the "worst category" of murder. Vincent Stanford's identical twin brother Marcus was also sentenced to one year and three months imprisonment for accessory after the fact to murder. It was found Marcus had received and sold personal items belonging to Scott that had been mailed to him by Vincent, including her engagement ring.

The case had a significant impact on the Australian community, prompting the 'Yellow for Stephanie' and #putyourdressout movements. Scott's legacy is preserved through various memorials, including an amphitheatre constructed at Leeton High School and annual sporting events in the Riverina region.

== Background ==
Stephanie Scott was a 26-year-old school teacher in Leeton, New South Wales, where she taught English and drama at Leeton High School. Originally from Canowindra, New South Wales, Scott was described as a "happy and bubbly person", and was well-known and respected among the school and wider Leeton community. Scott was working in her first permanent teaching position at Leeton High School, and coached the school's girls' football team in the Bill Turner Trophy competition alongside her classes. Scott also played football for Leeton United Football Club. During her time at university in Wagga Wagga, Scott played three seasons of Australian rules football with the Riverina Lions women's team. At the time of her death she was preparing to marry Aaron Leeson-Woolley, her partner of five years. The wedding was scheduled for 11 April 2015 in Eugowra.

Vincent Stanford's police mug shot

Vincent Stanford, aged 25, lived in a small rental weatherboard home with his mother and older brother. Stanford was born in Australia before he and his family moved to the Netherlands when he was three. Shortly after this, his father Steve returned to Australia, and had no further contact with Stanford or his siblings. Stanford's mother and siblings later returned to Australia around 2011 and settled in Leeton. It was found that there were no adverse or dysfunctional circumstances in Stanford's childhood that may have caused his actions. He began working as a cleaner at various locations including Leeton High School in early March 2015.

Stanford was given strict terms of employment, including specific work hours, and was forbidden from attending the school outside of these hours. He was also only to be in areas associated with cleaning duties and was not given alarm access codes. Despite this, Stanford began attending the school outside his scheduled hours and in areas not associated with his employment. He was seen in and around the girls' toilets at the school, including when they were occupied. He "somehow" managed to obtain alarm access codes, despite the school's policy of not giving them to casual employees.

Stanford had passed all necessary police and Working With Children Check requirements before commencing his employment. An internal review by his employer, Colin Joss and Co, found that nothing could have been done to prevent Stanford's actions. This is refuted by family, who indicate Stanford's flouting of rules was a clear "red flag" that should have prompted action.

== Disappearance and investigation ==
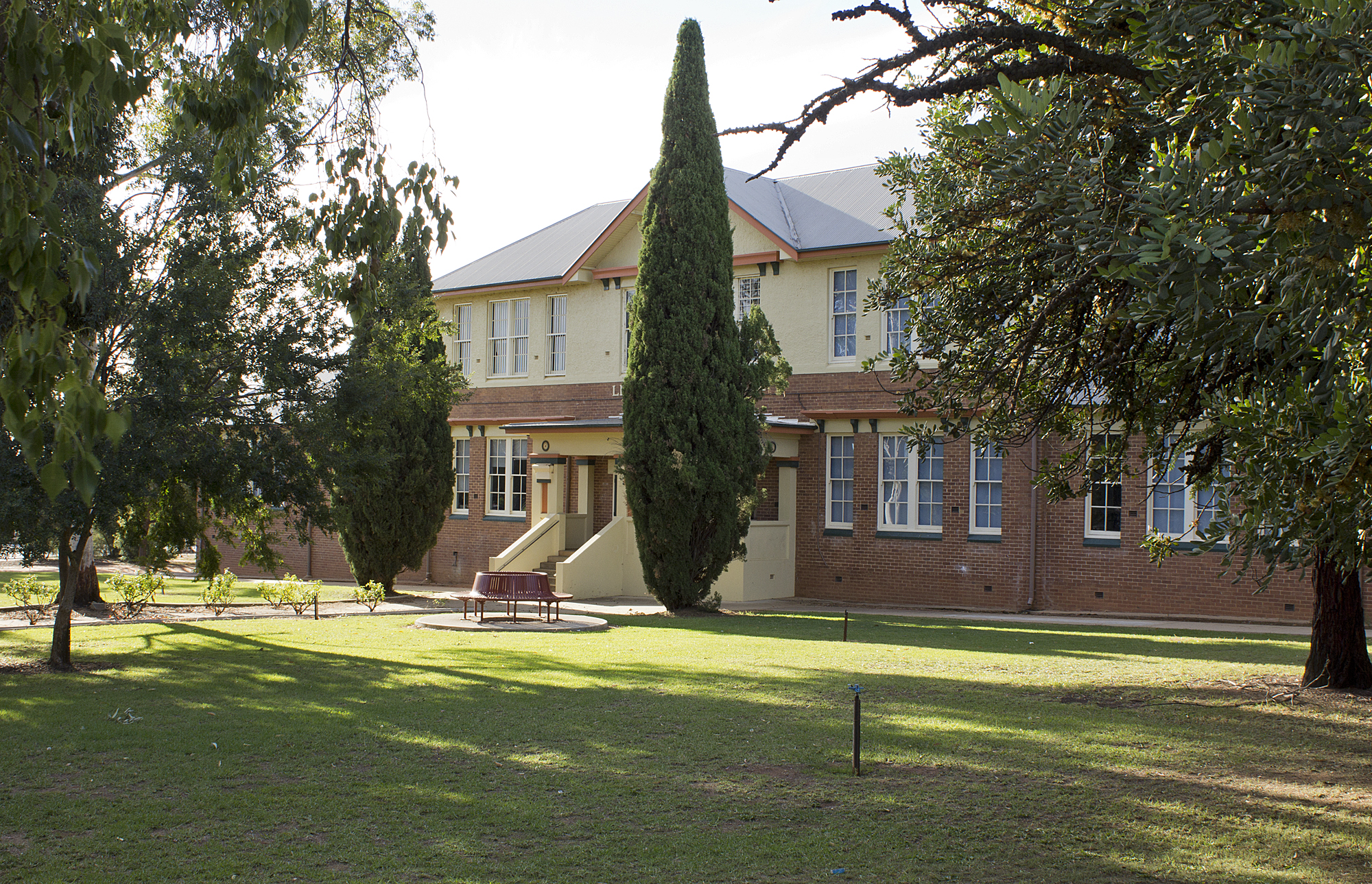
Leeton High School in 2012

On Easter Sunday, 5 April 2015, Stephanie Scott visited Leeton High School to prepare lesson plans for the substitute teacher who would cover her classes during her upcoming honeymoon in Tahiti. Her fiancé, Aaron Leeson-Woolley, had travelled to Canowindra on Good Friday for a friend's farewell party, though Scott did not attend due to their imminent wedding. Leeson-Woolley sent several text messages throughout the day, though they all went unanswered. Later, he found his fiancée absent upon his return that night. Assuming she had stayed elsewhere due to her feeling anxious about the wedding and his absence over the weekend, he waited until morning before reporting Scott missing at the Leeton Police Station.

Scott's disappearance sparked a large search effort, involving local police, SES volunteers, local sporting clubs and members of the wider Riverina community. Her disappearance was described as out-of-character and unusual by many, including her fiancé. Police stated Scott was last seen around 11 am at Leeton High School, when she collected the school keys from a colleague before entering the school alone. Her last communication was an email at 12:59 pm to a bus company, organising transport for her wedding guests.

Police established a task force entitled Strike Force Gundibri to investigate Scott's disappearance and began tracking her phone, social media, and bank accounts, none of which had seen activity since Saturday, the day before her disappearance. Searches included police divers searching canals and dams in the area.

On 7 April, investigations revealed Vincent Stanford's white Toyota Hilux had been seen continuously at the school over the weekend. Investigators went to Stanford's home to speak with him, where he claimed he was "cleaning the bins" over the weekend. Police and Leeson-Woolleymade continued appeals to the public for information regarding Scott and her red Mazda3.

On the morning of 8 April, a detective visited Stanford's home to speak with him, but Stanford was not home. Later that morning Stanford provided a statement at Leeton Police Station, claiming he had been cleaning at the school all weekend but had not seen anyone except some people roller-skating. Later that evening, police returned to Stanford's home to ask him for an interview and consent to search the property, but he was not there. Stanford's mother gave police permission to conduct a walkthrough of the home, where police observed fresh tyre tracks leading into the back shed. The tracks had a smaller track width than Stanford's ute, and police also found a used condom and piece of yellow tape. In Stanford's bedroom police found a set of keys matching the description of the school keys Scott had been given on the day of her disappearance. Police declared the residence a crime scene.

As police were conducting their search of the premises, Stanford returned home in his ute. He told officers he had been "out taking photographs" when they asked if he had been at work, and police noticed a camera in his ute. In the tray of the ute, there were several large MDF boards (wood-fibre boards used in construction and cabinetry), smeared with what appeared to be blood. Stanford's vehicle was seized and he agreed to accompany police to the station to be questioned, where police found an image of a badly burnt female corpse in bushland as the most recent image on the camera. Stanford denied the images were of Scott, claiming they were from a horror movie that he had saved because he found them "funny". Police then arrested Stanford for the murder of Stephanie Scott.

Leeton High School, Cocoparra National Park, and the location where Scott's car was found are marked on this map. Click on the icons for more information.

Police continued their search for Scott's body, as well as her red Mazda3 sedan. The car was located in the early morning of 9 April, 11 kilometres (6.8 mi) from Leeton, and police declared it a crime scene. The next day, police searching on dirt bikes located Scott's badly-burnt body on the edges of Cocoparra National Park.

== Legal proceedings ==
Vincent Stanford was arrested for Stephanie Scott's murder on 9 April 2015, four days after her disappearance and two days before her scheduled wedding. He was later charged with aggravated sexual assault on 3 June.

=== Circumstances of the attack ===
Stanford first noticed Scott when she was working in the staff room at Leeton High School on 5 April. He later claimed to police he had never met her before and did not know she was going to be at the school that day. In a videotaped police interview, Stanford described feeling "Just that I had to kill her. I wasn't angry or anything. Basically emotionless. Just that I had to kill her".

As Scott was walking along an enclosed corridor on her way home, she noticed Stanford and said "I'm going home now, have a happy Easter", before stopping to search in her bag for her keys. Stanford then grabbed her from behind, covering her mouth with one arm and dragging her into an old photographic darkroom. Once in the room, Stanford released Scott, and she attempted to flee as he closed the door, before Stanford pushed her and she fell face-down on the floor. Stanford gripped her throat and began beating Scott in the head up to 40 times, during which she became unconscious. It is agreed that Scott was alive at this point. After this, Stanford raped Scott. He then drew a 40cm knife from his pocket and stabbed her in the neck, later saying he was attempting to sever her carotid artery.

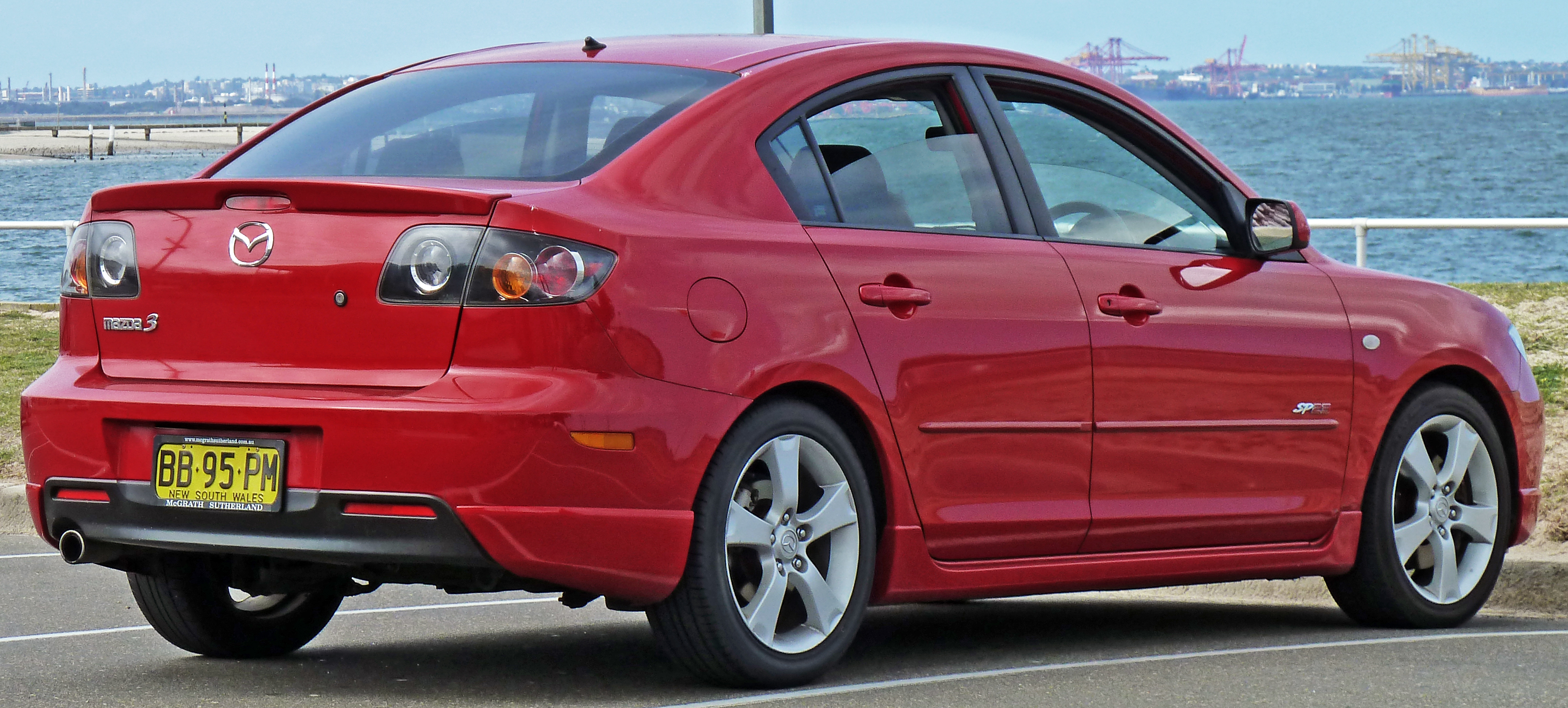
A red Mazda3 sedan, a similar model to Scott's car

Stanford left the scene and went home to have a cheese sandwich and cup of coffee before returning to the school. He cleaned the knife, picked up Scott's belongings that had been dropped as he was dragging her to the darkroom, then drove Scott's red Mazda sedan into the school grounds. Stanford loaded the body into the boot of the car after placing some yellow masking tape over the gash in Scott's neck, in an effort to slow the bleeding. After this, Stanford spent several hours cleaning up the crime scene before driving the Mazda back to his house and returning to the school on foot. He loaded the blood-soaked MDF boards into the tray of his ute before going home. Stanford was seen throwing Scott's laptop into a canal outside of Leeton, later recovered by police divers. Later that evening, Stanford drove the Mazda to a service station and filled a jerrycan with petrol.

Very early Monday morning Stanford drove the Mazda, with Scott's body in the boot, to Cocoparra National Park, about 50 kilometres (31 mi) north of Leeton. He removed her body from the boot and placed it on the ground, before removing all her clothing, and turning his phone on to take several pictures of the body. Stanford stacked branches on the body before dousing it in petrol, focusing on the lower torso and groin area, likely to destroy evidence of the rape. He drove Scott's Mazda to a road near Wamoon and walked back to Leeton, where he began disposing of Scott's belongings in various public bins.

On 8 April, Stanford's older brother noticed him burning several of Scott's belongings in the fireplace at their home. Later that day Stanford returned to Scott's body and took photos of the badly-burnt corpse. He also stopped at Scott's Mazda, "just to have a look".

=== Evidence ===
External videos
- Vincent Stanford's video confession for murdering Stephanie Scott played in court

There were sixteen volumes of evidence submitted during Stanford's trial, in a wide variety of media. The condom found by police in Stanford's backyard was found to have his DNA on the inside, and Scott's DNA on the outside, noted not to have originated from blood. The yellow tape found near the condom was determined to be that which Stanford used to cover the gash in Scott's neck. In a cupboard in Stanford's room police found more condoms, handcuffs and personal lubricant, all of which had Scott's blood on them. The murder weapon was located at the home, as well as a red bra that Scott was wearing when she was murdered. When asked why he kept the bra, Stanford responded "maybe I wanted a souvenir".

Scott's official cause of death was listed as blunt force head trauma following a post-mortem examination. She also suffered from bruising, fractures and lacerations on her head and face.

Digital forensic analysis of search histories from Stanford's personal devices revealed he regularly searched for violent rape, violent sex, hard-core pornography and murder, as well as necrophilia. The day before the murder, Stanford searched for "sharpest puncture knives", "sharpest knife you can buy" and "serial killer knives".

Stanford was also found to have been stalking and photographing several young girls at the high school, with over 1,800 images of a 12-year-old girl found on his phone, as well as log books of her schedule, comments such as "home alone, time to abduct", and a list of stupefying drugs such as valium and chloroform.

=== Marcus Stanford ===
Vincent Stanford's identical twin brother Marcus lived in South Australia at the time of Scott's murder. On 8 April, Vincent Stanford contacted his twin by text message, saying he was going to mail him some items he needed kept safe. After this, he sent two rings he had taken off Scott's body, as well as her driver's license. Marcus Stanford later sold these items on 9 May for $705 at his brother's instruction.

=== Court findings ===
Vincent Stanford pleaded guilty to raping and murdering Stephanie Scott on 20 July 2016, appearing in the Supreme Court of New South Wales via video link from Long Bay Correctional Centre in Sydney. His crimes were described by Hulme J, the sentencing judge, as "callous", "highly disturbing", and murder of the "worst category". On 13 October 2016, Stanford was sentenced to 15 years imprisonment for aggravated sexual assault and life imprisonment for murder.

Marcus Stanford pleaded guilty in the Supreme Court of New South Wales to accessory after the fact to murder and was sentenced to 1 year 3 months imprisonment, inclusive of time served, for his involvement in receiving and selling on Scott's rings.

=== Civil proceedings ===
Following the criminal convictions, Scott's fiancé, mother and siblings commenced civil action against the NSW Education Department and Vincent Stanford's employer Colin Joss & Co. In May 2021 the parties reached a confidential settlement. The family's lawyer, John Potter, stated that "The primary reason for taking the action was to ensure that the sort of risk that Stephanie Scott was exposed to is not repeated in the future, and that more stringent screening procedures are in place for employees who work at public institutions, such as schools." In response to the settlement announcement, the NSW Education Department said companies that perform services at schools were required to inform their personnel of expected standards of conduct, and that all cleaning staff had undergone a police records check, and a working-with-children check. They also stated that changes had been made to the working alone guidelines to strengthen the health and safety of teachers and staff.

== Public reaction ==
=== Media coverage ===
Scott's murder received extensive coverage in Australian media. A 2016 study published by Australia's National Research Organisation for Women's Safety (ANROWS) identified 875 media items relating to her murder during a four-month monitoring period in 2015. The study also found that coverage frequently emphasised Scott's upcoming wedding, with newspaper and online reports commonly describing her as a "bride-to-be". The researchers identified the case as an example of how news organisations prioritised unusual, high-profile incidents of violence against women over more common forms of gender based violence.

== Legacy ==
The murder of Stephanie Scott had a profound and widespread impact on the Leeton and wider Australian community. More than 1500 people attended her funeral held at the location of the scheduled wedding in Eugowra, New South Wales, where students, family, and close friends gave tributes describing Scott as a "beautiful person" who "knew how to brighten anyone's day". The colour yellow was Scott's favourite, and became a symbol of remembrance. Yellow was worn by many at her funeral service and in tributes around Australia. Hundreds of yellow helium balloons were released into the sky above the funeral service.

Women across Australia participated in the #putyourdressout movement, which gained international recognition and involved posting pictures of wedding dresses online and displaying them in a tribute to Scott. An amphitheatre was constructed at Leeton High School in Scott's memory.

== See also ==
- Murder of Jill Meagher
- Murder of Janine Balding
- Murder of Eurydice Dixon
- Murder of Anita Cobby
