= Stephanie Scott =

Stephanie Scott may refer to:

- Stefanie Scott - an American actress and singer born 1996
- Stephanie Scott - a teacher who was murdered and raped in Leeton, NSW, Australia in 2015
