= Digital identity in Australia =

In Australia, there are three main forms of digital identity:

- Online identity providers such as myID and Australia Post's Digital iD
- Services Australia's single sign-on portal myGov
- Digital versions of physical credentials or identity documents such as a Driver's License or a Medicare card

== Digital identity providers ==
=== myID ===
myID is a digital identity provider run by the Australian Government. myID allows users to verify their identity with government or non-government online services without having to provide their identity documents directly.

The process for logging into a website that supports myID is as follows:

1. The user selects "Continue with Digital Identity" and enters their email
2. The user enters the code generated by the myID mobile app
3. If the code is correct, the user will be successfully authenticated to the website

As of January 2025 myID supports logging into 76 different online services.

=== Australia Post Digital iD ===
Digital iD by Australia Post is a smart phone based app that allows users to create and validate their ID against the Australian Government Document Verification Service (DVS) and then use it as a primary ID system online and in person.

Users can use their Passports, Driver's Licenses or Medicare Card to assert and confirm ID online. A photo is taken, and head movement is detected to ensure the holder is real and their face matches. Your passport can be scanned using the phone's near-field communication (NFC) reader and used to assert biometrics. The user's image with dynamic security features, and an updating QR code are then displayed to people to verify the ID. The date of birth and full name are displayed on the app. Australia Post claims it is acceptable for use to validate the holder's identity. It can be used instead of KeyPass for holders 18 years and older.

The Digital iD website states that it is used by over 50 government and private organisations across a variety of industries and sectors. Launched in 2016, questions were raised as to longevity of the offering after the founder quit, however, continued investment from Australia Post has seen Digital iD become the first industry provider accredited under the federal government’s Trusted Digital Identity Framework (TDIF). Usage of Digital iD is growing, and Keypass in Digital iD is now accepted as proof of age to enter participating licensed venues and to purchase alcohol in Vic, Tas, Qld, ACT and NT (excluding takeaway alcohol in NT).

== myGov ==
myGov is a single sign-on service provided by the Australian Government that allows users to link together accounts with other government departments under the one account. It is primarily used for federal government services, however as of January 2025 some state government services have joined the service.

In order for a myGov account to be used with participating services the user must verify their identity using myID.

Some services supported by myGov include:

- Centrelink
- Medicare
- Australian Taxation Office
- Child Support
- Victorian Housing Register
- My Health Record
- National Disability Insurance Scheme
- My Aged Care
- Department of Veterans Affairs
- Workforce Australia

myGov also integrates with Australia Post MyPost Digital Mailbox to facilitate secure electronic document delivery, as most government departments avoid the use of e-mail to directly deliver private documents.

== Digital credentials ==
Some states and territories of Australia offer the ability for their residents to add a digital credential onto mobile phones for pre-existing licenses or identity cards. Digital credentials issued by state or territory governments are considered legal documents in Australia.

Digital credentials available by state or territory
State or territory	Issuing authority	Driver's License	Proof of Age Card	Working with Children Check
NSW	Transport for NSW	Available since 2019	Trial available for select residents in Western Sydney and the Blue Mountains	Available
Qld	Department of Transport and Main Roads	Available since 2023		Not available
Vic	VicRoads	Available since 2024		Available since 2023
SA	Department for Infrastructure and Transport	Available since 2017		Not available
NT	No digital credentials available			
WA	No digital credentials available			
ACT	No digital credentials available			

A digital Medicare card is also offered by the federal government through both the myGov website and the myGov app.

== Digital identity verification services ==
Identity and associated information can be verified a number of ways:

- The Australian Attorney-General's Department provides a Document Verification Service (DVS) that allows for validation of some licences.
- The Australian Attorney-General's Department also provides a bio-metric face verification service
- Visas, identity, and right to work status can be checked online through the Department of Home Affairs Visa Entitlement Verification Online (VEVO) service.
- Some States and territories allow for driver's licences, photo cards and certificates to be validated online e.g. NSW and Victoria.
- Electoral enrollment can be verified electronically, and may help to verify an identity.
- Private companies offer aggregated online identity checking services e.g. Vix Verify and Equifax
- In addition, certain aspects of individuals can be verified digitally – online, such as:
  - Working With Children Check to ensure that an individual has cleared the necessary background checks to allow them to work with children. To apply for a check the applicant must physically attend an agency, however the employer can verify the check online, for the duration of employment.
  - Australian Criminal Intelligence Commission (ACIC) allows organisations to provide National Police History Check certificates on ACIC's behalf. Some of these can be obtained online (such as Veritas), and later verified online.
  - Some institutions allow the online verification of education qualifications.

== See also ==
- Identity documents of Australia
