= AUSKey =

Australian authentication software

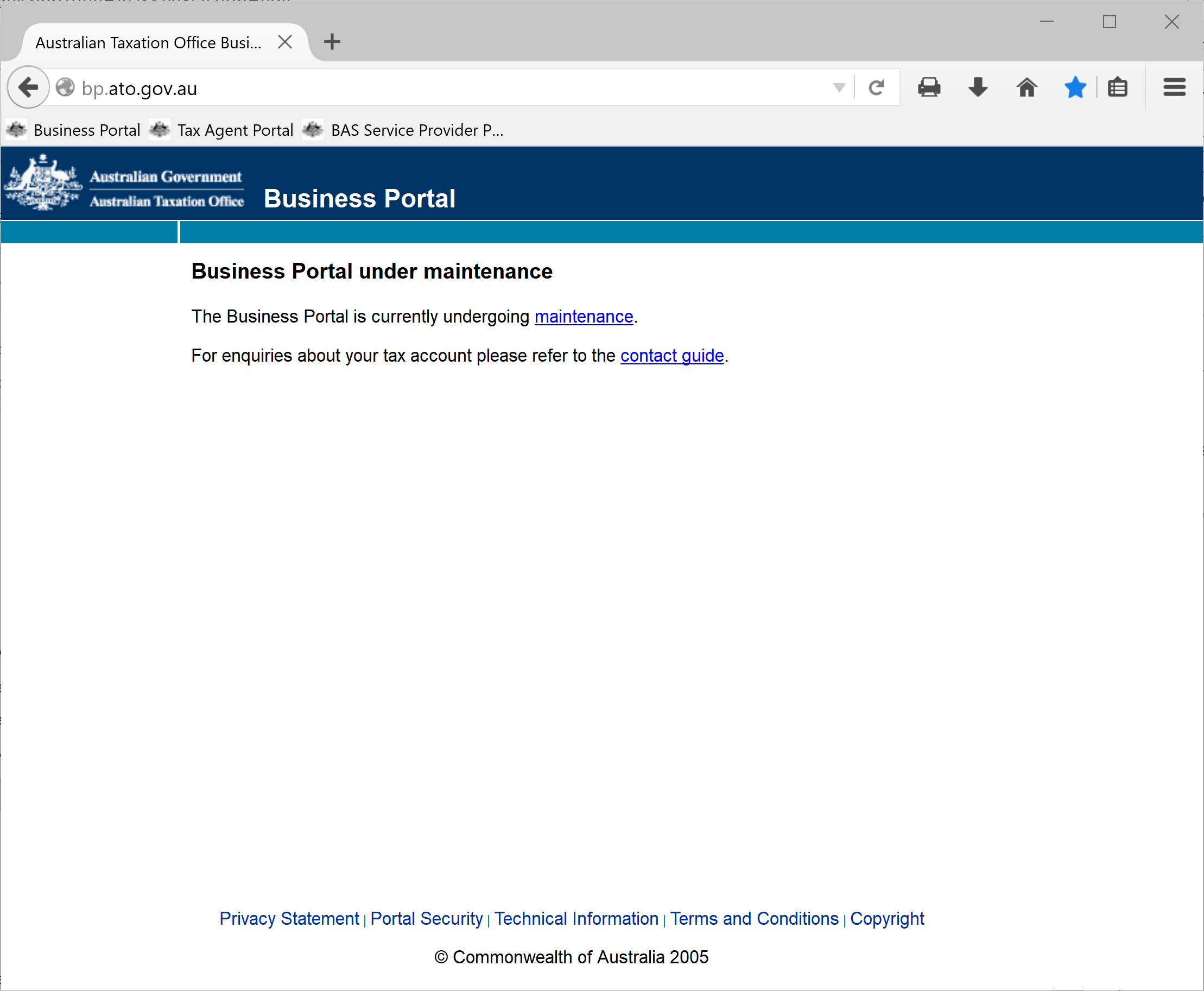
- A screenshot of the AUSKey browser in March 2020
- Developer: Verizon Business
- Release: April 2010; 16 years ago
- Final release: 2.0.3 / May 23, 2017; 9 years ago
- Engine: Gecko (browser version)
- Predecessor: client certificates
- Successor: myGovID
- Available in: English
- Website: ato.gov.au

AUSKey was a piece of software designed as an alternate, more secure authentication method for businesses and users of Australian Government websites. The software was developed by Verizon Business, and launched by the Australian Taxation Office in April 2010 to replace client certificates. In January 2020, it was announced that AUSKey would be retired and superseded in March that year by the newly released myGovID. On April 1, 2020 AUSKey was retired. AUSKey was available primarily as a browser extension for Firefox, Chrome, and Safari, as well as a special Firefox based web browser designed for use with a USB flash drive. AUSKey was available in two flavours, the "administrator" and "standard" types, designed for organisation administrators and users respectively.

== Participating websites ==
- Austrade
- Australian Business Register
- Australian Financial Security Authority
- Australian Prudential Regulation Authority
- Australian Securities & Investments Commission
- Australian Taxation Office
- Australian Communications & Media Authority
- NSW Department of Education and Communities
- Department of Education and Training and Inclusion Support Programme
- Department of Employment
- Department of Health
- Department of Home Affairs
- Department of Industry
- Department of Social Services
- Department of Veterans’ Affairs
- Workplace Gender Equality Agency
- All state & territory revenue offices
