= Access card =

Access card may refer to:

- Smart card, used for access control
  - Common Access Card
- Access Card (Australia)
- Access (credit card)
