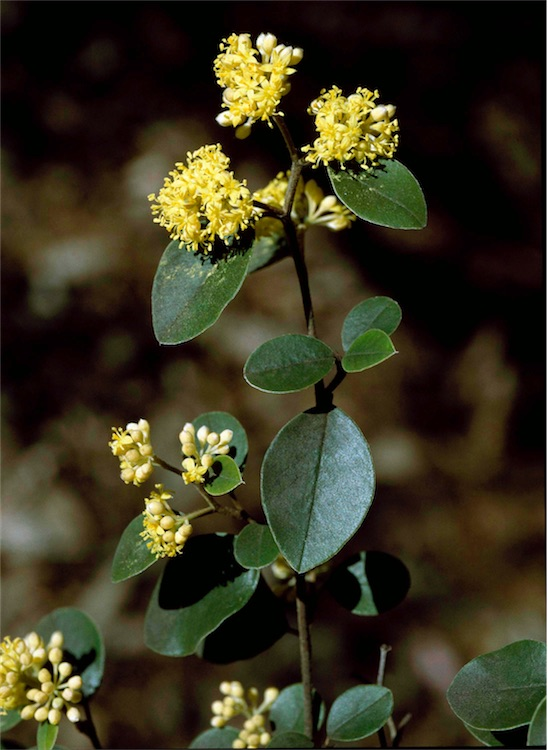
- In the Australian Botanic Garden Mount Annan

Conservation status
- Endangered (EPBC Act)

Scientific classification
- Kingdom: Plantae
- Clade: Tracheophytes
- Clade: Angiosperms
- Clade: Eudicots
- Clade: Rosids
- Order: Rosales
- Family: Rhamnaceae
- Genus: Pomaderris
- Species: P. cocoparrana

Binomial name
- Pomaderris cocoparrana N.G.Walsh

= Pomaderris cocoparrana =

Cocoparra pomaderris

Species of shrub

Pomaderris cocoparrana, commonly known as Cocoparra pomaderris, is a species of flowering plant in the family Rhamnaceae and is endemic to a restricted area of New South Wales. It is a shrub with hairy stems, egg-shaped to more or less round leaves, and clusters of yellow flowers.

== Description ==
Pomaderris cocoparrana is a shrub that typically grows to a height of 1–3 m (3 ft 3 in – 9 ft 10 in), its stems covered with rust-coloured hairs. The leaves are egg-shaped to more or less round, 10–30 mm (0.39–1.18 in) long, 8–15 mm (0.31–0.59 in) wide with lance-shaped stipules about 8 mm (0.31 in) long at the base. The upper surface of the leaves is dark green and glossy, the lower surface with greyish and rust-coloured hairs. The flowers are borne in small panicles, each flower on a pedicel 1.5–3 mm (0.059–0.118 in) long. The sepals are pale golden yellow, oblong and about 2 mm (0.079 in) long but there are no petals. The stamens are about 2 mm (0.079 in) long, the style about 1.5 mm (0.059 in) long and the fruit is a capsule about 4 mm (0.16 in) long.

== Taxonomy ==
Pomaderris cocoparrana was first formally described in 1990 by Neville Grant Walsh in the journal Muelleria from specimens collected by James Hamlyn Willis in the Cocoparra Range in 1969. The specific epithet (cocoparrana) refers to the type location.

== Distribution and habitat ==
This pomaderris is only known from rocky sites in the Cocoparra Range near Griffth in south-western New South Wales.

== Conservation status ==
Pomaderris cocoparrana is listed as "endangered" under the Australian Government Environment Protection and Biodiversity Conservation Act 1999 and the New South Wales Government Biodiversity Conservation Act 2016. The main threats to the species include grazing by feral goats and inappropriate fire regimes.
