= Photo identification =

Identity document that includes a photograph of the holder

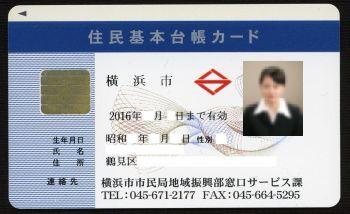
Identification card used in Japan

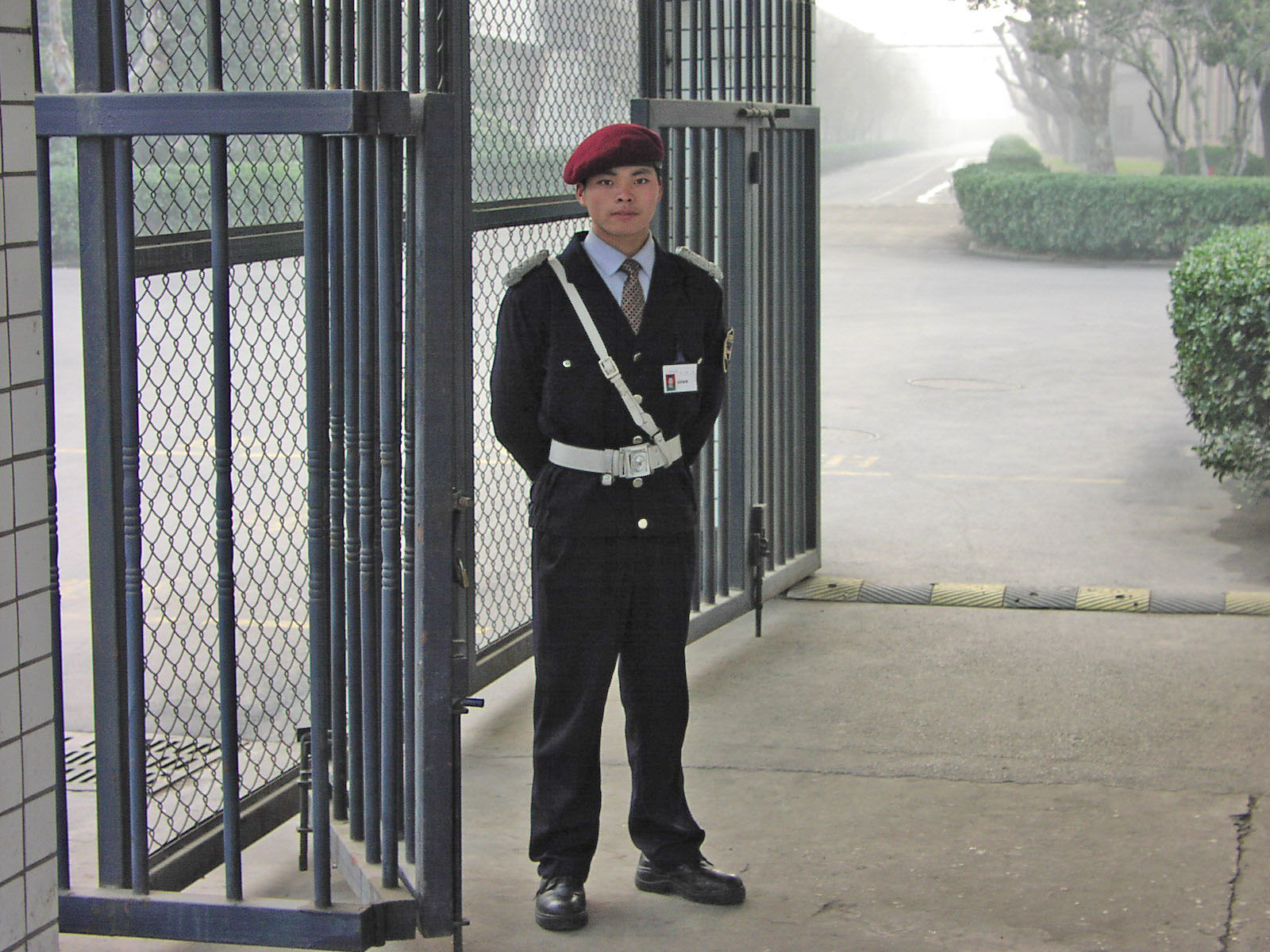
A security officer with Photo ID

Photo identification or photo ID is an identity document that includes a photograph of the holder, usually only their face. The most commonly accepted forms of photo ID are those issued by government authorities, such as driver's licenses, identity cards and passports, but special-purpose photo IDs may be also produced, such as internal security or access control cards.

Photo identification may be used for face-to-face authentication of identity of a party who either is personally unknown to the person in authority or because that person does not have access to a file, a directory, a registry or an information service that contains or that can render a photograph of somebody on account of that person's name and other personal information.

== Types ==
Some countries – including almost all developed nations – use a single, government-issued type of card as a proof of age or citizenship.

The United States, United Kingdom, Australia, New Zealand, Ireland, and Canada do not have such a single type of card.

Types of photo ID used in the US include:

- Passports, or Passport cards
- Driver's licenses, or state ID cards for non-drivers, issued by a state's Department of Motor Vehicles
- Company-issued ID cards
- Native tribal cards

Australian photo ID includes:

- Passports
- Australian state and territory issued identity photo cards
- Driving licence in Australia
- Australia Post Keypass identity card

== History ==
Photo identification cards appear to have been first used at the 1876 Centennial Exposition in Philadelphia, Pennsylvania. The Scottish-born Canadian photographer William Notman, through his affiliated business, Centennial Photographic Co., which had exclusive photographic concession at the exhibition, introduced a photo identification system that was required for all exhibitors and employees of the exhibition. The innovation was known as a "photographic ticket".

== See also ==
- Access badge
- Access control
- Common Access Card
- Credential
- Voter identification laws
