= Leeton High School =

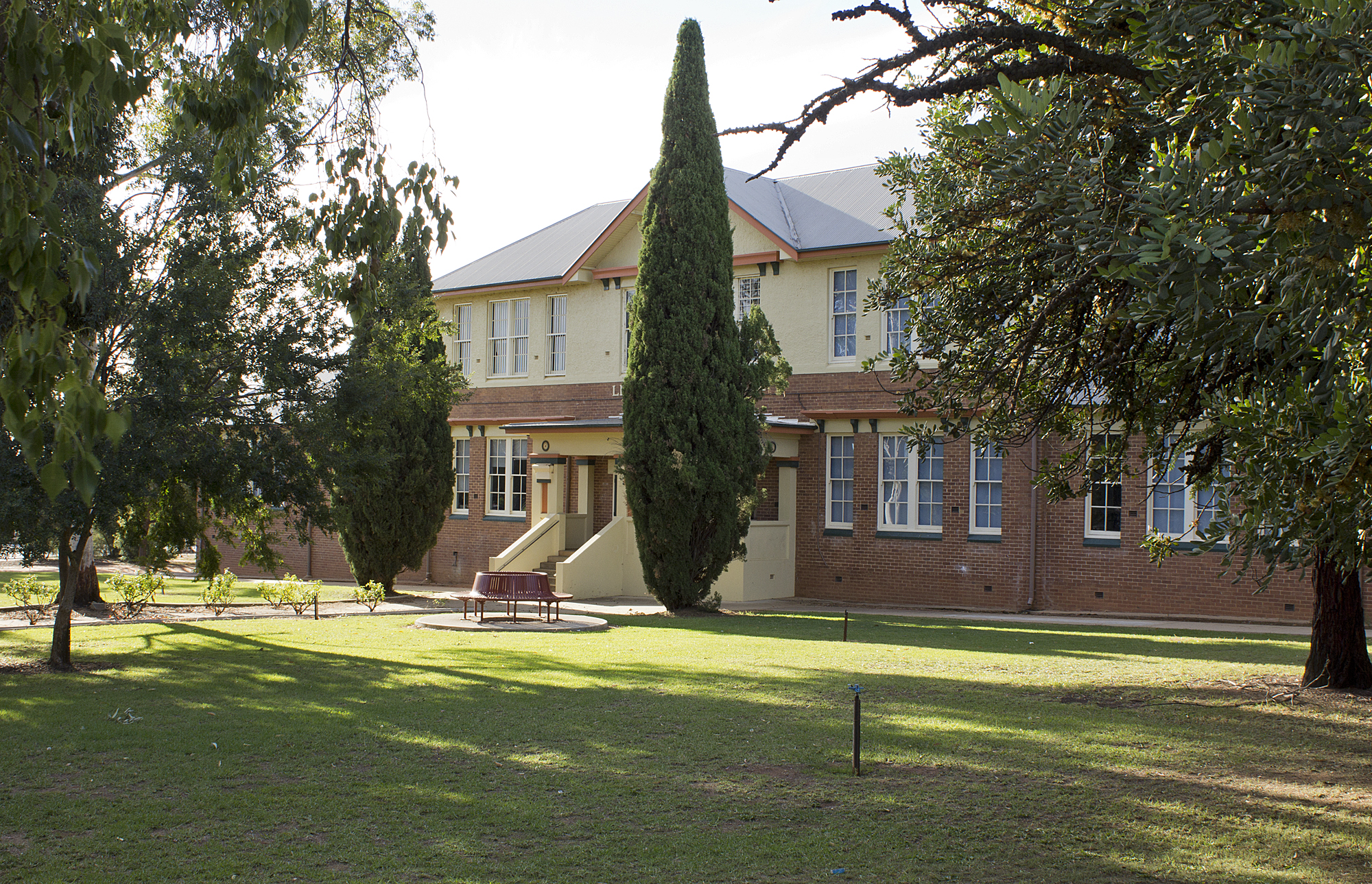
- Leeton High School, pictured in 2012

Location
- Leeton, Riverina, New South Wales; Australia
- Coordinates: 34°32′50″S 146°24′19″E

Information
- Former name: Leeton District School
- Type: Government-funded co-educational comprehensive secondary day school
- Motto: Latin: Qui Non Proficit, Deficit (Those who do not profit [by what we offer], lose)
- Established: 1926; 100 years ago (as Leeton District School)
- School district: Narrandera; Rural South and West
- Educational authority: NSW Department of Education
- Principal: Meagan Crelley
- Teaching staff: 42.9 FTE (2018)
- Enrolment: 465 (2018)
- Campus: Regional
- Colours: Black, white, grey
- Website: leeton-h.schools.nsw.gov.au

Leeton High School (abbreviated as LHS) is a government-funded co-educational comprehensive secondary day school, located in Leeton in the Riverina region of New South Wales, Australia.

Established in 1926 as Leeton's first high school and is now one of three secondary schools serving the Leeton Shire, the school enrolled approximately 470 students in 2018, from Year 7 to Year 12, of whom 13 percent identified as Indigenous Australians and nine percent were from a language background other than English. The school is operated by the New South Wales Department of Education; the principal is Meagan Crelley.

== History ==
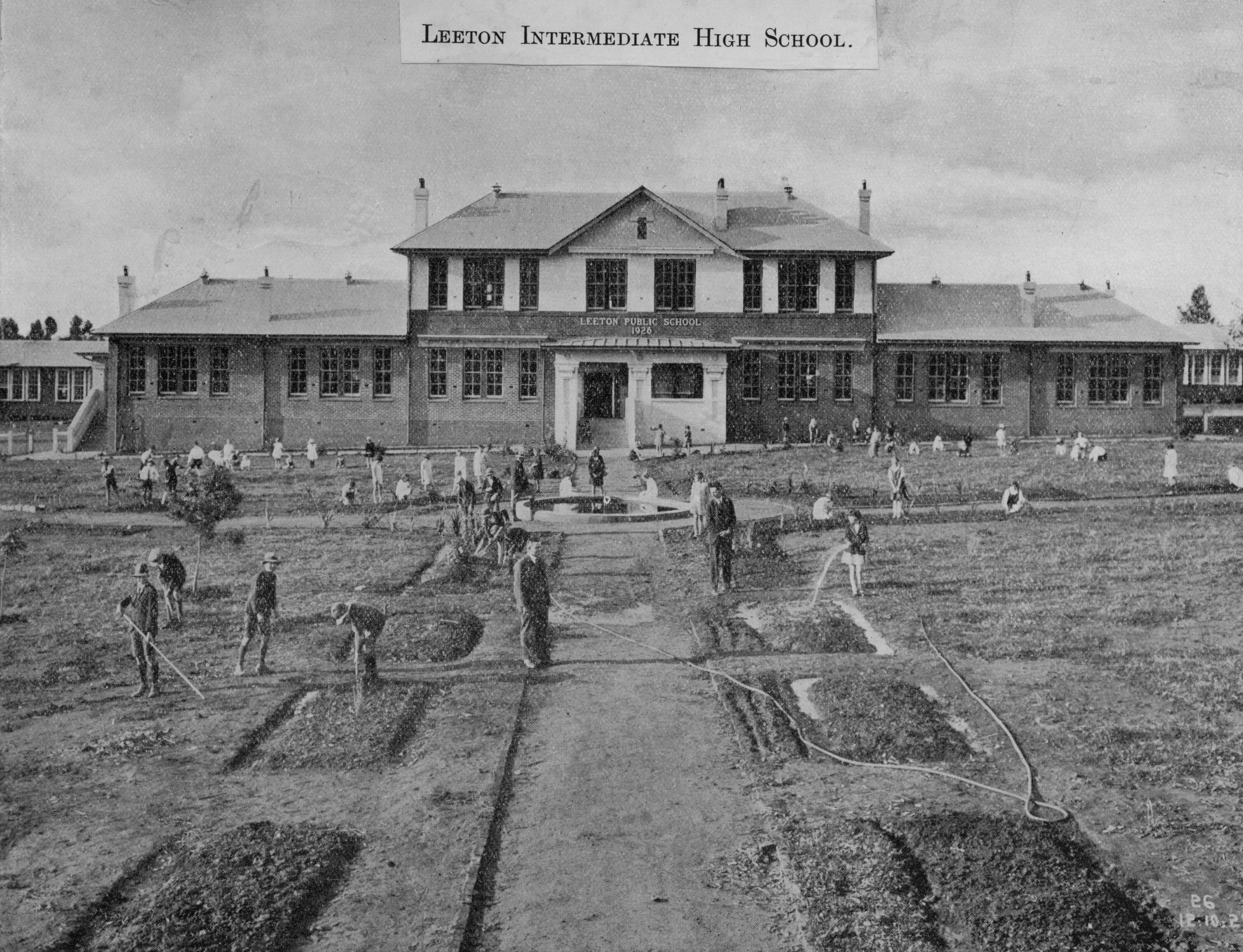
The "Old school building", pictured in 1927

The school was established on 18 September 1926 as Leeton District School by the Minister for Education, Thomas Mutch.

Raised to the status of Intermediate High School from 1 January 1928, the school was upgraded to a fully comprehensive high school in January 1947.

=== Significant events ===
In May 2005, the school was devastated by fire that destroyed the science block. A new state-of-the-art block was opened ahead of schedule in February 2006. In 2007, parts of the school were again devastated by fires. Later in 2007, the school was again devastated by fires, this time destroying the English wing. Work on rebuilding that wing finished in November 2009. There is currently no evidence or official statements to prove if it was arson.

On 5 April 2015, English and drama teacher Stephanie Scott was raped and murdered on the school grounds by janitor Vincent Stanford. Stanford was later convicted of murder, and sentenced to life imprisonment without parole. An amphitheatre was later built in the school as a memorial to her death.

== See also ==
- List of government schools in New South Wales: G–P
- List of schools in the Riverina
- Education in Australia
