= Health Care Card =

Australian documentation for concession health care benefits

The Australian Health Care Card is a card issued by the Australian Government which evidences the entitlement of the cardholder to concessions, such as the cost of some prescription medicines, medical services, and other government concessions. Eligibility for the card is determined by the eligibility (and registration) for various federal government welfare payments (see Centrelink). The benefits are clearly shown on the card. Some benefits (most notably public transport ones in some areas) are only available to recipients of certain Centrelink benefits.

The card is issued after an applicant has successfully applied for one or more of the associated payments. The card is valid for six months, after which time it is renewed if the holder continues to be in receipt of the payment for which the card was granted. This includes periods in which the holder received a "zero rate" of payment due to income reported.

== Eligibility ==
A person may be eligible for a Low Income Health Care Card if they are not eligible to a Pensioner Concession Card. This is assessed through a separate claim to a health care card, based on the average weekly income received by the claimant (and their partner, if applicable) in the eight weeks prior to claiming the card. Income thresholds for the card vary depending on the claimant's circumstances (i.e.: if single, a member of a couple, and a member of a couple with children), which the threshold increasing based on the number of children in care. Eligibility for the card is reassessed every six months.

A claim may be made for a Health Care Card from the age of 16 onwards. Eligibility criteria vary depending on the age and circumstances of the claimant.

== Benefits ==
A health care card will general cover the cardholder's family (cardholder, partner and children). An exception to this may be where a partner does not meet residency requirements for a health care card, or where the health care card has been issued in conjunction with a claim for Carer Allowance (in which case the card will be in the name of the person being cared for, and not the payment recipient).

Advantages of holding the card can include reduced:

- health care costs including PBS medicines, ambulance transportation, dental care and eye care
- public transport costs in many areas (excluding Queensland)
- water rates
- gas and electricity bills.

Some private businesses may also give discounts to cardholders, which are subject to the discretion of the provider, and are not administered by Centrelink.

== See also ==
- Access Card (Australia) – defunct proposed alternative
- Australia Card – defunct proposed alternative
- Medicare card
- Social security in Australia
