= Access Card (Australia) =

Proposed ID card scheme in Australia

The Access Card or Health and social services access card was a proposed Australian Government non-compulsory electronic identity card. Prime Minister of Australia John Howard announced the introduction of the scheme on 26 April 2006. Under the scheme, the card would be required for personal identification by an Australian citizen or permanent resident wishing to access benefits or services administered by the Department of Human Services, Department of Veterans Affairs or (from 2010) the universal Medicare. The scheme was to be phased in over two years, beginning in 2008, but the newly elected Labor Rudd Government terminated the project in November 2007.

== Scope ==
It was proposed that the Access Card would be required for identification purposes in accessing government benefits or services, such as:

- Welfare benefits administered by Centrelink, including:
  - unemployment,
  - disability,
  - veterans, and
  - study allowances.
- The Health Care Card and Seniors Health Card.
- Medicare subsidised health care, both bulk-billing and claim back.
- The Pharmaceutical Benefits Scheme (PBS), which provides subsidised medications.
- Child Support Agency Australia services.
- CRS Australia vocational rehabilitation.

== Card description ==
The Access Card was to have been a smartcard. Smartcard technology differs from ordinary magnetic strip cards in that the card contains a microchip rather than a simple magnetic strip. This means that instead of the card containing a number that relates to a record in a database, the data (usually encrypted) is actually stored on the card.

The Card was intended to have a photograph, the usual name of the holder – it did not have to be the legal name – the signature, the expiry date and the ID Number all visible on the front or rear of the Card. The chip was expected to include legal name, address, date of birth, details of children or other dependants, digitised photo, signature, card number, expiry date, gender, concession status and the cardholder's Personal Identification Number (PIN). Additional personal information could also be added at the will of the card holder. Such information may have included next of kin, organ donor status or drug allergies and also, according to Joe Hockey the former responsible government minister, shopping lists and perhaps MP3s. This extra information was to be secured with the user's PIN, so only those who needed it had access to it.

== Parliamentary process ==
An exposure draft of the proposed Bill was published on 13 December 2006 allowing for a four-week period during which public submissions could be made. Some minor changes resulted.

The Bill to implement the first stage of the scheme was the Human Services (Enhanced Service Delivery) Bill 2007 which was tabled in the Senate. A Senate Inquiry started on 8 February 2007, run by the Senate Standing Committee on Finance and Public Administration. The Committee called for submissions and heard testimony, then wrote a report all within six weeks.

The Report was delivered on 15 March 2007 and was scathing of the Bill in the form presented, demanding it be withdrawn and key provisions be re-thought. It also strongly recommended that the oversight and privacy provisions not await a later unseen Bill but be included in one package. The Minister, Senator Chris Ellison, withdrew the Bill to implement the Committees recommendations. A notable feature was that the Majority Report was written by Liberal Senators Mason, Fifield and Watson, recognised by some commentators as a striking case of Senatorial independence.

== Other reactions ==
=== Objections ===
One of the criticisms of the Access Card proposal was that the requirement for the card to be produced to access welfare and medical services made the card, in effect, compulsory. It was suggested that this was another attempt establish an Australia Card. On the other hand, Department of Human Services Secretary, Patricia Scott, told a Senate committee on 16 February 2007 that the wrongful detention of Cornelia Rau – who was held by immigration authorities for 10 months, despite being a legal resident – would not have occurred if the Access Card was running.

=== Function creep and unintended outcomes ===
The Card was to be the physical manifestation of the National Identity Register, containing the 17 classes of information outlined in the Act. The supporters of the Bill pointed to prohibitions within the Bill and the invoking of the Commonwealth Privacy Act 1988 to protect this information. At hearings in March 2007, the Australian Security Intelligence Organisation and the Australian Federal Police confirmed that all such information would be available to them without warrant. This was not put forward as part of the original case, and if anything was denied as a possible outcome. The Australian Bankers Association also called for limited access to the database to help prove identity of new customers.

=== Privacy ===
The Government established a Consumer and Privacy Taskforce under former Australian Competition & Consumer Commission head Allan Fels, which issued a discussion paper raising privacy concerns on 15 June 2006. The first report by the Taskforce was released in September 2006 and in November 2006 the Government rejected or partly rejected four of the 26 recommendations made by the taskforce.

== Implementation ==
On 22 January 2007, in a cabinet reshuffle, Joe Hockey, who had been heading the Access Card project, was appointed Workplace Relations Minister. Ian Campbell was appointed Minister for Human Services, taking over the implementation of the Access Card project in an election year. On 3 March, Campbell resigned as Minister, and was replaced by Senator Chris Ellison, formerly the Justice Minister. The project's chief technology officer was Marie Johnson.

The Office of Access Card issued a systems integrator request for tender (RFT) closing on 1 March 2007, with the contract expected to be signed between May and June 2007 . The 2007 election was called on 17 October 2007.

=== Software ===
The card was to have two card software platforms:

- a card management system (CMS) to manage and track access cards throughout their seven-year lifecycle.
- a key management system (KMS) to provide security protections for card data.

=== Registration ===
Registration was to have required an interview, planned to average 12 minutes, during which a biometric photo would have been taken. Applicants would have been required to produce sufficient identification documentation, similar to the 100-point check that is required for access to financial services. This documentation would have been copied or scanned for permanent storage. Registration was to have occurred at special offices in the initial two-year registration period, and then at selected Post Offices at every seven-year renewal.

== Closing of project ==
In November 2007 the newly elected Labor Rudd Government announced it was terminating the Access Card project, the Office of the Access Card and all associated entities. The Labor Party had initially supported the Access Card in principle, but with caveats over its implementation. However, in October the half way house policy was abandoned and a complete repudiation was decided upon.

== Similar programs in other countries ==
The United Kingdom introduced the British national identity card, a non-compulsory identity card in 2006, which was abandoned in 2010. France has had a similar, but less sophisticated, card for many years: the French national identity card. Other European and Asian countries also have national identity cards. For example, Singapore has since 1965 had the National Registration Identity Card.

== See also ==
- Health Care Card – the current system being used
