= MyID (Australia) =

Official government software for authenticating people's identification in Australia

myID
- Release: 3 October 2019; 7 years ago
- Stable release: 3.17.0.1 / 27 July 2026; 3 months ago
- Operating system: Android; iOS
- Size: 88 MB
- Website: myid.gov.au

myID, formerly myGovID, is a software application designed to be a centralised method of authentication for users of government websites and services in Australia. The myGovID app, developed by the Australian Taxation Office (ATO) and Digital Transformation Agency, first launched in October 2019, with a public beta being performed earlier that year in June. myGovID was created to unify the various authentication methods employed by departments across federal and local governments, most notably AUSKey. The app allows users to verify their identity using biometrics such as fingerprints or facial recognition.

As of November 2024, the myID app has a 1.9 star rating on the Apple App Store and a 2.7 star rating on Google Play. Common issues raised include a low standard for proof of identity, an ability to register multiple accounts under the same identity, a refusal to recognise government-issued IDs, an inability to change most details, and inadequate functionality.

On 1 April 2020, the ATO disabled its legacy AUSKey and "Manage ABN Connections" login methods in favour of myGovID. The subsequent traffic spike caused minor outages during the day.

myGovID was rebranded as myID in mid-November 2024.
