= Working With Children Check =

Type of Australian background check

The Working With Children Check (WWCC) is an Australian background check requirement, assessing the criminal record of those working or volunteering in child-related work. The check is known as the WWCC (or WWC) in most states and territories. The equivalent check in Queensland is known as a "Blue Card." In the ACT, the equivalent check is known as the Working with Vulnerable People registration (or WWVP).

In Australia, the Working With Children Check is legislated by each state and territory for the purpose of conducting background checks for people seeking to engage in child-related work. These checks aim to prevent people from working or volunteering with children if records indicate that they may pose an unacceptable level of risk to children. While the check is currently conducted on a state level, an Australian government royal commission has called for the transition to a nationwide check. At the same time, some researchers have questioned the effectiveness of a nationwide approach, citing advantages of the particular state scheme developments.

== History ==
In Australia, this form of pre-employment screening for child-related work began in 2000, when the state of New South Wales introduced its Working With Children Check scheme. Since then, every state and territory has established some form of the scheme. The eight state and territory children check schemes all operate independently of each other.

In 2016, South Australia announced it would be switching from a model of criminal background checks to a WWCC model, following a recent royal commission report.

=== Bars ===
In New South Wales, since changes to the WWCC system in 2013, about 1,800 people have been barred from working with children in the state as of 2016.

=== Legislation ===
Working With Children Check schemes in Australia
State	Name	Authority	Commencement	Legislation
Australian Capital Territory	Working With Vulnerable People (WWVP) check	Background Screening Unit, Access Canberra	2012	Working with Vulnerable People (Background Checking) Act 2011
New South Wales	Working With Children Check	NSW Office of the Children's Guardian	2000	Child Protection (Working with Children) Act 2012; Child Protection (Working with Children) Regulation 2013; Child Protection Legislation Amendment Act 2015
Northern Territory	Working With Children Check / Ochre Card	Screening Assessment for Employment – Northern Territory (SAFE NT), Northern Territory Police	2010	Care and Protection of Children Act 2007
Queensland	Blue Card Check / Working With Children Check	Blue Card Services / Public Safety Business Agency	2001	Working with Children (Risk Management and Screening) Act 2000
South Australia	DHS screening (changing to WWCC pending legislation commencement)	Screening Unit (DHS - Department of Human Services formerly known as DCSI - Department for Communities and Social Inclusion)	2011	Child Safety (Prohibited Persons) Bill 2016
Tasmania	Registration to Work with Vulnerable People (RWVP) / Working with Children Registration	Department of Justice	2014	Registration to Work with Vulnerable People Act 2013; Registration to Work with Vulnerable People Regulations 2014
Victoria	Working With Children Check	Department of Justice and Regulation, Working with Children Check Unit	2006	Working with Children Act 2005
Western Australia	Working With Children Check	WWC Screening Unit (Department for Child Protection and Family Support)	2006	Working with Children (Criminal Record Checking) Act 2004; Working with Children (Criminal Record Checking) Regulations 2005

== Application process ==
In NSW, the application process involves registering online with the Office of the Children's Guardian, and bringing 100 points of ID to a Service NSW centre. The verification is subsequently emailed to the individual, however, the employer is required to verify the check online as well.

Employers of child-related services need access and update the online WWC system with their current employees to include the Working With Children (WWC) number of each child-related employee. This means that technically if there is an adverse finding in the future, an employer could theoretically be notified, however there is no official requirement to do so, on the contrary, there is concern that lack of coordination between states may allow some adverse issues slip through. According to Working With Children NSW, if the verification result is CLEARED or APPLICATION IN PROGRESS, the worker may commence child-related work. If the verification result is NOT FOUND, EXPIRED, INTERIM BARRED or BARRED, the employer must not employ the worker for child-related work and it is a criminal offence to do so.

Once a person has a Working With Children Check they can seek employment in child-related work; the Check relates to the individual, not to the specific position of employment. As such, individuals may use the same check for multiple positions or workplaces.

The WWCC expires after a certain time (5 years) and should be renewed before the deadline to avoid employment compliance issues.

=== Exemptions ===
Certain roles and positions are exempt from the WWCC requirement. For example, in Queensland, shopping mall Santas are exempt, while those hired by schools and other venues are required to undergo the check. A parent who volunteers at their child's school may be exempt from the check. In other instances, some roles, such as tutors, will require a WWCC in some states but not in others. Schoolchildren are generally exempt from the check, however, the check is required for Year 12 students who repeated their studies (completing a 13th year), as they turned 18.

=== Privacy ===
The WWCC is intended to exclude people with inappropriate criminal histories from working with children, but at the same time, it is not a mechanism for accessing individual criminal history information. The WWCC process is actually designed to protect the individual from having to reveal their record, as the application is made by the individual, and if rejected is not otherwise publicised.

== Criticism ==
Some criticism of the WWCC system followed a report that a man being investigated by counter-terrorism authorities, who had previously been involved in a standoff with police at gunpoint in which he threatened them with a sword, continued to be authorised to work with children. Nesha Oneil Hutchinson, President of Australian Childcare Alliance NSW stated that the Working With Children Check system contained serious flaws where unless an individual was convicted of a crime against a child, they may still pass the check. This would allow individuals convicted of crimes against adults to be allowed to work with children. Additionally, the state-based system would possibly allow someone committed of a crime against a child in another state to receive the check as well.

In 2015, final decisions on thousands of applications for checks in South Australia were delayed due to staffing shortages. In some instances, individuals were unable to work while the applications were still being processed, leading members of the public to call for an interim measure to let people work at least until a new clearance was issued.

== See also ==
- Australian Criminal Intelligence Commission
- 100 point check
