= 100 point check =

Australian personal identification system

The 100 point check is a personal identification system adopted by the Australian Government to combat financial transaction fraud by individuals and companies, enacted by the Financial Transactions Reports Act (1988) (FTR Act), which established the Australian Transaction Reports and Analysis Centre (AUSTRAC) and which continued in existence under the Anti-Money Laundering and Counter-Terrorism Financing Act 2006.

The 100 point system applies to individuals opening new financial accounts in Australia, including bank accounts or betting accounts. Points are allocated to the types of documentary proof of identity that the person can produce, and they must have at least 100 points of identification to be able to operate an account. The system now also applies to the establishment of a number of official identity documents, such as an Australian passport and driving licence.

Additionally, 100 point checking also applies in superannuation. Members are required to provide 100 points of ID when applying to transfer their accumulation funds (receiving monies) to a pension-based fund (paying monies). "Reporting entities" are required to identify their customers using the 100 point check system. Accounts may be opened, but can only be operated (i.e. withdrawals made) by an identified customer; and an unidentified customer is blocked from making withdrawals. Generally, identification can be transferred from one account to another, so that for instance a person once identified does not need to produce documents again when opening a second account at the same institution.

An issue for many Australian organisations is the capture of credit card primary account numbers (PANs), referred to below under the 25 points section as credit cards or EFTPOS cards. This practice is not compliant with the Payment Card Industry Data Security Standard and must be removed from all 100 point check forms.

== Documents ==
=== Primary documents ===
70 points

Only one of the following may be claimed:

- Birth certificate
- Birth card issued by a registry of births, deaths and marriages
- Citizenship certificate
- Current passport
- Expired passport which has not been cancelled and was current within the preceding two years
- Other document of identity, having the same characteristics as a passport including diplomatic documents and some documents issued to refugees

=== Secondary documents ===
40 points

- Document issued by authorised deposit-taking institutions (ADIs), banks, building societies, credit unions or registered corporations. The signatory must be a known customer of at least twelve months standing.
- Written reference from one of the following institutions, verifying name of signatory and signed by both referee and signatory. The signatory must have been known to the referee for at least twelve months.
  - Another financial body certifying that the signatory is a known customer
  - Another customer who has been verified as a signatory by the cash dealer
  - An acceptable referee (refer to AUSTRAC Guideline No. 3 and Information Circular No. 3)
- Any of the following, which must contain a photograph and a name. Additional documents from this category are awarded 25 points.
  - Drivers licence issued by an Australian state or territory
  - Licence or permit issued under a law of the Commonwealth, a state or territory government (e.g. a boat licence)
  - Identification card issued to a public employee
  - Identification card issued by the Commonwealth, a state or territory government as evidence of the person's entitlement to a financial benefit
  - An identification card issued to a student at a tertiary education institution

35 points

- Name and address of signatory verified from any of the following:
  - A document held by the cash dealer giving security over the signatory’s property
  - A mortgage or other instrument of security held by another financial body
- Must have name and address on:
  - A document held by a cash dealer giving security over your property
  - A mortgage or other instrument of security held by a financial body
  - Local government (council) land tax or rates notice
  - Document from your current employer or previous employer within the last two years
  - Land Titles Office record
  - Document from the Credit Reference Association of Australia

25 points

- Must have name and signature on:
  - Marriage certificate (for maiden name only)
  - Credit card
  - Foreign drivers licence
  - Medicare card (signature not required)
  - Membership to a registered club
  - NRMA membership
  - EFTPOS card
- Must have name and address on:
  - Electoral roll compiled by the Australian Electoral Commission and available for public scrutiny
  - Records of a public utility – phone, water, gas or electricity bill
  - Records of a financial institution
  - A record held under a law other than a law relating to land titles
  - Lease/rent agreement
  - Rent receipt from a licensed real estate agent
- Must have name and date of birth on:
  - Record of a primary, secondary or tertiary educational institution attended by the applicant within the last ten years
  - Record of professional or trade association of which the applicant is a member

== See also ==
- Identity fraud
- Identity documents of Australia
