= Client certificate =

Digital certificate in cryptography

In cryptography, a client certificate is a type of digital certificate that is used by client systems to set up a secure connection to a remote server. Certificates contain information about the client and are signed by a certificate authority. Client certificates can provide mutual authentication without the use of passwords.

The Transport Layer Security protocol can optionally exchange and verify client certificates when setting up a connection. This can consequently be used to authenticate to websites and wireless networks.

== See also ==
- Client-authenticated TLS handshake
