= Cocoparra National Park =

National park in New South Wales, Australia

- IUCN category II (national park)
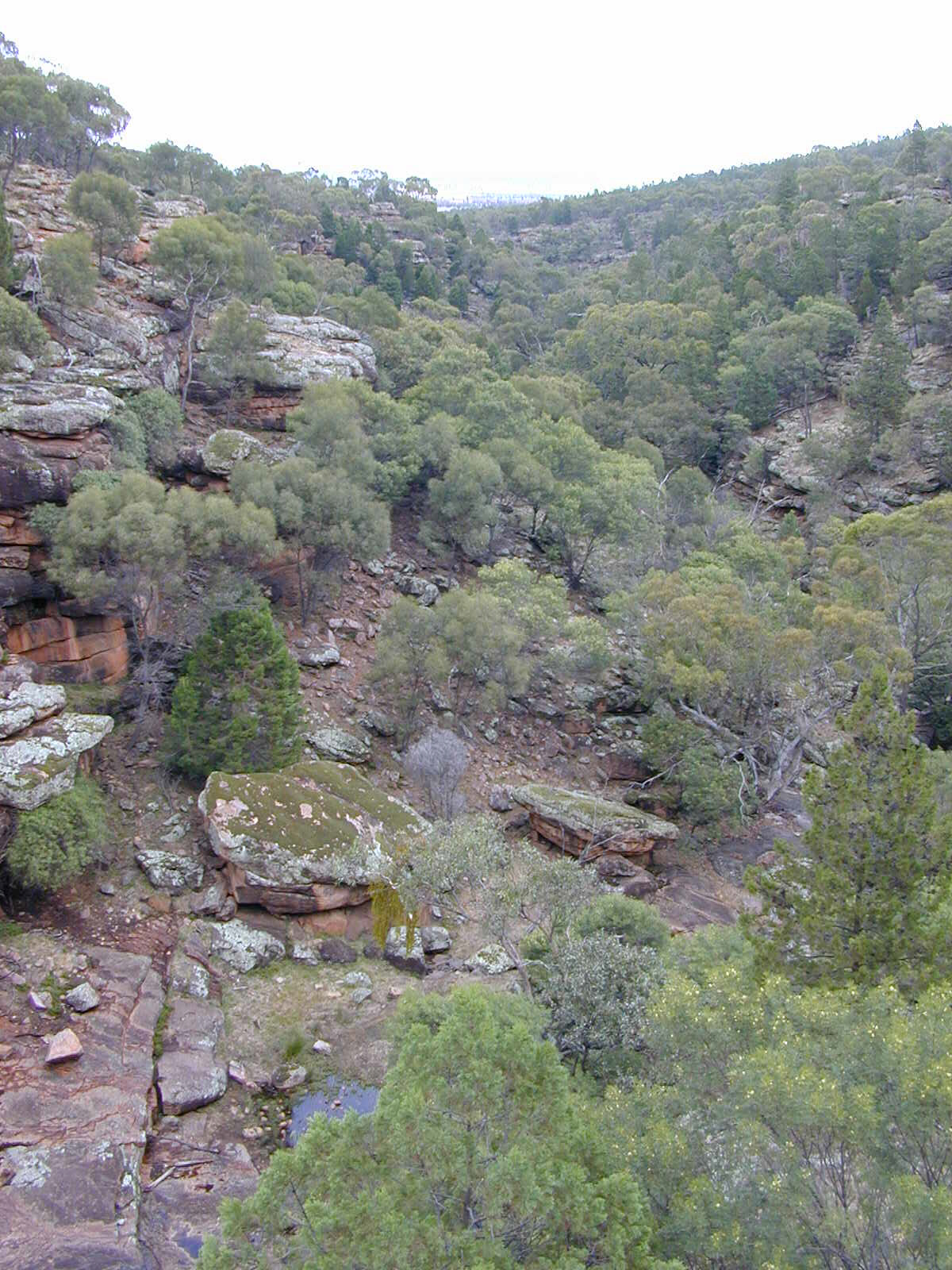
- Store Creek, located within the national park

- Location within New South Wales
- Location: New South Wales
- Nearest city: Griffith
- Coordinates: 34°06′57″S 146°13′23″E
- Area: 83.57 km^{2} (32.27 sq mi)
- Established: 3 December 1969
- Governing body: National Parks and Wildlife Service
- Website: http://www.nationalparks.nsw.gov.au/cocoparra-national-park

The Cocoparra National Park is a protected national park in the Riverina region of New South Wales, in eastern Australia. The 8,357-hectare (20,650-acre) national park is situated 457 kilometres (284 mi) southwest of Sydney and 25 kilometres (16 mi) northeast of Griffith. The name of the park comes from the Aboriginal cocupara, or kookaburra.

== Features ==
The park includes a prominent range of hills such as Bingar Mountain, 455 metres (1,493 ft) above sea level and Brogden Mountain, 390 metres (1,280 ft) above sea level, in an otherwise largely flat landscape. Adjoining the national park to the north is the Cocoparra Nature Reserve. The national park was gazetted in December 1969. The nature reserve was dedicated in 1963 with an area of 4,647 hectares (11,480 acres). The Binya-Cocoparra area is classified by BirdLife International as an Important Bird Area because of its relatively large population (of up to 50 individuals) of the near threatened painted honeyeater, as well as the diamond firetail.

The rugged, robust landscape of the park provides a large number of different habitats.

The climate is semi arid. The vegetation communities reflect this, with wattle, orchids, ironbark and blue-tinged cypress pines.

The geology comprises Upper Devonian sandstones, siltstones and conglomerates.

There are a number of day use (picnic) areas in the park and a campground at Woolshed Flat.

== See also ==
- Protected areas of New South Wales
- List of national parks of Australia
