= Alcohol dehydrogenase (disambiguation) =

Alcohol dehydrogenases are enzymes that catalyze the oxidation of alcohols to aldehydes or ketones.

Alcohol dehydrogenase may also refer to:

- Alcohol dehydrogenase (acceptor)
- Alcohol dehydrogenase (azurin)
- Alcohol dehydrogenase (cytochrome c)
- Alcohol dehydrogenase, iron containing 1
- Alcohol dehydrogenase (NAD(P)^{+})
- Alcohol dehydrogenase (NADP^{+})
- Alcohol dehydrogenase (nicotinoprotein)
- Alcohol dehydrogenase (quinone)
