= Short-term effects of alcohol consumption =

Symptoms of varying BAC levels. Additional symptoms may occur.

The short-term effects of alcohol consumption range from a decrease in anxiety and motor skills and euphoria at lower doses to intoxication (drunkenness), to stupor, unconsciousness, anterograde amnesia (memory "blackouts"), and central nervous system depression at higher doses. Cell membranes are highly permeable to alcohol, so once it is in the bloodstream, it can diffuse into nearly every cell in the body.

The concentration of alcohol in blood is measured via blood alcohol content (BAC). The amount and circumstances of consumption play a large role in determining the extent of intoxication; for example, eating a heavy meal before alcohol consumption causes alcohol to absorb more slowly. The amount of alcohol consumed largely determines the extent of hangovers, although hydration also plays a role. After excessive drinking, stupor and unconsciousness can both occur. Extreme levels of consumption can cause alcohol poisoning and death; a concentration in the blood stream of 0.36% will kill half of those affected. Alcohol may also cause death indirectly by asphyxiation, caused from vomiting.

Alcohol can greatly exacerbate sleep problems. During abstinence, residual disruptions in sleep regularity and sleep patterns are the greatest predictors of relapse.

== Effects by dosage ==
The definition of a unit of alcohol ranges between 8 and 14 grams of pure ethanol depending on the country. There is no agreement on definitions of a low, moderate or high dose of alcohol either. The U.S. National Institute on Alcohol Abuse and Alcoholism defines a moderate dose as alcohol intake up to two standard drinks or 28 grams for men and one standard drink or 14 grams for women. The immediate effect of alcohol depends on the drinker's blood alcohol concentration (BAC). BAC can be different for each person depending on their age, sex, pre-existing health condition, even if they drink the same amount of alcohol.

Different BACs have different effects. The following lists describe the common effects of alcohol on the body depending on the BAC. However, tolerance varies considerably between individuals, as does individual response to a given dosage; the effects of alcohol differ widely between people. Hence in this context, BAC percentages are just estimates used for illustrative purposes.

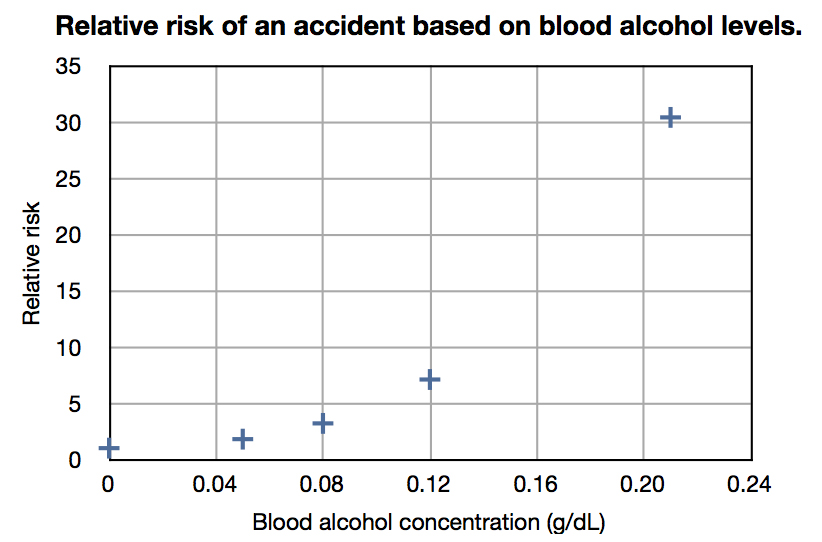

Progressive effects of alcohol
BAC (% by vol.)	SI units (mM)	mg/dL	Behavior	Impairment
0.001–0.029	0.22–6.3	1–29	May appear normal	Subtle effects detected with special tests
0.030–0.059	6.5–12.8	30–59	Decreased social inhibition; Joyousness; Mild euphoria; Relaxation; Increased verbosity	Decreased attentional control
0.060–0.099	13.0–21.5	60–99	Alcohol flush reaction; Reduced affect display; Disinhibition; Euphoria; Extraversion; Increased pain tolerance	Depth perception; Glare recovery; Peripheral vision; Reasoning
0.100–0.199	21.7–43.3	100–199	Analgesia; Ataxia; Boisterousness; Over-expressed emotions; Possibility of nausea and vomiting; Spins	Gross motor skill; Motor planning; Reflexes; Slurred speech; Staggering; Temporary erectile dysfunction
0.200–0.299	43.4–64.9	200–299	Anger or sadness; Anterograde amnesia; Impaired sensations; Inhibited sexual desire (ISD); Mood swings; Nausea; Partial loss of understanding; Possibility of stupor; Vomiting	Amnesia (memory blackout); Unconsciousness; Severe physical disability
0.300–0.399	65.1–86.6	300–399	Central nervous system depression; Lapses in and out of consciousness; Loss of understanding; Low possibility of death; Pulmonary aspiration; Stupor	Dysequilibrium; Breathing; Resting heart rate; Urinary incontinence
0.400–0.500	86.80–108.5	400–500	Coma; Possibility of death; Severe central nervous system depression	Respiratory failure; Heart rate; Positional alcohol nystagmus
>0.50	>108.5	>500	High possibility of death	

=== Effects on driving ===
Research shows an exponential increase of the relative risk for a crash with a linear increase of BAC. NHTSA reports that the following blood alcohol levels (BAC) in a driver will have the following predictable effects on his or her ability to drive safely: (1) A BAC of .02 will result in a "[d]ecline in visual functions (rapid tracking of a moving target), a decline in the ability to perform two tasks at the same time (divided attention)"; (2) A BAC of .05 will result in "[r]educed coordination, reduced ability to track moving objects, difficulty steering, reduced response to emergency driving situations"; (3) A BAC of .08 will result in "[c]oncentration, short-term memory loss, speed control, reduced information processing capability (e.g., signal detection, visual search), impaired perception"; (4) A BAC of .10 will result in "[r]educed ability to maintain lane position and brake appropriately"; and (5) A BAC of .15 will result in "[s]ubstantial impairment in vehicle control, attention to driving task, and in necessary visual and auditory information processing."

=== Moderate doses ===
Ethanol inhibits the ability of glutamate to open the cation channel associated with the N-methyl-D-aspartate (NMDA) subtype of glutamate receptors. Stimulated areas include the cortex, hippocampus, and nucleus accumbens, which are all responsible for both thinking and pleasure seeking. Another one of alcohol's agreeable effects is body relaxation, which is possibly caused by neurons transmitting electrical signals in an alpha waves-pattern; such waves are actually observed (with the aid of EEGs) whenever the body is relaxed.

Short-term effects of alcohol include the risk of injuries, violence, and fetal damage. Alcohol alters platelet response; moderate alcohol consumption can increase the amount of time bleeding by slowing down coagulation (as platelet aggregation decreases). Moreover, heavy alcohol consumption can lead to increased platelet aggregation thus increasing blood clotting and possibly leading to strokes and/or thrombosis. Alcohol has also been linked with lowered inhibitions, although it is unclear as to what degree this is chemical or psychological as studies with placebos can often duplicate the social effects of alcohol at either low or moderate doses. Some studies have suggested that intoxicated people have much greater control over their behavior than is generally recognized, though they have a reduced ability to evaluate the consequences of their behavior. Behavioral changes associated with drunkenness are, to some degree, contextual.

A related effect, which is caused by even low levels of alcohol, is the tendency for people to become more animated in speech and movement. This is caused by increased metabolism in areas of the brain associated with movement, such as the nigrostriatal pathway. This causes reward systems in the brain to become more active, which may induce certain individuals to behave in an uncharacteristically loud and cheerful manner.

Alcohol has been known to mitigate the production of antidiuretic hormone, which is a hormone that acts on the kidney to favor water reabsorption in the kidneys during filtration. This occurs because alcohol confuses osmoreceptors in the hypothalamus, which relay osmotic pressure information to the posterior pituitary, the site of antidiuretic hormone release. Alcohol causes the osmoreceptors to signal that there is low osmotic pressure in the blood, which triggers an inhibition of the antidiuretic hormone. As a consequence, one's kidneys are no longer able to reabsorb as much water as they should be absorbing, therefore creating excessive volumes of urine and the subsequent overall dehydration.

=== Excessive doses and overdose ===
Symptoms of ethanol overdose may include nausea, vomiting, CNS depression, coma, acute respiratory failure, or death. Levels of even less than 0.1% can cause intoxication, with unconsciousness often occurring at 0.3–0.4%. Death from ethanol consumption is possible when blood alcohol levels reach 0.4%. A blood level of 0.5% or more is commonly fatal. The oral median lethal dose (LD_{50}) of ethanol in rats is 5,628 mg/kg. Directly translated to human beings, this would mean that if a person who weighs 70 kg (150 lb) drank a 500 mL (17 US fl oz) glass of pure ethanol, they would theoretically have a 50% risk of dying.

Acute alcohol intoxication through excessive doses in general causes short- or long-term health effects. NMDA receptors become unresponsive, slowing areas of the brain for which they are responsible. Contributing to this effect is the activity that alcohol induces in the gamma-aminobutyric acid (GABA) system. The GABA system is known to inhibit activity in the brain. GABA could also be responsible for causing the memory impairment that many people experience. It has been asserted that GABA signals interfere with both the registration and the consolidation stages of memory formation. As the GABA system is found in the hippocampus (among other areas in the CNS), which is thought to play a large role in memory formation, this is thought to be possible.

Anterograde amnesia, colloquially referred to as "blacking out", is another symptom of heavy drinking. This is the loss of memory during and after an episode of drinking.

Another classic finding of alcohol intoxication is ataxia, in its appendicular, gait, and truncal forms. Appendicular ataxia results in jerky, uncoordinated movements of the limbs, as if each muscle were working independently from the others. Truncal ataxia results in postural instability; gait instability is manifested as a disorderly, wide-based gait with inconsistent foot positioning. Ataxia causes the observation that drunk people are clumsy, sway back and forth, and often fall down. It is presumed to be due to alcohol's effect on the cerebellum.

=== Mellanby effect ===
The Mellanby effect is the phenomenon that the behavioral impairment due to alcohol is less, at the same BAC, when the BAC is decreasing than when it is increasing. This effect was confirmed in a 2017 meta-analysis.

== Effect on different population ==
=== Based on sex ===
Alcohol affects males and females differently because of difference in body fat percentage and water content. On average, for equal body weight, women have a higher body fat percentage than men. Since alcohol is absorbed into body water content, and men have more water in their bodies than women, for women there will be a higher blood alcohol concentration from the same amount of alcohol consumption. Women are also thought to have less alcohol dehydrogenase (ADH) enzyme which is required to break down alcohol. That is why the drinking guidelines are different for men and women.

=== Based on genetic variation ===
Alcohol metabolism depends on the enzymes alcohol dehydrogenase (ADH) and aldehyde dehydrogenase (ALDH). Genetic variants of the genes coding for these enzymes can affect the rate of alcohol metabolism. Some ADH gene variants lead to higher metabolic activity, resulting in the accumulation of acetaldehyde, whereas, a null allele in ALDH2 causes an accumulation of acetaldehyde by preventing its catabolism to acetate. The genetic variants of these enzymes can explain the differences in the alcohol metabolism in different races. The different isoforms of ADH showed protection against alcoholic disorders in Han Chinese and Japanese (due to presence of ADH1B*2 ) and in African (due to presence of ADH1B*3). On the other hand, presence of ALDH2*2 in East Asians (a variant of the ALDH gene), can cause blood acetaldehyde levels of 30 to 75 μM or higher, which is more than 10 times the normal level. The excess amount of blood aldehyde produce facial flushing, nausea, rapid heartbeat, and other adverse effects. Presence of these alleles causes rapid conversion of alcohol to acetaldehyde which can be toxic in large amount. So, the East Asians and Africans feel the adverse effects of alcohol early and stop drinking. For Caucasians, ADH1B*1 allele is the most prevalent allele which causes slower conversion of alcohol to acetaldehyde and it makes them more vulnerable to alcohol use disorders.

=== Alcohol tolerance ===
Alcohol tolerance is increased by regular drinking. This includes direct tolerance, speed of recovery from insobriety, and resistance to the development of alcohol use disorder.

=== Subjective response ===
Individuals will have unique experiences of the effects of alcohol, including measurable differences in the extent of stimulating experiences during the beginning of a drinking episode as breath alcohol content (BAC) rises and sedative effects later in a drinking episode as BAC wanes. The combined influence of hedonic and aversive subjective experiences over the course of a drinking session are strong predictors of alcohol consumption and drinking consequences. There is also mounting evidence for consideration of SR as an endophenotype with some studies suggesting that it accounts for a significant proportion of genetic risk for the development of alcohol use disorder.

== Allergic reaction-like symptoms ==
Humans metabolize ethanol primarily through NAD^{+}-dependent alcohol dehydrogenase (ADH) class I enzymes (i.e. ADH1A, ADH1B, and ADH1C) to acetaldehyde and then metabolize acetaldehyde primarily by NAD^{2}-dependent aldehyde dehydrogenase 2 (ALDH2) to acetic acid. Eastern Asians reportedly have a deficiency in acetaldehyde metabolism in a surprisingly high percentage (approaching 50%) of their populations. The issue has been most thoroughly investigated in native Japanese where persons with a single-nucleotide polymorphism (SNP) variant allele of the ALDH2 gene were found; the variant allele, encodes lysine (lys) instead of glutamic acid (glu) at amino acid 487; this renders the enzyme essentially inactive in metabolizing acetaldehyde to acetic acid. The variant allele is variously termed glu487lys, ALDH2*2, and ALDH2*504lys. In the overall Japanese population, about 57% of individuals are homozygous for the normal allele (sometimes termed ALDH2*1), 40% are heterozygous for glu487lys, and 3% are homozygous for glu487lys. Since ALDH2 assembles and functions as a tetramer and since ALDH2 tetramers containing one or more glu487lys proteins are also essentially inactive (i.e. the variant allele behaves as a dominant negative), homozygote individuals for glu487lys have undetectable while heterozygote individuals for glu487lys have little ALDH2 activity. In consequence, Japanese individuals homozygous or, to only a slightly lesser extent, heterozygous for glu487lys metabolize ethanol to acetaldehyde normally but metabolize acetaldehyde poorly and are susceptible to a set of adverse responses to the ingestion of, and sometimes even the fumes from, ethanol and ethanol-containing beverages; these responses include the transient accumulation of acetaldehyde in blood and tissues; facial flushing (i.e. the "oriental flushing syndrome" or Alcohol flush reaction), urticaria, systemic dermatitis, and alcohol-induced respiratory reactions (i.e. rhinitis and, primarily in patients with a history of asthma, mild to moderately bronchoconstriction exacerbations of their asthmatic disease. These allergic reaction-like symptoms, which typically occur within 30–60 minutes of ingesting alcoholic beverages, do not appear to reflect the operation of classical IgE- or T cell-related allergen-induced reactions but rather are due, at least in large part, to the action of acetaldehyde in stimulating tissues to release histamine, the probable evoker of these symptoms.

The percentages of glu487lys heterozygous plus homozygous genotypes are about 35% in native Caboclo of Brazil, 30% in Chinese, 28% in Koreans, 11% in Thai people, 7% in Malaysians, 3% in natives of India, 3% in Hungarians, and 1% in Filipinos; percentages are essentially 0 in individuals of Native African descent, Caucasians of Western European descent, Turks, Australian Aborigines, Australians of Western European descent, Swedish Sami people, and Alaskan Eskimos. The prevalence of ethanol-induced allergic symptoms in 0 or low levels of glu487lys genotypes commonly ranges above 5%. These "ethanol reactors" may have other gene-based abnormalities that cause the accumulation of acetaldehyde following the ingestion of ethanol or ethanol-containing beverages. For example, the surveyed incidence of self-reported ethanol-induced flushing reactions in Scandinavians living in Copenhagen as well as Australians of European descent is about 16% in individuals homozygous for the "normal" ADH1B gene but runs to ~23% in individuals with the ADH1-Arg48His SNP variant; in vitro, this variant metabolizes ethanol rapidly and in humans, it is proposed, may form acetaldehyde at levels that exceed the capacity of ALDH2 to metabolize. Notwithstanding such considerations, experts suggest that the large proportion of alcoholic beverage-induced allergic-like symptoms in populations with a low incidence of the glu487lys genotype reflect true allergic reactions to the natural and/or contaminating allergens particularly those in wines and to a lesser extent beers.

== Pathophysiology ==
Epidemiology: Disability-adjusted life year for alcohol use disorders per 100,000 inhabitants in 2004. no data less than 50 50–150 150–250 250–350 350–450 450–550 550–650 650–750 750–850 850–950 950–1050 more than 1050

At low or moderate doses, alcohol acts primarily as a positive allosteric modulator of GABA_{A}. Alcohol also acts as a stimulant in low doses, as it triggers the release of dopamine in the striatum, with this mechanism also being responsible for the compound's interaction with the brain's reward system. Alcohol binds to several different subtypes of GABA_{A}, but not to others. The main subtypes responsible for the subjective effects of alcohol are the α_{1}β_{3}γ_{2}, α_{5}β_{3}γ_{2}, α_{4}β_{3}δ and α_{6}β_{3}δ subtypes, although other subtypes such as α_{2}β_{3}γ_{2} and α_{3}β_{3}γ_{2} are also affected. Activation of these receptors causes most of the effects of alcohol such as relaxation and relief from anxiety, sedation, ataxia and increase in appetite and lowering of inhibitions that can cause a tendency toward violence in some people.

Alcohol has a powerful effect on glutamate as well. Alcohol decreases glutamate's ability to bind with NMDA and acts as an antagonist of the NMDA receptor, which plays a critical role in LTP by allowing Ca2+ to enter the cell. These inhibitory effects are thought to be responsible for the "memory blanks" that can occur at levels as low as 0.03% blood level. In addition, reduced glutamate release in the dorsal hippocampus has been linked to spatial memory loss. Chronic alcohol users experience an upregulation of NMDA receptors because the brain is attempting to reestablish homeostasis. When a chronic alcohol user stops drinking for more than 10 hours, apoptosis can occur due to excitotoxicity. The seizures experienced during alcohol abstinence are thought to be a result of this NMDA upregulation. Alteration of NMDA receptor numbers in chronic alcoholics is likely to be responsible for some of the symptoms seen in delirium tremens during severe alcohol withdrawal, such as delirium and hallucinations. Other targets such as sodium channels can also be affected by high doses of alcohol, and alteration in the numbers of these channels in chronic alcoholics is likely to be responsible for as well as other effects such as cardiac arrhythmia. Other targets that are affected by alcohol include cannabinoid, opioid and dopamine receptors, although it is unclear whether alcohol affects these directly or if they are affected by downstream consequences of the GABA/NMDA effects. People with a family history of alcoholism may exhibit genetic differences in the response of their NMDA glutamate receptors as well as the ratios of GABA_{A} subtypes in their brain. Alcohol inhibits sodium-potassium pumps in the cerebellum and this is likely how it corrupts cerebellar computation and body co-ordination.

Contrary to popular belief, research suggests that acute exposure to alcohol is not neurotoxic in adults and actually prevents NMDA antagonist-induced neurotoxicity.

== Central nervous system impairment ==
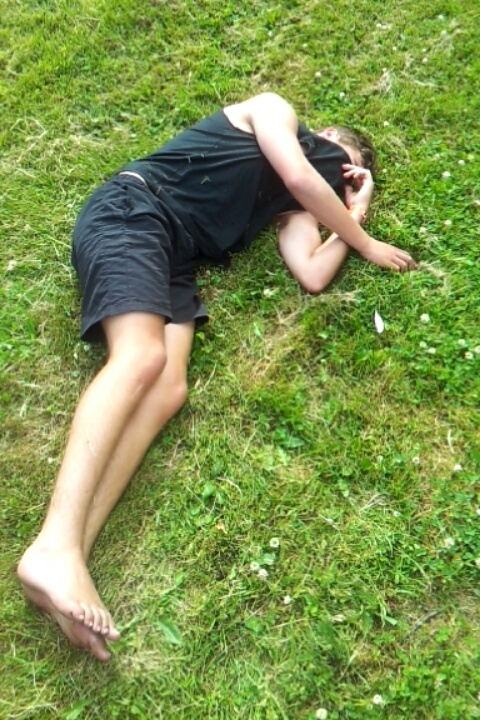
A young man lying comatose after a binge drinking session

Alcohol causes generalized CNS depression, is a positive allosteric GABA_{A} modulator and is associated and related with cognitive, memory, motor, and sensory impairment. It slows and impairs cognition and reaction time and the cognitive skills, impairs judgement, interferes with motor function resulting in motor incoordination, loss of balance, confusion, sedation, numbness and slurred speech, impairs memory formation, and causes sensory impairment. At high concentrations, it can induce amnesia, analgesia, spins, stupor, and unconsciousness as result of high levels of ethanol in blood.

At very high concentrations, alcohol can cause anterograde amnesia, markedly decreased heart rate, pulmonary aspiration, positional alcohol nystagmus, respiratory depression, shock, coma and death can result due to profound suppression of CNS function alcohol overdose and can finish in consequent dysautonomia.

== Gastrointestinal effects ==
Diagram of mucosal layer

Alcohol can cause nausea and vomiting in sufficiently high amounts (varying by person). Alcohol stimulates gastric juice production, even when food is not present, and as a result, its consumption stimulates acidic secretions normally intended to digest protein molecules. Consequently, the excess acidity may harm the inner lining of the stomach. The stomach lining is normally protected by a mucosal layer that prevents the stomach from, essentially, digesting itself. However, in patients who have a peptic ulcer disease (PUD), this mucosal layer is broken down. PUD is commonly associated with the bacteria Helicobacter pylori, which secretes a toxin that weakens the mucosal wall, allowing acid and protein enzymes to penetrate the weakened barrier. Because alcohol stimulates the stomach to secrete acid, a person with PUD should avoid drinking alcohol on an empty stomach (fasting). Drinking alcohol causes more acid release, which further damages the already-weakened stomach wall. Complications of this disease could include a burning pain in the abdomen, bloating and in severe cases, the presence of dark black stools indicate internal bleeding. A person who drinks alcohol regularly is strongly advised to reduce their intake to prevent PUD aggravation.

Ingestion of alcohol can initiate systemic pro-inflammatory changes through two intestinal routes: (1) altering intestinal microbiota composition (dysbiosis), which increases lipopolysaccharide (LPS) release, and (2) degrading intestinal mucosal barrier integrity – thus allowing LPS to enter the circulatory system. The major portion of the blood supply to the liver is provided by the portal vein. Therefore, while the liver is continuously fed nutrients from the intestine, it is also exposed to any bacteria and/or bacterial derivatives that breach the intestinal mucosal barrier. Consequently, LPS levels increase in the portal vein, liver and systemic circulation after alcohol intake. Immune cells in the liver respond to LPS with the production of reactive oxygen species, leukotrienes, chemokines and cytokines. These factors promote tissue inflammation and contribute to organ pathology.

== Sleep ==
Low doses of alcohol (one 360 mL (13 imp fl oz; 12 US fl oz) beer) appear to increase total sleep time and reduce awakening during the night. The sleep-promoting benefits of alcohol dissipate at moderate and higher doses of alcohol. Previous experience with alcohol also influences the extent to which alcohol positively or negatively affects sleep. Under free-choice conditions, in which subjects chose between drinking alcohol or water, inexperienced drinkers were sedated while experienced drinkers were stimulated following alcohol consumption. In insomniacs, moderate doses of alcohol improve sleep maintenance.

Moderate alcohol consumption 30–60 minutes before sleep, although decreasing, disrupts sleep architecture. Rebound effects occur once the alcohol has been largely metabolized, causing late night disruptions in sleep maintenance. Under conditions of moderate alcohol consumption where blood alcohol levels average 0.06–0.08 percent and decrease 0.01–0.02 percent per hour, an alcohol clearance rate of 4–5 hours would coincide with disruptions in sleep maintenance in the second half of an 8-hour sleep episode. In terms of sleep architecture, moderate doses of alcohol facilitate "rebounds" in rapid eye movement (REM) following suppression in REM and stage 1 sleep in the first half of an 8-hour sleep episode, REM and stage 1 sleep increase well beyond baseline in the second half. Moderate doses of alcohol also very quickly increase slow wave sleep (SWS) in the first half of an 8-hour sleep episode. Enhancements in REM sleep and SWS following moderate alcohol consumption are mediated by reductions in glutamatergic activity by adenosine in the central nervous system. In addition, tolerance to changes in sleep maintenance and sleep architecture develops within three days of alcohol consumption before bedtime.

== Balance ==
Alcohol can affect balance by altering the viscosity of the endolymph within the otolithic membrane, the fluid inside the semicircular canals inside the ear. The endolymph surrounds the ampullary cupula which contains hair cells within the semicircular canals. When the head is tilted, the endolymph flows and moves the cupula. The hair cells then bend and send signals to the brain indicating the direction in which the head is tilted. By changing the viscosity of the endolymph to become less dense when alcohol enters the system, the hair cells can move more easily within the ear, which sends the signal to the brain and results in exaggerated and overcompensated movements of body. This can also result in vertigo, or "the spins".

== Postprandial triglycerides ==
Alcohol taken with a meal increases and prolongs postprandial triglyceridemia. This is true despite the observation that the relationship between alcohol consumption and triglyceridemia is "J-shaped," meaning that fasting triglycerides concentration is lower in people who drink 10–20 grams of alcohol per day compared to people who either abstain from alcohol or who drink more per day.

== Blood pressure ==
A systematic review reported that alcohol has bi-phasic effect on blood pressure. Both systolic and diastolic blood pressure fell when they were measured couple of hours after alcohol consumption. However, the longer term measurement (20 hours average) showed a modest but statistically significant increase in blood pressure: a 2.7 mmHg rise in systolic blood pressure and 1.4 mmHg rise in diastolic blood pressure. A Cochrane systematic review based on only randomized controlled trials which investigates the acute effect of alcohol consumption in healthy and hypertensive adults is in progress.

== Pain ==
A 2015 literature review found that alcohol administration confers acute pain-inhibitory effects. It also found the relationship between alcohol consumption and pain is curvilinear; moderate alcohol use was associated with positive pain-related outcomes and heavy alcohol use was associated with negative pain-related outcomes.

== See also ==
- Alcohol and health
- Alcoholism
- Long-term effects of alcohol consumption
