= ADH1B =

Protein-coding gene in the species Homo sapiens

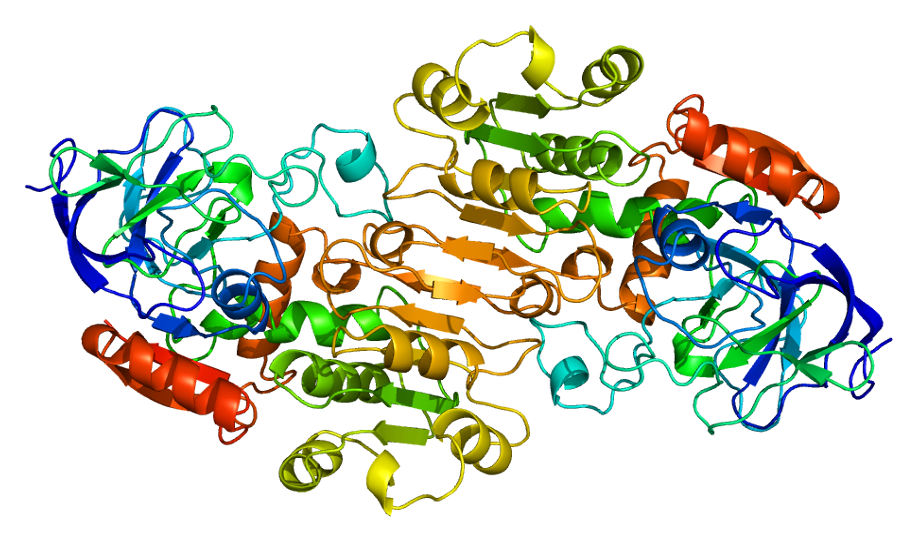

Identifiers
- Aliases: ADH1B, ADH2, HEL-S-117, alcohol dehydrogenase 1B (class I), beta polypeptide
- External IDs: OMIM: 103720; MGI: 87921; GeneCards: ADH1B
Available structures
PDB	Ortholog search: PDBe RCSB
PDB	List of PDB id codes 1DEH, 1HDX, 1HDY, 1HDZ, 1HSZ, 1HTB, 1U3U, 1U3V, 3HUD
Enzyme activity
EC #	BRENDA	ExPASy	KEGG	MetaCyc
1.1.1.105	↗	↗	↗	↗

Gene location (Human)
Chr.	Chromosome 4 (human)
Band	4q23	Start	99,304,971 bp
Band	4q23	End	99,352,760 bp

Gene location (Mouse)
Chr.	Chromosome 3 (mouse)
Band	3 G3|3 64.16 cM	Start	137,966,752 bp
Band	3 G3|3 64.16 cM	End	137,996,459 bp
RNA expression pattern
Bgee	Human / Mouse (ortholog); Top expressed in: right lobe of liver; right coronary artery; lower lobe of lung; abdominal fat; gastric mucosa; Descending thoracic aorta; left coronary artery; right lung; superficial temporal artery; left uterine tube / Top expressed in: conjunctival fornix; left lung lobe; transitional epithelium of urinary bladder; left colon; adrenal gland; left lobe of liver; gallbladder; seminal vesicula; efferent ductule; right kidney; More reference expression data
BioGPS	n/a
Gene ontology
Molecular function	oxidoreductase activity; zinc ion binding; alcohol dehydrogenase (NAD+) activity; metal ion binding; alcohol dehydrogenase activity, zinc-dependent; NAD-retinol dehydrogenase activity
Cellular component	cytoplasm; nucleoplasm; cytosol; plasma membrane
Biological process	ethanol oxidation; retinol metabolic process; retinoic acid metabolic process
Sources:Amigo / QuickGO
Orthologs
Databases	NCBI: entry; OMA: entry
Species	Human	Mouse
Entrez	125	11522
Ensembl	ENSG00000196616	ENSMUSG00000074207
UniProt	P00325	P00329
RefSeq (mRNA)	NM_001286650; NM_000668	NM_007409
RefSeq (protein)	NP_000659; NP_001273579	NP_031435
Location (UCSC)	Chr 4: 99.3 – 99.35 Mb	Chr 3: 137.97 – 138 Mb
PubMed search
- Wikidata
View/Edit Human	View/Edit Mouse

Alcohol dehydrogenase 1B is an enzyme that in humans is encoded by the ADH1B gene.

The protein encoded by this gene is a member of the alcohol dehydrogenase family. Members of this enzyme family metabolize a wide variety of substrates, including ethanol (beverage alcohol), retinol, other aliphatic alcohols, hydroxysteroids, and lipid peroxidation products. The encoded protein, known as ADH1B or beta-ADH, can form homodimers and heterodimers with ADH1A and ADH1C subunits, exhibits high activity for ethanol oxidation and plays a major role in ethanol catabolism (oxidizing ethanol into acetaldehyde). The acetaldehyde is further metabolized to acetate by aldehyde dehydrogenase genes. Three genes encoding the closely related alpha, beta and gamma subunits are tandemly organized in a genomic segment as a gene cluster.

The human gene is located on chromosome 4 in 4q22.

Previously ADH1B was called ADH2. There are more genes in the family of alcohol dehydrogenase. These genes are now referred to as ADH1A, ADH1C, and ADH4, ADH5, ADH6 and ADH7.

== Variants ==
A single nucleotide polymorphism (SNP) in ADH1B is rs1229984, that changes arginine to histidine at residue 47 of the mature protein; standard nomenclature now includes the initiating methionine, so the position is officially 48. The 'typical' variant of this has been referred to as ADH2(1) or ADH2*1 while the 'atypical' has been referred to as, e.g., ADH2(2), ADH2*2, ADH1B*48His. This SNP is associated with the risk for alcohol dependence, alcohol use disorders and alcohol consumption, with the atypical genotype having reduced risk of alcoholism. The atypical genotype produces a more active enzyme and is associated with rice domestication.

Another SNP is rs2066702 [Arg370Cys]. originally called position 369. This SNP is at high frequencies in populations from Africa, and also reduces risk for alcohol dependence.

== Role in pathology ==
A marked decrease of ADH1B mRNA was detected in corneal fibroblasts taken from persons suffering from keratoconus.

A 2019 research showed strong evidence that an individual's self-reported alcohol consumption and their genotype at rs1229984, a missense variant in ADH1B, are associated with their partner's self-reported alcohol use, finding evidence of spousal genotypic concordance for rs1229984, suggesting that spousal concordance for alcohol consumption existed prior to cohabitation.

== See also ==
- Alcohol dehydrogenase
- Aldehyde dehydrogenase
