= Alcohol flush reaction =

Effect of alcohol consumption on the human body

- Other names: Asian flush syndrome, Asian flush reaction, Asian glow, Asian red face glow
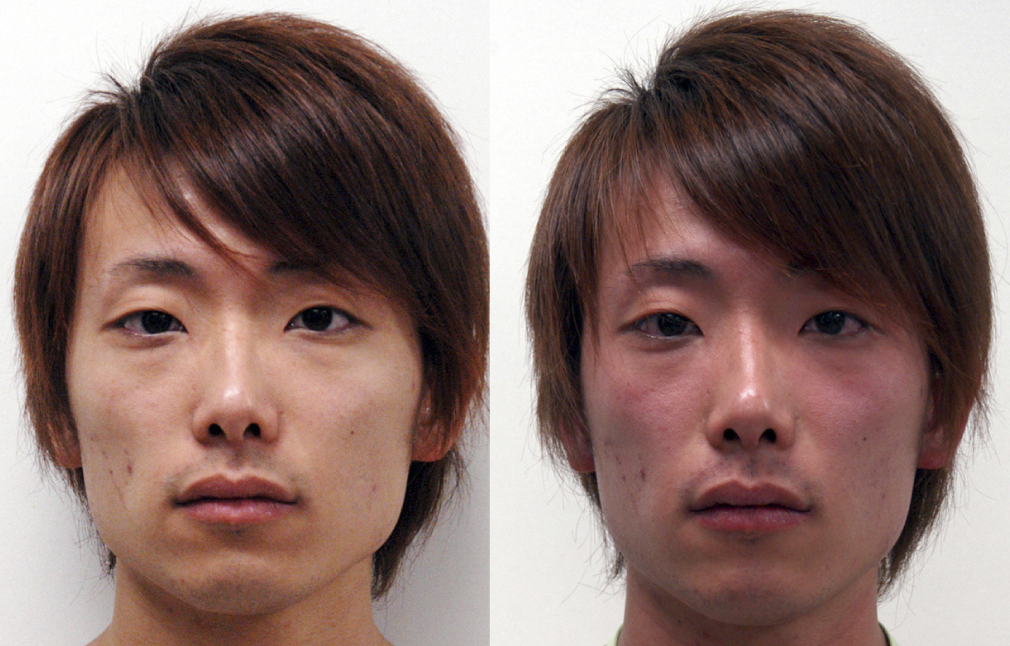
- Facial flushing. Before (left) and after (right) drinking alcohol. A 22-year-old East Asian man who is ALDH2 heterozygous showing the reaction.
- Specialty: Toxicology
- Frequency: 36% of East Asians

Alcohol flush reaction is a condition in which a person develops flushes or blotches associated with erythema on the face, neck, shoulders, ears, and in some cases, the entire body after consuming alcoholic beverages. The reaction is the result of an accumulation of acetaldehyde, a metabolic byproduct of the catabolic metabolism of alcohol, and is caused by an aldehyde dehydrogenase 2 deficiency.

This syndrome has been associated with lower than average rates of alcoholism, possibly due to its association with adverse effects after drinking alcohol. However, it has also been associated with an increased risk of esophageal cancer in those who do drink.

The reaction is informally termed Asian flush due to its frequent occurrence in East Asians, with approximately 30 to 50% of Chinese, Japanese, and Koreans showing characteristic physiological responses to drinking alcohol that includes facial flushing, nausea, headaches and a fast heart rate. The condition may be also highly prevalent in some Southeast Asian and Inuit populations.

== Signs and symptoms ==
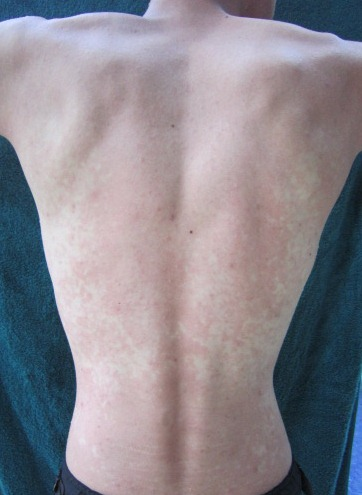
The back of an East Asian man showing alcohol flush reaction.

The most obvious symptom of alcohol flush reaction is flushing on a person's face and body after drinking alcohol. Other effects include "nausea, headache and general physical discomfort". People affected by this condition show greater reduction in psychomotor functions on alcohol consumption than those without.

Many cases of alcohol-induced respiratory reactions, which involve rhinitis and worsening of asthma, develop within 1–60 minutes of drinking alcohol and are due to the same causes as flush reactions.

Disulfiram, a drug sometimes given as treatment for alcoholism, induces effects similar to alcohol flush or hangover causing the disulfiram-alcohol reaction. It inhibits acetaldehyde dehydrogenase, causing a five-to ten-fold increase in the concentration of acetaldehyde in the body after drinking alcohol, as happens spontaneously in people subject to flush.

== Genetics ==
$\ce{H}{-} \overset{\displaystyle \ce{H} \atop |}{\underset{| \atop \displaystyle \ce{H}}{\ce C}} {-} \overset{\displaystyle \ce{H} \atop |}{\underset{| \atop \displaystyle \ce{H}}{\ce C}} \ce{-O-H ->[\ce{ADH}] H}{-} \overset{\displaystyle \ce{H} \atop |}{\underset{| \atop \displaystyle \ce{H}}{\ce C}} {-} \overset{\displaystyle \ce{H} \atop |}{\underset{\| \atop \displaystyle \ce{O}}{\ce C}} \ce{->[\ce{ALDH}] H}{-} \overset{\displaystyle \ce{H} \atop |}{\underset{| \atop \displaystyle \ce{H}}{\ce C}} {-} \overset{\color{white}{\displaystyle \ce{H} \atop |}}{\underset{\| \atop \displaystyle \ce{O}}{\ce C}} \ce{-O-H}$
Metabolism of alcohol (ethanol) to acetaldehyde (ethanal)
and then to acetic acid (ethanoic acid)

Alcohol flush reaction is a condition that is experienced more frequently by people of East Asian descent, giving rise to names such as "Asian flush" or "Asian glow".

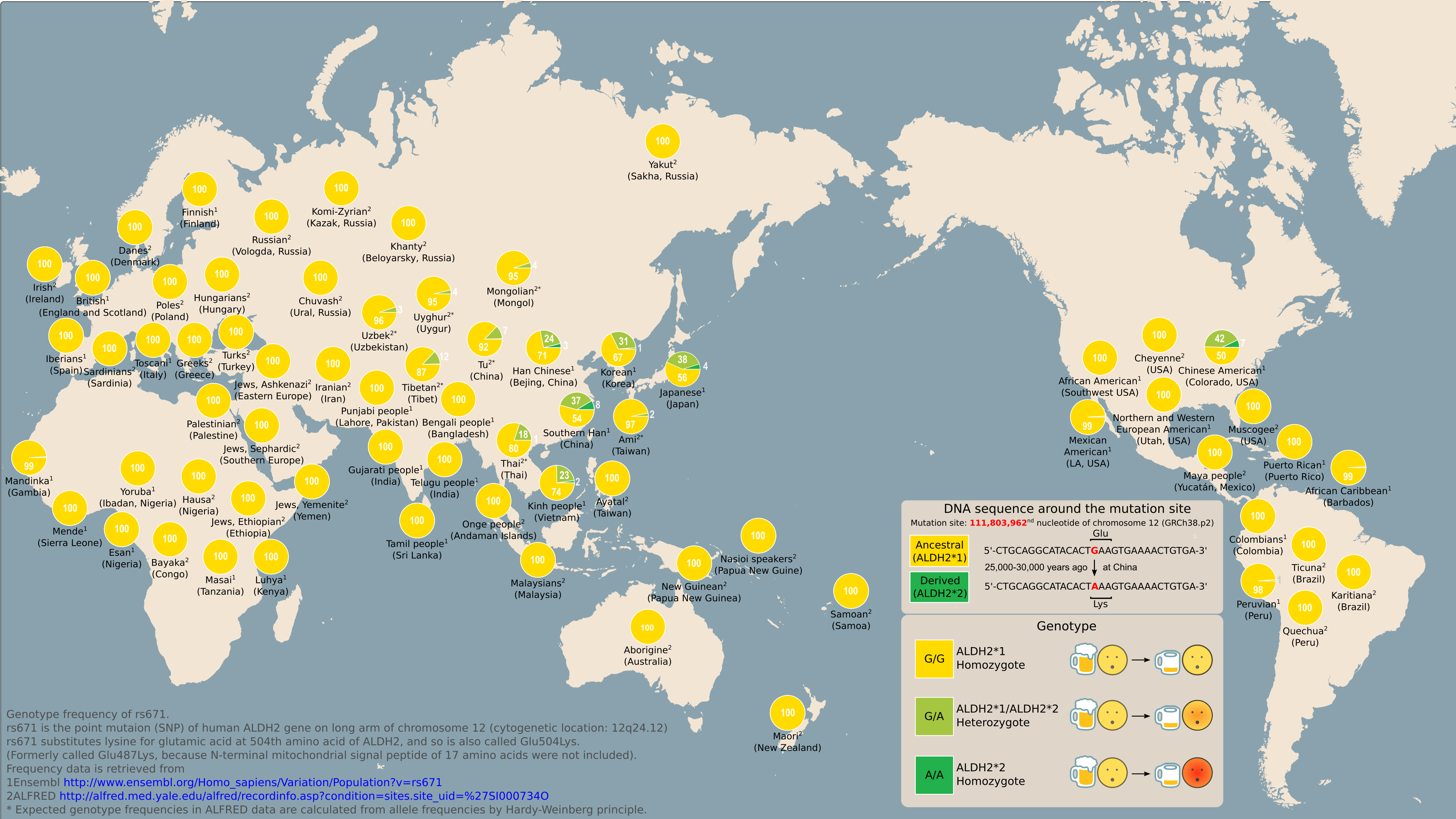
Genotype frequency distribution of ALDH2 (rs671).

Around 20–30% of East Asians carry the rs671 (ALDH2*2) allele on chromosome 12, which results in a less functional acetaldehyde dehydrogenase enzyme, responsible for the breakdown of acetaldehyde, and accounts for most incidents of alcohol flush reaction worldwide. According to the analysis by HapMap project, 20% to 30% of people of Chinese, Japanese, and Korean ancestry have at least one ALDH2*2 allele, while it is rare among Europeans and sub-Saharan Africans.

The rs671 allele is native to East Asia and most common in southeastern China. Analysis correlates the rise and spread of rice cultivation in South China with the spread of the allele. A study in China found that genes associated with the flush reaction are more common in areas with a history of rice farming than areas with a history of wheat farming or herding. The reasons for this positive selection are not known, but it has been hypothesized that elevated concentrations of acetaldehyde may have conferred protection against certain parasitic infections, such as Entamoeba histolytica.

Additionally, in around 80% of East Asians, the rapid accumulation of acetaldehyde is worsened by another gene variant; in this case the allele ADH1B*2, which results in the alcohol dehydrogenase enzyme converting alcohol to toxic acetaldehyde more quickly than other gene variants common outside East Asia.

== Pathophysiology ==
Those with facial flushing due to ALDH2 deficiency may be homozygotes, with two alleles of low activity, or heterozygotes, with one low-activity and one normal allele. Homozygotes for the trait find consumption of large amounts of alcohol to be so unpleasant that they are generally protected from esophageal cancer, but heterozygotes are able to continue drinking. Case-control studies in Japan and Taiwan have consistently found an elevated risk of esophageal squamous cell carcinoma among low-activity ALDH2 heterozygotes who drink, with odds ratios ranging from 3.7 to 18.1 after adjustment for alcohol consumption. Most studies report odds ratios above 10 in heterozygotes who are heavy drinkers.

Because most East Asians have a variant in the ADH gene, this risk is lowered somewhat because the ADH variant reduces the risk of esophageal cancer four-fold. However, ALDH2-deficient people who do not carry this ADH variant are at the highest risk of cancer as these risk factors act in a multiplicative manner through increasing exposure time to salivary acetaldehyde.

The idea that acetaldehyde is the cause of the flush is also shown by the clinical use of disulfiram (Antabuse), which blocks the removal of acetaldehyde from the body via ALDH inhibition. The high acetaldehyde concentrations described share similarity to symptoms of the flush (flushing of the skin, accelerated heart rate, shortness of breath, throbbing headache, mental confusion and blurred vision).

== Diagnosis ==
For measuring the level of flush reaction to alcohol, the most accurate method is to determine the level of acetaldehyde in the bloodstream. This can be measured through a breathalyzer test or blood test. Additionally, measuring the amount of alcohol metabolizing enzymes alcohol dehydrogenases and aldehyde dehydrogenase through genetic testing can predict the amount of reaction that one would have.

=== Differential diagnosis ===
- Alcohol-induced respiratory reactions including rhinitis and exacerbations of asthma appear, in many cases, due to the direct actions of ethanol.
- Rosacea, also known as gin blossoms, is a chronic facial skin condition in which capillaries are excessively reactive, leading to redness from flushing or telangiectasia. Rosacea has been mistakenly attributed to alcoholism because of its similar appearance to the temporary flushing of the face that often accompanies the ingestion of alcohol.
- Degreaser's flush – a flushing condition arising from consuming alcohol shortly before or during inhalation of trichloroethylene (TCE), an organic solvent with suspected carcinogenic properties.
- Carcinoid syndrome – episodes of severe flushing precipitated by alcohol, stress and certain foods. May also be associated with intense diarrhea, wheezing and weight loss.
- Red ear syndrome, thought by many to be triggered by alcohol among other causes.
- Ethanol Patch Test - Place an ethanol-soaked bandage directly on the skin for twenty minutes. The skin will turn red if positive.

== See also ==
- Alcohol and cancer
