= ADH deficiency =

ADH deficiency may refer to:

- Aldehyde dehydrogenase 2 deficiency, more commonly known as alcohol flush reaction
- Antidiuretic hormone deficiency, more commonly known as diabetes insipidus
