= Traffic Safety (book) =

Traffic Safety, ISBN 0-9754871-0-8, is a book authored by Leonard Evans, published in 2004 by the Science Serving Society of Bloomfield Hills, Michigan.

The book uses the methods of science to examine the deaths, injuries, and property damage from traffic crashes. It is more focused on public policy and countermeasures than the author's 1991 book Traffic Safety and the Driver. Results derived from many disciplines, including psychology, sociology, medicine, epidemiology, criminology, biomechanics, economics, physics, and engineering are synthesized into easily understood relationships.

== Chapter headings ==
Traffic Safety is organized as follows:

1. Introduction
2. Data sources
3. Overview of traffic fatalities
4. Vehicle mass and size
5. Environment, roadway, and vehicle
6. Gender, age, and alcohol effects on survival
7. Older drivers
8. Driver performance
9. Driver behavior
10. Alcohol
11. Occupant protection
12. Airbag benefits, airbag costs
13. Measures to improve traffic safety
14. How you can reduce your risk
15. The dramatic failure of US safety policy
16. Conclusions

== See also ==
- Traffic Safety and the Driver, by Leonard Evans
