= ADH6 =

Protein-coding gene in the species Homo sapiens

Identifiers
- Aliases: ADH6, ADH-5, alcohol dehydrogenase 6 (class V)
- External IDs: OMIM: 103735; GeneCards: ADH6
Enzyme activity
EC #	BRENDA	ExPASy	KEGG	MetaCyc
1.1.1.1	↗	↗	↗	↗

Gene location (Human)
Chr.	Chromosome 4 (human)
Band	4q23	Start	99,202,638 bp
Band	4q23	End	99,219,537 bp
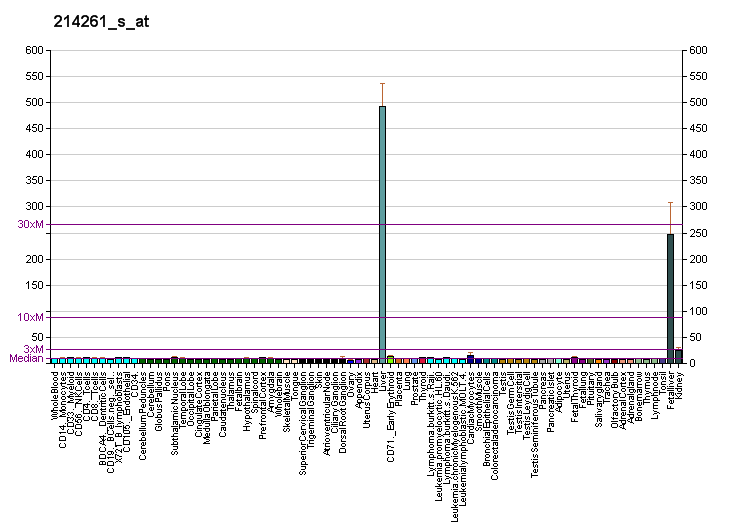

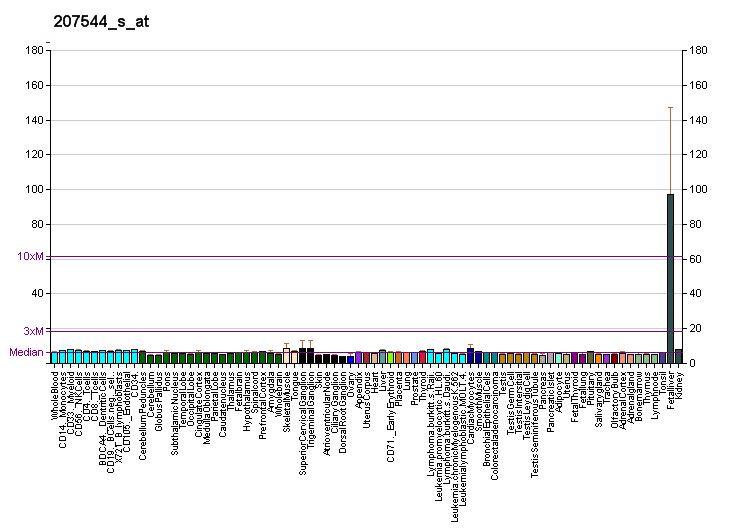
RNA expression pattern
Bgee	Human / Mouse (ortholog); Top expressed in: right lobe of liver; jejunal mucosa; kidney tubule; duodenum; pancreatic ductal cell; right uterine tube; glomerulus; metanephric glomerulus; human kidney; mucosa of transverse colon / n/a; More reference expression data
BioGPS	More reference expression data
Gene ontology
Molecular function	oxidoreductase activity; zinc ion binding; alcohol dehydrogenase (NAD+) activity; metal ion binding; alcohol dehydrogenase activity, zinc-dependent; NAD-retinol dehydrogenase activity
Cellular component	cytoplasm; cytosol; extracellular exosome
Biological process	response to ethanol; ethanol oxidation; retinol metabolic process; retinoic acid metabolic process
Sources:Amigo / QuickGO
Orthologs
Databases	NCBI: entry; OMA: entry
Species	Human	Mouse
Entrez	130	n/a
Ensembl	ENSG00000172955	n/a
UniProt	P28332	n/a
RefSeq (mRNA)	NM_000672; NM_001102470	n/a
RefSeq (protein)	NP_000663; NP_001095940	n/a
Location (UCSC)	Chr 4: 99.2 – 99.22 Mb	n/a
PubMed search		n/a
- Wikidata
View/Edit Human

Alcohol dehydrogenase 6 is an enzyme that in humans is encoded by the ADH6 gene.

This gene encodes class V alcohol dehydrogenase, which is a member of the alcohol dehydrogenase family. Members of this family metabolize a wide variety of substrates, including ethanol, retinol, other aliphatic alcohols, hydroxysteroids, and lipid peroxidation products. This gene is expressed in the stomach as well as in the liver, and it contains a glucocorticoid response element upstream of its 5' UTR, which is a steroid hormone receptor binding site. The deduced amino acid sequence of the open reading frame of this gene shows about 60% positional identity with other known alcohol dehydrogenases. This gene may have a distinct physiologic function.
