= Alcohol dehydrogenase (acceptor) =

alcohol dehydrogenase (acceptor)

Identifiers
- EC no.: 1.1.99.8
- CAS no.: 37205-43-9

Databases
- IntEnz: IntEnz view
- BRENDA: BRENDA entry
- ExPASy: NiceZyme view
- KEGG: KEGG entry
- MetaCyc: metabolic pathway
- PRIAM: profile
- PDB structures: RCSB PDB PDBe PDBsum
- Gene Ontology: AmiGO / QuickGO
Search
- PMC: articles
- PubMed: articles
- NCBI: proteins

In enzymology, an alcohol dehydrogenase (acceptor) (EC 1.1.99.8) is an enzyme that catalyzes the chemical reaction

a primary alcohol + acceptor $\rightleftharpoons$ an aldehyde + reduced acceptor

Thus, the two substrates of this enzyme are primary alcohol and acceptor, whereas its two products are aldehyde and reduced acceptor.

This enzyme belongs to the family of oxidoreductases, specifically those acting on the CH-OH group of donor with other acceptors. The systematic name of this enzyme class is alcohol:acceptor oxidoreductase. Other names in common use include primary alcohol dehydrogenase, MDH, quinohemoprotein alcohol dehydrogenase, quinoprotein alcohol dehydrogenase, quinoprotein ethanol dehydrogenase, and alcohol:(acceptor) oxidoreductase. This enzyme participates in 5 metabolic pathways: glycolysis / gluconeogenesis, 1,2-dichloroethane degradation, propanoate metabolism, butanoate metabolism, and methane metabolism. It employs one cofactor, PQQ.

== Structural studies ==
As of late 2007, 11 structures have been solved for this class of enzymes, with PDB accession codes 1G72, 1H4I, 1H4J, 1LRW, 1W6S, 2AD6, 2AD7, 2AD8, 2D0V, 4AAH, and 8ADH.

== See also ==
- Alcohol dehydrogenase
