= Traffic Safety and the Driver =

Non-fiction book by Leonard Evans

Traffic Safety and the Driver is a book authored by Leonard Evans and published in 1992.

== Reception ==
While the data presented is in some regards dated, the concepts apply now as they did then. This book has been repeatedly referred to as a classic in the fields of traffic safety, vehicle safety, and crash prevention. It has been positively reviewed by most of the world's most influential technical journals in relevant fields. Traffic Safety and the Driver is now largely eclipsed by the author's more recent book Traffic Safety, which has received similarly enthusiastic reviews.

== Chapter headings ==
The book was organized as follows:

- Introduction
- Effects of Sex and Age
- An Overview of U.S. Traffic Fatalities
- Engineering, Roadway and Environmental Factors
- Driver Performance
- Driver Behavior
- Alcohol's Role in Traffic Crashes
- Drunk Driving Countermeasures
- Effectiveness of Occupant Protection Devices When Used
- Restraint-Use Laws, Use Rates, and Field Effectiveness
- User Responses to Changes in Traffic Systems
- How You Can Reduce Your Risk
- An Attempt to Estimate the Relative Importance of Factors
- Traffic Safety in Broader Contexts
- Conclusions
