= ADH5 =

Protein-coding gene in the species Homo sapiens

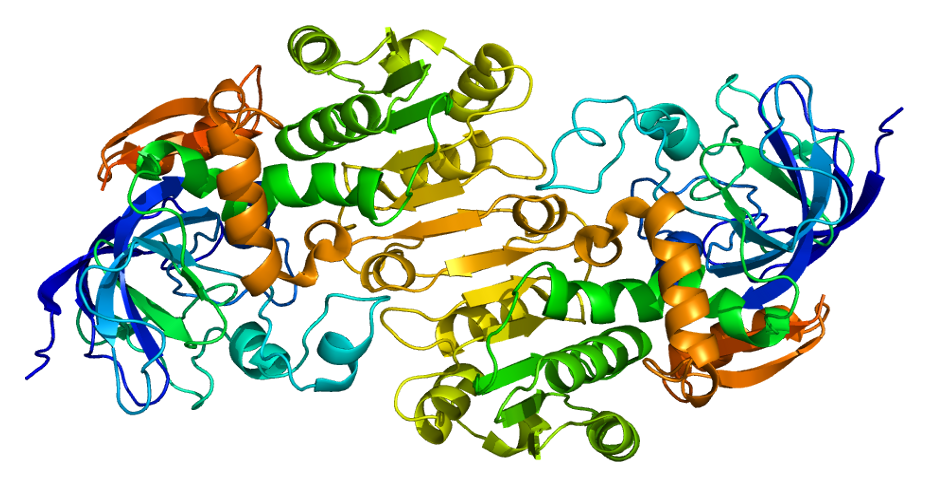

Identifiers
- Aliases: ADH5, ADH-3, ADHX, FALDH, FDH, GSH-FDH, GSNOR, HEL-S-60p, alcohol dehydrogenase 5 (class III), chi polypeptide, BMFS7, AMEDS
- External IDs: OMIM: 103710; MGI: 87929; GeneCards: ADH5
Available structures
PDB	Ortholog search: PDBe RCSB
PDB	List of PDB id codes 1M6H, 1M6W, 1MA0, 1MC5, 1MP0, 1TEH, 2FZE, 2FZW, 3QJ5
Enzyme activity
EC #	BRENDA	ExPASy	KEGG	MetaCyc
1.1.1.1	↗	↗	↗	↗
1.1.1.284	↗	↗	↗	↗

Gene location (Human)
Chr.	Chromosome 4 (human)
Band	4q23	Start	99,070,978 bp
Band	4q23	End	99,088,801 bp

Gene location (Mouse)
Chr.	Chromosome 3 (mouse)
Band	3|3 G3	Start	138,148,854 bp
Band	3|3 G3	End	138,161,260 bp
RNA expression pattern
Bgee	Human / Mouse (ortholog); Top expressed in: gastric mucosa; Descending thoracic aorta; stromal cell of endometrium; kidney tubule; corpus epididymis; ascending aorta; Achilles tendon; popliteal artery; tibial arteries; ventricular zone / Top expressed in: primitive streak; left lobe of liver; Gonadal ridge; endocardial cushion; medullary collecting duct; ureter; medial ganglionic eminence; vas deferens; olfactory epithelium; atrioventricular valve; More reference expression data
BioGPS	n/a
Gene ontology
Molecular function	protein homodimerization activity; zinc ion binding; metal ion binding; fatty acid binding; formaldehyde dehydrogenase activity; electron transfer activity; oxidoreductase activity; S-(hydroxymethyl)glutathione dehydrogenase activity; alcohol dehydrogenase (NAD+) activity; alcohol dehydrogenase activity, zinc-dependent
Cellular component	cytoplasm; cytosol; mitochondrion; extracellular exosome
Biological process	respiratory system process; retinoid metabolic process; response to redox state; positive regulation of blood pressure; response to lipopolysaccharide; peptidyl-cysteine S-nitrosylation; response to nitrosative stress; formaldehyde catabolic process; ethanol oxidation; electron transport chain
Sources:Amigo / QuickGO
Orthologs
Databases	NCBI: entry; OMA: entry
Species	Human	Mouse
Entrez	128	11532
Ensembl	ENSG00000197894	ENSMUSG00000028138
UniProt	P11766	P28474
RefSeq (mRNA)	NM_000671	NM_001288578; NM_007410
RefSeq (protein)	NP_000662	NP_001275507; NP_031436
Location (UCSC)	Chr 4: 99.07 – 99.09 Mb	Chr 3: 138.15 – 138.16 Mb
PubMed search
- Wikidata
View/Edit Human	View/Edit Mouse

Alcohol dehydrogenase class-3 is an enzyme that in humans is encoded by the ADH5 gene.

This gene encodes glutathione-dependent formaldehyde dehydrogenase or the class III alcohol dehydrogenase chi subunit, which is a member of the alcohol dehydrogenase family. Members of this family metabolize a wide variety of substrates, including ethanol, retinol, other aliphatic alcohols, hydroxysteroids, and lipid peroxidation products. Class III alcohol dehydrogenase is a homodimer composed of 2 chi subunits. It has virtually no activity for ethanol oxidation, but exhibits high activity for oxidation of long-chain primary alcohols and for oxidation of S-hydroxymethyl-glutathione, a spontaneous adduct between formaldehyde and glutathione.

This enzyme is an important component of cellular metabolism for the elimination of formaldehyde, a potent irritant and sensitizing agent that causes lacrymation, rhinitis, pharyngitis, and contact dermatitis.

== Clinical significance ==
Mutations of the ADH5 gene and ALDH2 gene cause AMED syndrome, an autosomal recessive digenic multisystem disorder characterized by global developmental delay with impaired intellectual development, short stature, growth impairment and early development of myelodysplastic syndrome and bone marrow failure. The syndrome was first described in 2020.
