= ADH7 =

Protein-coding gene in the species Homo sapiens

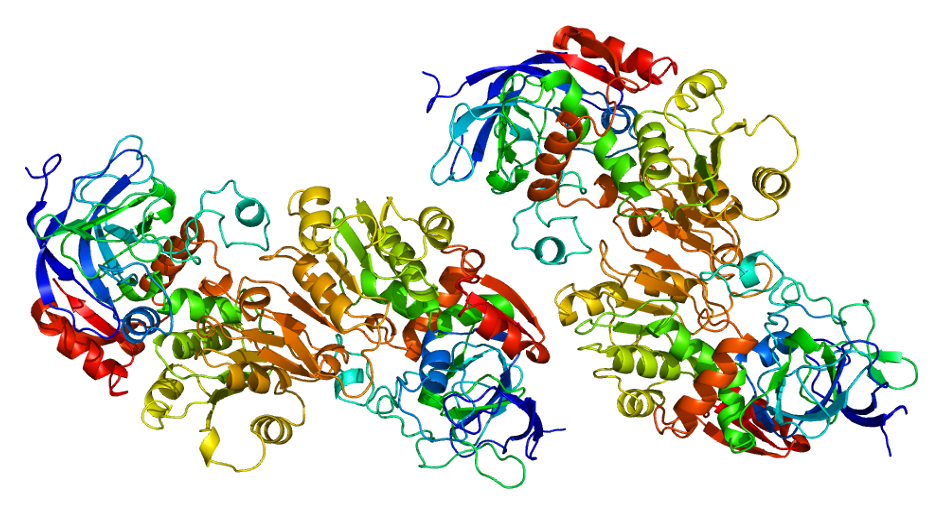

Identifiers
- Aliases: ADH7, ADH4, alcohol dehydrogenase 7 (class IV), mu or sigma polypeptide
- External IDs: OMIM: 600086; MGI: 87926; GeneCards: ADH7
Available structures
| PDB | Ortholog search: PDBe RCSB |
| PDB | List of PDB id codes 1AGN, 1D1S, 1D1T |
Enzyme activity
| EC # | BRENDA | ExPASy | KEGG | MetaCyc |
|---|---|---|---|---|
| 1.1.1.1 | ↗ | ↗ | ↗ | ↗ |
| 1.1.1.66 | ↗ | ↗ | ↗ | ↗ |
| 1.1.1.105 | ↗ | ↗ | ↗ | ↗ |

Gene location (Human)
| Chr. | Chromosome 4 (human) |
| Band | 4q23 | Start | 99,412,261 bp |
| Band | 4q23 | End | 99,435,510 bp |

Gene location (Mouse)
| Chr. | Chromosome 3 (mouse) |
| Band | 3 G3|3 64.13 cM | Start | 137,923,521 bp |
| Band | 3 G3|3 64.13 cM | End | 137,939,143 bp |
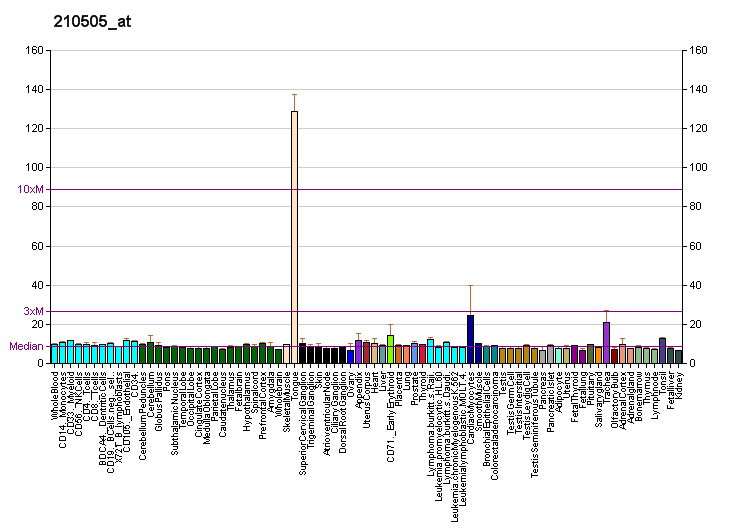
RNA expression pattern
| Bgee | Human / Mouse (ortholog); Top expressed in: olfactory zone of nasal mucosa; oral cavity; nasal epithelium; epithelium of nasopharynx; mucosa of pharynx; mucosa of paranasal sinus; gums; gingival epithelium; testicle; palpebral conjunctiva / Top expressed in: esophagus; superior surface of tongue; gastric mucosa; mucous cell of stomach; epithelium of stomach; pyloric antrum; transitional epithelium of urinary bladder; lip; corneal stroma; conjunctival fornix; More reference expression data |
| BioGPS | More reference expression data |
Gene ontology
| Molecular function | aldehyde oxidase activity; zinc ion binding; metal ion binding; NAD-retinol dehydrogenase activity; ethanol binding; retinol binding; oxidoreductase activity; receptor antagonist activity; alcohol dehydrogenase (NAD+) activity; alcohol dehydrogenase activity, zinc-dependent |
| Cellular component | cytoplasm; intracellular anatomical structure; extracellular region; cytosol; plasma membrane |
| Biological process | ethanol catabolic process; response to bacterium; retinol metabolic process; retinoic acid metabolic process; fatty acid omega-oxidation; retinoid metabolic process; response to ethanol; ethanol oxidation; extracellular negative regulation of signal transduction; negative regulation of signaling receptor activity |
Sources:Amigo / QuickGO
Orthologs
| Databases | NCBI: entry; OMA: entry |
| Species | Human | Mouse |
| Entrez | 131 | 11529 |
| Ensembl | ENSG00000196344 | ENSMUSG00000055301 |
| UniProt | P40394 | Q64437 |
| RefSeq (mRNA) | NM_001166504; NM_000673 | NM_009626 |
| RefSeq (protein) | NP_000664; NP_001159976 | NP_033756 |
| Location (UCSC) | Chr 4: 99.41 – 99.44 Mb | Chr 3: 137.92 – 137.94 Mb |
| PubMed search |
- Wikidata
| View/Edit Human | View/Edit Mouse |

Alcohol dehydrogenase class 4 mu/sigma chain is an enzyme that in humans is encoded by the ADH7 gene.

== Function ==
This gene encodes class IV alcohol dehydrogenase 7 mu or sigma subunit, which is a member of the alcohol dehydrogenase family. Members of this family metabolize a wide variety of substrates, including ethanol, retinol, other aliphatic alcohols, hydroxysteroids, and lipid peroxidation products. The enzyme encoded by this gene is inefficient in ethanol oxidation, but is the most active as a retinol dehydrogenase; thus it may participate in the synthesis of retinoic acid, a hormone important for cellular differentiation. The expression of this gene makes it much more abundant in the stomach than the liver, thus it differs from the other known gene family members.
