= Alcohol dehydrogenase (nicotinoprotein) =

Identifiers
- EC no.: 1.1.99.36

Databases
- BRENDA: enzyme data
- ExPASy: NiceZyme view
- KEGG: enzyme entry
- MetaCyc: metabolic pathway
- Rhea: reactions
- PDB structures: RCSB PDB PDBe PDBsum
Search
- PMC: articles
- PubMed: articles
- NCBI: proteins

Alcohol dehydrogenase (nicotinoprotein) (EC 1.1.99.36, NDMA-dependent alcohol dehydrogenase, nicotinoprotein alcohol dehydrogenase, np-ADH, ethanol:N,N-dimethyl-4-nitrosoaniline oxidoreductase) is an enzyme with systematic name ethanol:acceptor oxidoreductase. This enzyme catalyses the following chemical reaction

ethanol
+ electron
acceptor
acetaldehyde
+ reduced
acceptor

This enzyme contains Zn^{2+}.
