= Alcohol dehydrogenase (cytochrome c) =

Class of enzymes

Identifiers
- EC no.: 1.1.2.8

Databases
- BRENDA: enzyme data
- ExPASy: NiceZyme view
- KEGG: enzyme entry
- MetaCyc: metabolic pathway
- Rhea: reactions
- PDB structures: RCSB PDB PDBe PDBsum
Search
- PMC: articles
- PubMed: articles
- NCBI: proteins

Alcohol dehydrogenase (cytochrome c) (EC 1.1.2.8, type I quinoprotein alcohol dehydrogenase, quinoprotein ethanol dehydrogenase) is an enzyme with systematic name alcohol:cytochrome c oxidoreductase. This enzyme catalyses the following chemical reaction

a primary alcohol + 2 ferricytochrome c $\rightleftharpoons$ an aldehyde + 2 ferrocytochrome c + 2 H+

A periplasmic PQQ-containing quinoprotein is present in Pseudomonas and Rhodopseudomonas.
