= Alcohol dehydrogenase (quinone) =

Enzyme

Identifiers
- EC no.: 1.1.5.5

Databases
- BRENDA: enzyme data
- ExPASy: NiceZyme view
- KEGG: enzyme entry
- MetaCyc: metabolic pathway
- Rhea: reactions
- PDB structures: RCSB PDB PDBe PDBsum
Search
- PMC: articles
- PubMed: articles
- NCBI: proteins

Alcohol dehydrogenase (quinone) (EC 1.1.5.5, type III ADH, membrane associated quinohaemoprotein alcohol dehydrogenase) is an enzyme with systematic name alcohol:quinone oxidoreductase. This enzyme catalyses the following chemical reaction

ethanol
+ ubiquinone
acetaldehyde
+ ubiquinol

This enzyme is present in acetic acid bacteria where it is involved in acetic acid production.
