= Alcohol dehydrogenase (NAD(P)+) =

alcohol dehydrogenase [NAD(P)^{+}]

Identifiers
- EC no.: 1.1.1.71
- CAS no.: 37250-10-5

Databases
- IntEnz: IntEnz view
- BRENDA: BRENDA entry
- ExPASy: NiceZyme view
- KEGG: KEGG entry
- MetaCyc: metabolic pathway
- PRIAM: profile
- PDB structures: RCSB PDB PDBe PDBsum
- Gene Ontology: AmiGO / QuickGO
Search
- PMC: articles
- PubMed: articles
- NCBI: proteins

In enzymology, an alcohol dehydrogenase [NAD(P)^{+}] (EC 1.1.1.71) is an enzyme that catalyzes the chemical reaction

an alcohol + NAD(P)^{+} $\rightleftharpoons$ an aldehyde + NAD(P)H + H^{+}

The two substrates of this enzyme are an alcohol, and either NAD^{+} or NADP^{+}. Its products are the corresponding aldehyde, reduced cofactor and a proton.

This enzyme belongs to the family of oxidoreductases, specifically those acting on the CH-OH group of donor with NAD^{+} or NADP^{+} as acceptor. The systematic name of this enzyme class is alcohol:NAD(P)^{+} oxidoreductase. Other names in common use include retinal reductase, aldehyde reductase (NADPH/NADH), and alcohol dehydrogenase [NAD(P)]. This enzyme participates in glycolysis and gluconeogenesis.

== See also ==
- Alcohol dehydrogenase
