= Alcohol dehydrogenase (azurin) =

Identifiers
- EC no.: 1.1.9.1

Databases
- IntEnz: IntEnz view
- BRENDA: BRENDA entry
- ExPASy: NiceZyme view
- KEGG: KEGG entry
- MetaCyc: metabolic pathway
- PRIAM: profile
- PDB structures: RCSB PDB PDBe PDBsum
Search
- PMC: articles
- PubMed: articles
- NCBI: proteins

Alcohol dehydrogenase (azurin) (EC 1.1.9.1, type II quinoprotein alcohol dehydrogenase, quinohaemoprotein ethanol dehydrogenase, QHEDH, ADHIIB) is an enzyme with systematic name alcohol:azurin oxidoreductase. This enzyme catalyses the following chemical reaction

primary alcohol + azurin $\rightleftharpoons$ aldehyde + reduced azurin

This enzyme is a periplasmic PQQ-containing quinohemoprotein.
