= ADHFE1 =

Protein-coding gene in the species Homo sapiens

An Error has occurred retrieving Wikidata item for infobox Alcohol dehydrogenase, iron containing 1 is a protein that in humans is encoded by the ADHFE1 gene.

== Function ==
The ADHFE1 gene encodes hydroxyacid-oxoacid transhydrogenase (EC 1.1.99.24), which is responsible for the oxidation of 4-hydroxybutyrate in mammalian tissues.
