= Methylene green =

Names
- IUPAC name [7-(dimethylamino)-4-nitrophenothiazin-3-ylidene]-dimethylazanium chloride
- Other names Basic Green 5; CI 52020

Identifiers
CAS Number	2679-01-8
3D model (JSmol)	Interactive image
ChemSpider	68394
ECHA InfoCard	100.018.392
MeSH	C028673
PubChem CID	75889
UNII	F1IO2ZP7BU
CompTox Dashboard (EPA)	DTXSID70949598
- InChI: InChI=1S/C16H17N4O2S.ClH/c1-18(2)10-5-6-11-14(9-10)23-16-12(17-11)7-8-13(19(3)4)15(16)20(21)22;/h5-9H,1-4H3;1H/q+1;/p-1 Key: YYGBVRCTHASBKD-UHFFFAOYSA-M; InChI=1/C16H17N4O2S.ClH/c1-18(2)10-5-6-11-14(9-10)23-16-12(17-11)7-8-13(19(3)4)15(16)20(21)22;/h5-9H,1-4H3;1H/q+1;/p-1 Key: YYGBVRCTHASBKD-REWHXWOFAG
- SMILES: O=[N+](c1c([s+]c(cc(N(C)C)cc2)c2n3)c3ccc1N(C)C)[O-].[Cl-]

Properties
Chemical formula	C_{16}H_{17}ClN_{4}O_{2}S
Molar mass	364.85 g/mol
- Except where otherwise noted, data are given for materials in their standard state (at 25 °C [77 °F], 100 kPa). verify (what is ?) Infobox references

Methylene green is a heterocyclic aromatic chemical compound similar to methylene blue. It is used as a dye. It functions as a visible light-activated photocatalyst in organic synthesis.
