= 1,3-propanediol dehydrogenase =

Class of enzymes

Identifiers
- EC no.: 1.1.1.202
- CAS no.: 81611-70-3

Databases
- BRENDA: enzyme data
- ExPASy: NiceZyme view
- KEGG: enzyme entry
- MetaCyc: metabolic pathway
- Rhea: reactions
- PDB structures: RCSB PDB PDBe PDBsum
- Gene Ontology: AmiGO / QuickGO
Search
- PMC: articles
- PubMed: articles
- NCBI: proteins

In enzymology, a 1,3-propanediol dehydrogenase (EC 1.1.1.202) is an enzyme that catalyzes the chemical reaction

propane-1,3-diol + NAD^{+} $\rightleftharpoons$ 3-hydroxypropanal + NADH + H^{+}

Thus, the two substrates of this enzyme are propane-1,3-diol and NAD^{+}, whereas its 3 products are 3-hydroxypropanal, NADH, and H^{+}.

This enzyme belongs to the family of oxidoreductases, specifically those acting on the CH-OH group of donor with NAD^{+} or NADP^{+} as acceptor. The systematic name of this enzyme class is propane-1,3-diol:NAD^{+} 1-oxidoreductase. Other names in common use include 3-hydroxypropionaldehyde reductase, 1,3-PD:NAD^{+} oxidoreductase, 1,3-propanediol:NAD^{+} oxidoreductase, and 1,3-propanediol dehydrogenase. This enzyme participates in ether lipid metabolism as a step in glycerolipid biosynthesis.
