= ADH4 =

Protein-coding gene in the species Homo sapiens

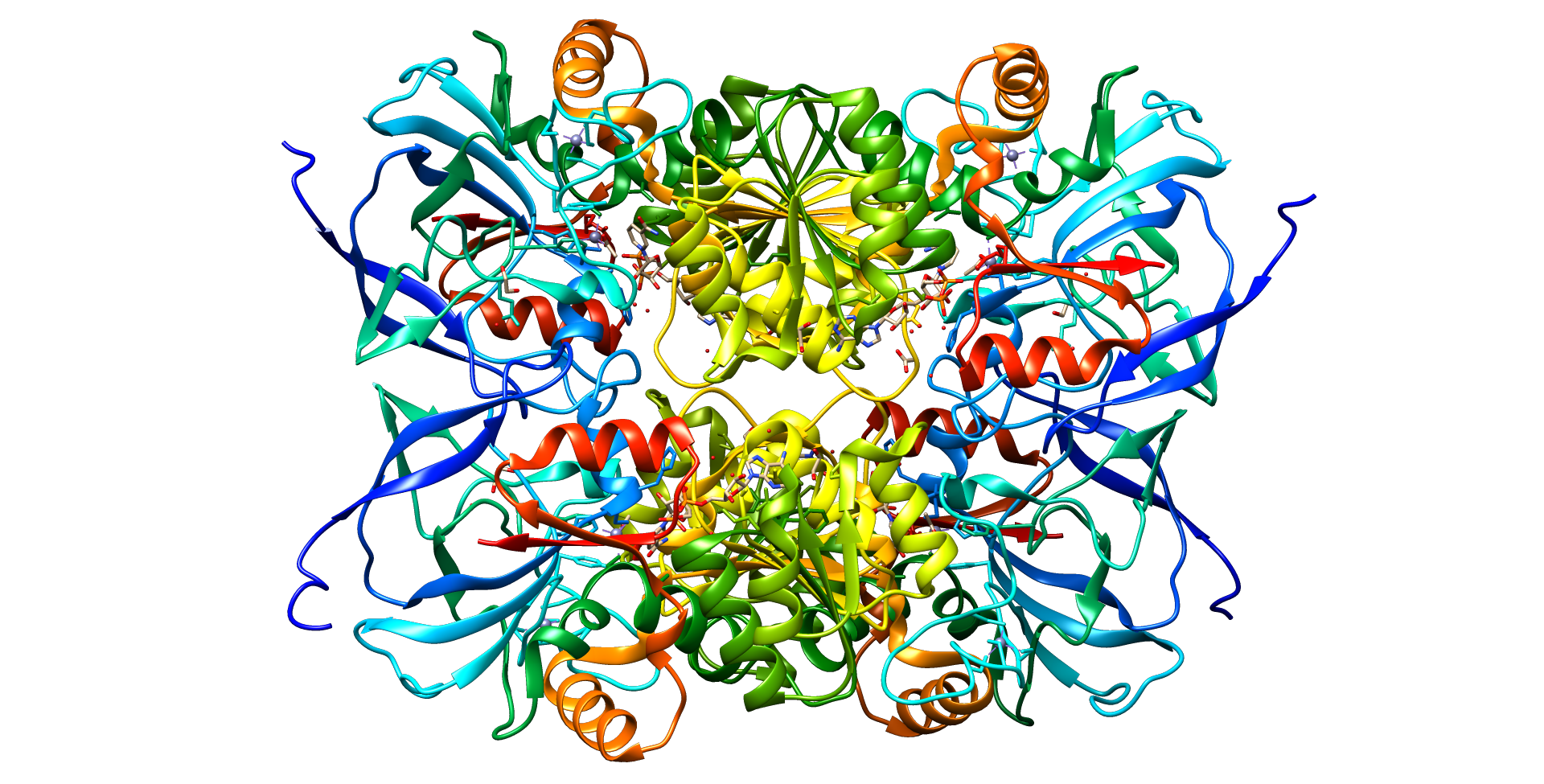

Identifiers
- Aliases: ADH4, ADH-2, HEL-S-4, alcohol dehydrogenase 4 (class II), pi polypeptide
- External IDs: OMIM: 103740; MGI: 1349472; GeneCards: ADH4
Available structures
PDB	Ortholog search: PDBe RCSB
PDB	List of PDB id codes 3COS
Enzyme activity
EC #	BRENDA	ExPASy	KEGG	MetaCyc
1.1.1.105	↗	↗	↗	↗

Gene location (Human)
Chr.	Chromosome 4 (human)
Band	4q23	Start	99,123,657 bp
Band	4q23	End	99,157,792 bp

Gene location (Mouse)
Chr.	Chromosome 3 (mouse)
Band	3|3 G3	Start	138,121,227 bp
Band	3|3 G3	End	138,136,653 bp
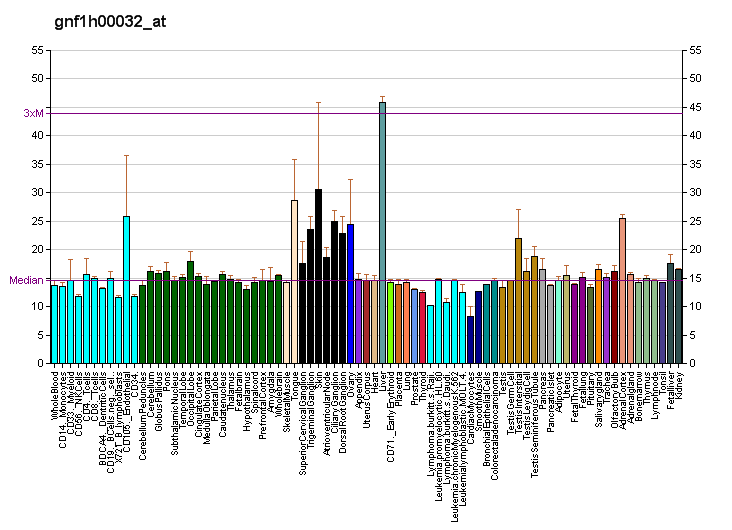
RNA expression pattern
Bgee	Human / Mouse (ortholog); Top expressed in: jejunal mucosa; right lobe of liver; duodenum; buccal mucosa cell; sperm; cerebellar vermis; cardia; pylorus; body of tongue; external globus pallidus / Top expressed in: left lobe of liver; duodenum; spermatocyte; spermatid; zona reticularis; jejunum; interventricular septum; morula; seminiferous tubule; adrenal cortex; More reference expression data
BioGPS	More reference expression data
Gene ontology
Molecular function	benzaldehyde dehydrogenase [NAD(P)+ activity]; all-trans retinal binding; NADPH:quinone reductase activity; alditol:NADP+ 1-oxidoreductase activity; NAD binding; zinc ion binding; metal ion binding; oxidoreductase activity, acting on the aldehyde or oxo group of donors, NAD or NADP as acceptor; retinol binding; oxidoreductase activity; alcohol dehydrogenase (NAD+) activity; alcohol dehydrogenase activity, zinc-dependent; NAD-retinol dehydrogenase activity; ethanol binding; S-(hydroxymethyl)glutathione dehydrogenase activity
Cellular component	cytoplasm; nucleus; cytosol
Biological process	quinone metabolic process; retinol metabolic process; retinoid metabolic process; cellular aldehyde metabolic process; alcohol catabolic process; ethanol metabolic process; alcohol metabolic process; ethanol oxidation; formaldehyde catabolic process
Sources:Amigo / QuickGO
Orthologs
Databases	NCBI: entry; OMA: entry
Species	Human	Mouse
Entrez	127	26876
Ensembl	ENSG00000198099	ENSMUSG00000037797
UniProt	P08319	Q9QYY9
RefSeq (mRNA)	NM_000670; NM_001306171; NM_001306172	NM_011996
RefSeq (protein)	NP_000661; NP_001293100; NP_001293101	NP_036126
Location (UCSC)	Chr 4: 99.12 – 99.16 Mb	Chr 3: 138.12 – 138.14 Mb
PubMed search
- Wikidata
View/Edit Human	View/Edit Mouse

Alcohol dehydrogenase 4 is an enzyme that in humans is encoded by the ADH4 gene.

This gene encodes class II alcohol dehydrogenase 4 pi subunit, which is a member of the alcohol dehydrogenase family. Members of this enzyme family metabolize a wide variety of substrates, including ethanol, retinol, other aliphatic alcohols, hydroxysteroids, and lipid peroxidation products. Class II alcohol dehydrogenase is a homodimer composed of 2 pi subunits. It exhibits a high activity for oxidation of long-chain aliphatic alcohols and aromatic alcohols and is less sensitive to pyrazole. This gene is localized to chromosome 4 in the cluster of alcohol dehydrogenase genes.

There is evidence that ancestors of modern humans developed the ADH4 producing gene some 10 million years ago. This probably helped them to take advantage of rotting fruit as they shifted to a terrestrial lifestyle.
