= 4-Hydroxybutyrate dehydrogenase =

Class of enzymes

4-hydroxybutyrate dehydrogenase
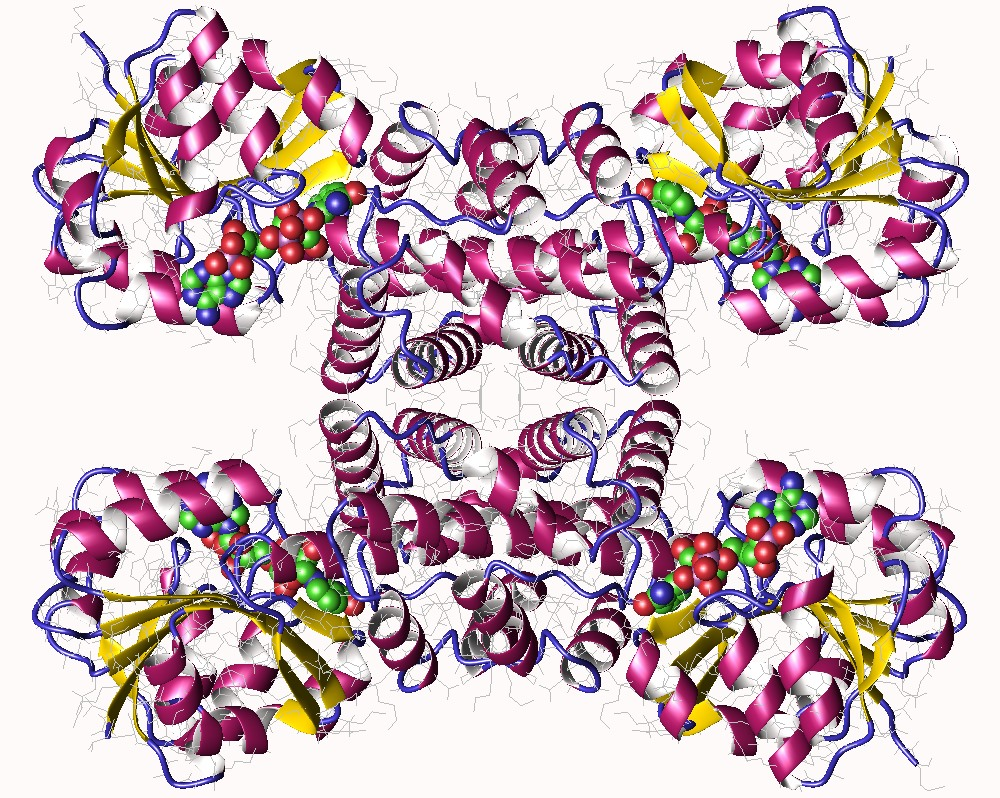

Identifiers
- EC no.: 1.1.1.61

Databases
- IntEnz: IntEnz view
- BRENDA: BRENDA entry
- ExPASy: NiceZyme view
- KEGG: KEGG entry
- MetaCyc: metabolic pathway
- PRIAM: profile
- PDB structures: RCSB PDB PDBe PDBsum
- Gene Ontology: AmiGO / QuickGO
Search
- PMC: articles
- PubMed: articles
- NCBI: proteins

In enzymology, a 4-hydroxybutyrate dehydrogenase (EC 1.1.1.61) is an enzyme that catalyzes the chemical reaction

4-Hydroxybutyric acid
+ NAD^{+}
H^{+}
H^{+}
Succinic semialdehyde
+ NADH

The two substrates of this enzyme are 4-hydroxybutanoic acid, and oxidised nicotinamide adenine dinucleotide (NAD^{+}). Its products are succinic semialdehyde, reduced NADH, and a proton.

This enzyme belongs to the family of oxidoreductases, specifically those acting on the CH-OH group of donor with NAD^{+} or NADP^{+} as acceptor. The systematic name of this enzyme class is 4-hydroxybutanoate:NAD^{+} oxidoreductase. This enzyme is also called gamma-hydroxybutyrate dehydrogenase. This enzyme participates in butanoate metabolism and the degradation of the neurotransmitter 4-hydroxybutanoic acid.
