= Alcohol dehydrogenase =

Group of dehydrogenase enzymes

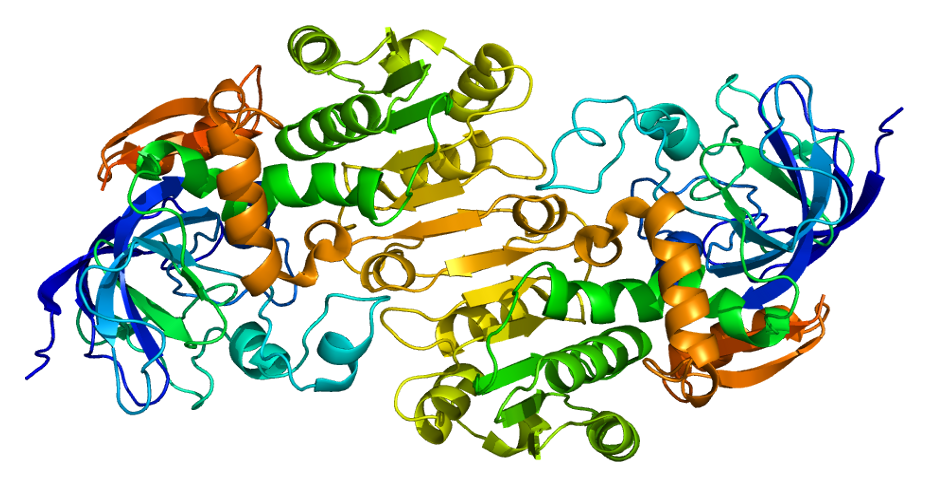
- Crystallographic structure of the homodimer of human ADH5.

Identifiers
- EC no.: 1.1.1.1
- CAS no.: 9031-72-5

Databases
- BRENDA: enzyme data
- ExPASy: NiceZyme view
- KEGG: enzyme entry
- MetaCyc: metabolic pathway
- Rhea: reactions
- PDB structures: RCSB PDB PDBe PDBsum
- Gene Ontology: AmiGO / QuickGO
Search
- PMC: articles
- PubMed: articles
- NCBI: proteins

Alcohol dehydrogenases (ADH) (EC 1.1.1.1) are a group of dehydrogenase enzymes that occur in many organisms and facilitate the interconversion between alcohols and aldehydes or ketones with the reduction of nicotinamide adenine dinucleotide (NAD^{+}) to NADH. In humans and many other animals, they serve to break down alcohols that are otherwise toxic, and they also participate in the generation of useful aldehyde, ketone, or alcohol groups during the biosynthesis of various metabolites. In yeast, plants, and many bacteria, some alcohol dehydrogenases catalyze the opposite reaction as part of fermentation to ensure a constant supply of NAD^{+}.

== Evolution ==
Genetic evidence from comparisons of multiple organisms showed that a glutathione-dependent formaldehyde dehydrogenase, identical to a class III alcohol dehydrogenase (ADH-3/ADH5), is presumed to be the ancestral enzyme for the entire ADH family. Early on in evolution, an effective method for eliminating both endogenous and exogenous formaldehyde was important and this capacity has conserved the ancestral ADH-3 through time. Gene duplication of ADH-3, followed by series of mutations, led to the evolution of other ADHs.

The ability to produce ethanol from sugar (which is the basis of how alcoholic beverages are made) is believed to have initially evolved in yeast. Though this feature is not adaptive from an energy point of view, by making alcohol in such high concentrations so that they would be toxic to other organisms, yeast cells could effectively eliminate their competition. Since rotting fruit can contain more than 4% of ethanol, animals eating the fruit needed a system to metabolize exogenous ethanol. This was thought to explain the conservation of ethanol active ADH in species other than yeast, though ADH-3 is now known to also have a major role in nitric oxide signaling.

In humans, sequencing of the ADH1B gene (responsible for production of an alcohol dehydrogenase polypeptide) shows several functional variants. In one, there is a SNP (single nucleotide polymorphism) that leads to either a Histidine or an Arginine residue at position 47 in the mature polypeptide. In the Histidine variant, the enzyme is much more effective at the aforementioned conversion. The enzyme responsible for the conversion of acetaldehyde to acetate, however, remains unaffected, which leads to differential rates of substrate catalysis and causes a buildup of toxic acetaldehyde, causing cell damage. This provides some protection against excessive alcohol consumption and alcohol dependence (alcoholism). Various haplotypes arising from this mutation are more concentrated in regions near Eastern China, a region also known for its low alcohol tolerance and dependence.

A study was conducted in order to find a correlation between allelic distribution and alcoholism, and the results suggest that the allelic distribution arose along with rice cultivation in the region between 12,000 and 6,000 years ago. In regions where rice was cultivated, rice was also fermented into ethanol. This led to speculation that increased alcohol availability led to alcoholism and abuse, resulting in lower reproductive fitness. Those with the variant allele have little tolerance for alcohol, thus lowering chance of dependence and abuse. The hypothesis posits that those individuals with the Histidine variant enzyme were sensitive enough to the effects of alcohol that differential reproductive success arose and the corresponding alleles were passed through the generations. Classical Darwinian evolution would act to select against the detrimental form of the enzyme (Arg variant) because of the lowered reproductive success of individuals carrying the allele. The result would be a higher frequency of the allele responsible for the His-variant enzyme in regions that had been under selective pressure the longest. The distribution and frequency of the His variant follows the spread of rice cultivation to inland regions of Asia, with higher frequencies of the His variant in regions that have cultivated rice the longest. The geographic distribution of the alleles seems to therefore be a result of natural selection against individuals with lower reproductive success, namely, those who carried the Arg variant allele and were more susceptible to alcoholism. However, the persistence of the Arg variant in other populations argues that the effect could not be strong.

== Discovery ==
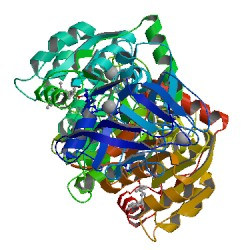
Horse LADH (Liver Alcohol Dehydrogenase)

The enzyme was first found by Detlev Müller in 1933. The first-ever isolated alcohol dehydrogenase (ADH) was purified in 1937 from Saccharomyces cerevisiae (brewer's yeast). Many aspects of the catalytic mechanism for the horse liver ADH enzyme were investigated by Hugo Theorell and coworkers. ADH was also one of the first oligomeric enzymes that had its amino acid sequence and three-dimensional structure determined.

In early 1960, the alcohol dehydrogenase (ADH) gene was discovered in fruit flies of the genus Drosophila melanogaster. Flies that are mutant for ADH cannot breakdown alcohols into aldehydes and ketones. While ethanol produced by decaying fruit is a natural food source and location for oviposit for Drosophila at low concentrations (<4%), high concentrations of ethanol can induce oxidative stress and alcohol intoxication. Drosophila's fitness is elevated by consuming the low concentration of ethanol. Initial exposure to ethanol causes hyperactivity, followed by incoordination and sedation. Further research has shown that the antioxidant alpha-ketoglutarate may be beneficial in reducing the oxidative stress produced by alcohol consumption. A 2016 study concluded that food supplementation with 10-mM alpha-ketoglutarate decreased Drosophila alcohol sensitivity over time. For the gene that codes for ADH, there are 194 known classic and insertion alleles. Two alleles that are commonly used for experimentation involving ethanol toxicity and response are ADH^{s} (slow) and ADH^{F} (fast). Numerous experiments have concluded that the two alleles account for the differences in enzymatic activity for each. In comparing Adh-F homozygotes (wild-type) and Adh- nulls (homozygous null), research has shown that Adh- nulls have a lower level of tolerance for ethanol, starting the process of intoxication earlier than its counter partner. Other experiments have also concluded that the Adh allele is haplosufficient. Haplosuffiency means that having one functioning allele will be adequate in producing the needed phenotypes for survival. That means that flies that were heterozygous for the Adh allele (one copy of the Adh null allele and one copy of the Adh Wild type allele) gave very similar phenotypical alcohol tolerance as the homozygous dominant flies (two copies of the wild type Adh allele). Regardless of genotype, Drosophila show a negative response to exposure to samples with an ethanol content above 5%, which render any tolerance inadequate, resulting in a lethal dosage and a mortality rate of around 70%. Drosophila show many of the same ethanol responses as humans do. Low doses of ethanol produce hyperactivity, moderate doses incoordination, and high doses sedation.

== Properties ==
The alcohol dehydrogenases comprise a group of several isozymes that catalyse the oxidation of primary and secondary alcohols to aldehydes and ketones, respectively, and also can catalyse the reverse reaction. In mammals this is a redox (reduction/oxidation) reaction involving the coenzyme nicotinamide adenine dinucleotide (NAD^{+}).

== Mechanism of action in humans ==
=== Steps ===
1. Binding of the coenzyme NAD^{+}
2. Binding of the alcohol substrate by coordination to zinc(II) ion
3. Deprotonation of His-51
4. Deprotonation of nicotinamide ribose
5. Deprotonation of Thr-48
6. Deprotonation of the alcohol
7. Hydride transfer from the alkoxide ion to NAD^{+}, leading to NADH and a zinc-bound aldehyde or ketone
8. Release of aldehyde.

The mechanism in yeast and bacteria is the reverse of this reaction. These steps are supported through kinetic studies.

=== Involved subunits ===
The substrate is coordinated to the zinc and this enzyme has two zinc atoms per subunit. One is the active site, which is involved in catalysis. In the active site, the ligands are Cys-46, Cys-174, His-67, and one water molecule. The other subunit is involved with structure. In this mechanism, the hydride from the alcohol goes to NAD^{+}. Crystal structures indicate that the His-51 deprotonates the nicotinamide ribose, which deprotonates Ser-48. Finally, Ser-48 deprotonates the alcohol, making it an aldehyde. From a mechanistic perspective, if the enzyme adds hydride to the re face of NAD^{+}, the resulting hydrogen is incorporated into the pro-R position. Enzymes that add hydride to the re face are deemed Class A dehydrogenases.

== Active site ==
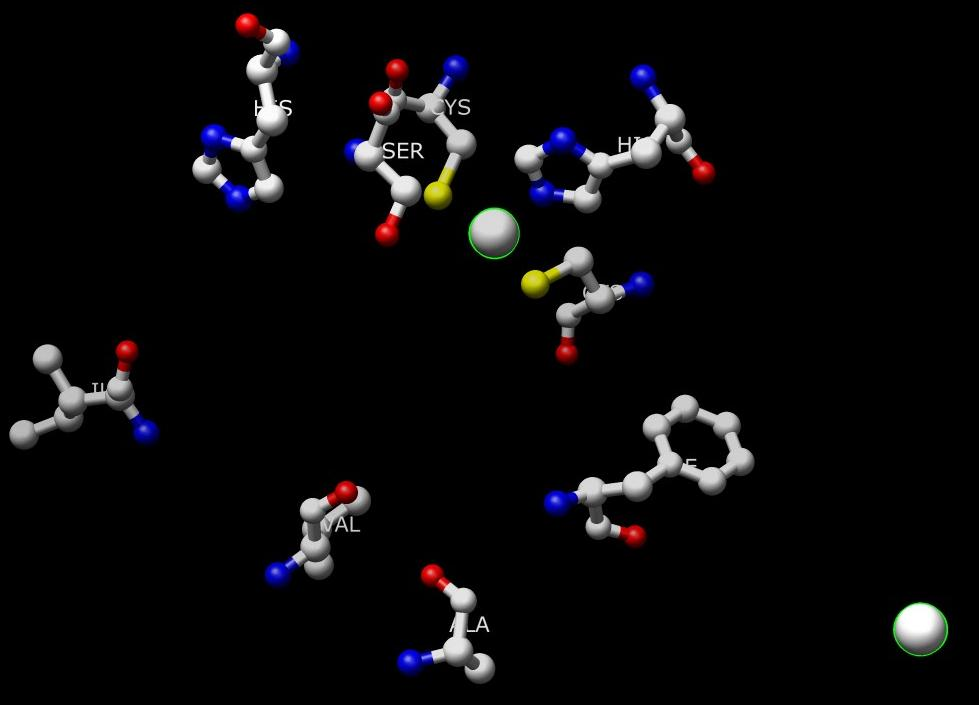
The active site of alcohol dehydrogenase

The active site of human ADH1 (PDB:1HSO) consists of a zinc atom, His-67, Cys-174, Cys-46, Thr-48, His-51, Ile-269, Val-292, Ala-317, and Phe-319. In the commonly studied horse liver isoform, Thr-48 is a Ser, and Leu-319 is a Phe. The zinc coordinates the substrate (alcohol). The zinc is coordinated by Cys-46, Cys-174, and His-67. Leu-319, Ala-317, His-51, Ile-269 and Val-292 stabilize NAD^{+} by forming hydrogen bonds. His-51 and Ile-269 form hydrogen bonds with the alcohols on nicotinamide ribose. Phe-319, Ala-317 and Val-292 form hydrogen bonds with the amide on NAD^{+}.

== Structural zinc site ==
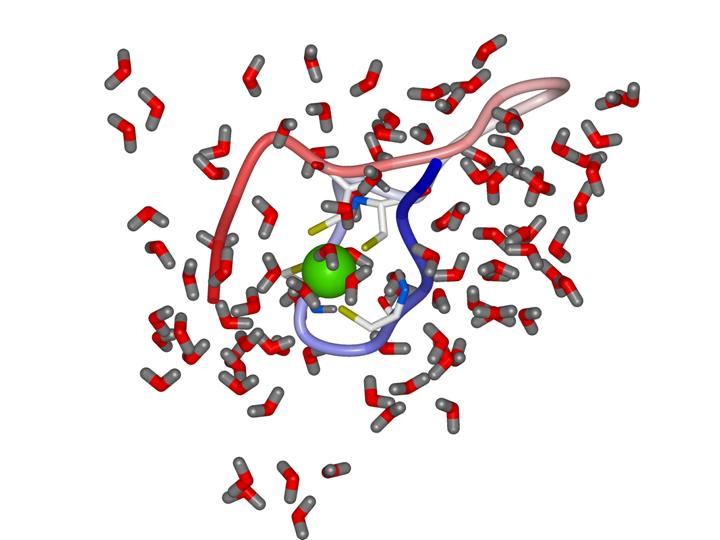
The structural zinc binding motif in alcohol dehydrogenase from an MD simulation

Mammalian alcohol dehydrogenases also have a structural zinc site. This Zn ion plays a structural role and is crucial for protein stability. The structures of the catalytic and structural zinc sites in horse liver alcohol dehydrogenase (HLADH) as revealed in crystallographic structures, which has been studied computationally with quantum chemistry as well as with classical molecular dynamics methods. The structural zinc site is composed of four closely spaced cysteine ligands (Cys97, Cys100, Cys103, and Cys111 in the amino acid sequence) positioned in an almost symmetric tetrahedron around the Zn ion. A recent study showed that the interaction between zinc and cysteine is governed by primarily an electrostatic contribution with an additional covalent contribution to the binding.

== Types ==
=== Human ===
In humans, ADH exists in multiple forms as a dimer and is encoded by at least seven genes. Among the five classes (I-V) of alcohol dehydrogenase, the hepatic forms that are used primarily in humans are class 1. Class 1 consists of α, β, and γ subunits that are encoded by the genes ADH1A, ADH1B, and ADH1C. The enzyme is present at high levels in the liver and the lining of the stomach. It catalyzes the oxidation of ethanol to acetaldehyde (ethanal):

CH_{3}CH_{2}OH + NAD^{+} → CH_{3}CHO + NADH + H^{+}

This allows the consumption of alcoholic beverages, but its evolutionary purpose is probably the breakdown of alcohols naturally contained in foods or produced by bacteria in the digestive tract.

Another evolutionary purpose is reversible metabolism of retinol (vitamin A), an alcohol, to retinaldehyde, also known as retinal, which is then irreversibly converted into retinoic acid, which regulates expression of hundreds of genes.

alcohol dehydrogenase 1A, α polypeptide

Identifiers
- Symbol: ADH1A
- Alt. symbols: ADH1
- NCBI gene: 124
- HGNC: 249
- OMIM: 103700
- RefSeq: NM_000667
- UniProt: P07327

Other data
- EC number: 1.1.1.1
- Locus: Chr. 4 q23
Search for
- Structures: Swiss-model
- Domains: InterPro

alcohol dehydrogenase 1B, β polypeptide

Identifiers
- Symbol: ADH1B
- Alt. symbols: ADH2
- NCBI gene: 125
- HGNC: 250
- OMIM: 103720
- RefSeq: NM_000668
- UniProt: P00325

Other data
- EC number: 1.1.1.1
- Locus: Chr. 4 q23
Search for
- Structures: Swiss-model
- Domains: InterPro

alcohol dehydrogenase 1C, γ polypeptide

Identifiers
- Symbol: ADH1C
- Alt. symbols: ADH3
- NCBI gene: 126
- HGNC: 251
- OMIM: 103730
- RefSeq: NM_000669
- UniProt: P00326

Other data
- EC number: 1.1.1.1
- Locus: Chr. 4 q23
Search for
- Structures: Swiss-model
- Domains: InterPro

Alcohol dehydrogenase is also involved in the toxicity of other types of alcohol: For instance, it oxidizes methanol to produce formaldehyde and ultimately formic acid. Humans have at least six slightly different alcohol dehydrogenases. Each is a dimer (i.e., consists of two polypeptides), with each dimer containing two zinc ions Zn^{2+}. One of those ions is crucial for the operation of the enzyme: It is located at the catalytic site and holds the hydroxyl group of the alcohol in place.

Alcohol dehydrogenase activity varies between men and women, between young and old, and among populations from different areas of the world. For example, young women are unable to process alcohol at the same rate as young men because they do not express the alcohol dehydrogenase as highly, although the inverse is true among the middle-aged. The level of activity may not be dependent only on level of expression but also on allelic diversity among the population.

The human genes that encode class II, III, IV, and V alcohol dehydrogenases are ADH4, ADH5, ADH7, and ADH6, respectively.

alcohol dehydrogenase 4 (class II), π polypeptide

Identifiers
- Symbol: ADH4
- NCBI gene: 127
- HGNC: 252
- OMIM: 103740
- RefSeq: NM_000670
- UniProt: P08319

Other data
- EC number: 1.1.1.1
- Locus: Chr. 4 q22
Search for
- Structures: Swiss-model
- Domains: InterPro

alcohol dehydrogenase 5 (class III), χ polypeptide

Identifiers
- Symbol: ADH5
- NCBI gene: 128
- HGNC: 253
- OMIM: 103710
- RefSeq: NM_000671
- UniProt: P11766

Other data
- EC number: 1.1.1.1
- Locus: Chr. 4 q23
Search for
- Structures: Swiss-model
- Domains: InterPro

alcohol dehydrogenase 6 (class V)

Identifiers
- Symbol: ADH6
- NCBI gene: 130
- HGNC: 255
- OMIM: 103735
- RefSeq: NM_000672
- UniProt: P28332

Other data
- EC number: 1.1.1.1
- Locus: Chr. 4 q23
Search for
- Structures: Swiss-model
- Domains: InterPro

alcohol dehydrogenase 7 (class IV), μ or σ polypeptide

Identifiers
- Symbol: ADH7
- NCBI gene: 131
- HGNC: 256
- OMIM: 600086
- RefSeq: NM_000673
- UniProt: P40394

Other data
- EC number: 1.1.1.1
- Locus: Chr. 4 q23-q24
Search for
- Structures: Swiss-model
- Domains: InterPro

=== Yeast and bacteria ===
Unlike humans, yeast and bacteria (except lactic acid bacteria, and E. coli in certain conditions) do not ferment glucose to lactate. Instead, they ferment it to ethanol and CO_{2}. The overall reaction can be seen below:

Glucose + 2 ADP + 2 Pi → 2 ethanol + 2 CO_{2} + 2 ATP + 2 H_{2}O

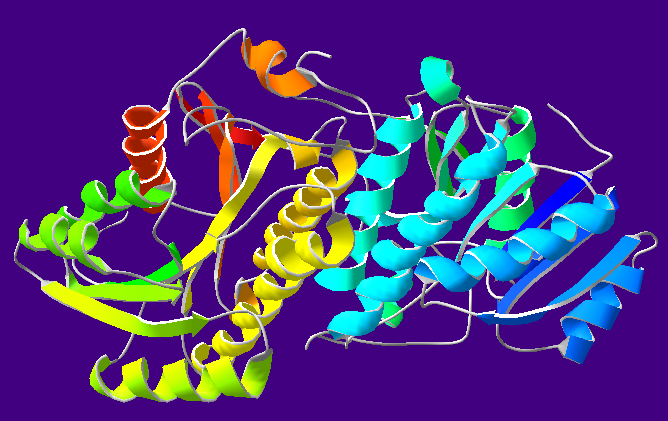
Alcohol Dehydrogenase

In yeast and many bacteria, alcohol dehydrogenase plays an important part in fermentation: Pyruvate resulting from glycolysis is converted to acetaldehyde and carbon dioxide, and the acetaldehyde is then reduced to ethanol by an alcohol dehydrogenase called ADH1. The purpose of this latter step is the regeneration of NAD^{+}, so that the energy-generating glycolysis can continue. Humans exploit this process to produce alcoholic beverages, by letting yeast ferment various fruits or grains. Yeast can produce and consume their own alcohol.

The main alcohol dehydrogenase in yeast is larger than the human one, consisting of four rather than just two subunits. It also contains zinc at its catalytic site. Together with the zinc-containing alcohol dehydrogenases of animals and humans, these enzymes from yeasts and many bacteria form the family of "long-chain"-alcohol dehydrogenases.

Brewer's yeast also has another alcohol dehydrogenase, ADH2, which evolved out of a duplicate version of the chromosome containing the ADH1 gene. ADH2 is used by the yeast to convert ethanol back into acetaldehyde, and it is expressed only when sugar concentration is low. Having these two enzymes allows yeast to produce alcohol when sugar is plentiful (and this alcohol then kills off competing microbes), and then continue with the oxidation of the alcohol once the sugar, and competition, is gone.

=== Plants ===
In plants, ADH catalyses the same reaction as in yeast and bacteria to ensure that there is a constant supply of NAD^{+}. Maize has two versions of ADH – ADH1 and ADH2, Arabidopsis thaliana contains only one ADH gene. The structure of Arabidopsis ADH is 47%-conserved, relative to ADH from horse liver. Structurally and functionally important residues, such as the seven residues that provide ligands for the catalytic and noncatalytic zinc atoms, however, are conserved, suggesting that the enzymes have a similar structure. ADH is constitutively expressed at low levels in the roots of young plants grown on agar. If the roots lack oxygen, the expression of ADH increases significantly. Its expression is also increased in response to dehydration, to low temperatures, and to abscisic acid, and it plays an important role in fruit ripening, seedlings development, and pollen development. Differences in the sequences of ADH in different species have been used to create phylogenies showing how closely related different species of plants are. It is an ideal gene to use due to its convenient size (2–3 kb in length with a ≈1000 nucleotide coding sequence) and low copy number.

=== Iron-containing ===
Iron-containing alcohol dehydrogenase
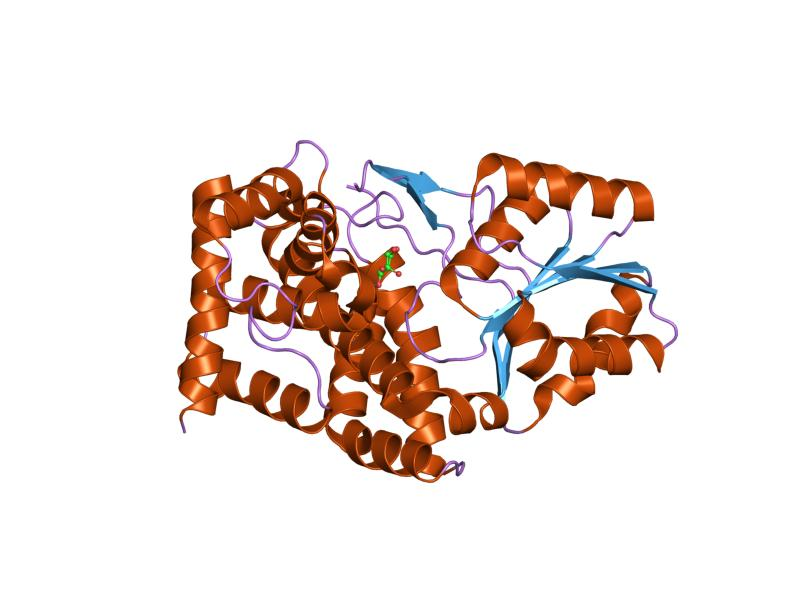
- bacillus stearothermophilus glycerol dehydrogenase complex with glycerol

Identifiers
- Symbol: Fe-ADH
- Pfam: PF00465
- Pfam clan: CL0224
- InterPro: IPR001670
- PROSITE: PDOC00059
- SCOP2: 1jqa / SCOPe / SUPFAM
Available protein structures:
- PDB: IPR001670 PF00465 (ECOD; PDBsum)
- AlphaFold: IPR001670; PF00465

A third family of alcohol dehydrogenases, unrelated to the above two, are iron-containing ones. They occur in bacteria and fungi. In comparison to enzymes of the above families, these enzymes are oxygen-sensitive. Members of the iron-containing alcohol dehydrogenase family include:

- Saccharomyces cerevisiae alcohol dehydrogenase 4 (gene ADH4)
- Zymomonas mobilis alcohol dehydrogenase 2 (gene adhB)
- Escherichia coli propanediol oxidoreductase EC 1.1.1.77 (gene fucO), an enzyme involved in the metabolism of fucose and which also seems to contain ferrous ion(s).
- Clostridium acetobutylicum NADPH- and NADH-dependent butanol dehydrogenases EC 1.1.1.- (genes adh1, bdhA and bdhB), enzymes that have activity using butanol and ethanol as substrates.
- E. coli adhE, an iron-dependent enzyme that harbours three different activities: alcohol dehydrogenase, acetaldehyde dehydrogenase (acetylating) EC 1.2.1.10 and pyruvate-formate-lyase deactivase.
- Bacterial glycerol dehydrogenase EC 1.1.1.6 (gene gldA or dhaD).
- Clostridium kluyveri NAD-dependent 4-hydroxybutyrate dehydrogenase (4hbd) EC 1.1.1.61
- Citrobacter freundii and Klebsiella pneumoniae 1,3-propanediol dehydrogenase EC 1.1.1.202 (gene dhaT)
- Bacillus methanolicus NAD-dependent methanol dehydrogenase EC 1.1.1.244
- E. coli and Salmonella typhimurium ethanolamine utilization protein eutG.
- E. coli hypothetical protein yiaY.

=== Other types ===
A further class of alcohol dehydrogenases belongs to quinoenzymes and requires quinoid cofactors (e.g., pyrroloquinoline quinone, PQQ) as enzyme-bound electron acceptors. A typical example for this type of enzyme is methanol dehydrogenase of methylotrophic bacteria.

== Applications ==
Alcohol dehydrogenases are often used for the synthesis of enantiomerically pure stereoisomers of chiral alcohols. Often, high chemo- and enantioselectivity can be achieved. One example is the alcohol dehydrogenase from Lactobacillus brevis (LbADH), which is described to be a versatile biocatalyst. The high chemospecificity has been confirmed also in the case of substrates presenting two potential redox sites. For instance cinnamaldehyde presents both aliphatic double bond and aldehyde function. Unlike conventional catalysts, alcohol dehydrogenases are able to selectively act only on the latter, yielding exclusively cinnamyl alcohol.

In fuel cells, alcohol dehydrogenases can be used to catalyze the breakdown of fuel for an ethanol fuel cell. Scientists at Saint Louis University have used carbon-supported alcohol dehydrogenase with poly(methylene green) as an anode, with a nafion membrane, to achieve about 50 μA/cm^{2}.

In 1949, E. Racker defined one unit of alcohol dehydrogenase activity as the amount that causes a change in optical density of 0.001 per minute under the standard conditions of assay. Recently, the international definition of enzymatic unit (E.U.) has been more common: one unit of Alcohol Dehydrogenase will convert 1.0 μmole of ethanol to acetaldehyde per minute at pH 8.8 at 25 °C.

== Clinical significance ==
=== Alcoholism ===
There have been studies showing that variations in ADH that influence ethanol metabolism have an impact on the risk of alcohol dependence. The strongest effect is due to variations in ADH1B that increase the rate at which alcohol is converted to acetaldehyde. One such variant is most common in individuals from East Asia and the Middle East, another is most common in individuals from Africa. Both variants reduce the risk for alcoholism, but individuals can become alcoholic despite that. Researchers have tentatively detected a few other genes to be associated with alcoholism, and know that there must be many more remaining to be found. Research continues in order to identify the genes and their influence on alcoholism.

=== Drug dependence ===
Drug dependence is another problem associated with ADH, which researchers think might be linked to alcoholism. One particular study suggests that drug dependence has seven ADH genes associated with it, however, more research is necessary. Alcohol dependence and other drug dependence may share some risk factors, but because alcohol dependence is often comorbid with other drug dependences, the association of ADH with the other drug dependencies may not be causal.

=== Poisoning ===
Fomepizole, a drug that competitively inhibits alcohol dehydrogenase, can be used in the setting of acute methanol or ethylene glycol toxicity. This prevents the conversion of the methanol or ethylene glycol to its toxic metabolites (such as formic acid, formaldehyde, or glycolate). The same effect is also sometimes achieved with ethanol, again by competitive inhibition of ADH.

=== Drug metabolism ===
The drug hydroxyzine is broken down into its main metabolite cetirizine by alcohol dehydrogenase. Other drugs with alcohol groups may be metabolized in a similar way as long as steric hindrance does not prevent the alcohol from reaching the active site. A study reported that a gut microbial AdhE can also metabolize metformin. AdhE from Eubacterium hallii was shown to directly bind and enzymatically inactivate metformin, reducing intestinal and systemic drug exposure and contributing to reduced therapeutic response in type 2 diabetes.

== See also ==
- Alcohol dehydrogenase (NAD(P)+)
- Aldehyde dehydrogenase
- Oxidoreductase
- Blood alcohol content for rates of metabolism
- Alcoholic beverage
