= Hydroxysteroid =

Class of chemical compounds

Pregnenolone, an example of a hydroxysteroid.

A hydroxysteroid is a molecule derived from a steroid with a hydrogen replaced with a hydroxy group. When the hydroxy group is specifically at the C3 position, hydroxysteroids are referred to as sterols, with an example being cholesterol.

== See also ==
- Hydroxysteroid dehydrogenase
- Ketosteroid
