= ADH1A =

Protein-coding gene in the species Homo sapiens

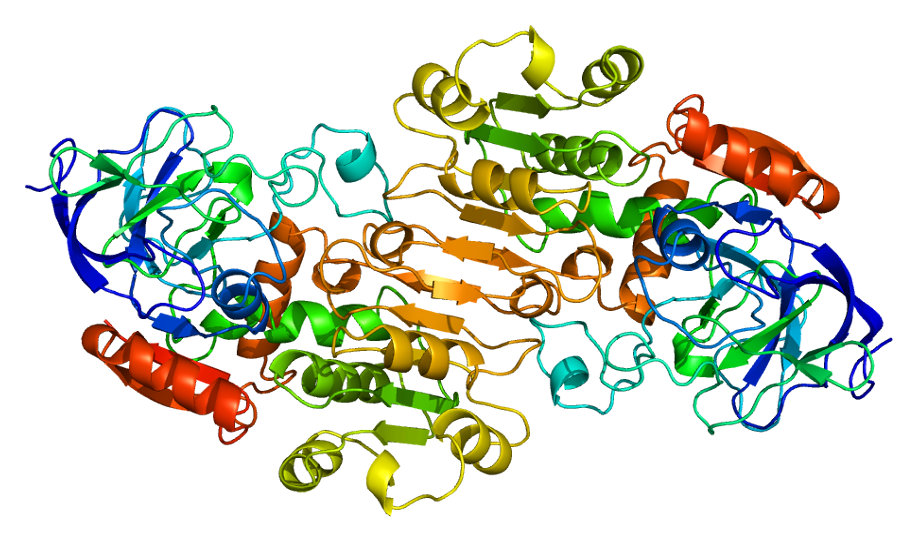

Identifiers
- Aliases: ADH1A, ADH1, alcohol dehydrogenase 1A (class I), alpha polypeptide
- External IDs: OMIM: 103700; MGI: 87921; GeneCards: ADH1A
Available structures
PDB	Ortholog search: PDBe RCSB
PDB	List of PDB id codes 1HSO, 1U3T
Enzyme activity
EC #	BRENDA	ExPASy	KEGG	MetaCyc
1.1.1.1	↗	↗	↗	↗

Gene location (Human)
Chr.	Chromosome 4 (human)
Band	4q23	Start	99,276,369 bp
Band	4q23	End	99,291,003 bp

Gene location (Mouse)
Chr.	Chromosome 3 (mouse)
Band	3 G3|3 64.16 cM	Start	137,966,752 bp
Band	3 G3|3 64.16 cM	End	137,996,459 bp
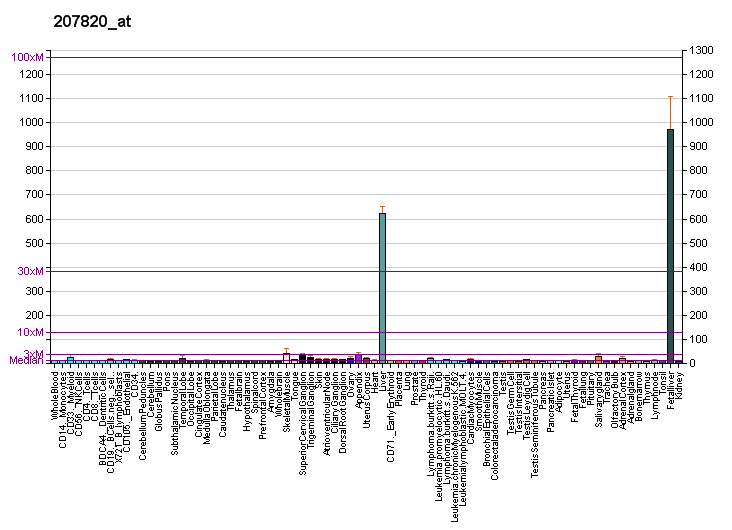
RNA expression pattern
Bgee	Human / Mouse (ortholog); Top expressed in: right lobe of liver; testicle; Descending thoracic aorta; gallbladder; right coronary artery; right lung; subcutaneous adipose tissue; left coronary artery; duodenum; ascending aorta / Top expressed in: conjunctival fornix; left lung lobe; transitional epithelium of urinary bladder; left colon; adrenal gland; left lobe of liver; gallbladder; seminal vesicula; efferent ductule; right kidney; More reference expression data
BioGPS	More reference expression data
Gene ontology
Molecular function	oxidoreductase activity; zinc ion binding; protein binding; alcohol dehydrogenase (NAD+) activity; metal ion binding; alcohol dehydrogenase activity, zinc-dependent; NAD-retinol dehydrogenase activity
Cellular component	cytoplasm; nucleoplasm; cytosol; plasma membrane
Biological process	alcohol metabolic process; ethanol oxidation; retinol metabolic process; retinoic acid metabolic process
Sources:Amigo / QuickGO
Orthologs
Databases	NCBI: entry; OMA: entry
Species	Human	Mouse
Entrez	124	11522
Ensembl	ENSG00000187758	ENSMUSG00000074207
UniProt	P07327	P00329
RefSeq (mRNA)	NM_000667	NM_007409
RefSeq (protein)	NP_000658	NP_031435
Location (UCSC)	Chr 4: 99.28 – 99.29 Mb	Chr 3: 137.97 – 138 Mb
PubMed search
- Wikidata
View/Edit Human	View/Edit Mouse

Alcohol dehydrogenase 1A is an enzyme that in humans is encoded by the ADH1A gene.

This gene encodes class I alcohol dehydrogenase, alpha subunit, which is a member of the alcohol dehydrogenase family. Members of this enzyme family metabolize a wide variety of substrates, including ethanol, retinol, other aliphatic alcohols, hydroxysteroids, and lipid peroxidation products. Class I alcohol dehydrogenase, consisting of several homo- and heterodimers of alpha, beta, and gamma subunits, exhibits high activity for ethanol oxidation and plays a major role in ethanol catabolism. Three genes encoding alpha, beta and gamma subunits are tandemly organized in a genomic segment as a gene cluster. This gene is monomorphic and predominant in fetal and infant livers, whereas the genes encoding beta and gamma subunits are polymorphic and strongly expressed in adult livers.
