= Ethanol (disambiguation) =

Ethanol is a chemical and intoxicant with the formula C_{2}H_{5}OH.

- Ethanol (data page)

Ethanol may also refer to:

- For ethanol specifically as a drug, see alcohol (drug)
- Ethanol fuel, used to power vehicles
