= Auto-brewery syndrome =

Medical condition in which the gut produces excess alcohol

- Other names: Gut fermentation syndrome, endogenous ethanol fermentation
- Digestive system
- Specialty: Gastroenterology, toxicology

Auto-brewery syndrome (ABS) (also known as gut fermentation syndrome or endogenous ethanol fermentation) is an extremely rare and underdiagnosed medical condition characterized by the fermentation of ingested carbohydrates in the gastrointestinal tract caused by bacteria or fungi.

Intoxicating amounts of ethanol are produced through endogenous fermentation within the digestive system. The organisms responsible for ABS include various yeasts and bacteria, including Saccharomyces cerevisiae, S. boulardii, Candida albicans, C. tropicalis, P. kudriavzevii, N. glabratus, C. parapsilosis, Kluyveromyces marxianus, Klebsiella pneumoniae, and Enterococcus faecium. These organisms undergo lactic acid fermentation or mixed acid fermentation pathways to produce an ethanol end product. The ethanol generated from these pathways is absorbed in the small intestine and stomach, raising blood alcohol concentrations and causing the effects of intoxication without the ingestion of alcohol.

Researchers suggest the underlying causes of ABS are related to prolonged antibiotic use, poor nutrition, and/or diets high in carbohydrates, and to pre-existing conditions such as diabetes and genetic variations that result in improper liver enzyme activity. Any of these conditions, alone or in combination, could cause ABS, and result in dysbiosis of the microbiome.

Other variants include urinary ABS and oral ABS, when fermentation occurs in the urinary bladder and mouth, rather than the gut. Urinary ABS is asymptomatic and does not produce intoxicating effects because it occurs outside the digestive tract, therefore individuals who may have it are less likely to seek medical advice. This condition still presents legal challenges, since urinary tests are often used to confirm sobriety in cases of suspected drunk driving.

Claims of endogenous fermentation have been attempted as a defense against drunk driving charges, some of which have been successful, though the condition is so rare and under-researched they are currently not substantiated by available studies.

== Signs and symptoms ==
People with this condition typically experience signs of ethanol intoxication, including slurring of speech, incoordination, memory loss, and cognitive disturbances unusual for them. Some report a fruity or foul smell from their breath.

Acute symptoms associated with ABS may include blood alcohol content of 200 to 500 mg/dL (43 to 108 mmol/L) . Mood changes and other neurological problems, including memory loss or brain fog have also been reported.

Chronic symptoms may include fatigue, liver cirrhosis, fatty-liver disease, and symptoms similar to irritable bowel syndrome. Secondary symptoms may include anxiety, depression, or relationship troubles.

== Risk factors ==
Certain clinical conditions such as type 2 diabetes mellitus and liver cirrhosis have been identified as producing higher levels of endogenous ethanol. Patients with short bowel syndrome, diabetes mellitus, Crohn's disease, liver cirrhosis, small intestinal bacterial overgrowth, gastroparesis, and immunocompromised individuals may be at greater risk of developing ABS.

An extensive history of a diet high in ultra-processed food and use of antibiotics has been significantly associated with the disease. Processed food is typically high in sugar, a type of carbohydrate, allowing the fermenting organisms to flourish. Diet composition more broadly may influence ethanol production by altering the availability of fermentable substrate in the gut. Carbohydrate-rich diets provide fermentable sugars that can increase gut ethanol production by microorganisms, such as Saccharomyces cerevisiae. In contrast, ketogenic diets may limit ethanol production due to reduced substrate availability, while high-protein diets support more moderate levels of fermentation. These patterns are consistent with metabolic modeling of certain fermentative organisms, which predict increased ethanol production in high-glucose environments. It is believed antibiotics disrupt bacterial populations, allowing yeast species to proliferate and produce ethanol.

== Metabolic action ==
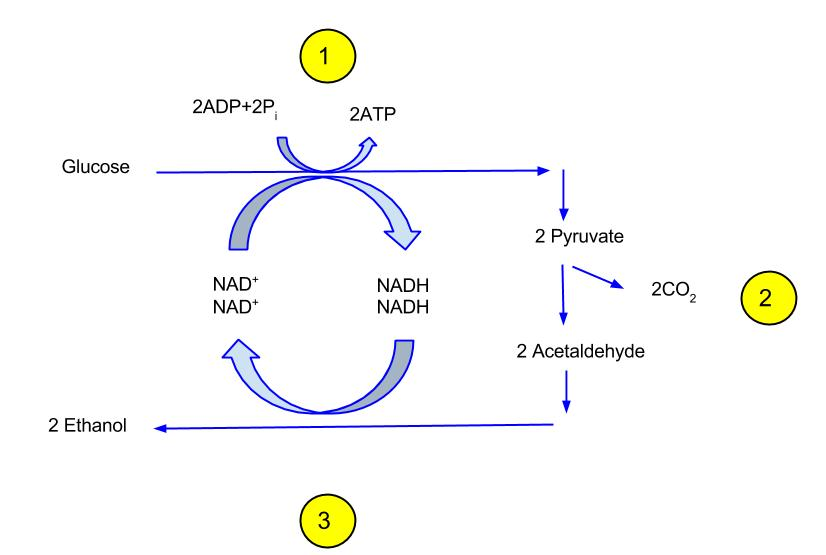
Ethanol fermentation cycle

Fermentation is a biochemical process during which yeast and certain bacteria convert sugars to ethanol and carbon dioxide, as well as other metabolic byproducts. The fermentation pathway involves pyruvate formed from yeast in the EMP pathway, while some bacteria obtain pyruvate through the ED pathway. Pyruvate is then decarboxylated to acetaldehyde in a reaction involving the enzyme pyruvate decarboxylase. Reduction of acetaldehyde to ethanol produces NAD^{+}, which is catalyzed by alcohol dehydrogenase (ADH). ADH removes alcohol from the body through a process called first pass metabolism. However, if the rate of ethanol breakdown is less than the rate of production, intoxication ensues.

== Differential diagnosis ==
When considering diagnosis of auto-brewery syndrome, clinicians attempt to rule out other factors that can cause similar symptoms, including head injuries, hypoglycemia, psychiatric disorders, seizure disorders, and hidden drinking behaviors.

== Diagnosis ==
Diagnosis of ABS may take up to three weeks. Clinicians obtain a thorough patient history, blood work, and a physical exam to rule out other potential causes. Patients seeking diagnoses can expect themselves and family members to be asked about the frequency and duration of symptoms, other medical diagnoses, and any reported drinking behavior.

A 24-hour carbohydrate challenge test may be done to validate findings. To do this, patients consume 200g of carbohydrates and are periodically monitored for a rise in blood alcohol concentration. Patients are continually supervised to rule out the chance of alcohol consumption.

Additional testing may include an upper and lower endoscopy to determine what bacterial and fungal cultures are present in the GI tract, and to test for sensitivity.

== Treatment ==
If patients present with signs and symptoms of acute alcohol poisoning, they will likely be treated according to specific protocols, ensuring the patient is in stable condition. This may include glucose monitoring and fluid administration with an IV drip.

Once someone is diagnosed with ABS, major lifestyle changes are recommended to protect the patient and reduce the occurrence and severity of symptoms. This may include adopting a diet low in carbohydrates (<5 g / day), consuming probiotic supplements, managing stress levels, and avoiding the use of antibiotics unless necessary. A reduction or cessation from consuming ultra-processed foods is generally recommended.

Patients are recommended to exercise caution before driving, especially after consuming carbohydrates, to reduce the chance of intoxicated driving.

Some patients may benefit from antifungal medication including fluconazole or nystatin, though its effectiveness varies. Often, probiotics are given concurrently to ensure proper species of bacteria recolonize the gut, and to prevent recolonization by the problematic microorganisms.

Fecal microbiota transplantation (FMT) is a new potential treatment for ABS, though additional research is required to establish its safety and effectiveness.

== History ==
Origins of ABS entered the medical literature in 1887 in the book, Lectures on auto-intoxication in disease, or, Self-poisoning of the individual, by Charles Bouchard, a French physician. He first discussed intestinal microbial fermentation and harmful effects of absorbed fermentation products, but did not discuss the modern understanding of the condition itself.

ABS entered the medical lens in 1948, with the case of a 5-year-old African boy, when his stomach ruptured after consuming sweet potatoes, suspected from immense gas produced from gut microorganisms. In an autopsy report, the clinician reported the penetrating odor of alcohol, despite the child never consuming any.

In 1983, Japanese researchers described two case studies resembling symptoms of ABS and noted 37 additional reports with similar symptoms. However, the term auto-brewery syndrome was not yet mentioned.

Throughout the late 20th century, the condition became more widely recognized with mounting case study publications and research on endogenous fermentation.

In the present, the condition is well-established, though often underdiagnosed due to its extreme rarity and resemblance to alcohol intoxication from consumption. Physicians may not include ABS in their differential diagnosis because it is unfamiliar or the presentation mimics signs of more common conditions.

The condition has been depicted in popular media including on the television shows Grey's Anatomy and The Good Doctor. Mark Mongiardo started a TikTok channel in 2025 after controlling his condition with weeks of antifungal medication and a carb-free diet.

== Medicolegal ==
Auto-brewery syndrome presents a challenging situation in the field of forensic medicine. Numerous cases of driving under the influence (DUI) have been reported in individuals with ABS, where individuals have claimed they had not consumed any alcohol. Since the disease is largely underdiagnosed, with most patients' blood alcohol content (BAC) rarely exceeding the normal limit, patients are often recommended to exercise caution when deciding to drive, and to closely monitor their carbohydrate intake.

== Case studies ==
In 2019, a 25-year-old man presented with symptoms consistent with alcohol intoxication, including dizziness, slurred speech and nausea. He had no prior alcoholic drinks but had a blood alcohol level of 0.3 g/dL. The patient was given 100 mg of the antifungal fluconazole daily for 3 weeks, and his symptoms were resolved.

In 2004, a 44-year-old male was treated with the antibiotics clavulanic acid and amoxicillin for an unrelated condition. Eight days after being discharged, he returned to the emergency room with abdominal pain and belching and was in a state of confusion. An esophagogastroscopy showed the presence of S. cerevisiae and C. albicans in his gastric fluid, causing endogenous ethanol production.

Reported in 2001, a 13-year-old girl with short gut syndrome suddenly developed symptoms of intoxication after eating "excess carbohydrates and juices". She had no access to alcohol any time the symptoms were present. Her small intestine was colonized by two organisms: C. glabrata and S. cerevisiae. She was treated with fluconazole and her symptoms resolved.

A case of urinary fermentation of carbohydrates by endogenous microorganisms leading to urinary ethanol has been reported. This single reported case is associated with diabetes due to the presence of sugar in the urine for the yeast to ferment. The person did not develop symptoms of intoxication, but did test positive in the urine for alcohol. Fermentation may continue after the urine is expressed, resulting in it developing an odor resembling wine.

Presentations at the American College of Gastroenterology's 2025 meeting included a case series of 22 patients and another of 34 patients.

== See also ==
- Diabetic ketoacidosis
- Hyperthyroidism
- Long-term effects of alcohol
- Metabolic dysfunction–associated steatotic liver disease
- Pheochromocytoma
- Small intestinal bacterial overgrowth
