= Ethanol-induced non-lamellar phases in phospholipids =

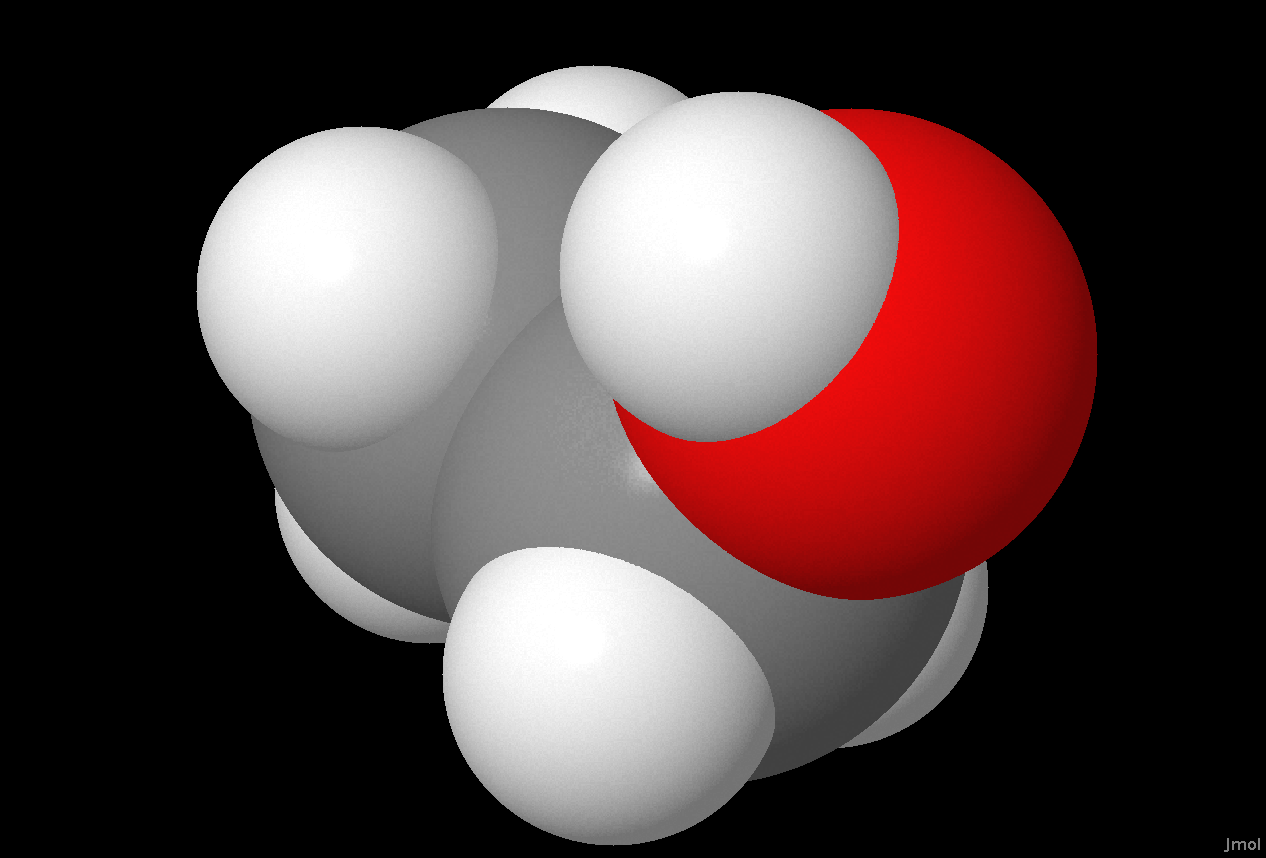
A 3D model of ethanol, a volatile, flammable, colorless liquid and a straight-chain alcohol with the molecular formula of C_{2}H_{5}OH.

The presence of ethanol can lead to the formations of non-lamellar phases also known as non-bilayer phases. Ethanol has been recognized as being an excellent solvent in an aqueous solution for inducing non-lamellar phases in phospholipids. The formation of non-lamellar phases in phospholipids is not completely understood, but it is significant that this amphiphilic molecule is capable of doing so. The formation of non-lamellar phases is significant in biomedical studies which include drug delivery, the transport of polar and non-polar ions using solvents capable of penetrating the biomembrane, increasing the elasticity of the biomembrane when it is being disrupted by unwanted substances (viruses, bacteria, solvents, etc.) and functioning as a channel or transporter of biomaterial.

== Biomembranes and phospholipid bilayers ==
Biological membranes are found in both prokaryotic and eukaryotic cells. They surround cells and organelles with a semi-permeable barrier that prevents free flow of substances. The membrane consists of a phospholipid bilayer structure and often embedded or otherwise associated proteins, along with cholesterol and glycolipids. The phospholipid bilayer is a two-layer structure mainly composed of phospholipids, which are amphiphilic molecules that have hydrophilic and hydrophobic regions. The hydrophilic region contains the polar head group. This region is exposed to aqueous substances located mainly in the exterior portion of the biomembrane. The hydrophobic region consists of the non-polar acyl chains or fatty acids groups facing the interior of the biomembrane. Phospholipids consist of two non-polar hydrocarbon chains with ester or ether bonds to the phosphate group which is also linked by ester or ether bonds to the polar hydrophilic region. The phospholipid carries a negative charge due to the presence of the phosphate group. Its overall polarity depends on the charges of the hydroxyl groups or alcohols such as choline, ethanolamine, inositol, serine, etc. attached to the phosphate group. There are six basic functions that are associated with biomembranes:

1. Controlling chemical potential and gradient for chemical species and charges across opposite sides of the membrane
2. Organizing enzymes and protein complexes for signal transduction or signaling
3. Managing protein and lipid interactions
4. Functioning as a substrate
5. Transferring vital information and material across the membrane
6. Compartmentalization by maintaining physical separation amongst membranes but still allowing proper communication

== Factors that affect biomembranes and lipid formations ==
There are two basic terms used to describe lipid phases: lamellar and non-lamellar phases. Lipids can undergo polymorphic or mesomorphic changes leading to the formation of lamellar or non-lamellar phases.

Various factors can affect the overall function of the biomembrane and decrease its ability to function as a protective barrier and maintained the order of the inner components. The bilayer thickness, surface charge, intermolecular forces, amphiphilic molecules, changes in free energy, alternating or spontaneous curvatures, increase or decrease in temperature, solvents, and the environment are all examples of different conditions that cause changes in biomembranes. For example, the strength of the intermolecular forces within the biomembrane are fairly strong but when lipids are extracted from biomembranes for analytical purposes there is a decrease in the constraints by the intermolecular forces against the phospholipids which may cause the lipid to undergo polymorphism as well as a temporary rearrangement of other lipids or proteins in the biomembrane. The thickness of the biomembrane determines the permeability of the membrane and ethanol, which can be used as a solvent, is able to reduce the thickness of the biomembrane which is one way this amphiphilic molecule is able to permeate through the biomembrane. There can also be free energy changes that can increase or decrease during the phase transitions of the phospholipids during polymorphism or mesomorphism which can also affect the curvature of lipids. All lipids can experience some sort of positive or negative alternating or spontaneous curvature due to variations in sizes between the hydrophobic and the hydrophilic region. Temperature changes can also lead to changes in the biomembrane.

== Non-lamellar phases vs. lamellar phases ==
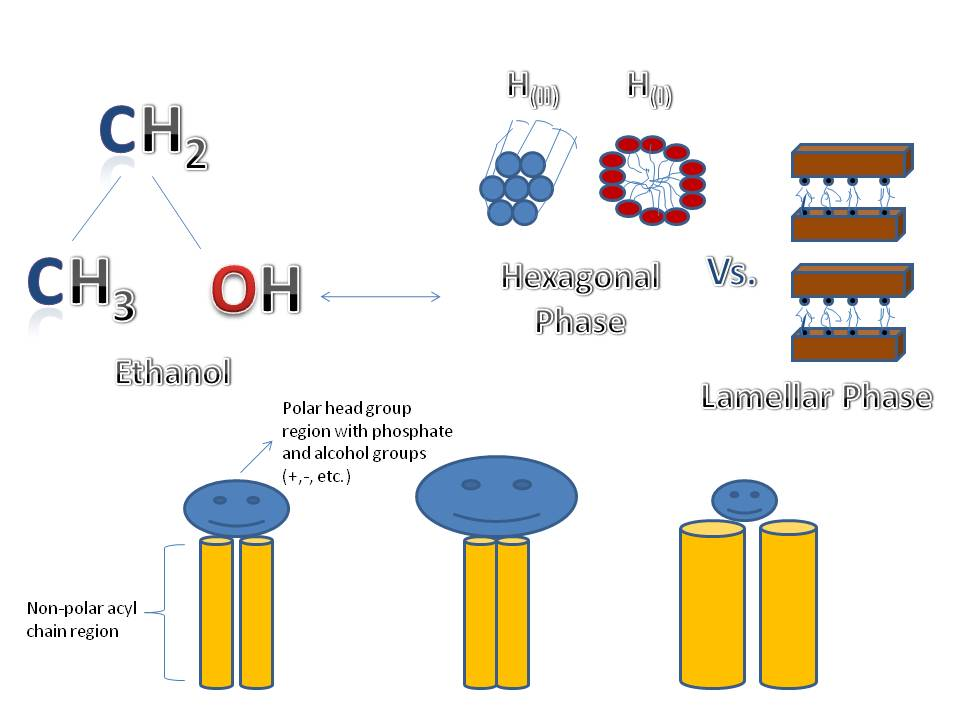
Schematic of how the addition of ethanol induces non-lamellar phases; hexaganol(I) and hexagonal(II) versus the lamellar phase described as the bilayer on top of bilayer. Below the schematic is an example of how the hydrophilic region (head group) can be larger or smaller than the hydrophobic region (acyl chains) which affects the curvature as well as the phase of the phospholipid.

When lipids are extracted or isolated from biomembranes, polymorphism and mesomorphism can occur because they are then no longer under the intermolecular constraints that are present within the biomembrane. This can lead to formation of non-lamellar (non-bilayer) or lamellar phases in phospholipids. "Polymorphism" refers to formation of diverse structures such as three-dimensional tubes, rods, and structures with cubic symmetry. Mesomorphism refers to phase transitions when heat is applied. For example, a lipid can be in the lamellar phase at a lower temperature, but as the temperature increases, it transitions into a non-lamellar phase. It is important to consider the size of the hydrophilic region versus the hydrophobic region. For example, if the hydrophilic region and hydrophobic region are similar, a cylindrical shape lipid bilayer is formed; but when the hydrophilic regions is smaller than the hydrophobic region a cone-shaped lipid bilayer is formed. Another example is the formation of micelles which has a non-lamellar formation in which the hydrophilic region is significantly larger compared to the hydrophobic region. There are various liquid-crystalline phases that can exist in lipids. Liquid-crystalline phases are when the hydrophobic chain regions are not motionless but are allowed to move about freely in a fluid-like melted state. The lamellar phase (Lα) is the most common and dominant phase in lipids and are aligned as stacks of bilayers on top of bilayers oriented in one single direction.

Non-lamellar phases are known as non-bilayer liquid-crystalline phases without lamellar symmetry (Lα). They include hexagonal (I), hexagonal (II), and three-dimensional cubic phases. Hexagonal (I) phases are non-inverted or oil-in-water phases in which a net convex curvature is present and this is similar to micelles. Hexagonal(II) phases are inverted water-in-oil phases with net concave curvatures describing the lipid and water interactions. Cubic phases (Pn3m, Im3m, la3d, etc.) or bicontinuous cubic phases composed of multiple connected bilayers that resemble a three-dimensional cube. The presence of non-lamellar lipids in biomembranes affect the elasticity of the lipid bilayer, especially when it is disrupted, for example during phase transitions, membrane fusion and fission or interactions with membrane peptides and proteins.

== Analytical techniques used for characterizing lipids ==
There are various analytical instruments and techniques used to characterized and monitor the different properties of lipids; X-ray diffraction, differential scanning calorimetry (DSC), nuclear magnetic resonance which include ^{2}HNMR and ^{31}PNMR, thin layer chromatography (TLC), fluorescence recovery after photobleaching (FRAP), nearest-neighbor recognition (NNR), and atomic molecular dynamics simulations (AMDS).

=== X-ray diffraction ===
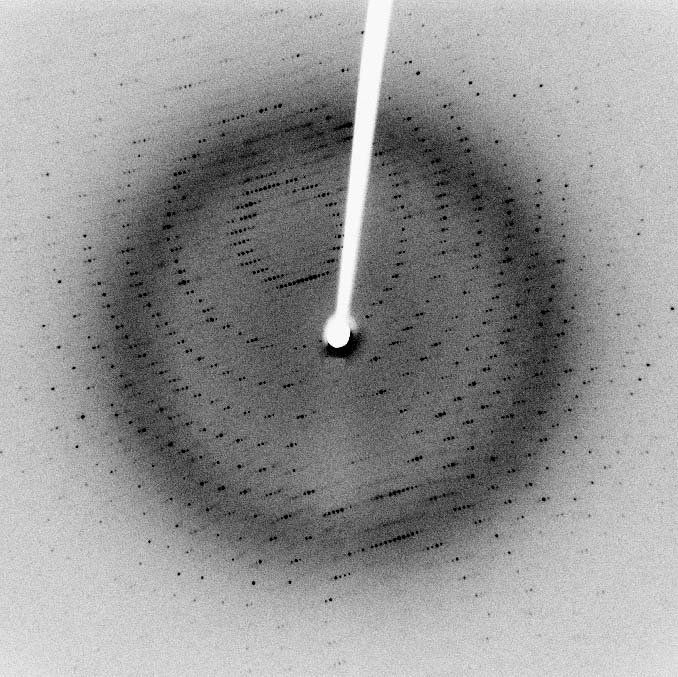
Dots form from the coherent interference of scattered X-rays passing through the crystal, in this case a protein.

X-ray scattering techniques are some of the most useful techniques for determining the structural identification and shape of lipids. An X-ray beam of light is applied to the lipid in which a distinct X-ray pattern is revealed. This lattice pattern is based on the electron density and localization of electrons dispersed throughout the lipid in order to determine atomic positions. The disadvantage is that it can be difficult to determine patterns in lipids that are not well oriented such as non-lamellar phases. Although this can be a limitation in producing electron density reconstructions in lipids, X-ray diffraction is still a reliable method for obtaining structural information and distinguishing between lamellar and non-lamellar phases.

=== Differential scanning calorimetry ===
Differential scanning calorimetry (DSC) is an analytical technique used to examine thermodynamic properties of molecules. It can study the thermal behavior of materials as they undergo physical and chemical changes during heat treatment. The parameters that are measured are referred to as the glass transition value (T_{g}) and melting temperature (T_{m}). These values are measured over time and are comparable between an inert reference sample and the analyte. Changes in the (T_{m}) and (T_{g}) values evaluate phase changes (solid, liquid-gel, liquid, etc.) in which an endothermic or exothermic process occurs. This technique is useful for monitoring the phase changes in phospholipids by providing information such as the amount of heat released or absorbed and time for phase transitions to occur, etc. DSC monitoring can occur at slow rates which is a disadvantage in monitoring fast phase transitions within phospholipids.

=== Hydrogen nuclear magnetic resonance ===
Hydrogen nuclear magnetic resonance (^{2}HNMR) is a technique that uses an external magnetic field and deuterium to replace the ordinary form of hydrogen. The ordinary form of hydrogen refers to the elemental form of hydrogen with a molecular weight of approximately 1 g/mol. It contains only one proton and has no neutrons. Deuterium is the isotope form of hydrogen which has a heavier mass compared to ordinary hydrogen. It contains one proton and neutron and has a molecular weight of approximately 2 g/mol. This technique can be used to investigate motions of acyl chains in lipids. It measures carbon and deuterium interactions and the mobility of these interactions within various regions of the lipid and also determines order parameters. The process involves using quadrupole signaling properties for examining lamellar versus non–lamellar phases as well. An external magnetic field monitors the alignment of paramagnetic compounds and uses changes in the positive or negative magnetic spin values to detect these changes.

=== Phosphorus nuclear magnetic resonance ===
Phosphorus nuclear magnetic resonance (^{31}PNMR) is a type of nuclear magnetic resonance technique that utilizes ^{31}phosphorus instead of deuterium. ^{31}P is dependent upon changes in the mobility and diffusion of a molecule. It also applies an external magnetic field to analyze the alignment of the paramagnetic compounds and uses changes in the positive or negative magnetic spin values to detect these changes. It is useful in distinguishing between lamellar and hexagonal phases that contain phosphate groups based on their distinct patterns and signals. A disadvantage to this technique is that it is limited to phospholipids.

=== Thin layer chromatography ===
Thin layer chromatography (TLC) is a type of chromatography technique that is used characterized or separate lipids. The lipids are separated based on the polarity of the head groups or hydrophilic region, not the hydrophobic region. Certain stains like iodine can be used to label the lipids but will sometimes destroy the lipids. This process can also be used to determine whether or not lipids have denatured. For example, originally a TLC analysis shows the presence of two lipids. One week later the same sample is reanalyzed but shows the presence of more lipids, which indicates the lipid has denatured.

=== Fluorescence recovery after photobleaching ===
Fluorescence recovery after photobleaching (FRAP) is a photochemical process applied to fluorophores when they lose their fluorescent properties. It can be used to measure the viscosity and lateral diffusion of a lipid bilayer. It also rejuvenates the fluorescence of the fluorophore and monitors how long this process takes to occur over time.

=== Nearest neighbor recognition ===
Nearest neighbor recognition (NNR) is a technique used to describe molecular interactions and patterns between lipid formations. Under thermal conditions it is used to recognize the preferences of lipids to closely interact with another lipid that has similar or different properties. It provides a molecular depiction of lipid bilayer formations by detecting and quantifying the tendency of exchangeable monomers to become what is termed as "nearest-neighbors" of one another in similar environments.

=== Molecular dynamics simulations ===
Molecular dynamics (MD) simulations are useful for simulating the motions of atoms and molecules according to physical laws. MD simulations are often applied to lipids to study atom-scale properties that may be difficult to observe otherwise. Force field parameters vary based on atom and molecule types. MD simulations may observe interactions between targeted lipids, proteins, hydrocarbons, water, hydrophilic/hydrophobic regions, ions, solvents, and other components that are present near the exterior and interior of a biomembrane.

== Current issues ==
There are various usages of ethanol which include an additive to gasoline, a primary ingredient for food preservation as well as alcoholic beverages and being used for transdermal drug delivery. For example, it can function as an antiseptic in topical creams to kill bacteria by denaturing proteins. Ethanol is an amphiphilic molecule meaning that it has chemical and physical properties associated with hydrophobic and hydrophilic molecules. Although, studies show that when penetrating through the biomembrane its hydrophobic abilities appear to be limited based on its preference to bind closely to the hydrophilic region of the phospholipids. There are various issues presented in regards to ethanol's ability to penetrate through the biomembrane and cause a reorganization of the phospholipids towards non-lamellar phases. The issues are: 1) how the alteration of the phospholipids' phase occurs 2) understanding the significance of ethanol's interaction with membrane proteins and membrane phospholipids 3) understanding the permeability of the biomembrane based on the tolerance and adaptation level in the presence of ethanol although this process appears to be concentration-dependent 4) determining the significance of ethanol's amphiphilic character as it relates to its ability to partition throughout the membrane by increasing the fluidity of it. Ethanol's hydrophobic properties are limited and primarily binds close the hydrophilic region of the phospholipid. This bonds creates strong hydrogen bonds and leads to a strong interlocking amongst the acyl chains 5) why the presence of cholesterol; a sterol compound, inhibits ethanol's ability to disrupt the membrane and 6) deriving the molecular-level mechanism of the entire process.

== Research areas ==
=== NNR ===
Research overview:

This study involves creating a combination of model membranes which contain 1,2-dipalmitoyl-sn-glycero-3-phosphocholine (DPPC) and 1,2-distearoly-sn-glycero-3-phosphocholine (DSPC) referred to as the "host membranes", phospholipids labeled as 1,2,& 3 referred to as "exchanging molecules" or "reporting molecules" and varied cholesterol mole percentages in the presence of an aqueous solution containing 5% ethanol (v/v). The host membranes were chosen because their phase diagrams are well understood and have been extensively characterized by different analytical techniques.6 The nearest neighbor recognition technique is being applied to the formation of the modeled membranes to observe the association between cholesterol and phospholipids as well as the effects that the presence of ethanol has against this interaction. Researchers are observing whether or not ethanol enhances or disrupts the liquid-ordered phase by reorganizing this formation into a liquid-disordered phase. The liquid-ordered phase is similar to a lamellar phase and the liquid-disordered phase represents the non-lamellar phases but the exact type of each phase (hexagonal, cubic, etc.) is not described. As previously mentioned several different combinations of the host membranes, exchanging molecules, and cholesterol are created to form the model membranes. It is important to mention that the exchanging molecules selected have similar properties to the host membranes. The exchanging lipids contain disulfide bonds as well as diacylglycerol groups that are not necessarily present in the host membranes. Studies provide evidence through monolayer measurements, condensing properties, and nearly identical gel to liquid-crystalline phase transition temperatures (Tm) to the host membranes that the presence of these bonds do not play a major role or interfere in the recognition or packing formation of the modeled membranes in the presence of ethanol. The disulfide bonds, diacylglycerol bonds, and similar sterol framework are only present to mimic the physical properties of DSPC, DPPC, and cholesterol as well as aid in the monomer exchanging processes to form exchangeable dimers. The exchangeable lipids undergo a monomer interchanging process through the disulfide bridges in which they either mix ideally, homogenously, or heterogeneously. Their interactions are measured by the equilibrium constant (K) which will be described in further detail under the significance of results section. Overall, the monomer interchanging process is necessary in order to demonstrate the nearest neighbor recognition technique effective by observing changes in the phase composition of the host membranes/phospholipids. Each model membrane consists of a high concentration of one of the host membranes/phospholipids (95% mol %), low concentrations of two exchanging lipids (2.5 mol% each for a total of 5%), varied mole percentages of cholesterol (0–30 mol %) plus a constant concentration of ethanol (5% v/v). An aqueous buffer solution contains the 5% ethanol (v/v) which is desired but due to evaporation, the value is lowered to approximately 2.9% ethanol.

Significance of research:

All experiments are carried out at 60 °C. Changes in the equilibrium constant (K) are used to determine what type of lipid interactions are occurring within the modeled membrane as well as observe liquid-ordered versus liquid-disorder regions. The value of the equilibrium constant determine the following: 1) if monomers are mixed ideally (K = 4.0) 2) when the monomers are mixed homogenously also referred to as a homo-association (K < 4.0) and 3) if the monomers have interchanged heterogeneously which is referred to as an hetero-association (K > 4.0) A plot of (K) is then created versus the cholesterol mol%. Each plot has similar trends in which the value of the equilibrium constant increased as the mol% increased with and without the presence of ethanol indicating a linear regression. Initially all the model membranes were organized in a liquid order phase but as the addition of cholesterol increase a liquid-disorder phase was observed. The following was determined regarding the liquid-order and liquid-disordered transitions during the addition of cholesterol in the presence of ethanol in each model membrane: 1) 0–15 mol% cholesterol a liquid-disordered phase was present 2) from 15 to 30 mol% there was a co-existence of both phases and 3) above 27 mole% of cholesterol the model membrane completed converted back to the original liquid-order phase within a two-hour time frame. The linear regression maxed out at 30 mol% of cholesterol. It is important to mention that ESR studies were also performed that show a coexistence of the liquid-order/liquid-disorder phase from 0 to 8 mole% and as well as 8–27 mol%. The model membrane containing DPPC, cholesterol, and exchanging lipids 1 and 2 show a drastic increase in the linear relationship between (K) versus the mol% of cholesterol. At approximately 8 mol% of cholesterol the start of the liquid-disordered phase begins. This same relationship is observed in the DSPC, cholesterol, and exchanging lipids 2 and 3 but the start of the liquid-disorder phase occurs at approximately 5.2 mole% with and without the presence of ethanol. Also, there is a higher equilibrium constant value in which the studies relate it to the stronger acyl chain interactions due to this region having longer carbon chains which results in a higher melting point as well. This study not only proves that in the presence of ethanol a reorganization or induced phase change takes place between the cholesterol-phospholipid interaction but that by using higher concentrations of sterol compounds like cholesterol it can hinder the effects of ethanol. The research also suggests that ethanol enhances the association between cholesterol-phospholipids within the liquid-ordered bilayers. The mechanism on how ethanol induces the liquid-disorder phase as well as enhances the cholesterol-phospholipid association is still not understood. The researchers have mentioned that part of the liquid-disorder formation occurs possibly be interrupting the hydrophobic region of the phospholipids, by binding closely towards the hydrophilic region of the phospholipid, and acting as "filler" since ethanol cannot closely align with the neighboring phospholipids. All of these possible mechanisms can be contributed to ethanol's amphiphilic nature.

=== AMDS ===
Research overview:

In this study there are several atomic-scale molecular dynamics simulations created to illustrate how ethanol affects biomembranes containing phospholipids. The phospholipid membrane systems are comparable to the model membranes above but it only consists of one phospholipid which is palmitoyl-oleoyl-phosphatidylcholine (POPC) or palmitoyl-oleoyl-phosphatidylethanolamine (POPE). The primary difference between the phosphatidylcholine (PC) and phosphatidylethanolamine (PE) is that the three methyl groups attached to the Nitrogen atom for the PC structure is replaced by three hydrogen groups. The overall purpose of this study is similar to the study described above determining the effects of ethanol on biomembranes and how it is able to increase disorder in the membrane interior region forming non-lamellar phases in phospholipids. The experimental method and analytical technique is quite different. In the previous study, it emphasized the NNR technique using a set of host phospholipids, exchanging lipids, ethanol, and cholesterol to create model membranes. An aqueous solution containing 5% ethanol (v/v) was maintained but the concentration of cholesterol was varied to prove how this sterol compound can inhibit the effects of ethanol (inducing a liquid-disorder phase or non-lamellar phases) which is depicted in the different plots of the equilibrium constant (K) versus the mol% of cholesterol for each model membrane. In this study, phospholipid membrane is comparable to the model membrane which consists of POPC, ethanol, water and in some cases the addition of monovalent ions (Na^{+}, K^{+}, and Cl^{−}) that are transported throughout the membrane in the presence of ethanol. The concentration of ethanol varies ranging from 2.5 to 30 mol% in an aqueous solution but there is no addition of any sterol compound. The atomic-scale molecular dynamics simulations are used to monitor the changes in the phospholipid membrane. All the simulations are carried out using GROMACS simulation suite software along with other methods that are essential to perform the simulations. The temperature and pressure are controlled at 310K and 1bar. The simulations are measured at various time frames which include ficoseconds (fs), picoseconds (ps), and nanoseconds (ns). A typical simulation is composed of approximately 128 POPC lipids and 8000 solvent molecules which include water and ethanol. In each simulation ethanol molecules, water molecules, head group regions, acyl chains, and the monovalent ions are all color-coded which aids in interpreting the results of the simulations. The concentrations of ethanol are 2.5, 5.0, 15.0 and 30 mol%. The amount of ethanol molecules depend on the concentration of ethanol present in the phospholipid membrane. Force field parameters are measured for the POPC lipids and monovalent ions (Na^{+}, K^{+}, and Cl^{−}), which are very important. A summary of the atomic-scale molecular dynamics simulations is then provided which contains important information as follows: 1) a system number that corresponds to a particular phospholipid simulation 2) the concentration of ethanol mol% used in a particular simulation 3) the concentration of ethanol (v/v%) used for the simulation 3) the ethanol/lipid ratio that is derived from the simulation 4) the area (nm2) of the phospholipid membrane which details the expansion of the membranes as the concentration of ethanol is increased 5) the thickness of the membrane which is based on the distance between the average positions of the phosphorus atoms on opposite sides of the phospholipid membrane and 6) the tilt of the head group of the POPC lipid based on changes in the angle towards the interior region of the phospholipid membrane which was surprisingly not very significant.

Significance of research:

The summary of the POPC simulations described above shows that the POPC system's initial area per lipid value was initially .65 ± .01 but it increases by more than 70% to 1.09 ± .03 at 10 mol% of ethanol which indicates the membrane begins to swell and expand as ethanol permeates through its exterior region. Due to the expansion of the membrane, the membrane thickness decreases from 3.83 ± .06 to 2.92 ± .05 which relates to the distance between the phosphorus atoms on opposite sides of the membrane. The study also supports the fact that ethanol prefers to bond just below the hydrophilic region of the phospholipids near the phosphate groups. The location of the ethanol creates a strong hydrogen bond between the water molecules. The results are depicted in the simulations and supported by mass density profiles as well. The mass density profiles show the location of the POPC lipids, water, and ethanol relevant to the hydrophobic core of the membrane and the concentration of ethanol. The mass density of ethanol increases as the concentration increases which indicates ethanol is moving towards the hydrophobic core of the membrane. The membrane becomes partially destroyed. The simulations also support that the interior of the membrane starts to become more hydrophilic due to the presence of water molecules in the interior region once the membrane is partially destroyed. The presence of ethanol also induced the formation of non-lamellar phases (non-bilayer) within the interior region (hydrophobic cored) of the phospholipid membrane. The results are supported by the simulations which show that at approximately 12 mol% of ethanol the membrane was no longer able to tolerate and adapt to the presence of the ethanol resulting in non-lamellar phases. The formations of the non-lamellar phases are described as being irreversible inverted-micelles. This irreversibility of the inverted-micelles are supported by mass density profiles which display an overlapping of leaflets from opposite membranes that interact forming a strong interlocking between the acyl chains or hydrophobic region with and without the presence of ethanol. Snapshots of the simulations are produced at 100 ns which compared the phospholipid membrane system in the presence of ethanol and in the absence of ethanol which continues to support ethanol's preference to bind near the hydrophilic region of the phospholipid. The researchers also added monovalent ions as salt ions (NaCl) to the phospholipid membrane system which formed non-lamellar phases (micelles) as well. This phenomenon is important because they predict that in the presence of ethanol the micelles can serve as transporters for hydrophilic structures across the membrane. Overall, in this study it shows that ethanol is able to penetrate throughout the membrane. I very important point that was revealed in this study is the fact that ethanol can destroy epithelial tissues (lips, throat, stomach, mouth) in humans. Therefore, one must consider some of the damaging effects of some alcoholic beverages that can contain up to 40% of ethanol (v/v).

== Conclusion and possible further research studies ==
The following was concluded based on ethanol's ability to induce non-lamellar phases:

1. Ethanol does induce non-lamellar phases (non-bilayer) but this process is concentration-dependent. On average the bilayers is preserved at approximately less than 10 mol%.
2. Ethanol prefers to bond in the hydrophilic region near phosphate groups which could be contributed to its amphiphilic character.
3. The effects of ethanol can be reversed or hindered in the presence of cholesterol (sterol compounds)
4. It may be necessary to perform a future study to compare the maximum amount of cholesterol (30 mol%) obtained in the NNR study to varied concentrations of ethanol as depicted in the AMDS study to see if ethanol is still hindered in the presence of sterol compounds.
