= Ethanol (data page) =

Chemical data page for ethanol

This page provides supplementary chemical data on ethanol.

== Material Safety Data Sheet ==
External MSDS

structure of ethanol

== Structure and properties ==
Structure and properties
Index of refraction, n_{25}
1.361
Dielectric constant, ε_{r}
24.3 ε_{0} at 20 °C
Bond strength
?
Bond length
?
Bond angle
?
Magnetic susceptibility
5.8×10^{−7} (cgs units, volume)
Surface tension
22.39 dyn/cm at 25 °C
Thermal conductivity
0.1660 W m^{−1} K^{−1} (saturated liquid at 300 K)
Viscosity

6.285 mPa·s	at −50 °C
4.656 mPa·s	at −40 °C
3.530 mPa·s	at −30 °C
2.731 mPa·s	at −20 °C
2.419 mPa·s	at −15 °C
2.151 mPa·s	at −10 °C
1.920 mPa·s	at −5 °C
1.720 mPa·s	at 0 °C
1.546 mPa·s	at 5 °C
1.394 mPa·s	at 10 °C
1.261 mPa·s	at 15 °C
1.144 mPa·s	at 20 °C
1.040 mPa·s	at 25 °C
0.948 mPa·s	at 30 °C
0.794 mPa·s	at 40 °C
0.670 mPa·s	at 50 °C
0.570 mPa·s	at 60 °C
0.487 mPa·s	at 70 °C
0.452 mPa·s	at 75 °C

== Thermodynamic properties ==
Phase behavior
Triple point	150 K (−123 °C), 0.00043 Pa
Critical point	514 K (241 °C), 63 bar
Std enthalpy change of fusion, Δ_{fus}H^{~~o~~}	+4.9 kJ/mol
Std entropy change of fusion, Δ_{fus}S^{~~o~~}	+31 J/(mol·K)
Std enthalpy change of vaporization, Δ_{vap}H^{~~o~~}	+42.3±0.4 kJ/mol
Std entropy change of vaporization, Δ_{vap}S^{~~o~~}	109.67 J/(mol·K)
Molal freezing point constant	−1.99 °C kg/mol
Solid properties
Std enthalpy change of formation, Δ_{f}H^{~~o~~}_{solid}	−277.7 kJ/mol
Standard molar entropy, S^{~~o~~}_{solid}	160.7 J/(mol K)
Heat capacity, c_{p}	111.46 J/(mol K)
Liquid properties
Std enthalpy change of formation, Δ_{f}H^{~~o~~}_{liquid}	−277.38 kJ/mol
Standard molar entropy, S^{~~o~~}_{liquid}	159.9 J/(mol K)
Enthalpy of combustion, Δ_{c}H^{~~o~~}	−1370.7 kJ/mol
Heat capacity, c_{p}	112.4 J/(mol K)
Gas properties
Std enthalpy change of formation, Δ_{f}H^{~~o~~}_{gas}	−235.3 kJ/mol
Standard molar entropy, S^{~~o~~}_{gas}	283 J/(mol K)
Heat capacity, c_{p}	78.28 J/(mol K) at 90 °C; 87.53 J/(mol K) at 110-220 °C
Heat capacity ratio, γ = c_{p}/c_{v}	1.13 at 90 °C
van der Waals' constants	a = 1217.9 L^{2} kPa/mol^{2} b = 0.08407 L/mol

== Spectral data ==
UV-Vis
λ_{max}
? nm
Extinction coefficient, ε
?
IR
Major absorption bands

(liquid film)
Wave number	transmittance
880 cm^{−1}	22%
1048 cm^{−1}	6%
1089 cm^{−1}	19%
1275 cm^{−1}	52%
1329 cm^{−1}	44%
1384 cm^{−1}	32%
1418 cm^{−1}	33%
1650 cm^{−1}	26%
1926 cm^{−1}	62%
2899 cm^{−1}	12%
2930 cm^{−1}	13%
2977 cm^{−1}	4%

NMR
Proton NMR

Carbon-13 NMR
http://riodb01.ibase.aist.go.jp/sdbs/cgi-bin/IMG.cgi?fname=CDS00245&imgdir=cdsW;
Other NMR data

MS
Masses of
main fragments

== Vapor pressure of liquid ==
P in mm Hg	1	10	40	100	400	760	1,520	3,800	7,600	15,200	30,400	45,600
P in Pa	133.3	1,333	5,333	13,332	53,329	101,325	202,650	506,625	1,013,250	2,026,500	4,053,000	6,079,501
T in °C	−31.3	−2.3	19.0	34.9	63.5	78.4	97.5	126.0	151.8	183.0	218.0	242.0
T in K	241.85	270.85	292.15	308.05	336.65	351.55	370.65	399.15	424.95	456.15	491.15	515.15

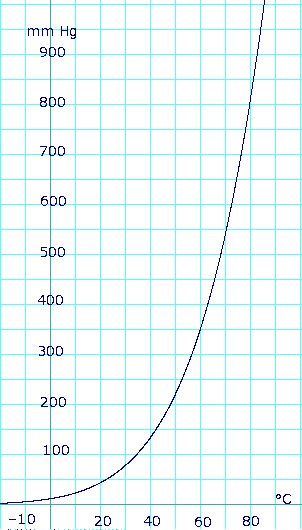
Ethanol vapor pressure vs. temperature. Uses formula $P_\text{mm Hg} = 10^{8.04494 - \frac{1554.3}{222.65 + T}}$

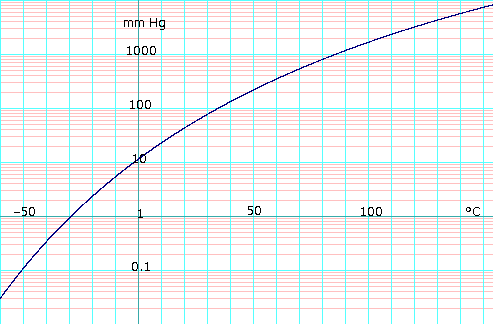
Log_{10} of ethanol vapor pressure vs. temperature. Uses formula $\log_{10} P_\text{mm Hg} = 8.04494 - \tfrac{1554.3}{222.65 + T}$

== Density of ethanol at various temperatures ==
Data obtained from Lange 1967

T °C	ρ, g/cm^{3}	T °C	ρ, g/cm^{3}	T °C	ρ, g/cm^{3}
3	0.80374	16	0.79283	29	0.78182
4	0.80290	17	0.79198	30	0.78097
5	0.80207	18	0.79114	31	0.78012
6	0.80123	19	0.79029	32	0.77927
7	0.80039	20	0.78945	33	0.77841
8	0.79956	21	0.78860	34	0.77756
9	0.79872	22	0.78775	35	0.77671
10	0.79788	23	0.78691	36	0.77585
11	0.79704	24	0.78606	37	0.77500
12	0.79620	25	0.78522	38	0.77414
		39	0.77329	40	0.77244

These data correlate as ρ [g/cm^{3}] = −8.461834×10^{−4} T [°C] + 0.8063372 with an R^{2} = 0.99999.

== Properties of aqueous ethanol solutions ==
Data obtained from Lange 1967

Mass fraction, %	Volume concentration, %	Mass concentration, g/(100 ml) at 15.56 °C	Density relative to 4 °C water				Density at 20 °C relative to 20 °C water	Density at 25 °C relative to 25 °C water	Freezing temperature, °C
Mass fraction, %	Volume concentration, %	Mass concentration, g/(100 ml) at 15.56 °C	10 °C	20 °C	25 °C	30 °C	Density at 20 °C relative to 20 °C water	Density at 25 °C relative to 25 °C water	Freezing temperature, °C
0.0	0.0	0.0	0.99973	0.99823	0.99708	0.99568	1.00000	1.00000	0
1.0			0.99785	0.99636	0.99520	0.99379	0.99813	0.99811	
2.0			0.99602	0.99453	0.99336	0.99194	0.99629	0.99627	
2.5	3.13			0.99363					−1
3.0			0.99426	0.99275	0.99157	0.99014	0.99451	0.99447	
4.0	5.00	3.97	0.99258	0.99103	0.98984	0.98839	0.99279	0.99274	
4.8	6.00	4.76		0.98971					−2
5.0			0.99098	0.98938	0.98817	0.98670	0.99113	0.99106	
5.05	6.30	5.00		0.98930					
6.0			0.98946	0.98780	0.98656	0.98507	0.98955	0.98945	
6.8	8.47			0.98658					−3
7.0			0.98801	0.98627	0.98500	0.98347	0.98802	0.98788	
8.0			0.98660	0.98478	0.98346	0.98189	0.98653	0.98634	
9.0			0.98524	0.98331	0.98193	0.98031	0.98505	0.98481	
10.0	12.40	9.84	0.98393	0.98187	0.98043	0.97875	0.98361	0.98330	
11.0			0.98267	0.98047	0.97897	0.97723	0.98221	0.98184	
11.3	14.0	11.11		0.98006					−5
12.0	15.0		0.98145	0.97910	0.97753	0.97573	0.98084	0.98039	
13.0			0.98026	0.97775	0.97611	0.97424	0.97948	0.97897	
13.78	17.00	13.49							−6.1
14.0			0.97911	0.97643	0.97472	0.97278	0.97816	0.97757	
15.0			0.97800	0.97514	0.97334	0.97133	0.97687	0.97619	
15.02	18.50	14.68		0.97511					
16.0			0.97692	0.97387	0.97199	0.96990	0.97560	0.97484	
16.4	20.2			0.97336					−7.5
17.0			0.97583	0.97259	0.97062	0.96844	0.97431	0.97346	
17.5	21.5			0.97194					−8.7
18.0	22.10	17.54	0.97473	0.97129	0.96923	0.96697	0.97301	0.97207	
18.8	23.1			0.97024					−9.4
19.0			0.97363	0.96997	0.96782	0.96547	0.97169	0.97065	
20.0			0.97252	0.96864	0.96639	0.96395	0.97036	0.96922	
20.01	24.50	19.44		0.96863					
20.3	24.8			0.96823					−10.6
21.0			0.97139	0.96729	0.96495	0.96242	0.96901	0.96778	
22.0			0.97024	0.96592	0.96348	0.96087	0.96763	0.96630	
22.11	27.00	21.43		0.96578					−12.2
23.0			0.96907	0.96453	0.96199	0.95929	0.96624	0.96481	
24.0			0.96787	0.96312	0.96048	0.95769	0.96483	0.96329	
24.2	29.5			0.96283					−14.0
25.0	30.40	24.12	0.96665	0.96168	0.95895	0.95607	0.96339	0.96176	
26.0			0.96539	0.96020	0.95738	0.95422	0.96190	0.96018	
26.7	32.4			0.95914					−16.0
27.0			0.96406	0.95867	0.95576	0.95272	0.96037	0.95856	
28.0	33.90	26.90	0.96268	0.95710	0.95410	0.95098	0.95880	0.95689	
29.0			0.96125	0.95548	0.95241	0.94922	0.95717	0.95520	
29.9	36.1			0.95400					−18.9
30.0	36.20	28.73	0.95977	0.95382	0.95067	0.94741	0.95551	0.95345	
31.0			0.95823	0.95212	0.94890	0.94557	0.95381	0.95168	
32.0			0.95665	0.95038	0.94709	0.94370	0.95207	0.94986	
33.0			0.95502	0.94860	0.94525	0.94180	0.95028	0.94802	
33.8	40.5			0.94715					−23.6
34.0			0.95334	0.94679	0.94337	0.93986	0.94847	0.94613	
35.0			0.95162	0.94494	0.94146	0.93790	0.94662	0.94422	
35.04	41.90	33.25		0.94486					
36.0			0.94986	0.94306	0.93952	0.93591	0.94473	0.94227	
37.0			0.94805	0.94114	0.93756	0.93390	0.94281	0.94031	
38.0			0.94620	0.93919	0.93556	0.93186	0.94086	0.93830	
39.0	46.3		0.94431	0.93720	0.93353	0.92979	0.93886	0.93626	−28.7
40.0			0.94238	0.93518	0.93148	0.92770	0.93684	0.93421	
40.04	47.40	37.61		0.93510					
41.0			0.94042	0.93314	0.92940	0.92558	0.93479	0.93212	
42.0			0.93842	0.93107	0.92729	0.92344	0.93272	0.93001	
43.0			0.93639	0.92897	0.92516	0.92128	0.93062	0.92787	
44.0			0.93433	0.92685	0.92301	0.91910	0.92849	0.92571	
45.0			0.93226	0.92472	0.92085	0.91692	0.92636	0.92355	
45.31	53.00	42.07		0.92406					
46.0			0.93017	0.92257	0.91868	0.91472	0.92421	0.92137	
46.3	53.8			0.92193					−33.9
47.0			0.92806	0.92041	0.91649	0.91250	0.92204	0.91917	
48.0			0.92593	0.91823	0.91429	0.91028	0.91986	0.91697	
49.0			0.92379	0.91604	0.91208	0.90805	0.91766	0.91475	
50.0			0.92162	0.91384	0.90985	0.90580	0.91546	0.91251	
50.16	58.0	46.04		0.91349					
51.0			0.91943	0.91160	0.90760	0.90353	0.91322	0.91026	
52.0			0.91723	0.90936	0.90524	0.90125	0.91097	0.90799	
53.0			0.91502	0.90711	0.90307	0.89896	0.90872	0.90571	
54.0			0.91279	0.90485	0.90079	0.89667	0.90645	0.90343	
55.0			0.91055	0.90258	0.89850	0.89437	0.90418	0.90113	
55.16	63.0	50.00		0.90220					
56.0			0.90831	0.90031	0.89621	0.89206	0.90191	0.89833	
56.1	63.6			0.90008					−41.0
57.0			0.90607	0.89803	0.89392	0.88975	0.89962	0.89654	
58.0			0.90381	0.89574	0.89162	0.88744	0.89733	0.89423	
59.0			0.90154	0.89344	0.88931	0.88512	0.89502	0.89191	
60.0			0.89927	0.89113	0.88699	0.88278	0.89271	0.88959	
60.33	68.0	53.98		0.89038					
61.0			0.89698	0.88882	0.88466	0.88044	0.89040	0.88725	
62.0			0.89468	0.88650	0.88233	0.87809	0.88807	0.88491	
63.0			0.89237	0.88417	0.87998	0.87574	0.88574	0.88256	
64.0			0.89006	0.88183	0.87763	0.87337	0.88339	0.88020	
65.0			0.88774	0.87948	0.87527	0.87100	0.88104	0.87783	
66.0			0.88541	0.87713	0.87291	0.86863	0.87869	0.87547	
67.0			0.88308	0.87477	0.87054	0.86625	0.87632	0.87309	
68.0			0.88071	0.87241	0.86817	0.86387	0.87396	0.87071	
69.0			0.87839	0.87004	0.86579	0.86148	0.87158	0.86833	
70.0			0.87602	0.86766	0.86340	0.85908	0.86920	0.86593	
71.0			0.87365	0.86527	0.86100	0.85667	0.86680	0.86352	
71.9	78.3			0.86311					−51.3
72.0			0.87127	0.86287	0.85859	0.85426	0.86440	0.86110	
73.0			0.86888	0.86047	0.85618	0.85184	0.86200	0.85869	
74.0			0.86648	0.85806	0.85376	0.84941	0.85958	0.85626	
75.0			0.86408	0.85564	0.85135	0.84698	0.85716	0.85383	
76.0			0.86168	0.85322	0.84891	0.84455	0.85473	0.85140	
77.0			0.85927	0.85079	0.84647	0.84211	0.85230	0.84895	
78.0			0.85685	0.84835	0.84403	0.83966	0.84985	0.84650	
79.0			0.85422	0.84590	0.84158	0.83720	0.84740	0.84404	
80.0			0.85197	0.84344	0.83911	0.83473	0.84494	0.84157	
81.0			0.84950	0.84096	0.83664	0.83224	0.84245	0.83909	
82.0			0.84702	0.83848	0.83415	0.82974	0.83997	0.83659	
83.0			0.84453	0.83599	0.83164	0.82724	0.83747	0.83408	
84.0			0.84203	0.83348	0.82913	0.82473	0.83496	0.83156	
85.0			0.83951	0.83095	0.82660	0.82220	0.83242	0.82902	
86.0			0.83697	0.82840	0.82405	0.81965	0.82987	0.82646	
87.0			0.83441	0.82583	0.82148	0.81708	0.82729	0.82389	
88.0			0.83181	0.82323	0.81888	0.81448	0.82469	0.82128	
89.0			0.82919	0.82062	0.81626	0.81186	0.82207	0.81865	
90.0			0.82654	0.81797	0.81362	0.80922	0.81942	0.81600	
91.00	94.00	74.62	0.82386	0.81529	0.81094	0.80655	0.81674	0.81331	
92.0			0.82114	0.81257	0.80823	0.80384	0.81401	0.81060	
93.0			0.81839	0.80983	0.80549	0.80111	0.81127	0.80785	
94.0			0.81561	0.80705	0.80272	0.79835	0.80848	0.80507	
95.0			0.81278	0.80424	0.79991	0.79555	0.80567	0.80225	
96.0			0.80991	0.80138	0.79706	0.79271	0.80280	0.79939	
97.0			0.80698	0.79846	0.79415	0.78981	0.79988	0.79648	
98.0			0.80399	0.79547	0.79117	0.78684	0.79688	0.79349	
99.0			0.80094	0.79243	0.78814	0.78382	0.79383	0.79045	
100.0	100.0	79.39	0.79784	0.78934	0.78506	0.78075	0.79074	0.78736	−114.3
Mass fraction, %	Volume concentration, %	Mass concentration, g/(100 ml) at 15.56 °C	Density relative to 4 °C water				Density at 20 °C relative to 20 °C water	Density at 25 °C relative to 25 °C water	Freezing temperature, °C
Mass fraction, %	Volume concentration, %	Mass concentration, g/(100 ml) at 15.56 °C	10 °C	20 °C	25 °C	30 °C	Density at 20 °C relative to 20 °C water	Density at 25 °C relative to 25 °C water	Freezing temperature, °C

== Boiling points of aqueous solutions ==
Data obtained from CRC Handbook of Chemistry (Page 2117)

BP °C	Weight % ethanol		BP °C	Weight % ethanol
BP °C	liquid	vapor	BP °C	liquid	vapor
78.1	95.5^{‡}	95.5^{‡}
78.2	91	92	86.5	18	71
78.4	85	89	87.0	17	70
78.6	82	88	87.5	16	69
78.8	80	87	88.0	15	68
79.0	78	86	88.5	13	67
79.2	76	85	89.0	12	65
79.4	74	85	89.5	11	63
79.6	72	84	90.0	10	61
79.8	69	84	90.5	10	59
80.0	67	83	91.0	9	57
80.2	64	83	91.5	8	55
80.4	62	82	92.0	8	53
80.6	59	82	92.5	7	51
80.8	56	81	93.0	6	49
81.0	53	81	93.5	6	46
81.2	50	80	94.0	5	44
81.4	47	80	94.5	5	42
81.6	45	80	95.0	4	39
81.8	43	79	95.5	4	36
82.0	41	79	96.0	3	33
82.5	36	78	96.5	3	30
83.0	33	78	97.0	2	27
83.5	30	77	97.5	2	23
84.0	27	77	98.0	1	19
84.5	25	75	98.5	1	15
85.0	23	74	99.0	< 1	10
85.5	21	73	99.5	< 1	5
86.0	20	72	100.0	0	0

^{‡}Azeotropic mixture

== Charts ==
Thermophysical properties of mixtures of ethanol with water and dodecane
Excess volume of the mixture of ethanol and water (volume contraction)	Heat of mixing of the mixture of ethanol and water	Vapor–liquid equilibrium of the mixture of ethanol and water (including azeotrope)
Solid–liquid equilibrium of the mixture of ethanol and water (including eutecticum)	Miscibility gap in the mixture of dodecane and ethanol	

This box:
- Except where noted otherwise, data relate to Standard temperature and pressure.
- Reliability of data general note.
