= Ethanol =

Organic compound

Full structural formula of ethanol
Skeletal formula of ethanol
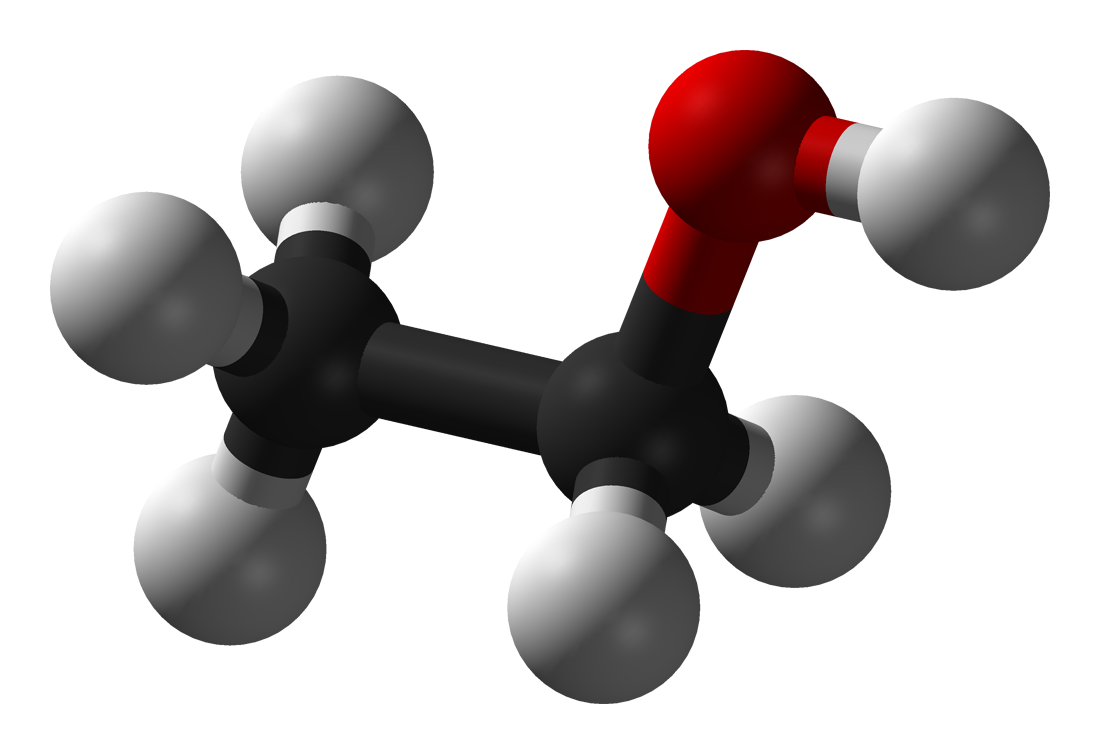
Ball-and-stick model of ethanol
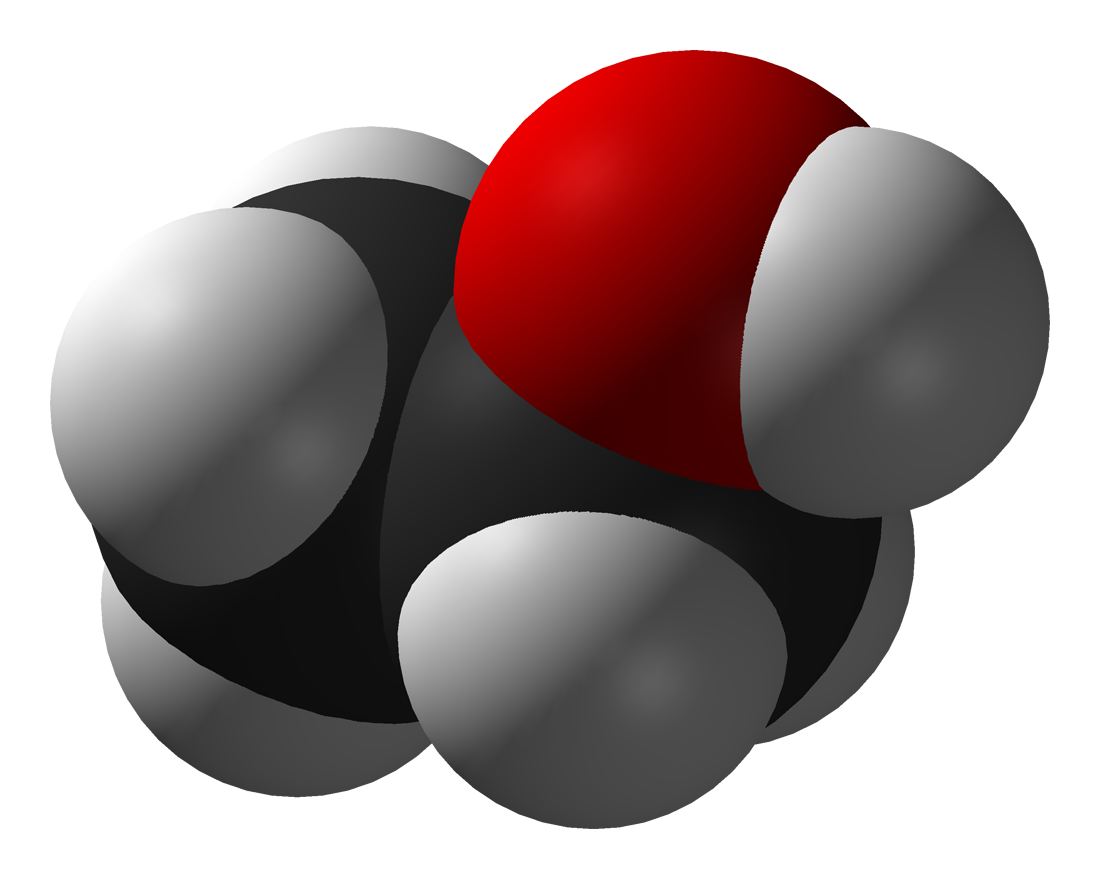
Space-filling model of ethanol
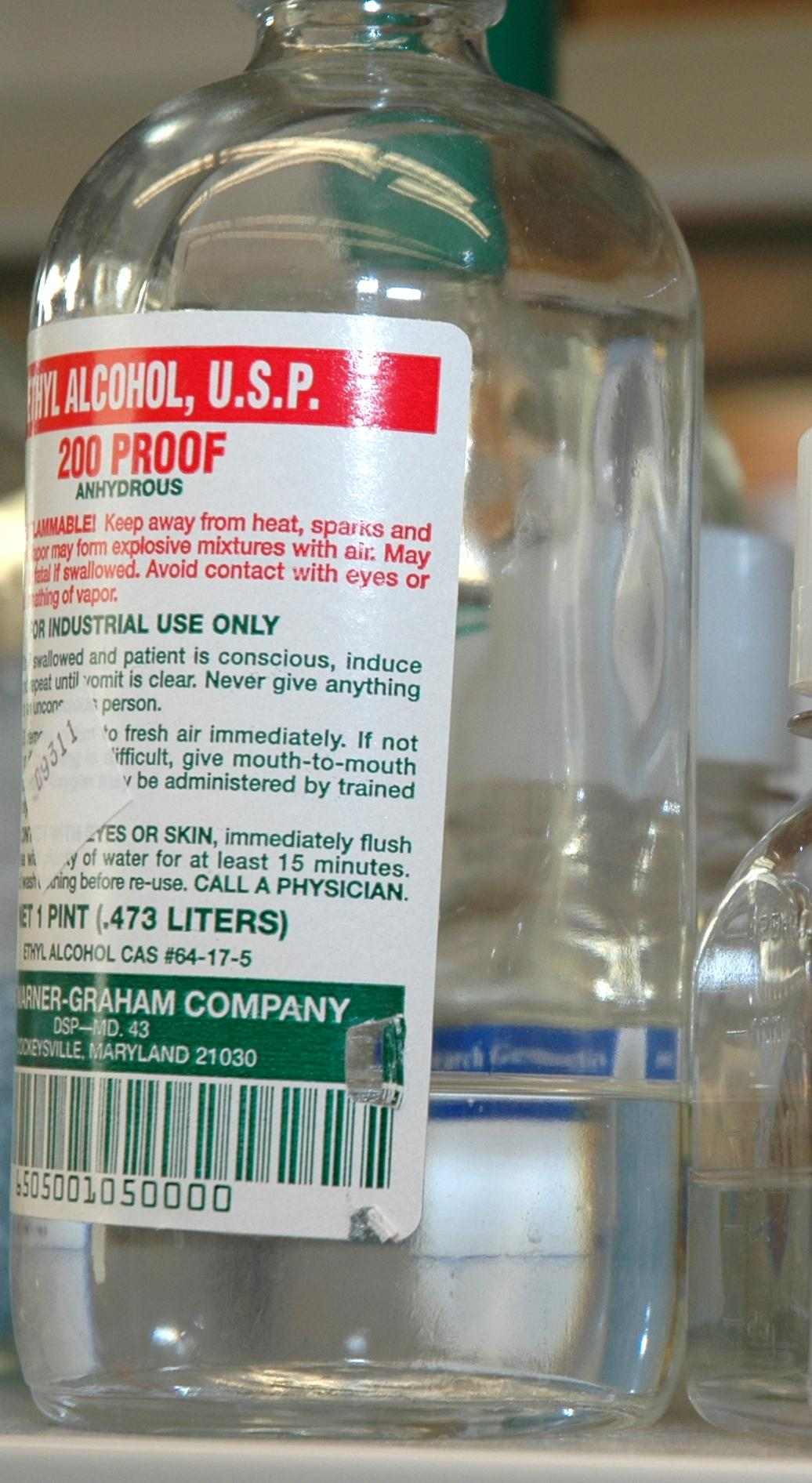
- USP grade ethanol for laboratory use

Names
Pronunciation	/ˈɛθənɒl/
- Preferred IUPAC name Ethanol
- Other names: Absolute alcohol; Alcohol; Cologne spirit; Drinking alcohol; Ethylic alcohol; Ethyl alcohol; Ethyl hydroxide; Ethylene hydrate; Ethylol; Grain alcohol; Hydroxyethane; Methylcarbinol

Identifiers
CAS Number	64-17-5
3D model (JSmol)	Interactive image
Abbreviations	EtOH
Beilstein Reference	1718733
ChEBI	CHEBI:16236
ChEMBL	ChEMBL545
ChemSpider	682
DrugBank	DB00898
ECHA InfoCard	100.000.526
Gmelin Reference	787
IUPHAR/BPS	2299
KEGG	C00469
PubChem CID	702
UNII	3K9958V90M
UN number	UN 1170
CompTox Dashboard (EPA)	DTXSID9020584
- InChI: InChI=1S/C2H6O/c1-2-3/h3H,2H2,1H3 Key: LFQSCWFLJHTTHZ-UHFFFAOYSA-N; InChI=1/C2H6O/c1-2-3/h3H,2H2,1H3 Key: LFQSCWFLJHTTHZ-UHFFFAOYAB
- SMILES: OCC

Properties
Chemical formula	C_{2}H_{6}O
Molar mass	46.069 g·mol^{−1}
Appearance	Colorless liquid
Odor	wine-like, pungent
Density	0.78945 g/cm^{3} (at 20 °C)
Melting point	−114.14 ± 0.03 °C (−173.45 ± 0.05 °F; 159.01 ± 0.03 K)
Boiling point	78.23 ± 0.09 °C (172.81 ± 0.16 °F; 351.38 ± 0.09 K)
Solubility in water	Miscible
log P	−0.31
Vapor pressure	5.95 kPa (at 20 °C)
Acidity (pK_{a})	15.9 (H_{2}O), 29.8 (DMSO)
Magnetic susceptibility (χ)	−33.60·10^{−6} cm^{3}/mol
Refractive index (n_{D})	1.3611
Viscosity	1.2 mPa·s (at 20 °C), 1.074 mPa·s (at 25 °C)
Dipole moment	1.69 D

Hazards
- GHS labelling
Pictograms	(GHS02: Flammable) (GHS07: Exclamation mark)
Signal word	Danger
Hazard statements	H225, H319, H360D
Precautionary statements	P210, P233, P240, P241, P242, P305+P351+P338
NFPA 704 (fire diamond)	2 3 0
Flash point	14 °C (57 °F; 287 K) (Absolute)
- Lethal dose or concentration (LD, LC)
LD_{50} (median dose)	7060 mg/kg (oral, rat); 3450 mg/kg (mouse)
- NIOSH (US health exposure limits)
PEL (Permissible)	TWA 1000 ppm (1900 mg/m^{3})
REL (Recommended)	TWA 1000 ppm (1900 mg/m^{3})
IDLH (Immediate danger)	3300 ppm
- Safety data sheet (SDS)

Related compounds
Related compounds	Ethane; Methanol

Supplementary data page
- Ethanol (data page)
- Except where otherwise noted, data are given for materials in their standard state (at 25 °C [77 °F], 100 kPa). verify (what is ?) Infobox references

Ethanol (also called ethyl alcohol, grain alcohol, drinking alcohol, or simply alcohol) is an organic compound with the chemical formula CH_{3}CH_{2}OH. It is an alcohol, with its formula also written as C_{2}H_{5}OH, C_{2}H_{6}O, or EtOH, where Et is the pseudoelement symbol for ethyl. Ethanol is a volatile, flammable, colorless liquid with a pungent taste. As a central nervous system (CNS) depressant, it is the active ingredient in alcoholic beverages, and the second most consumed drug globally behind caffeine.

Ethanol is naturally produced by the fermentation process of sugars by yeasts or via petrochemical processes such as ethylene hydration. Historically it was used as a general anesthetic, and has modern medical applications as an antiseptic, disinfectant, solvent for some medications, and antidote for methanol poisoning and ethylene glycol poisoning. It is used as a chemical solvent and in the synthesis of organic compounds, and as a fuel source for lamps, stoves, and internal combustion engines. Ethanol also can be dehydrated to make ethylene, an important chemical feedstock. As of 2024, world production of ethanol fuel was 120 gigaliters (3.2×10^{10} U.S. gallons), coming mostly from the U.S. (51%) and Brazil (30%).

The term "ethanol", originates from the ethyl group coined in 1834 and was officially adopted in 1892, while "alcohol"—now referring broadly to similar compounds—originally described a powdered cosmetic and only later came to mean ethanol specifically. Ethanol occurs naturally as a byproduct of yeast metabolism in environments like overripe fruit and palm blossoms, during plant germination under anaerobic conditions, in interstellar space, in human breath, and in rare cases, is produced internally due to auto-brewery syndrome.

Ethanol has been used since ancient times as an intoxicant. Production through fermentation and distillation evolved over centuries across various cultures. Chemical identification and synthetic production began by the 19th century.

== Name ==
Ethanol is the systematic name defined by the International Union of Pure and Applied Chemistry for a compound consisting of an alkyl group with two carbon atoms (prefix "eth-"), having a single bond between them (infix "-an-") and an attached −OH functional group (suffix "-ol").

The "eth-" prefix and the qualifier "ethyl" in "ethyl alcohol" originally came from the name "ethyl" assigned in 1834 to the group C_{2}H_{5}− by Justus Liebig. He coined the word from the German name Aether of the compound C_{2}H_{5}−O−C_{2}H_{5} (commonly called "ether" in English, more specifically called "diethyl ether"). According to the Oxford English Dictionary, Ethyl is a contraction of the Ancient Greek αἰθήρ (aithḗr, "upper air") and the Greek word ὕλη (hýlē, "wood, raw material", hence "matter, substance"). Ethanol was coined as a result of a resolution on naming alcohols and phenols that was adopted at the International Conference on Chemical Nomenclature that was held in April 1892 in Geneva, Switzerland.

The term alcohol now refers to a wider class of substances in chemistry nomenclature, but in common parlance it remains the name of ethanol. It is a medieval loan from Arabic al-kuḥl, a powdered ore of antimony used since antiquity as a cosmetic, and retained that meaning in Middle Latin. The use of 'alcohol' for ethanol (in full, "alcohol of wine") was first recorded in 1753. Before the late 18th century the term alcohol generally referred to any sublimated substance.

== Uses ==
=== Recreational drug ===
As a central nervous system depressant, ethanol is one of the most commonly consumed psychoactive drugs. Despite alcohol's psychoactive, addictive, and carcinogenic properties, it is readily available and legal for sale in many countries. There are laws regulating the sale, exportation/importation, taxation, manufacturing, consumption, and possession of alcoholic beverages. The most common regulations are excise, and prohibition for minors.

In mammals, ethanol is primarily metabolized in the liver and stomach by ADH enzymes. These enzymes catalyze the oxidation of ethanol into acetaldehyde (ethanal):

CH_{3}CH_{2}OH + NAD^{+} → CH_{3}CHO + NADH + H^{+}

When present in significant concentrations, this metabolism of ethanol is additionally aided by the cytochrome P450 enzyme CYP2E1 in humans, while trace amounts are also metabolized by catalase. The resulting intermediate, acetaldehyde, is a known carcinogen, and poses significantly greater toxicity in humans than ethanol itself. Many of the symptoms typically associated with alcohol intoxication—as well as many of the health hazards typically associated with the long-term consumption of ethanol—can be attributed to acetaldehyde toxicity in humans.

The subsequent oxidation of acetaldehyde into acetate is performed by aldehyde dehydrogenase (ALDH) enzymes. A mutation in the ALDH2 gene that encodes for an inactive or dysfunctional form of this enzyme affects roughly 50% of east Asian populations, contributing to the characteristic alcohol flush reaction that can cause temporary reddening of the skin as well as a number of related, and often unpleasant, symptoms of acetaldehyde toxicity. This mutation is typically accompanied by another mutation in the ADH enzyme ADH1B in roughly 80% of east Asians, which improves the catalytic efficiency of converting ethanol into acetaldehyde.

=== Medical ===
Ethanol is the oldest known sedative, used as an oral general anesthetic during surgery in ancient Mesopotamia and in medieval times. Mild intoxication starts at a blood alcohol concentration of 0.03 – 0.05% and induces anesthetic coma at 0.4%. This use carries the high risk of deadly alcohol intoxication, pulmonary aspiration and vomiting, which led to use of alternatives in antiquity, such as opium and cannabis, and later diethyl ether, starting in the 1840s.

Ethanol is used as an antiseptic in medical wipes and hand sanitizer gels for its bactericidal and anti-fungal effects. Ethanol kills microorganisms by dissolving their membrane lipid bilayer and denaturing their proteins, and is effective against most bacteria, fungi and viruses. It is ineffective against bacterial spores, which can be treated with hydrogen peroxide.

A solution of 70% ethanol is more effective than pure ethanol because ethanol relies on water molecules for optimal antimicrobial activity. Absolute ethanol may inactivate microbes without destroying them because the alcohol is unable to fully permeate the microbe's membrane. Ethanol can also be used as a disinfectant and antiseptic by inducing cell dehydration through disruption of the osmotic balance across the cell membrane, causing water to leave the cell, leading to cell death.

Ethanol may be administered as an antidote to ethylene glycol poisoning and methanol poisoning. It does so by acting as a competitive inhibitor against methanol and ethylene glycol for alcohol dehydrogenase (ADH). Though it has more side effects, ethanol is less expensive and more readily available than fomepizole in the role.

Ethanol is used to dissolve many water-insoluble medications and related compounds. Liquid preparations of pain medications, cough and cold medicines, and mouth washes, for example, may contain up to 25% ethanol and may need to be avoided in individuals with adverse reactions to ethanol such as alcohol-induced respiratory reactions. Ethanol is present mainly as an antimicrobial preservative in over 700 liquid preparations of medicine including acetaminophen, iron supplements, ranitidine, furosemide, mannitol, phenobarbital, trimethoprim/sulfamethoxazole and over-the-counter cough medicine.

Some medicinal solutions of ethanol are also known as tinctures.

=== Energy source ===
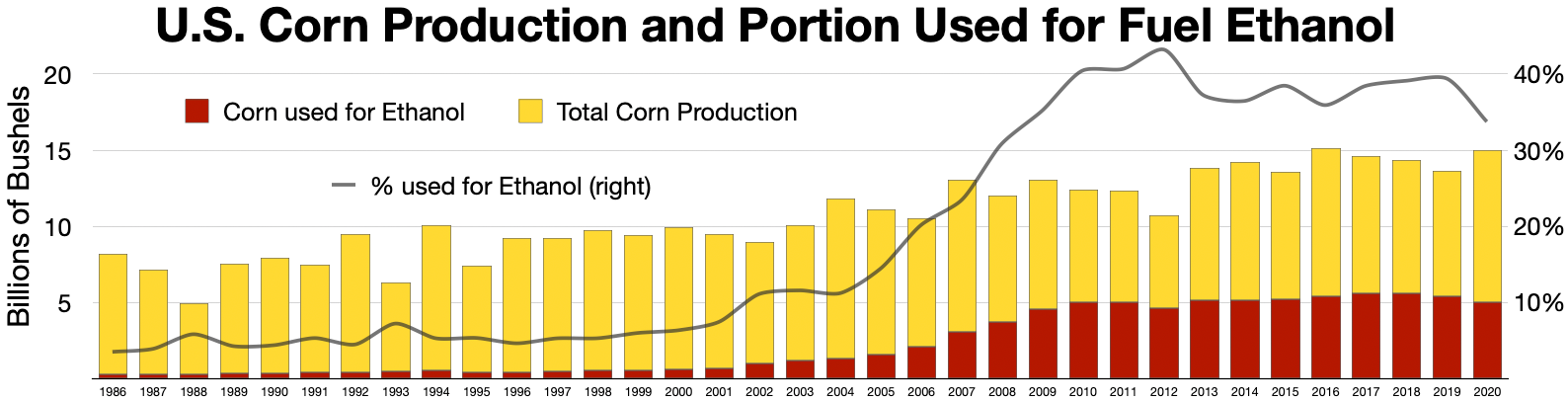
Corn vs ethanol production in the United States Total corn production (bushels) (left) Corn used for Ethanol fuel (bushels) (left) Percent of corn used for Ethanol (right)

The largest single use of ethanol is as an engine fuel and fuel additive. Brazil in particular relies heavily upon the use of ethanol as an engine fuel, due in part to its role as one of the world's leading producers of ethanol. Gasoline sold in Brazil contains at least 25% anhydrous ethanol. Hydrous ethanol (about 95% ethanol and 5% water) can be used as fuel in more than 90% of new gasoline-fueled cars sold in the country.

The US and many other countries primarily use E10 (10% ethanol, sometimes known as gasohol) and E85 (85% ethanol) ethanol/gasoline mixtures. Over time, it is believed that a material portion of the ≈150-billion-US-gallon (570,000,000 m^{3}) per year market for gasoline will begin to be replaced with fuel ethanol.

Australian law limits the use of pure ethanol from sugarcane waste to 10% in automobiles. Older cars (and vintage cars designed to use a slower burning fuel) should have the engine valves upgraded or replaced.

According to an industry advocacy group, ethanol as a fuel reduces harmful tailpipe emissions of carbon monoxide, particulate matter, oxides of nitrogen, and other ozone-forming pollutants. Argonne National Laboratory analyzed greenhouse gas emissions of many different engine and fuel combinations, and found that biodiesel/petrodiesel blend (B20) showed a reduction of 8%, conventional E85 ethanol blend a reduction of 17% and cellulosic ethanol 64%, compared with pure gasoline. Ethanol has a much greater research octane number (RON) than gasoline, meaning it is less prone to pre-ignition, allowing for better ignition advance which means more torque, and efficiency in addition to the lower carbon emissions.

Ethanol combustion in an internal combustion engine yields many of the products of incomplete combustion produced by gasoline and significantly larger amounts of formaldehyde and related species such as acetaldehyde. This leads to a significantly larger photochemical reactivity and more ground level ozone. This data has been assembled into The Clean Fuels Report comparison of fuel emissions and show that ethanol exhaust generates 2.14 times as much ozone as gasoline exhaust. When this is added into the custom Localized Pollution Index of The Clean Fuels Report, the local pollution of ethanol (pollution that contributes to smog) is rated 1.7, where gasoline is 1.0 and higher numbers signify greater pollution. The California Air Resources Board formalized this issue in 2008 by recognizing control standards for formaldehydes as an emissions control group, much like the conventional NO_{x} and reactive organic gases (ROGs).

More than 20% of Brazilian cars are able to use 100% ethanol as fuel, which includes ethanol-only engines and flex-fuel engines. Flex-fuel engines in Brazil are able to work with all ethanol, all gasoline or any mixture of both. In the United States, flex-fuel vehicles can run on 0% to 85% ethanol (15% gasoline) since higher ethanol blends are not yet allowed or efficient. Brazil supports this fleet of ethanol-burning automobiles with large national infrastructure that produces ethanol from domestically grown sugarcane.

The Indian government has heavily promoted Ethanol blending, recently approving E100 for the first time.

Ethanol's high miscibility with water makes it unsuitable for shipping through modern pipelines like liquid hydrocarbons. Mechanics have seen increased cases of damage to small engines (in particular, the carburetor) and attribute the damage to the increased water retention by ethanol in fuel.

Ethanol was commonly used as fuel in early bipropellant rocket (liquid-propelled) vehicles, in conjunction with an oxidizer such as liquid oxygen. The German A-4 ballistic rocket of World War II (better known by its propaganda name V-2), which is credited as having begun the space age, used ethanol as the main constituent of B-Stoff. Under such nomenclature, the ethanol was mixed with 25% water to reduce the combustion chamber temperature. The V-2's design team helped develop U.S. rockets following World War II, including the ethanol-fueled Redstone rocket, which launched the first U.S. astronaut on suborbital spaceflight. Alcohols fell into general disuse as more energy-dense rocket fuels were developed, although ethanol was used in recent experimental lightweight rocket-powered racing aircraft.

Commercial fuel cells operate on reformed natural gas, hydrogen or methanol. Ethanol is an attractive alternative due to its wide availability, low cost, high purity and low toxicity. There is a wide range of fuel cell concepts that have entered trials including direct-ethanol fuel cells, auto-thermal reforming systems and thermally integrated systems. The majority of work is being conducted at a research level although there are a number of organizations at the beginning of the commercialization of ethanol fuel cells.

Ethanol fireplaces can be used for home heating or for decoration. Ethanol can also be used as stove fuel for cooking.

Energy content (lower heating value) of some fuels compared with ethanol
Fuel type	MJ/L	MJ/kg	Research octane number
Dry wood (20% moisture)		~19.5	
Methanol	17.9	19.9	108.7
Ethanol	21.2	26.8	108.6
E85 (85% ethanol, 15% gasoline)	25.2	33.2	105
Liquefied natural gas	25.3	~55	
Autogas (LPG) (60% propane + 40% butane)	26.8	50	
Aviation gasoline (high-octane gasoline, not jet fuel)	33.5	46.8	100/130 (lean/rich)
Gasohol (90% gasoline + 10% ethanol)	33.7	47.1	93/94
Regular gasoline/petrol	34.8	44.4	min. 91
Premium gasoline/petrol			max. 104
Diesel	38.6	45.4	25
Charcoal, extruded	50	23	

=== Other uses ===
Ethanol is an important industrial ingredient with widespread uses as a precursor for other organic compounds such as ethyl halides, ethyl esters, diethyl ether, acetic acid, and ethyl amines. As ethanol also has a low boiling point, it is easy to remove from a solution that has been used to dissolve other compounds, making it a popular extracting agent for botanical oils.

Ethanol is found in paints, tinctures, markers, personal care products such as mouthwashes, perfumes and deodorants, and wet specimen preservatives. Polysaccharides precipitate from aqueous solution in the presence of alcohol, and ethanol precipitation is used for this reason in the purification of DNA and RNA. Because of its low freezing point of −114 °C (−173 °F) and low toxicity, ethanol is sometimes used in laboratories (with dry ice or other coolants) as a cooling bath to keep vessels at temperatures below the freezing point of water. For the same reason, it is also used as the active fluid in alcohol thermometers.

Ethanol is also used in removing several stains, as it is considered a universal solvent. Its molecular structure allows for the dissolving of both polar, hydrophilic and nonpolar, hydrophobic compounds. It can be used to dissolve oils, inks, and other substances.

== Chemistry ==
Ethanol is a 2-carbon alcohol. Its molecular formula is CH_{3}CH_{2}OH. The structure of the molecule of ethanol is CH_{3}−CH_{2}−OH (an ethyl group linked to a hydroxyl group), which indicates that the carbon of a methyl group (−CH_{3}) is attached to the carbon of a methylene group (−CH_{2}−), which is attached to the oxygen of a hydroxyl group (−OH). It is a constitutional isomer of dimethyl ether. Ethanol is sometimes abbreviated as EtOH, using the common organic chemistry notation of representing the ethyl group (−CH_{2}CH_{3}) with Et.

=== Physical properties ===
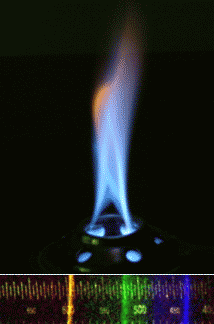
Ethanol burning with its spectrum depicted

Ethanol is a volatile, colorless liquid that has a slight odor. It burns with a smokeless blue flame that is not always visible in normal light. The physical properties of ethanol stem primarily from the presence of its hydroxyl group and the shortness of its carbon chain. Ethanol's hydroxyl group is able to participate in hydrogen bonding, rendering it more viscous and less volatile than less polar organic compounds of similar molecular weight, such as propane.

Ethanol's adiabatic flame temperature for combustion in air is 2082 °C or 3779 °F.

Ethanol is slightly more refractive than water, having a refractive index of 1.36242 (at λ=589.3 nm and 18.35 °C or 65.03 °F). The triple point for ethanol is 150 ± 20 K.

=== Solvent properties ===
Ethanol is a versatile solvent, miscible with water and with many organic solvents, including acetic acid, acetone, benzene, carbon tetrachloride, chloroform, diethyl ether, ethylene glycol, glycerol, nitromethane, pyridine, and toluene. Its main use as a solvent is in making tincture of iodine, cough syrups, etc. It is also miscible with light aliphatic hydrocarbons, such as pentane and hexane, and with aliphatic chlorides such as trichloroethane and tetrachloroethylene.

Ethanol's miscibility with water contrasts with the immiscibility of longer-chain alcohols (five or more carbon atoms), whose water miscibility decreases sharply as the number of carbons increases. The miscibility of ethanol with alkanes is limited to alkanes up to undecane: mixtures with dodecane and higher alkanes show a miscibility gap below a certain temperature (about 13 °C for dodecane). The miscibility gap tends to get wider with higher alkanes, and the temperature for complete miscibility increases.

Ethanol-water mixtures have less volume than the sum of their individual components at the given fractions. Mixing equal volumes of ethanol and water results in only 1.92 volumes of mixture. Mixing ethanol and water is exothermic, with up to 777 J/mol being released at 298 K.

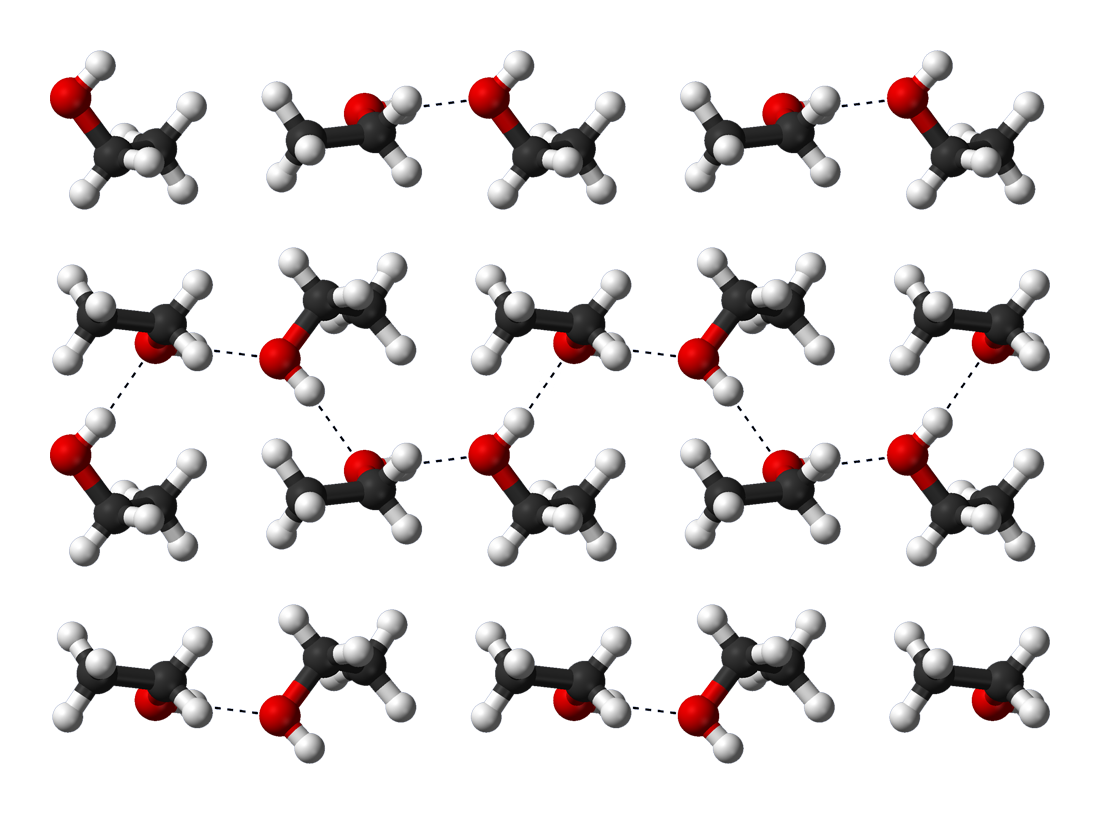
Hydrogen bonding in solid ethanol at −186 °C

Hydrogen bonding causes pure ethanol to be hygroscopic to the extent that it readily absorbs water from the air. The polar nature of the hydroxyl group causes ethanol to dissolve many ionic compounds, notably sodium and potassium hydroxides, magnesium chloride, calcium chloride, ammonium chloride, ammonium bromide, and sodium bromide. Sodium and potassium chlorides are slightly soluble in ethanol. Because the ethanol molecule also has a nonpolar end, it will also dissolve nonpolar substances, including most essential oils and numerous flavoring, coloring, and medicinal agents.

The addition of even a few percent of ethanol to water sharply reduces the surface tension of water. This property partially explains the "tears of wine" phenomenon. When wine is swirled in a glass, ethanol evaporates quickly from the thin film of wine on the wall of the glass. As the wine's ethanol content decreases, its surface tension increases and the thin film "beads up" and runs down the glass in channels rather than as a smooth sheet.

=== Azeotrope with water ===
At atmospheric pressure, mixtures of ethanol and water form an azeotrope at about 89.4 mol% ethanol (95.6% ethanol by mass, 97% alcohol by volume), with a boiling point of 351.3 K (78.2 °C; 172.7 °F). At lower pressure, the composition of the ethanol-water azeotrope shifts to more ethanol-rich mixtures. The minimum-pressure azeotrope has an ethanol fraction of 100% and a boiling point of 306 K (33 °C; 91 °F), corresponding to a pressure of roughly 70 torr (9.333 kPa). Below this pressure, there is no azeotrope, and it is possible to distill absolute ethanol from an ethanol-water mixture.

=== Flammability ===
An ethanol–water solution will catch fire if heated above a temperature called its flash point and an ignition source is then applied to it. For 20% alcohol by mass (about 25% by volume), this will occur at about 25 °C (77 °F). The flash point of pure ethanol is 13 °C (55 °F), but may be influenced very slightly by atmospheric composition such as pressure and humidity. Ethanol mixtures can ignite below average room temperature. Ethanol is considered a flammable liquid (Class 3 Hazardous Material) in concentrations above 2.35% by mass (3.0% by volume; 6 proof).

Flash points of ethanol–water mixtures
Ethanol mole fraction, %	Temperature	
Ethanol mole fraction, %	°C	°F
1	84.5	184.1
2	64	147
2.35	60	140
3	51.5	124.7
5	43	109
6	39.5	103.1
10	31	88
20	25	77
30	24	75
50	20	68
70	16	61
80	15.8	60.4
90	14	57
100	12.5	54.5

== Natural occurrence ==
Ethanol is a byproduct of the metabolic process of yeast. As such, ethanol will be present in any yeast habitat. Ethanol can commonly be found in overripe fruit. Ethanol produced by symbiotic yeast can be found in bertam palm blossoms. Although some animal species, such as the pentailed treeshrew, exhibit ethanol-seeking behaviors, most show no interest or avoidance of food sources containing ethanol. Ethanol is also produced during the germination of many plants as a result of natural anaerobiosis.

Ethanol has been detected in outer space, forming an icy coating around dust grains in interstellar clouds. Minute quantity amounts (average 196 ppb) of endogenous ethanol and acetaldehyde were found in the exhaled breath of healthy volunteers. Auto-brewery syndrome, also known as gut fermentation syndrome, is a rare medical condition in which intoxicating quantities of ethanol are produced through endogenous fermentation within the digestive system.

== Production ==
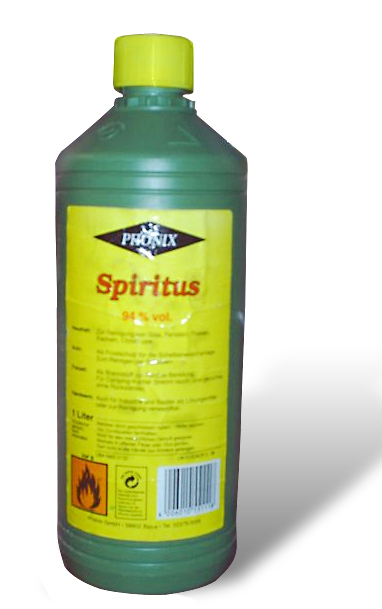
94% denatured ethanol sold in a bottle for household use

Ethanol is produced both as a petrochemical, through the hydration of ethylene and, via biological processes, by fermenting sugars with yeast. Which process is more economical depends on prevailing prices of petroleum and grain feed stocks.

=== Sources ===
World production of ethanol in 2006 was 51 gigalitres (1.3×10^{10} US gal), with 69% of the world supply coming from Brazil and the U.S. Brazilian ethanol is produced from sugarcane, which has relatively high yields (830% more fuel than the fossil fuels used to produce it) compared to some other energy crops. Sugarcane not only has a greater concentration of sucrose than corn (by about 30%), but is also much easier to extract. The bagasse generated by the process is not discarded, but burned by power plants to produce electricity. Bagasse burning accounts for around 9% of the electricity produced in Brazil.

In the 1970s most industrial ethanol in the U.S. was made as a petrochemical, but in the 1980s the U.S. introduced subsidies for corn-based ethanol. According to the Renewable Fuels Association, as of 30 October 2007, 131 grain ethanol bio-refineries in the U.S. have the capacity to produce 7 billion US gallons (26,000,000 m^{3}) of ethanol per year. An additional 72 construction projects underway (in the U.S.) can add 6.4 billion US gallons (24,000,000 m^{3}) of new capacity in the next 18 months.

In India ethanol is made from sugarcane. Sweet sorghum is another potential source of ethanol, and is suitable for growing in dryland conditions. The International Crops Research Institute for the Semi-Arid Tropics is investigating the possibility of growing sorghum as a source of fuel, food, and animal feed in arid parts of Asia and Africa. Sweet sorghum has one-third the water requirement of sugarcane over the same time period. It also requires about 22% less water than corn. The world's first sweet sorghum ethanol distillery began commercial production in 2007 in Andhra Pradesh, India.

Ethanol has been produced in the laboratory by converting carbon dioxide via biological and electrochemical reactions.

CO_{2} + H_{2}O → CH_{3}CH_{2}OH + side products

=== Hydration ===
Ethanol can be produced from petrochemical feed stocks, primarily by the acid-catalyzed hydration of ethylene. It is often referred to as synthetic ethanol.

C_{2}H_{4} + H_{2}O → C_{2}H_{5}OH

The catalyst is most commonly phosphoric acid, adsorbed onto a porous support such as silica gel or diatomaceous earth. This catalyst was first used for large-scale ethanol production by the Shell Oil Company in 1947. The reaction is carried out in the presence of high pressure steam at 300 °C (572 °F) where a 5:3 ethylene to steam ratio is maintained. This process was used on an industrial scale by Union Carbide Corporation and others. It is no longer practiced in the US as fermentation ethanol produced from corn is more economical.

In an older process, first practiced on the industrial scale in 1930 by Union Carbide but now almost entirely obsolete, ethylene was hydrated indirectly by reacting it with concentrated sulfuric acid to produce ethyl sulfate, which was hydrolyzed to yield ethanol and regenerate the sulfuric acid:

C_{2}H_{4} + H_{2}SO_{4} → C_{2}H_{5}HSO_{4}
C_{2}H_{5}HSO_{4} + H_{2}O → H_{2}SO_{4} + C_{2}H_{5}OH

=== Fermentation ===
Ethanol in alcoholic beverages and fuel is produced by fermentation. Certain species of yeast (e.g., Saccharomyces cerevisiae) metabolize sugar (namely polysaccharides), producing ethanol and carbon dioxide. The chemical equations below summarize the conversion:

C_{6}H_{12}O_{6} → 2 CH_{3}CH_{2}OH + 2 CO_{2}
C_{12}H_{22}O_{11} + H_{2}O → 4 CH_{3}CH_{2}OH + 4 CO_{2}

Fermentation is the process of culturing yeast under favorable thermal conditions to produce alcohol. This process is carried out at around 35–40 °C (95–104 °F). Toxicity of ethanol to yeast limits the ethanol concentration obtainable by brewing; higher concentrations, therefore, are obtained by fortification or distillation. The most ethanol-tolerant yeast strains can survive up to approximately 18% ethanol by volume.

To produce ethanol from starchy materials such as cereals, the starch must first be converted into sugars. In brewing beer, this has traditionally been accomplished by allowing the grain to germinate, or malt, which produces the enzyme amylase. When the malted grain is mashed, the amylase converts the remaining starches into sugars.

Sugars for ethanol fermentation can be obtained from cellulose. Deployment of this technology could turn a number of cellulose-containing agricultural by-products, such as corncobs, straw, and sawdust, into renewable energy resources. Other agricultural residues such as sugarcane bagasse and energy crops such as switchgrass may also be fermentable sugar sources.

=== Testing ===
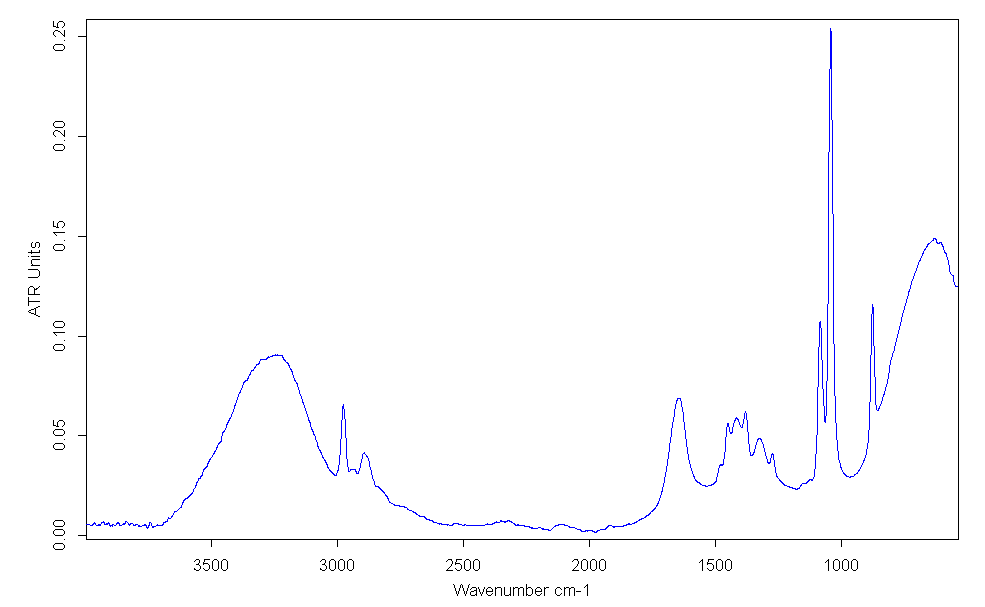
Infrared reflection spectra of liquid ethanol, showing the −OH band centered near 3300 cm^{−1} and C−H bands near 2950 cm^{−1}

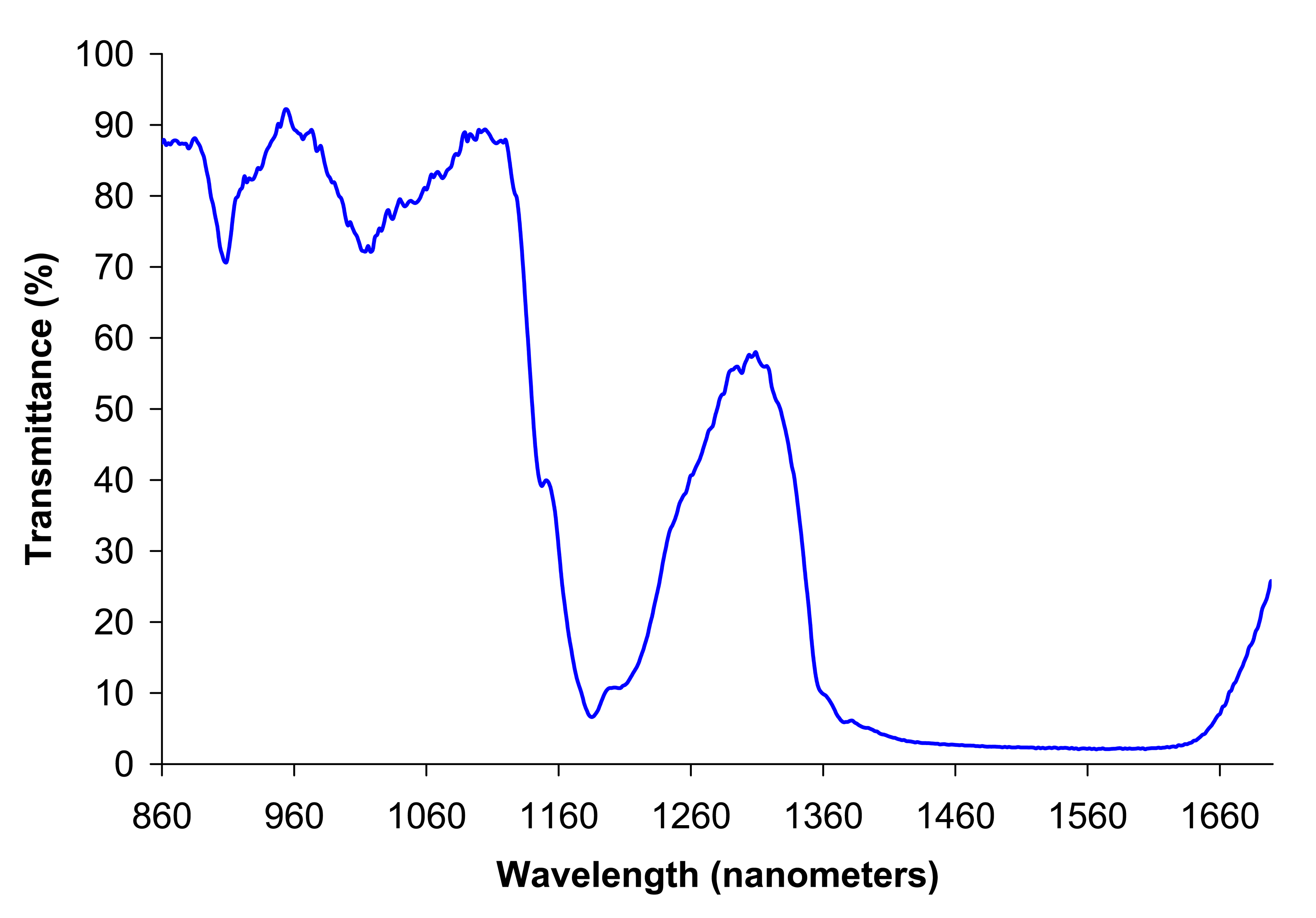
Near-infrared spectrum of liquid ethanol

Breweries and biofuel plants employ two methods for measuring ethanol concentration. Infrared ethanol sensors measure the vibrational frequency of dissolved ethanol using the C−H band at 2900 cm^{−1}. This method uses a relatively inexpensive solid-state sensor that compares the C−H band with a reference band to calculate the ethanol content. The calculation makes use of the Beer–Lambert law. Alternatively, by measuring the density of the starting material and the density of the product, using a hydrometer, the change in specific gravity during fermentation indicates the alcohol content. This inexpensive and indirect method has a long history in the beer brewing industry.

== Purification ==
Ethylene hydration or brewing produces an ethanol–water mixture. For most industrial and fuel uses, the ethanol must be purified. Fractional distillation at atmospheric pressure can concentrate ethanol to 95.6% by weight (89.5 mole%). This mixture is an azeotrope with a boiling point of 78.1 °C (172.6 °F), and cannot be further purified by distillation. Addition of an entraining agent, such as benzene, cyclohexane, or heptane, allows a new ternary azeotrope comprising the ethanol, water, and the entraining agent to be formed. This lower-boiling ternary azeotrope is removed preferentially, leading to water-free ethanol.

Apart from distillation, ethanol may be dried by addition of a desiccant, such as molecular sieves, cellulose, or cornmeal. The desiccants can be dried and reused. Molecular sieves can be used to selectively absorb the water from the 95.6% ethanol solution. Molecular sieves of pore-size 3 Å, a type of zeolite, effectively sequester water molecules while excluding ethanol molecules. Heating the wet sieves drives out the water, allowing regeneration of their desiccant capability.

Membranes can also be used to separate ethanol and water. Membrane-based separations are not subject to the limitations of the water-ethanol azeotrope because the separations are not based on vapor-liquid equilibria. Membranes are often used in the so-called hybrid membrane distillation process. This process uses a pre-concentration distillation column as the first separating step. The further separation is then accomplished with a membrane operated either in vapor permeation or pervaporation mode. Vapor permeation uses a vapor membrane feed and pervaporation uses a liquid membrane feed.

A variety of other techniques have been discussed, including the following:

- Salting using potassium carbonate to exploit its insolubility will cause a phase separation with ethanol and water. This offers a very small potassium carbonate impurity to the alcohol that can be removed by distillation. This method is very useful in purification of ethanol by distillation, as ethanol forms an azeotrope with water.
- Direct electrochemical reduction of carbon dioxide to ethanol under ambient conditions using copper nanoparticles on a carbon nanospike film as the catalyst;
- Extraction of ethanol from grain mash by supercritical carbon dioxide;
- Pervaporation;
- Fractional freezing is also used to concentrate fermented alcoholic solutions, such as traditionally made Applejack (beverage);
- Pressure swing adsorption.

=== Grades of ethanol ===
Pure ethanol and alcoholic beverages are heavily taxed as psychoactive drugs, but ethanol has many uses that do not involve its consumption. To relieve the tax burden on these uses, most jurisdictions waive the tax when an agent has been added to the ethanol to render it unfit to drink. These include bittering agents such as denatonium benzoate and toxins such as methanol, naphtha, and pyridine. Products of this kind are called denatured alcohol.

Absolute or anhydrous alcohol refers to ethanol with a low water content. There are various grades with maximum water contents ranging from 1% to a few parts per million (ppm). If azeotropic distillation is used to remove water, it will contain trace amounts of the material separation agent (e.g. benzene). Absolute alcohol is not intended for human consumption. Absolute ethanol is used as a solvent for laboratory and industrial applications, where water will react with other chemicals, and as fuel alcohol. Spectroscopic ethanol is an absolute ethanol with a low absorbance in ultraviolet and visible light, fit for use as a solvent in ultraviolet-visible spectroscopy. Pure ethanol is classed as 200 proof in the US, equivalent to 175 degrees proof in the UK system. Rectified spirit, an azeotropic composition of 96% ethanol containing 4% water, is used instead of anhydrous ethanol for various purposes. Spirits of wine are about 94% ethanol (188 proof). The impurities are different from those in 95% (190 proof) laboratory ethanol.

== Reactions ==
Ethanol is classified as a primary alcohol, meaning that the carbon that its hydroxyl group attaches to has at least two hydrogen atoms attached to it as well. Many ethanol reactions occur at its hydroxyl group.

=== Ester formation ===
In the presence of acid catalysts, ethanol reacts with carboxylic acids to produce ethyl esters and water:

RCOOH + HOCH_{2}CH_{3} → RCOOCH_{2}CH_{3} + H_{2}O

This reaction, which is conducted on large scale industrially, requires the removal of the water from the reaction mixture as it is formed. Esters react in the presence of an acid or base to give back the alcohol and a salt. This reaction is known as saponification because it is used in the preparation of soap. Ethanol can also form esters with inorganic acids. Diethyl sulfate and triethyl phosphate are prepared by treating ethanol with sulfur trioxide and phosphorus pentoxide respectively. Diethyl sulfate is a useful ethylating agent in organic synthesis. Ethyl nitrite, prepared from the reaction of ethanol with sodium nitrite and sulfuric acid, was formerly used as a diuretic.

=== Dehydration ===
In the presence of acid catalysts, alcohols can be converted to alkenes such as ethanol to ethylene. Typically solid acids such as alumina are used.

CH_{3}CH_{2}OH → H_{2}C=CH_{2} + H_{2}O

Since water is removed from the same molecule, the reaction is known as intramolecular dehydration. Intramolecular dehydration of an alcohol requires a high temperature and the presence of an acid catalyst such as sulfuric acid. Ethylene produced from sugar-derived ethanol (primarily in Brazil) competes with ethylene produced from petrochemical feedstocks such as naphtha and ethane. At a lower temperature than that of intramolecular dehydration, intermolecular alcohol dehydration may occur producing a symmetrical ether. This is a condensation reaction. In the following example, diethyl ether is produced from ethanol:

2 CH_{3}CH_{2}OH → CH_{3}CH_{2}OCH_{2}CH_{3} + H_{2}O

=== Combustion ===
Complete combustion of ethanol forms carbon dioxide and water:

C_{2}H_{5}OH (l) + 3 O_{2} (g) → 2 CO_{2} (g) + 3 H_{2}O (l); −Δ_{c}H = 1371 kJ/mol = 29.8 kJ/g = 327 kcal/mol = 7.1 kcal/g

C_{2}H_{5}OH (l) + 3 O_{2} (g) → 2 CO_{2} (g) + 3 H_{2}O (g); −Δ_{c}H = 1236 kJ/mol = 26.8 kJ/g = 295.4 kcal/mol = 6.41 kcal/g

Specific heat = 2.44 kJ/(kg·K)

=== Acid-base chemistry ===
Ethanol is a neutral molecule and the pH of a solution of ethanol in water is nearly 7.00. Ethanol can be quantitatively converted to its conjugate base, the ethoxide ion (CH_{3}CH_{2}O^{−}), by reaction with an alkali metal such as sodium:

2 CH_{3}CH_{2}OH + 2 Na → 2 CH_{3}CH_{2}ONa + H_{2}

or a very strong base such as sodium hydride:

CH_{3}CH_{2}OH + NaH → CH_{3}CH_{2}ONa + H_{2}

The acidities of water and ethanol are nearly the same, as indicated by their pKa of 15.7 and 16 respectively. Thus, sodium ethoxide and sodium hydroxide exist in an equilibrium that is closely balanced:

CH_{3}CH_{2}OH + NaOH ⇌ CH_{3}CH_{2}ONa + H_{2}O

=== Halogenation ===
Ethanol is not used industrially as a precursor to ethyl halides, but the reactions are illustrative. Ethanol reacts with hydrogen halides to produce ethyl halides such as ethyl chloride and ethyl bromide via an S_{N}2 reaction:

CH_{3}CH_{2}OH + HCl → CH_{3}CH_{2}Cl + H_{2}O

HCl requires a catalyst such as zinc chloride. HBr requires refluxing with a sulfuric acid catalyst. Ethyl halides can, in principle, also be produced by treating ethanol with more specialized halogenating agents, such as thionyl chloride or phosphorus tribromide.

CH_{3}CH_{2}OH + SOCl_{2} → CH_{3}CH_{2}Cl + SO_{2} + HCl

Upon treatment with halogens in the presence of base, ethanol gives the corresponding haloform (CHX_{3}, where X = Cl, Br, I). This conversion is called the haloform reaction. An intermediate in the reaction with chlorine is the aldehyde called chloral, which forms chloral hydrate upon reaction with water:

4 Cl_{2} + CH_{3}CH_{2}OH → CCl_{3}CHO + 5 HCl
CCl_{3}CHO + H_{2}O → CCl_{3}C(OH)_{2}H

=== Oxidation ===
Ethanol can be oxidized to acetaldehyde and further oxidized to acetic acid, depending on the reagents and conditions. This oxidation is of no importance industrially, but in the human body, these oxidation reactions are catalyzed by the enzyme liver ADH. The oxidation product of ethanol, acetic acid, is a nutrient for humans, being a precursor to acetyl CoA, where the acetyl group can be spent as energy or used for biosynthesis.

=== Metabolism ===
Ethanol is similar to macronutrients such as proteins, fats, and carbohydrates in that it provides calories. When consumed and metabolized, it contributes 7 kilocalories per gram via ethanol metabolism.

== Safety ==
Ethanol is very flammable and should not be used around an open flame. Atmospheric concentrations above one part per thousand are above the European Union occupational exposure limits.

Pure ethanol will irritate the skin and eyes. Nausea, vomiting, and intoxication are symptoms of ingestion. Long-term use by ingestion can result in serious liver damage. Globally, ethanol accounted for 1.8 million deaths in 2021.

== History ==
The fermentation of sugar into ethanol is one of the earliest biotechnologies employed by humans. Ethanol has historically been identified variously as spirit of wine or ardent spirits, and as aqua vitae (Latin for "water of life") or aqua vita. The intoxicating effects of its consumption have been known since ancient times. Ethanol has been used by humans since prehistory as the intoxicating ingredient of alcoholic beverages. Dried residue on 9,000-year-old pottery found in China suggests that Neolithic people consumed alcoholic beverages.

The inflammable nature of the exhalations of wine was already known to ancient natural philosophers such as Aristotle (384–322 BCE), Theophrastus (c. 371–287 BCE), and Pliny the Elder (23/24–79 CE). However, this did not immediately lead to the isolation of ethanol, despite the development of more advanced distillation techniques in second- and third-century Roman Egypt. An important recognition, first found in one of the writings attributed to Jābir ibn Ḥayyān (ninth century CE), was that by adding salt to boiling wine, which increases the wine's relative volatility, the flammability of the resulting vapors may be enhanced. The distillation of wine is attested in Arabic works attributed to al-Kindī (c. 801–873 CE) and to al-Fārābī (c. 872–950), and in the 28th book of al-Zahrāwī's (Latin: Abulcasis, 936–1013) Kitāb al-Taṣrīf (later translated into Latin as Liber servatoris). In the twelfth century, recipes for the production of aqua ardens ("burning water", i.e., ethanol) by distilling wine with salt started to appear in a number of Latin works, and by the end of the thirteenth century it had become a widely known substance among Western European chemists.

The works of Taddeo Alderotti (1223–1296) describe a method for concentrating ethanol involving repeated fractional distillation through a water-cooled still, by which an ethanol purity of 90% could be obtained. The medicinal properties of ethanol were studied by Arnald of Villanova (1240–1311 CE) and John of Rupescissa (c. 1310–1366), the latter of whom regarded it as a life-preserving substance able to prevent all diseases (the aqua vitae or "water of life", also called by John the quintessence of wine). Archaeological evidence in China indicates that the true distillation of alcohol began during the Jin (1115–1234) or Southern Song (1127–1279) dynasties. A still has been found at an archaeological site in Qinglong, Hebei, dating to the 12th century. In India, the true distillation of alcohol was introduced from the Middle East, and was in wide use in the Delhi Sultanate by the 14th century.

In 1796, German-Russian chemist Johann Tobias Lowitz obtained pure ethanol by mixing partially purified ethanol (the alcohol-water azeotrope) with an excess of anhydrous alkali and then distilling the mixture over low heat. French chemist Antoine Lavoisier described ethanol as a compound of carbon, hydrogen, and oxygen, and in 1807 Nicolas-Théodore de Saussure determined ethanol's chemical formula. Fifty years later, Archibald Scott Couper published the structural formula of ethanol, one of the first structural formulas determined.

Ethanol was first prepared synthetically in 1825 by Michael Faraday. He found that sulfuric acid could absorb large volumes of coal gas. He gave the resulting solution to Henry Hennell, a British chemist, who found in 1826 that it contained "sulphovinic acid" (ethyl hydrogen sulfate). In 1828, Hennell and the French chemist Georges-Simon Serullas independently discovered that sulphovinic acid could be decomposed into ethanol. Thus, in 1825 Faraday had unwittingly discovered that ethanol could be produced from ethylene (a component of coal gas) by acid-catalyzed hydration, a process similar to current industrial ethanol synthesis.

Ethanol was used as lamp fuel in the U.S. as early as 1840, but a tax levied on industrial alcohol during the Civil War made this use uneconomical. The tax was repealed in 1906. Use as an automotive fuel dates back to 1908, with the Ford Model T able to run on petrol (gasoline) or ethanol. It fuels some spirit lamps.

Ethanol intended for industrial use is often produced from ethylene. Ethanol has widespread use as a solvent of substances intended for human contact or consumption, including scents, flavorings, colorings, and medicines. In chemistry, it is both a solvent and a feedstock for the synthesis of other products. It has a long history as a fuel for heat and light, and more recently as a fuel for internal combustion engines.

== See also ==
- Ethanol-induced non-lamellar phases in phospholipids
- Methanol
- 1-Propanol
- 2-Propanol
- Rubbing alcohol
- tert-Butyl alcohol
- Butanol fuel
- Timeline of alcohol fuel
